= Endemism in the Hawaiian Islands =

Hawai'i is home to a large number of endemic species

Endemism in the Hawaiian Islands refers to the fact that the islands are home to a large number of endemic species unique to the archipelago.

Located nearly 2,400 miles (about 3,900 km) from the nearest continental shore, the Hawaiian Islands are the most isolated group of islands on the planet. The plant and animal life of the Hawaiian archipelago is the result of early, very infrequent colonizations of arriving species and the slow evolution of those species—in isolation from the rest of the world's flora and fauna—over a period of at least 5 million years. As a consequence, Hawai'i is home to a large number of endemic species. The radiation of species described by Charles Darwin in the Galapagos Islands which was critical to the formulation of his theory of evolution is far exceeded in the more isolated Hawaiian Islands.

The relatively short time that the existing main islands of the archipelago have been above the surface of the ocean (less than 10 million years) is only a fraction of time span over which biological colonization and evolution have occurred in the archipelago. High, volcanic islands have existed in the Pacific far longer, extending in a chain to the northwest; these once mountainous islands are now reduced to submerged banks and coral atolls. Midway Atoll, for example, formed as a volcanic island some 28 million years ago. Kure Atoll, a little further to the northwest, is near the Darwin point—defined as waters of a temperature that allows coral reef development to just keep up with isostatic sinking. And extending back in time before Kure, an even older chain of islands spreads northward nearly to the Aleutian Islands; these former islands, all north of the Darwin point, are now completely submerged as the Emperor Seamounts.

The islands are well known for the environmental diversity that occurs on high mountains within a trade winds field. On a single island, the climate can differ around the coast from dry tropical (< 20 in or 500 mm annual rainfall) to wet tropical; and up the slopes from tropical rainforest (> 200 in or 5,000 mm per year) through a temperate climate into alpine conditions of cold and dry climate. The rainy climate impacts soil development, which largely determines ground permeability, which affects the distribution of streams, wetlands, and wet places.

The distance and remoteness of the Hawaiian archipelago is a biological filter. Seeds or spores attached to a lost migrating bird's feather or an insect falling out of the high winds found a place to survive in the islands and whatever else was needed to reproduce. The narrowing of the gene pool meant that at the very beginning, the population of a colonizing species was a bit different from that of the remote contributing population. This list does not include species extinct in prehistoric times.

== Island formation ==
Throughout time, the Hawaiian Islands formed linearly from northwest to the southeast. A study was conducted to determine the approximate ages of the Hawaiian Islands using K–Ar dating of the oldest found igneous rocks from each island. Kauai was determined to be about 5.1 million years old, Oahu about 3.7 million years old and the youngest island of Hawaii about 0.43 million years old. By determining the maximum age of the islands, inferences could be made about the maximum possible age of organisms inhabiting the island. The newly formed islands were able to accommodate growing populations, while the new environments were causing high rates of new adaptations.

== Human arrival ==
Human contact, first by Polynesians and later by Europeans, has had a significant impact. Both the Polynesians and Europeans cleared native forests and introduced non-indigenous species for agriculture (or by accident), driving many endemic species to extinction. Fossil finds in caves, lava tubes, and sand dunes have revealed an avifauna that once had a native eagle, two raven-size crows, several bird-eating owls, and giant ducks known as moa-nalos. Around 861 species of plants have been introduced to the islands by humans since its discovery by Polynesian settlers, including crops such as taro and breadfruit.

Today, many of the remaining endemic species of plants and animals in the Hawaiian Islands are considered endangered, and some critically so. Plant species are particularly at risk: out of a total of 2,690 plant species, 946 are non-indigenous with 800 of the native species listed as endangered.

== Terrestrial vertebrates ==
=== Mammals ===
- Hawaiian hoary bat (a.k.a. ʻŌpeʻapeʻa) (Lasiurus semotus) - endangered
- Hawaiian monk seal (a.k.a. ʻIlio-holo-i-ka-uaua) (Neomonachus schauinslandi) - endangered
- Synemporion keana (a species of vesper bat) - extinct

=== Birds ===
- Hawaiian duck (a.k.a. Koloa) (Anas wyvilliana) - endangered
- Laysan duck (Anas laysanensis) - critically endangered
- Nene (a.k.a. Hawaiian goose) (Branta sandvicensis) - near threatened
- Hawaiian petrel (Pterodroma sandwichensis) - endangered
- Newell's shearwater (a.k.a. Hawaiian shearwater or 'a'o) (Puffinus newelli) - critically endangered
- Hawaiian hawk (a.k.a. 'Io) (Buteo solitarius) - near threatened
- Laysan rail (Porzana palmeri) - extinct
- Hawaiian rail (Porzana sandwichensis) - extinct
- Hawaiian gallinule (Gallinula chloropus sanvicensis)
- Hawaiian coot (Fulica alai) - vulnerable
- Hawaiian stilt (Himantopus himantopus knudseni)
- Hawaiian black noddy (Anous minutus melanogenys)
- Pueo (Asio flammeus sandwichensis) - endangered
- Kauaʻi oʻo (Moho braccatus) - extinct
- Oʻahu ʻōʻō (Moho apicalis) - extinct
- Molokaʻi ʻōʻō (Moho bishopi) - extinct
- Hawaiʻi ʻōʻō (Moho nobilis) - extinct
- Kioea (Chaetoptila angustipluma) - extinct
- Kāmaʻo (Myadestes myadestinus) - extinct
- Puaiohi (Myadestes palmeri) - critically endangered
- Olomaʻo (Myadestes lanaiensis) - critically endangered/extinct
  - ʻĀmaui (Myadestes lanaiensis woahensis) - extinct
- ʻŌmaʻo (Myadestes obscurus) - vulnerable
- Millerbird (Acrocephalus familiaris) - critically endangered
- Hawaiʻi ʻelepaio (Chasiempis sandwichensis) - vulnerable
- Oʻahu ʻelepaio (Chasiempis ibidis) - endangered
- Kauaʻi ʻelepaio (Chasiempis sclateri) - vulnerable
- Hawaiian crow (Corvus hawaiiensis) - extinct in the wild
- Laysan finch (Telespiza cantans) - vulnerable
- Nīhoa finch (Telespiza ultima) - critically endangered
- Lesser koa finch (Rhodacanthus flaviceps) - extinct
- Greater koa finch (Rhodacanthus palmeri) - extinct
- Maui parrotbill (Pseudonestor xanthophrys) - critically endangered
- ʻŌʻū (Psittirostra psittacea) - critically endangered/extinct
- Palila (Loxioides bailleui) - critically endangered
- Lanaʻi hookbill (Dysmorodrepanis munroi) - extinct
- Kona grosbeak (Chlroidops kona) - extinct
- Common ʻamakihi (Hemignathus virens) - least concern
- Oʻahu ʻamakihi (Hemignathus flavus) - vulnerable
- Kauaʻi ʻamakihi (Hemignathus kauaiensis) - vulnerable
- Greater ʻamakihi (Hemignathus sagittirostris) - extinct
- Maui nukupuʻu (Hemignathus affinis) - critically endangered/extinct
- Kauaʻi nukupuʻu (Hemignathus hanapepe) - critically endangered/extinct
- Oʻahu nukupuʻu (Hemignathus lucidus) - extinct
- ʻAkiapolaʻau (Hemignathus munroi) - endangered
- ʻAnianiau (Magumma parva) - vulnerable
- Hawaiʻi ʻakialoa (Akialoa obscura) - extinct
- Kauaʻi ʻakialoa (Akialoa stejnegeri) - extinct
- Maui Nui ʻakialoa (Akialoa lanaiensis)- extinct
- Oahu ʻakialoa (Akialoa ellisiana) - extinct
- ʻAkekeʻe (Loxops caeruleirostris) - critically endangered
- Hawaiʻi ʻākepa (Loxops coccineus) - endangered
- Maui ʻākepa (Loxops ochraceus) - extinct
- Oʻahu ʻākepa (Loxops wolstenholmei) - extinct
- ʻAkikiki (Oreomystis bairdi) - critically endangered
- Hawaiʻi creeper (Oreomystis mana) - endangered
- Molokai creeper (Paroreomyza flammea) - extinct
- Oʻahu ʻalauahio (Paroreomyza maculata) - critically endangered/extinct
- Maui ʻalauahio (Paroreomyza montana) - endangered
- Lanaʻi ʻalauahio (Paroreomyza montana montana) - extinct
- ʻAkohekohe (a.k.a. Crested honeycreeper) (Palmeria dolei) - critically endangered
- Poʻouli (Melamprosops phaeosoma) - critically endangered/extinct
- ʻUla-ʻai-hāwane (Ciridops anna) - extinct
- ʻIʻiwi (a.k.a. Scarlet honeycreeper) (Drepanis coccinea) - vulnerable
- Hawaiʻi mamo (Drepanis pacifica) - extinct
- Black mamo (Drepanis funerea) - extinct
- Laysan honeycreeper (Himantione fraithii) - extinct
- ʻApapane (Himantione sanguinea) - least concern

=== Freshwater fishes ===
None of Hawaii's native fish are entirely restricted to freshwater (all are either anadromous, or also found in brackish and marine water in their adult stage).

- ʻOʻopu nākea (Awaous stamineus)
- Āholehole (Kuhlia xenura)
- ʻOʻopu ʻalamoʻo (Lentipes concolor) - data deficient
- ʻOʻopu nanih (Stenogobius hawaiiensis)
- ‘O‘opu ‘akupa (Eleotris sandwicensis) - data deficient
- ʻOʻopu nōpili (Sicyopterus stimpsoni) - near threatened

== Terrestrial invertebrates ==
=== Insects ===
- Hyposmocoma (a genus of moths, such as the snail-eating caterpillar)
- Agrotis (a genus of moths)
- Drosophila (a genus of flies)
- Campsicnemus mirabilis (an extinct species of fly)
- Campsicnemus brevipes (a species of fly)
- Paralopostega (a genus of moths)
- Mestolobes (a genus of moths)
- Hypena (a genus of moths)
- Orthomecyna (a genus of moths)
- Helicoverpa (a genus of moths)
- Scotorythra (a genus of moths)
- Genophantis (a genus of moths)
- Tritocleis (a genus of moths)
- Eurynogaster (a genus of flies)
- Kamehameha butterfly (a.k.a. Pulelehua) (Vanessa tameamea)
- Green Hawaiian blue (Udara blackburni)
- Longhead yellow-faced bee (a.k.a. the Hawaiian yellow-faced bee) (Hylaeus longiceps)
- Thaumatogryllus (a genus of crickets)
- Wēkiu bug (Nysius wekiuicola)
- Drosophila sharpi (a rare species of fly)
- Koʻolau spurwing long-legged fly (an extinct species of fly)
- Lanai pomace fly (an extinct species of fly)
- Phyllococcus oahuensis (a species of mealybug)
- Megalagrion (a genus of damselfly)
- Clavicoccus (a genus of mealybug)
- Dryophthorus distinguendus (a species of weevil)
- Laysan weevil (an extinct species of weevil)
- Rhyncogonus bryani (an extinct species of weevil)
- Manduca blackburni (an endangered species of hawkmoth)
- Thyrocopa (a genus of moths)
- Caconemobius nori (a species of cricket)
- Caconemobius howarthi (a species of cricket)
- Caconemobius schauinslandi (a species of cricket)
- Caconemobius varius (a species of cricket)

=== Crustaceans ===
- Atyoida bisulcata (a freshwater shrimp)
- Halocaridina (a genus of marine and brackish water shrimp)
- Hawaiian river shrimp (Macrobrachium grandimanus)

=== Spiders ===
- Ariamnes makue (a species of spider)
- Happy face spider (Theridion grallator)
- Kauaʻi cave wolf spider (Adelocosa anops) - endangered
- Orsonwelles, a genus of 13 species, each endemic to a single island
- Nihoa (a genus of spiders)
- Lycosa hawaiiensis (a species of spider)

=== Gastropods ===
Gastropods are snails.

- Oʻahu tree snails (Achatinella) - threatened, several already extinct
- Auriculella (a genus of land snails) - threatened, several already extinct
- Amastra (a genus of land snails) - many species extinct
- Carelia (a genus of land snails) - entire genus extinct
- Erinna (a genus of freshwater snails) - one vulnerable species, the other possibly extinct
- Gulickia alexandri (a land snail) - critically endangered
- Newcombia (a genus of land snails) - threatened, one already extinct
- Neritina granosa (a freshwater snail) - vulnerable
- Perdicella (a genus of land snails) - threatened, several already extinct
- Partulina (a genus of land snails) - threatened, several already extinct

== Marine animals ==
=== Cnidarians ===
- Finger coral (Porites compressa)
- Thick finger coral (Porites duerdeni)
- Brigham's coral (Porites brighami)
- Molokaʻi cauliflower coral (Pocillopora molokensis)
- Irregular rice coral (Montipora dilatata)
- Blue rice coral (Montipora flabellata)
- Sandpaper or Ringed rice coral (Montipora patula)
- Verril's lump coral (Psammocora verrilli)
- Serpentine cup coral (Eguchipsammia serpentina)
- Grand black coral (Antipathes grandis)
- Bicolor gorgonian (Melithaea bicolor)
- Small knob leather coral (Sclerophytum molokaiense)

== Plants ==
The Hawaiian Islands are home to dozens of endemic species and subspecies of plants, including endemic genera × Argyrautia, Argyroxiphium, Brighamia, Clermontia, Cyanea, Delissea, Dissochondrus, Dubautia, Haplostachys, Helodeaster, Hesperomannia, Hibiscadelphus, Hillebrandia, Isodendrion, Kokia, × Lindsaeosoria, Lipochaeta, Neraudia, Nothocestrum, Nototrichium, Pteralyxia, Remya, Rockia, Schiedea, Stenogyne, Touchardia, Trematolobelia, and Wilkesia.

The following list of endemic vascular plants is from Plants of the World Online, current and complete as of March 2025. Plants are listed alphabetically by order and family.

=== Lycopods ===
==== Lycopodiaceae ====
- Huperzia × carlquistii Beitel & W.H.Wagner (H. somae × H. subintegra)
- Huperzia erosa Beitel & W.H.Wagner
- Huperzia erubescens (Brack.) Holub
- Huperzia × gillettii Beitel & W.H.Wagner (H. serrata × H. subintegra)
- Huperzia × koolauensis (W.H.Wagner) Kartesz (H. nutans × H. phyllantha)
- Huperzia mannii (Hillebr.) Holub
- Huperzia × medeirosii Beitel & W.H.Wagner (H. haleakalae × H. subintegra)
- Huperzia stemmermanniae (A.C.Medeiros & W.H.Wagner) Kartesz
- Huperzia subintegra (Hillebr.) Beitel & W.H.Wagner
- Huperzia × sulcinervia (Spring) Trevis. (H. erubescens × H. serrata)
- Lycopodium venustulum var. verticale W.H.Wagner – Hawaii and Maui

==== Selaginellaceae ====
- Selaginella deflexa Brack.
- Selaginella menziesii (Hook. & Grev.) Spring
- Selaginella sandvicensis Baker

=== Ferns ===
==== Aspleniaceae ====
- Asplenium dielerectum Viane
- Asplenium dielfalcatum Viane – Oahu
- † Asplenium dielmannii Viane – Kauai
- Asplenium dielpallidum N.Snow – Kauai
- Asplenium × flagrum W.H.Wagner & D.D.Palmer – Kauai
- Asplenium haleakalense W.H.Wagner – Maui
- Asplenium hobdyi W.H.Wagner
- Asplenium × joellaui N.Snow
- Asplenium kaulfussii Schltdl.
- Asplenium × kokeense W.H.Wagner – Kauai
- † Asplenium leucostegioides Baker – E. Maui. Last recorded in the 1880s
- Asplenium neobrackenridgei W.H.Wagner
- Asplenium peruvianum var. insulare (C.V.Morton) D.D.Palmer – Maui, Hawaii
- Asplenium schizophyllum C.Chr.
- Asplenium × sphenocookii W.H.Wagner – Kauai
- Asplenium sphenotomum Hillebr.
- Asplenium trichomanes subsp. densum (Brack.) W.H.Wagner – Maui, Hawaii
- † Asplenium unisorum (W.H.Wagner) Viane – Oahu
- Asplenium × waikamoi W.H.Wagner & D.D.Palmer (A. acuminatum × A. aethiopicum) – Maui
- Athyrium haleakalae K.R.Wood & W.L.Wagner
- Athyrium microphyllum (Sm.) Alston
- ʻamaʻumaʻu fern (Blechnum cyatheoides (Kaulf.) Christenh.)
- Blechnum lyonii (O.Deg.) Christenh.
- Blechnum norfolkense Christenh.
- Blechnum pallidum (Hook. & Arn.) Brack.
- Blechnum souleytianum Gaudich.
- Blechnum squarrosum Gaudich.
- Blechnum unisorum (Baker) Christenh. – Kauai
- Blechnum wagnerianum (D.D.Palmer & T.Flynn) Christenh. – Kauai
- Cystopteris douglasii Hook.
- Deparia cataracticola M.Kato
- Deparia fenzliana (Luerss.) M.Kato
- Deparia kaalaana (Copel.) M.Kato
- Deparia marginalis (Hillebr.) M.Kato
- Deparia prolifera (Kaulf.) Hook. & Grev.
- Molokai twinsorus fern (Diplazium molokaiense W.J.Rob.)
- Diplazium sandwichense C.Presl
- Diplazium sandwichianum (Hook.) Diels
- Phegopteris keraudreniana (Gaudich.) Mann
- Thelypteris boydiae (D.C.Eaton) K.Iwats. – Oahu, Maui, Hawaii
- Thelypteris cyatheoides (Kaulf.) Fosberg
- Thelypteris exindusiata W.H.Wagner
- Thelypteris globulifera (Brack.) C.F.Reed
- Thelypteris hudsoniana (Brack.) C.F.Reed
- Thelypteris palmeri W.H.Wagner
- Thelypteris pendens (D.D.Palmer) Christenh.
- Thelypteris stegnogrammoides (Baker) Fosberg
- Thelypteris wailele Flynn – Kauai

==== Cyatheae ====
- Cibotium chamissoi Kaulf. – Oahu
- Cibotium glaucum (Sm.) Hook. & Arn.
- Cibotium × heleniae D.D.Palmer
- hāpuʻu ʻiʻi or Hawaiian tree fern (Cibotium menziesii Hook.)
- Cibotium nealiae Degen. – Kauai

==== Dennstaedtiaceae ====
- Hypolepis hawaiiensis Brownsey
- Microlepia × adulterina W.H.Wagner (M. setosa × M. speluncae) – Oahu
- Microlepia setosa var. mauiensis (W.H.Wagner) Miles K.Thomas – Maui and Hawaii
- Pteridium decompositum (Gaudich.) Christenh.

==== Gleicheniaceae ====
- Dicranopteris linearis f. emarginata (T.Moore) W.H.Wagner
- Diplopterygium pinnatum (Kunze) Nakai
- Sticherus owhyhensis (Hook.) Ching

==== Hymenophyllaceae ====
- Hymenophyllum lanceolatum Hook. & Arn.
- Hymenophyllum obtusum Hook. & Arn.
- Hymenophyllum recurvum Gaudich.
- Trichomanes baldwinii (D.C.Eaton) Copel.
- Trichomanes cyrtotheca Hillebr.
- Trichomanes davallioides Gaudich.
- Trichomanes draytonianum Brack.
- Trichomanes tubiflora (F.S.Wagner) Christenh. – Kauai

==== Lindsaeaceae ====
- × Lindsaeosoria W.H.Wagner (Lindsaea × Odontosoria)
  - × Lindsaeosoria flynnii W.H.Wagner – Kauai

==== Marattiaceae ====
- Marattia douglasii (C.Presl) Baker

==== Ophioglossaceae ====
- † Botrychium subbifoliatum Brack.

==== Polypodiaceae ====
- Pendant kihi fern (Adenophorus periens L.E.Bishop)
- wahine noho mauna (Adenophorus tamariscinus (Kaulf.) Hook. & Grev.)
- Arachniodes insularis W.H.Wagner
- Ctenitis latifrons (Brack.) Copel.
- Pacific lacefern or pauoa (Ctenitis squamigera (Hook. & Arn.) Copel.)
- Dryopteris crinalis (Hook. & Arn.) C.Chr.
- Dryopteris fuscoatra (Hillebr.) W.J.Rob.
- Dryopteris glabra (Brack.) Kuntze
- Dryopteris hawaiiensis (Hillebr.) W.J.Rob.
- Dryopteris mauiensis C.Chr.
- Dryopteris rubiginosa (Brack.) Kuntze
- Dryopteris sandwicensis (Hook. & Arn.) C.Chr.
- Dryopteris subbipinnata W.H.Wagner & R.W.Hobdy – Maui, Hawaii
- Dryopteris tetrapinnata W.H.Wagner & Hobdy – Maui
- Dryopteris unidentata (Hook. & Arn.) C.Chr.
- Elaphoglossum aemulum (Kaulf.) Brack.
- Elaphoglossum alatum Gaudich. – Oahu
- Elaphoglossum crassicaule Copel. – Kauai
- Elaphoglossum crassifolium (Gaudich.) W.R.Anderson & Crosby
- Elaphoglossum fauriei Copel. – Oahu, Molokai
- Elaphoglossum parvisquameum Skottsb.
- Elaphoglossum pellucidum Gaudich.
- Elaphoglossum wawrae (Luerss.) C.Chr.
- Grammitis baldwinii (Baker) Copel. – Kauai
- Grammitis forbesiana W.H.Wagner
- Grammitis oahuensis Copel. – Kauai
- Grammitis saffordii (Maxon) C.V.Morton
- Grammitis tenella Kaulf.
- Microsorum spectrum (Kaulf.) Copel.
- Nephrolepis exaltata subsp. hawaiiensis W.H.Wagner
- Polypodium pellucidum Kaulf.
- Polystichum bonseyi W.H.Wagner & R.W.Hobdy – Maui, Hawaii
- Polystichum haleakalense Brack. – Maui, Hawaii
- Polystichum hillebrandii Carruth. – Maui, Hawaii
- Tectaria gaudichaudii (Mett.) Maxon

==== Psilotaceae ====
- Psilotum × intermedium W.H.Wagner (P. complanatum × P. nudum)

==== Pteridaceae ====
- Coniogramme pilosa Hieron.
- Hemionitis angelica (K.Wood & W.H.Wagner) Christenh.
- Hemionitis decipiens (Hook.) Christenh.
- Hemionitis decora (Brack.) Christenh.
- Hemionitis takeuchii (W.H.Wagner) Christenh. – Oahu and Lanai
- Pteris hillebrandii Copel.
- Pteris irregularis Kaulf.
- Pteris lydgatei (Baker) Christ – Oahu, Molokai, and Maui

=== Flowering plants ===
==== Alismatales ====
===== Hydrocharitaceae =====
- Halophila hawaiiana Doty & B.C.Stone

==== Apiales ====
===== Apiaceae =====
- Peucedanum sandwicense Hillebr.
- Sanicula kauaiensis H.St.John
- Sanicula mariversa Nagata & S.M.Gon
- Sanicula purpurea H.St.John & Hosaka
- Sanicula sandwicensis A.Gray
- Spermolepis hawaiiensis H.Wolff

===== Araliaceae =====
- Cheirodendron dominii Krajina - Kauai
- Cheirodendron fauriei Hochr. – Kauai
- Cheirodendron forbesii (Sherff) Lowry
- Lapalapa (Cheirodendron platyphyllum (Hook. & Arn.) Seem.)
- ʻŌlapa (Cheirodendron trigynum (Gaudich.) A.Heller)
  - Cheirodendron trigynum subsp. helleri (Sherff) Lowry – Kauai
  - Cheirodendron trigynum subsp. trigynum
- Polyscias bisattenuata (Sherff) Lowry & G.M.Plunkett – SE. Kauai
- Polyscias flynnii (Lowry & K.R.Wood) Lowry & G.M.Plunkett – Kauai
- Polyscias gymnocarpa (Hillebr.) Lowry & G.M.Plunkett – Oahu
- Polyscias hawaiensis (A.Gray) Lowry & G.M.Plunkett
- Polyscias kavaiensis (H.Mann) Lowry & G.M.Plunkett
- Polyscias lydgatei (Hillebr.) Lowry & G.M.Plunkett – Oahu
- Polyscias oahuensis (A.Gray) Lowry & G.M.Plunkett
- Polyscias sandwicensis (A.Gray) Lowry & G.M.Plunkett
- Polyscias waialealae (Rock) Lowry & G.M.Plunkett – Kauai
- Polyscias waimeae (Wawra) Lowry & G.M.Plunkett – Kauai

===== Pittosporaceae =====
- Pittosporum argentifolium Sherff
- Pittosporum confertiflorum A.Gray
- Pittosporum flocculosum (Hillebr.) Sherff
- Pittosporum gayanum Rock
- Pittosporum glabrum Hook. & Arn.
- Pittosporum halophilum Rock – northeastern Molokai
- Pittosporum hawaiiense Hillebr.
- Pittosporum hosmeri Rock
- Pittosporum kauaiense Hillebr.
- Pittosporum × monae Rock ex H.St.John (P. hosmeri × P. terminalioides)
- Pittosporum napaliense Sherff
- Pittosporum terminalioides Planch. ex A.Gray

==== Arecales ====
===== Arecaceae =====
- Pritchardia arecina Becc. – E. Maui
- Pritchardia bakeri Hodel – Oahu
- Pritchardia beccariana Rock – Hawaii: Mauna Loa
- Pritchardia flynnii Lorence & Gemmill – Kauai
- Pritchardia forbesiana Rock – E. Molokai, W. Maui
- Pritchardia glabrata Becc. & Rock – Lanai, W. Maui
- Pritchardia gordonii Hodel – Hawaii: Kohala Mts.
- Pritchardia hardyi Rock – EC. Kauai
- Pritchardia hillebrandii Becc. – N. Molokai
- Pritchardia kaalae Rock – W. Oahu
- Pritchardia kahukuensis Caum – Oahu: NW. Koolau Mts.
- Pritchardia lanigera Becc. – Hawaii
- Pritchardia lowreyana Rock ex Becc. – E. Molokai, Oahu
- Pritchardia maideniana Becc. – Hawaii
- Pritchardia martii (Gaudich.) H.Wendl. – Oahu
- Pritchardia minor Becc. – Kauai
- Pritchardia munroi Rock – NE. Molokai, W. Maui
- Pritchardia napaliensis H.St.John – Kauai
- Pritchardia perlmanii Gemmill – Kauai
- Pritchardia remota (Kuntze) Becc. – Nihoa, Niihau
- Pritchardia schattaueri Hodel – Hawaii: S. Kona
- Pritchardia viscosa Rock – Kauai
- Pritchardia waialealeana Read – EC. Kauai
- Pritchardia woodii Hodel – E. Maui

==== Asparagales ====
===== Asparagaceae =====
- Golden hala pepe (Dracaena aurea H.Mann) – Kauai
- Lanai hala pepe (Dracaena fernaldii (H.St.John) Jankalski) – Lanai
- Waianae Range hala pepe (Dracaena forbesii (O.Deg.) Jankalski) – Oahu
- Royal hala pepe (Dracaena halapepe (H.St.John) Jankalski) – Oahu
- Dracaena halemanuensis Jankalski
- Hawai'i hala pepe (Dracaena konaensis (H.St.John) Jankalski) – Hawaii
- Maui hala pepe (Dracaena rockii (H.St.John) Jankalski) – Molokai, Maui

===== Asteliaceae =====
- Astelia argyrocoma A.Heller ex Skottsb. – Kauai
- Puaʻakuhinia (Astelia menziesiana Sm.)
- Pa'iniu (Astelia waialealae Wawra) – Kauai

===== Iridiaceae =====
- Sisyrinchium acre H.Mann – eastern Maui and Hawaii

===== Orchidaceae =====
- Hawai'i jewel orchid (Anoectochilus sandvicensis Lindl.)
- Hawai'i widelip orchid (Liparis hawaiensis H.Mann)
- Hawai'i bog orchid (Peristylus holochila (Hillebr.) N.Hallé)

==== Asterales ====
===== Asteraceae =====
- × Argyrautia Sherff (Argyroxiphium × Dubautia)
  - × Argyrautia degeneri Sherff (Argyroxiphium grayanum × Dubautia laxa)
- Argyroxiphium DC.
  - ʻEke silversword (Argyroxiphium caligini C.N.Forbes) – western Maui
  - Greensword (Argyroxiphium grayanum (Hillebr.) O.Deg.)
  - Argyroxiphium × kai (C.N.Forbes) D.D.Keck (A. caligini × A. grayanum)
  - Mauna Loa silversword (Argyroxiphium kauense (Rock & Neal) O.Deg. & I.Deg.)
  - Hawaii silversword (Argyroxiphium sandwicense DC.) – Hawaii
  - † Argyroxiphium virescens Hillebr. – E. Maui: Ukelele, Pu'unianiau, Ko'olau Gap, Kuiki. Last recorded in 1945
- Artemisia australis Less.
- Artemisia kauaiensis (Skottsb.) Skottsb. – Kauai
- Artemisia mauiensis Skottsb.
- Bidens amplectens Sherff – Oahu
- Bidens asymmetrica Sherff – Oahu
- Bidens campylotheca Sch.Bip.
- Bidens cervicata Sherff
- Bidens conjuncta Sherff – W. Maui
- Bidens cosmoides Sherff – Kauai
- Bidens forbesii Sherff – Kauai
- Bidens hawaiensis A.Gray – Hawaii
- Bidens hillebrandiana (Drake) O.Deg. ex Sherff – Hawaii
- Bidens macrocarpa Sherff – Oahu
- Bidens mauiensis Sherff – Lanai, Maui, Kahoolawe
- Bidens menziesii Sherff – Molokai, W. Maui
- Bidens micrantha Gaudich. – Maui
- Bidens molokaiensis Sherff
- Bidens populifolia Sherff – Oahu
- Bidens sandvicensis Less. – Kauai, Oahu
- Bidens torta Sherff – Oahu
- Bidens valida Sherff – Kauai
- Bidens wailele K.R.Wood & Knope – Kauai
- Bidens wiebkei Sherff – NE. Molokai
- Dubautia Gaudich.
  - Tree dubautia (Dubautia arborea (A.Gray) D.D.Keck)
  - Dubautia carrii B.G.Baldwin & Friar – Molokai
  - Dubautia ciliolata (DC.) D.D.Keck – Hawaii
  - Dubautia × fallax Sherff (D. plantaginea × D. scabra)
  - Dubautia hanaulaensis B.G.Baldwin
  - Keaau Valley dubautia (Dubautia herbstobatae G.D.Carr)
  - Bog dubautia (Dubautia imbricata H.St.John & G.D.Carr) – Kauai
  - Dubautia kalalauensis B.G.Baldwin & G.D.Carr – Kauai
  - Kalalau rim dubautia (Dubautia kenwoodii G.D.Carr)
  - Dubautia knudsenii Hillebr. – Kauai
  - Dubautia laevigata A.Gray – Kauai
  - Koholapehu (Dubautia latifolia (A.Gray) D.D.Keck) – Kauai
  - Dubautia laxa Hook. & Arn. – Oahu, Molokai, Maui
  - Dubautia linearis (Gaudich.) D.D.Keck
  - Dubautia × media Sherff (D. laevigata × D. laxa)
  - Dubautia menziesii (A.Gray) D.D.Keck – E. Maui
  - Small-headed dubautia (Dubautia microcephala Skottsb.) – Kauai
  - Dubautia paleata A.Gray – Kauai
  - Wahiawa bog dubautia (Dubautia pauciflorula H.St.John & G.D.Carr) – Kauai
  - Plantainleaf dubautia (Dubautia plantaginea Gaudich.)
  - Dubautia platyphylla (A.Gray) D.D.Keck – Maui
  - Dubautia raillardioides Hillebr. – Kauai
  - Net-veined dubautia (Dubautia reticulata (Sherff) D.D.Keck)
  - Dubautia scabra (DC.) D.D.Keck
  - Dubautia sherffiana Fosberg – Oahu
  - Wahiawa dubautia (Dubautia syndetica G.D.Carr & Lorence) – Kauai
  - Dubautia × thyrsiflora (Sherff) D.D.Keck (D. dolosa × D. scabra)
  - Waiʻaleʻale dubautia (Dubautia waialealae Rock) – Kauai
  - Dubautia waianapanapaensis G.D.Carr – E. Maui
- Helodeaster G.L.Nesom
  - Helodeaster erici (C.N.Forbes) G.L.Nesom – Kauai
  - Helodeaster helenae (C.N.Forbes & Lydgate) G.L.Nesom – Kauai
  - Helodeaster maviensis S. Molokai, Maui
- Hesperomannia A.Gray
  - Hesperomannia arborescens A.Gray (synonym Hesperomannia arbuscula Hillebr.) – Lanai or Maui hesperomannia
  - Hesperomannia lydgatei C.N.Forbes – Kauai hesperomannia
  - Hesperomannia oahuensis (Hillebr.) O.Deg.
  - Hesperomannia swezeyi O.Deg.
- Lipochaeta DC.
  - † Lipochaeta bryanii Sherff – Kahoolawe
  - Lipochaeta connata (Gaudich.) DC. – Kauai, W. Maui
  - † Lipochaeta degeneri Sherff – SW. Molokai. Last recorded in 1928.
  - Lipochaeta fauriei H.Lév. – Kauai
  - Lipochaeta heterophylla A.Gray – Molokai, Lanai, Maui
  - Lipochaeta integrifolia (Nutt.) A.Gray
  - Lipochaeta kamolensis O.Deg. & Sherff – SE. Maui
  - Lipochaeta lavarum (Gaudich.) DC.
  - Lipochaeta lobata (Gaudich.) DC. – Niihau, Oahu, W. Maui
  - Lipochaeta micrantha (Nutt.) A.Gray – Kauai
  - † Lipochaeta perdita Sherff – Niihau: Kawaihoa Pt. Last recorded in 1949.
  - † Lipochaeta populifolia (Sherff) R.C.Gardner – Lanai: Maunalei Valley
  - Lipochaeta × procumbens O.Deg. & Sherff (L. integrifolia × L. lobata)
  - Lipochaeta remyi A.Gray – Oahu
  - Lipochaeta rockii Sherff
  - Lipochaeta subcordata A.Gray – Hawaii
  - Lipochaeta succulenta (Hook. & Arn.) DC.
  - Lipochaeta tenuifolia A.Gray – Oahu
  - Lipochaeta tenuis O.Deg. & Sherff – Oahu
  - Lipochaeta venosa Sherff – Hawaii
  - Lipochaeta waimeaensis H.St.John – Kauai
- Pseudognaphalium sandwicensium (Gaudich.) Anderb.
- Remya Hillebr. ex Benth. & Hook.f.
  - Remya kauaiensis Hillebr. – Kauai
  - Remya mauiensis Hillebr. – W. Maui
  - Remya montgomeryi W.L.Wagner & D.R.Herbst – Kauai
- Tetramolopium arenarium Hillebr.
- Tetramolopium capillare (Gaudich.) St.John – W. Maui: Lahaina Luna to Wailuku
- Tetramolopium consanguineum Hillebr. – Kauai
- Tetramolopium conyzoides (A.Gray) Hillebr. – SW. Molokai, Lanai, Maui: Waiehu ?; Kula, Hawaii
- Tetramolopium filiforme Sherff – Oahu
- Tetramolopium humile Hillebr. – Hawaii
- Tetramolopium lepidotum (Less.) Sherff
- Tetramolopium remyi (A.Gray) Hillebr.
- Tetramolopium rockii Sherff – NW. Molokai
- Tetramolopium tenerrimum (Less.) Nees – Oahu: Ko'olau Mts.
- Wilkesia A.Gray
  - Hawaiian iliau (Wilkesia gymnoxiphium A.Gray) – Kauai
  - Dwarf iliau (Wilkesia hobdyi H.St.John) – Kauai

===== Campanulaceae =====
- Brighamia A.Gray
  - Alula (Brighamia insignis) - Niihau and Kauai; critically endangered, possibly extinct in the wild
  - Brighamia rockii H.St.John - critically endangered
- Clermontia Gaudich.
  - Clermontia arborescens (H.Mann) Hillebr.
  - Clermontia calophylla E.Wimm - northwestern Hawaii; endangered
  - Clermontia clermontioides (Gaudich.) A.Heller – Hawaii
  - Clermontia drepanomorpha Rock - Hawaii, endangered
  - Clermontia fauriei H.Lév. – Kauai and Oahu
  - Clermontia grandiflora Gaudich.
  - Clermontia hanaulaensis H.Oppenh. - western Maui; endangered
  - Clermontia hawaiiensis (Hillebr.) Rock – Hawaii
  - Clermontia kakeana Meyen – Maui, Molokai, and Oahu
  - Clermontia kohalae Rock – northern Hawaii
  - Clermontia × leptoclada Rock (C. drepanomorpha × C. hohalae) – Hawaii
  - Clermontia lindseyana Rock - Hawaii; endangered
  - Clermontia micrantha (Hillebr.) Rock – western Maui and Lanai
  - Clermontia montis-loa Rock – Hawaii
  - Clermontia multiflora Hillebr. – Oahu and western Maui
  - Clermontia oblongifolia Gaudich. - endangered
  - Clermontia pallida Hillebr. – eastern Molokai
  - Clermontia × paradisia E.Wimm. – Hawaii
  - Clermontia parviflora Gaudich. ex A.Gray – northern and eastern Hawaii
  - Clermontia peleana Rock - critically endangered
  - Clermontia persicifolia Gaudich. – Oahu
  - Clermontia pyrularia Hillebr. - north-central Hawaii; critically endangered
  - Clermontia samuelii C.N.Forbes - eastern Maui; endangered
  - Clermontia tuberculata C.N.Forbes - eastern Maui; endangered
  - Clermontia waimeae Rock - northwestern Hawaii; endangered
- Cyanea Gaudich.
  - Cyanea aculeatiflora Rock – eastern Maui
  - Cyanea acuminata (Gaudich.) Hillebr. – Oahu
  - Cyanea angustifolia (Cham.) Hillebr. – Oahu, Molokai, Lanai, and western Maui
  - Cyanea arborea Hillebr. – eastern Maui: Leeward Slope and Haleakala
  - Cyanea asarifolia H.St.John – northeastern Kauai
  - Cyanea asplenifolia (H.Mann) Hillebr. – northwestern Maui
  - Cyanea calycina (Cham.) Lammers – Oahu
  - Cyanea comata Hillebr. – eastern Maui: Leeward Slope and Haleakala
  - Cyanea copelandii Rock
  - Cyanea coriacea (A.Gray) Hillebr. – Kauai
  - Cyanea crispa (Gaudich.) Lammers, Givnish & Sytsma – Oahu
  - Cyanea cylindrocalyx (Rock) Lammers – Hawaii: Waipi'o Valley
  - Cyanea dolichopoda Lammers & Lorence – Kauai: Blue Hole
  - Cyanea dunbariae Rock – Molokai: Waihanau
  - Cyanea duvalliorum Lammers & H.Oppenh. – eastern Maui
  - Cyanea eleeleensis (H.St.John) Lammers – Kauai: Wainiha Valley
  - Cyanea elliptica (Rock) Lammers – Lanai and Maui
  - Cyanea fissa (H.Mann) Hillebr. – Kauai
  - Cyanea floribunda E.Wimm – Hawaii
  - Cyanea gibsonii Hillebr. – Lanai
  - † Cyanea giffardii Rock – Hawaii: Glenwood; last recorded in 1917
  - Cyanea glabra (E.Wimm.) H.St.John
  - Cyanea grimesiana Gaudich. – Oahu and Molokai
  - Cyanea habenata (H.St.John) Lammers - northern Kauai
  - Cyanea hamatiflora Rock
  - Cyanea hardyi Rock – southern Kauai
  - Cyanea heluensis H.Oppenh. – western Maui
  - Cyanea hirtella (H.Mann) Hillebr. – western Kauai
  - Cyanea horrida (Rock) O.Deg. & Hosaka – eastern Maui
  - Cyanea humboldtiana (Gaudich.) Lammers – Oahu
  - Cyanea kahiliensis (H.St.John) Lammers – Kauai
  - Cyanea kauaulaensis H.Oppenh. & Lorence – western Maui
  - † Cyanea kolekoleensis (H.St.John) Lammers – southern Kauai: Wahiawa Mts; last recorded in 1996
  - Cyanea konahuanuiensis Sporck-Koehler, M.Waite & A.M.Williams - Oahu: Koʻolau Range; critically endangered
  - Cyanea koolauensis Lammers, Givnish & Sytsma – Oahu
  - Cyanea kuhihewa Lammers – Kauai: Limahuli Valley
  - Cyanea kunthiana (Gaudich.) Hillebr. – Maui
  - Cyanea lanceolata (Gaudich.) Lammers, Givnish & Sytsma – Oahu
  - Cyanea leptostegia A.Gray – western Kauai
  - Cyanea linearifolia Rock – Kauai: Hi'i Mts.
  - Cyanea lobata H.Mann
  - Cyanea longiflora (Wawra) Lammers, Givnish & Sytsma – Oahu
  - † Cyanea longissima (Rock) H.St.John – eastern Maui: Windward slope of Haleakala
  - Cyanea macrostegia Hillebr. – Maui
  - Cyanea magnicalyx Lammers – western Maui
  - Cyanea mannii (Brigham ex H.Mann) Hillebr. – central Molokai
  - Cyanea maritae Lammers & H.Oppenh. - eastern Maui
  - Cyanea marksii Rock – Hawaii
  - Cyanea mauiensis (Rock) Lammers – Maui
  - Cyanea mceldowneyi Rock – eastern Maui
  - Cyanea membranacea Rock – Oahu
  - Cyanea minutiflora Lammers – Kauai
  - Cyanea munroi (Hosaka) Lammers – Lanai and Molokai
  - Cyanea obtusa (A.Gray) Hillebr. – Maui
  - † Cyanea parvifolia (C.N.Forbes) Lammers, Givnish & Sytsma – Kauai: Wai'oli Valley
  - Cyanea pilosa A.Gray – Hawaii
  - Cyanea pinnatifida (Cham.) E.Wimm. – Oahu
  - Cyanea platyphylla A.Gray) Hillebr. - Hawaii; critically endangered
  - Cyanea pohaku Lammers – eastern Maui
  - Cyanea procera Hillebr. – eastern Molokai
  - Cyanea profuga C.N.Forbes – eastern Molokai: Mapulehu and Pelekunu
  - Cyanea pseudofauriei Lammers – Kauai
  - Cyanea purpurellifolia (Rock) Lammers, Givnish & Sytsma – Oahu: Koʻolau Range
  - † Cyanea pycnocarpa (Hillebr.) E.Wimm. – Hawaii: Kohala Mts.
  - † Cyanea quercifolia (Hillebr.) E.Wimm. – eastern Maui: Leeward slope of Haleakala
  - † Cyanea recta (Wawra) Hillebr. – northeastern Kauai
  - Cyanea remyi Rock – Kauai
  - Cyanea rivularis Rock – Kauai
  - Cyanea salicina H.Lév. – Kauai
  - Cyanea scabra Hillebr. – western Maui
  - Cyanea sessilifolia (O.Deg.) Lammers – Oahu
  - Cyanea shipmanii Rock – Hawaii
  - Cyanea solanacea Hillebr. – Molokai
  - Cyanea solenocalyx Hillebr. – eastern Molokai
  - Cyanea spathulata (Hillebr.) A.Heller – western Kauai
  - Cyanea st-johnii (Hosaka) Lammers, Givnish & Sytsma – Oahu
  - Cyanea stictophylla Rock – Hawaii
  - Cyanea superba (Cham.) A.Gray - Oahu; extinct in the wild
  - Cyanea tritomantha A.Gray – Hawaii
  - † Cyanea truncata (Rock) Rock - Oahu; Last known plants died in the 1980s.
  - Cyanea undulata C.N.Forbes – south-central Kauai: Wahiawa Bog
- Delissea Gaudich.
  - Delissea argutidentata (E.Wimm.) H.St.John – northwestern Hawaii
  - † Delissea fallax Hillebr. – northern Hawaii: Hamakua and Hilo; last recorded in 1872
  - Delissea fauriei H.Lév. – eastern Molokai; last recorded in 1910
  - Delissea kauaiensis (Lammers) Lammers – Kauai
  - † Delissea laciniata Hillebr. – southeastern Oahu: Koʻolau Range and Wailupe; last recorded in 1872
  - † Delissea lanaiensis (Rock) Lammers – Lanai; last recorded in 1915
  - † Delissea lauliiana Lammers – southeastern Oahu: Koʻolau Range and Wailupe; last recorded in 1872
  - † Delissea niihauensis H.St.John – northeastern Niihau; last recorded in 1873
  - † Delissea parviflora Hillebr. – northern Hawaii: Kohala Mts. and Mauna Kea; last recorded in 1872
  - Delissea rhytidosperma H.Mann – Kauai
  - † Delissea sinuata Hillebr. – western Oahu; last recorded in 1937
  - † Delissea subcordata Gaudich. Oahu
  - † Delissea takeuchii Lammers – western Oahu: Waiʻanae Range; last recorded in 1987
  - † Delissea undulata Gaudich. – southwestern Maui; last recorded in 1870
  - Delissea waianaeensis Lammers – western Oahu: Waiʻanae Range
- Lobelia dunbariae Rock - Molokai; critically endangered
- Lobelia gaudichaudii A.DC. - Oahu: southern Koʻolau Range; critically endangered
- Lobelia gloria-montis Rock - Molokai and Maui; critically endangered
- Lobelia grayana E.Wimm. – eastern Maui; critically endangered
- Lobelia hillebrandii Rock – Maui; critically endangered
- Lobelia hypoleuca Hillebr. - endangered
- Lobelia × kauaensis - Kauai; critically endangered
- Lobelia koolauensis (Hosaka & Fosberg) Lammers – Oahu: northern Koʻolau Range
- Lobelia monostachya (Rock) Lammers - Oahu: southern Koʻolau Range; critically endangered
- Lobelia niihauensis H.St.John - Niihau, Kauai, and Oahu; endangered
- Lobelia oahuensis Rock - Oahu; critically endangered
- Lobelia remyi Rock - Oahu; endangered
- Lobelia villosa (Rock) H.St.John & Hosaka - north-central Kauai; critically endangered
- Lobelia wahiawa Lammers – central Kauai
- Lobelia yuccoides Hillebr. - Kauai and Oahu; critically endangered
- Trematolobelia Zahlbr. ex Rock
  - † Trematolobelia auriculata H.St.John – Lanai; last recorded in 1916
  - Trematolobelia grandifolia (Rock) O.Deg. - critically endangered
  - Trematolobelia kaalae (O.Deg.) Lammers – Oahu: Waianae Mts.
  - Trematolobelia kauaiensis (Rock) Skottsb. - Kauai; critically endangered
  - Trematolobelia macrostachys (Hook. & Arn.) Zahlbr. ex Rock - critically endangered
  - † Trematolobelia rockii H.St.John – Molokai; last recorded in 1910
  - Trematolobelia singularis H.St.John - critically endangered
  - Trematolobelia wimmeri O.Deg. & I.Deg.

===== Goodeniaceae =====
- Scaevola × cerasifolia Skottsb. (S. gaudichaudiana × S. mollis)
- Scaevola chamissoniana Gaudich.
- Scaevola coriacea Nutt.
- Scaevola gaudichaudiana Cham.
- Scaevola gaudichaudii Hook. & Arn.
- Scaevola glabra Hook. & Arn.
- Scaevola hobdyi W.L.Wagner – western Maui
- Scaevola kilaueae O.Deg.
- Scaevola mollis Hook. & Arn.
- Scaevola procera Hillebr.

==== Boraginales ====
===== Boraginaceae =====
- Nama sandwicensis A.Gray

==== Brassicales ====
===== Brassicaceae =====
- Lepidium arbuscula Hillebr.
- Lepidium bidentatum var. owaihiense (Cham. & Schltdl.) Fosberg
- † Lepidium bidentatum var. remyi (Drake) Fosberg – Hawaii; last recorded in 1949.
- Lepidium orbiculare H.St.John
- Lepidium serra H.Mann

===== Capparaceae =====
- Capparis sandwichiana DC.

==== Caryophyllales ====
===== Amaranthaceae =====
- Achyranthes mutica A.Gray – Kauai, Hawaii
- Achyranthes splendens Mart. ex Moq.
  - Achyranthes splendens var. atollensis (H.St.John) Govaerts – Kure, Midway, Pearl and Hermes, Laysan
  - Achyranthes splendens var. rotundata Hillebr. – Molokai, Lanai, Oahu
  - Achyranthes splendens var. splendens – Maui, Lanai
- †Aerva sericea Moq. – Last observed in 1836
- Amaranthus brownii Christoph. & Caum
- Charpentiera densiflora Sohmer – Kauai
- Charpentiera elliptica (Hillebr.) A.Heller – Kauai
- Charpentiera obovata Gaudich.
- Charpentiera ovata Gaudich. – Oahu, Maui, Hawaii
- Charpentiera tomentosa Sohmer
- Chenopodium oahuense (Meyen) Aellen
- Nototrichium Hillebr.
  - Nototrichium divaricatum Lorence (synonym Achyranthes divaricata (Lorence) Di Vincenzo, Berends., Wondafr. & Borsch)
  - Nototrichium humile Hillebr. (synonym Achyranthes humilis (Hillebr.) Di Vincenzo, Berends., Wondafr. & Borsch)
  - Nototrichium sandwicense (A.Gray) Hillebr. (synonym Achyranthes sandwicensis (A.Gray) Di Vincenzo, Berends., Wondafr. & Borsch)

===== Caryophyllaceae =====
- Schiedea Cham. & Schltdl.
  - Schiedea adamantis H.St.John – Diamond Head schiedea (Oʻahu, Hawaii)
  - Schiedea amplexicaulis H.Mann
  - Schiedea apokremnos H.St.John
  - Schiedea attenuata W.L.Wagner, Weller & Sakai
  - Schiedea diffusa A.Gray
  - Schiedea globosa H.Mann
  - Schiedea haakoaensis W.L.Wagner, Weller & A.K.Sakai
  - Schiedea haleakalensis O.Deg. & Sherff
  - Schiedea hawaiiensis Hillebr.
  - Schiedea helleri Sherff
  - Schiedea hookeri A.Gray
  - Schiedea implexa (Hillebr.) Sherff
  - Schiedea jacobii W.L.Wagner, Weller & A.C.Medeiros
  - Schiedea kaalae Wawra – Maʻoliʻoli (Oʻahu, Hawaii)
  - Schiedea kauaiensis H.St.John
  - Schiedea kealiae Caum & Hosaka
  - Schiedea laui W.L.Wagner & Weller
  - Schiedea ligustrina Cham. & Schltdl.
  - Schiedea lychnoides Hillebr.
  - Schiedea lydgatei Hillebr.
  - Schiedea mannii H.St.John
  - Schiedea membranacea H.St.John
  - Schiedea menziesii Hook.
  - Schiedea nuttallii Hook.
  - Schiedea obovata (Sherff) W.L.Wagner & Weller
  - Schiedea pentandra W.L.Wagner & E.Harris
  - Schiedea perlmanii W.L.Wagner & Weller
  - Schiedea pubescens Hillebr.
  - Schiedea salicaria Hillebr.
  - Schiedea sarmentosa O.Deg. & Sherff
  - Schiedea spergulina A.Gray
  - Schiedea stellarioides H.Mann
  - Schiedea trinervis (H.Mann) Pax & K.Hoffm.
  - Schiedea verticillata F.Br. – Nīhoa carnation (Nīhoa, Northwestern Hawaiian Islands)
  - Schiedea viscosa H.Mann
- Silene alexandri Hillebr.
- Silene cryptopetala Hillebr. – eastern Maui: Haleakala
- Silene degeneri Sherff – eastern Maui: Haleakala
- Silene hawaiiensis Sherff
- Silene lanceolata A.Gray
- Silene perlmanii W.L.Wagner
- Silene struthioloides A.Gray

===== Nyctaginaceae =====
- Boerhavia herbstii Fosberg
- Ceodes wagneriana (Fosberg) E.F.S.Rossetto & Caraballo – Kauai
- Rockia Heimerl
  - Rockia sandwicensis (Hillebr.) Heimerl

===== Phytolaccaceae =====
- Phytolacca sandwicensis Endl.

===== Polygonaceae =====
- Rumex albescens Hillebr.
- Rumex giganteus W.T.Aiton
- Rumex skottsbergii O.Deg. & I.Deg.

===== Portulacaceae =====
- Portulaca molokiniensis Hobdy
- Portulaca sclerocarpa A.Gray
- Portulaca villosa Cham.

==== Cornales ====
===== Hydrangeaceae =====
- Kanawao (Hydrangea arguta (Gaudich.) Y.De Smet & Granados)

==== Cucurbitales ====
===== Begoniaceae =====
- Hillebrandia Oliv.
  - Hillebrandia sandwicensis Oliv.

===== Cucurbitaceae =====
- Sicyos albus (H.St.John) I.Telford
- Sicyos anunu (H.St.John) I.Telford
- Sicyos cucumerinus A.Gray
- Sicyos erostratus H.St.John
- Sicyos herbstii (H.St.John) I.Telford
- † Sicyos hillebrandii H.St.John – eastern Maui: Kula
- Sicyos hispidus Hillebr.
- Sicyos lanceoloideus (H.St.John) W.L.Wagner & D.R.Herbst
- Sicyos lasiocephalus Skottsb.
- Sicyos macrophyllus A.Gray
- Sicyos maximowiczii Cogn.
- Sicyos pachycarpus Hook. & Arn.
- Sicyos semitonsus H.St.John – Lanai
- Sicyos waimanaloensis H.St.John

==== Ericales ====
===== Ebenaceae =====
- Diospyros hillebrandii (Seem.) Fosberg – Kauai and Oahu
- Diospyros sandwicensis (A.DC.) Fosberg

===== Ericaceae =====
- Vaccinium calycinum Sm.
- Vaccinium dentatum Sm.
- Vaccinium reticulatum Sm.

===== Pentaphylacaceae =====
- Eurya sandwicensis A.Gray

===== Primulaceae =====
- Embelia pacifica Hillebr.
- Lysimachia daphnoides (A.Gray) Hillebr. – Kauai
- Lysimachia filifolia C.N.Forbes & Lydgate – Oahu and Kauai
- Lysimachia forbesii Rock – Oahu: Ko'olau Range; Castle Trail
- Lysimachia glutinosa Rock – Kauai
- Lysimachia hillebrandii Hook.f. ex A.Gray
- Lysimachia iniki K.L.Marr – Kauai
- Lysimachia kalalauensis Skottsb. – Kauai
- Lysimachia lydgatei Hillebr. – western Maui
- Lysimachia pendens K.L.Marr – Kauai
- Lysimachia remyi Hillebr. – Molokai and Maui
- Lysimachia scopulensis K.L.Marr – Kauai
- Lysimachia venosa (Wawra) H.St.John – Kauai: Mt. Waialeale
- Myrsine alyxifolia Hosaka – Kauai
- Myrsine degeneri Hosaka
- Myrsine denticulata (Wawra) Hosaka – Kauai
- Myrsine fernseei (Mez) Hosaka
- Myrsine fosbergii Hosaka
- Myrsine helleri (O.Deg. & I.Deg.) H.St.John – Kauai
- Myrsine juddii Hosaka
- Myrsine kauaiensis Hillebr. – Kauai
- Myrsine knudsenii (Rock) Hosaka
- Myrsine lanaiensis Hillebr.
- Myrsine lessertiana A.DC.
- Myrsine linearifolia Hosaka
- Myrsine mezii Hosaka – Kauai: Hanapepe Ridge
- Myrsine petiolata Hosaka
- Myrsine pukooensis (H.Lév.) Hosaka
- Myrsine punctata (H.Lév.) Wilbur
- Myrsine sandwicensis A.DC.
- Myrsine vaccinioides W.L.Wagner
- Myrsine wawrae (Mez) Hosaka

===== Sapotaceae =====
- Planchonella sandwicensis (A.Gray) Pierre
- Planchonella spathulata (Hillebr.) Pierre

==== Fabales ====
===== Fabaceae =====
- Acacia koa A.Gray (synonym Acacia koaia Hillebr.) - vulnerable
- Canavalia galeata (Gaudich.) Vogel – Oahu
- Canavalia hawaiiensis O.Deg., I.Deg. & J.D.Sauer
- Canavalia kauaiensis J.D.Sauer – Kauai
- Canavalia mauiensis H.St.John
- Canavalia molokaiensis O.Deg., I.Deg. & J.D.Sauer – eastern Molokai
- Canavalia napaliensis H.St.John – Kauai
- Canavalia pubescens Hook. & Arn.
- Erythrina sandwicensis O.Deg.
- Kanaloa Lorence & K.R.Wood
  - Kanaloa kahoolawensis Lorence & K.R.Wood
- Mezoneuron kauaiense (H.Mann) Hillebr.
- Mucuna persericea (Wilmot-Dear) T.M.Moura & A.M.G.Azevedo – eastern Maui
- Sesbania tomentosa Hook. & Arn.
- Māmane (Sophora chrysophylla (Salisb.) Seem.)
- Strongylodon ruber Vogel
- Vicia menziesii Spreng. – Hawaii
- Vigna owahuensis Vogel

==== Gentianales ====
===== Apocynaceae =====
- Ochrosia compta K.Schum. – Oahu, Molokai
- Ochrosia haleakalae H.St.John – E. Maui, Hawaii
- Ochrosia kauaiensis H.St.John – Kauai
- Ochrosia kilaueaensis H.St.John – Hawaii
- Pteralyxia K.Schum.
  - Pteralyxia kauaiensis Caum – Kauai
  - Pteralyxia laurifolia (Reider) Leeuwenb. – Oahu
- Rauvolfia sandwicensis A.DC.

===== Gentianaceae =====
- Schenkia sebaeoides (A.Gray) Griseb.

===== Loganiaceae =====
- Geniostoma cyrtandrae Baill.
- Geniostoma degeneri (Sherff) Byng & Christenh.
- Geniostoma gaudichaudii B.J.Conn
- Geniostoma hedyosmifolium (Baill.) Byng & Christenh.
- Geniostoma helleri (Sherff) Byng & Christenh.
- Geniostoma hirtellum (H.Mann) Byng & Christenh.
- Geniostoma hosakanum (Sherff) Byng & Christenh.
- Geniostoma hymenopodum (O.Deg. & Sherff) Byng & Christenh.
- Geniostoma kaalae (C.N.Forbes) K.L.Gibbons, B.J.Conn & Henwood
- Geniostoma lorencianum (K.R.Wood, W.L.Wagner & T.J.Motley) Byng & Christenh.
- Geniostoma lydgatei (C.N.Forbes) Byng & Christenh.
- Geniostoma pumilum (Hillebr.) Byng & Christenh.
- Geniostoma tinifolium (A.Gray) B.J.Conn
- Geniostoma triflorum (Hillebr.) Byng & Christenh. – southeastern Molokai
- Geniostoma venosum (Sherff) Byng & Christenh.
- Geniostoma waialealae (Wawra) Byng & Christenh.
- Geniostoma waiolani (Wawra) Byng & Christenh.

===== Rubiaceae =====
- Bobea brevipes A.Gray – Kauai and Oahu
- Bobea elatior Gaudich.
- Bobea sandwicensis (A.Gray) Hillebr.
- Bobea timonioides (Hook.f.) Hillebr. – Hawaii and Maui
- Coprosma cordicarpa J.Cantley, Sporck-Koehler & Chau
- Coprosma cymosa Hillebr. – Leeward Is.
- Coprosma elliptica W.R.B.Oliv. – Kauai
- Coprosma ernodeoides A.Gray – Hawaii and Maui
- Coprosma foliosa A.Gray
- Coprosma kauensis (A.Gray) A.Heller – Kauai
- Coprosma kawaikiniensis K.R.Wood, Lorence & Kiehn
- Coprosma longifolia A.Gray – Oahu
- Coprosma menziesii A.Gray Hawaii
- Coprosma × molokaiensis H.St.John (C. ochracea × C. ternata) – eastern Molokai
- Coprosma montana Hillebr. – Hawaii and eastern Maui
- Coprosma ochracea W.R.B.Oliv.
- Coprosma pubens A.Gray
- Coprosma rhynchocarpa A.Gray – Hawaii
- Coprosma stephanocarpa Hillebr. – Maui
- Coprosma ternata W.R.B.Oliv. – eastern Molokai
- Coprosma waimeae Wawra – Kauai
- Na'u (Gardenia brighamii H.Mann) - Hawaii and western Maui; critically endangered
- Gardenia mannii H.St.John & Kuykendall – Oahu
- Gardenia remyi H.Mann
- Gynochthodes trimera (Hillebr.) Razafim. & B.Bremer
- Kadua acuminata Cham. & Schltdl.
- Kadua affinis Cham. & Schltdl.
- Kadua axillaris (Wawra) W.L.Wagner & Lorence – Hawaii, Maui, and Molokai
- Kadua centranthoides Hook. & Arn.
- Kadua cookiana Cham. & Schltdl. – Hawaii and Kauai
- Kadua cordata Cham. & Schltdl.
- Kadua coriacea (Sm.) W.L.Wagner & Lorence – Hawaii and Maui
- Kadua degeneri (Fosberg) W.L.Wagner & Lorence – Oahu: Waianae Mts.
- Kadua elatior (H.Mann) A.Heller
- Kadua fluviatilis C.N.Forbes
- Kadua flynnii (W.L.Wagner & Lorence) W.L.Wagner & Lorence – Kauai
- Kadua foggiana (Fosberg) W.L.Wagner & Lorence – Kauai
- † Kadua foliosa Hillebr. – eastern Maui: Southwest Slope, Haleaka
- Kadua formosa Hillebr. – western Maui
- † Kadua haupuensis Lorence & W.L.Wagner
- Kadua knudsenii Hillebr. – Kauai
- Kadua laxiflora H.Mann – Molokai, Lanai, and western Maui
- Kadua littoralis Hillebr.
- Kadua munroi (Fosberg) Govaerts – Oahu and Lanai
- Kadua parvula A.Gray – Oahu: Waianae Mts.
- Kadua st-johnii (B.C.Stone & Lane) W.L.Wagner & Lorence – Kauai
- Kadua tryblium (D.R.Herbst & W.L.Wagner) W.L.Wagner & Lorence eastern Windward Is. and Kauai
- Psychotria fauriei (H.Lév.) Fosberg – Oahu: Koolau Range
- Psychotria grandiflora H.Mann – Kauai
- Psychotria greenwelliae Fosberg – Kauai
- Psychotria hathewayi Fosberg
- Psychotria hawaiiensis (A.Gray) Fosberg
- Psychotria hexandra H.Mann – Kauai and Oahu
- Psychotria hobdyi Sohmer – Kauai
- Psychotria kaduana (Cham. & Schltdl.) Fosberg
- Psychotria mariniana (Cham. & Schltdl.) Fosberg
- Psychotria mauiensis Fosberg
- Psychotria wawrae Sohmer – eastern Kauai

==== Geraniales ====
===== Geraniaceae =====
- Geranium arboreum A.Gray – Maui
- Geranium cuneatum Hook. – western and central Hawaii
- Geranium hanaense A.C.Medeiros & H.St.John – eastern Maui
- Geranium hillebrandii Aedo & Muñoz Garm. – northwestern Maui
- Geranium kauaiense (Rock) H.St.John – Kauai
- Geranium multiflorum A.Gray – eastern Maui

==== Gunnerales ====
===== Gunneraceae =====
- Gunnera kauaiensis Rock – Kauai
- Gunnera petaloidea Gaudich.

==== Huerteales ====
===== Dipentodontaceae =====
- Perrottetia sandwicensis A.Gray
- Perrottetia wichmaniorum Lorence & W.L.Wagner – Kauai

==== Isoetales ====
===== Isoetaceae =====
- Isoetes hawaiiensis W.C.Taylor & W.H.Wagner – Maui and Hawaii

==== Lamiales ====
===== Gesneriaceae =====
- Cyrtandra × alata H.St.John & Storey (C. hawaiensis × C. laxiflora)
- Cyrtandra × alnea H.St.John (C. paludosa × C. ?)
- Cyrtandra × ambigua (Hillebr.) H.St.John & Storey (C. paludosa × C. polyantha)
- Cyrtandra × arguta (A.Gray) C.B.Clarke (C. paludosa × C. platyphylla)
- Cyrtandra × atomigyna H.St.John & Storey (C. hawaiensis × C. kalihii)
- Cyrtandra × axilliflora H.St.John & Storey (C. kalihii × C. subumbellata)
- Cyrtandra × basipartita H.St.John – (C. kalihii × C. propinqua)
- Cyrtandra biserrata Hillebr. – eastern Molokai
- Cyrtandra calpidicarpa (Rock) H.St.John & Storey – Oahu
- Cyrtandra × carinata H.St.John & Storey (C. cordifolia × C. lessoniana)
- Cyrtandra × caudatisepala H.St.John (C. calpidicarpa × C. propinqua)
- Cyrtandra × caulescens Rock (C. platyphylla × C. spathulata)
- Cyrtandra × christophersenii H.St.John & Storey (C. garnotiana × C. waianaeensis)
- Cyrtandra × cladantha Skottsb. (C. kohalae × C. platyphylla)
- Cyrtandra confertiflora (Wawra) C.B.Clarke
- Cyrtandra × conradtii Rock (C. grayi × C. hawaiensis)
- Cyrtandra cordifolia Gaudich. – Oahu
- Cyrtandra × crassifolia (Hillebr.) Rock (C. cordifolia × C. garnotiana)
- Cyrtandra × crassior H.St.John & Storey (C. cordifolia × C. rivularis)
- Cyrtandra crenata H.St.John & Storey – Oahu
- Cyrtandra × cupuliformis H.St.John & Storey (C. garnotiana × C. lessoniana)
- Cyrtandra cyaneoides Rock – Kauai: Wai'alae Valley
- Cyrtandra dentata H.St.John & Storey – Oahu
- Cyrtandra ferripilosa H.St.John – Maui
- Cyrtandra × ferrocolorata H.St.John (C. hawaiensis × C. propinqua)
- Cyrtandra × ferruginosa H.St.John & Storey (C. cordifolia × C. grandiflora)
- Cyrtandra filipes Hillebr. – Molokai and western Maui
- Cyrtandra × forbesii H.St.John & Storey (C. kaalae × C. laxiflora)
- Cyrtandra garnotiana Gaudich. – Oahu
- Cyrtandra × georgiata C.N.Forbes (C. grayana × C. munroi)
- Cyrtandra giffardii Rock – Hawaii
- Cyrtandra gracilis Hillebr. ex C.B.Clarke – Oahu: Ko'olau Range
- Cyrtandra grandiflora Gaudich. – Oahu
- Cyrtandra grayana Hillebr. – Molokai and western Maui
- Cyrtandra grayi C.B.Clarke – Molokai and Maui
- Cyrtandra halawensis Rock – Molokai
- Cyrtandra hashimotoi Rock – Maui
- Cyrtandra hawaiensis C.B.Clarke
- Cyrtandra heinrichii H.St.John – Kauai
- Cyrtandra hematos H.St.John – eastern Molokai
- Cyrtandra × honolulensis Wawra (C. cordifolia × C. sandwicensis)
- Cyrtandra × hosakae H.St.John & Storey (C. lessoniana × C. paludosa)
- Cyrtandra × kaalae H.St.John & Storey (C. kalihii × C. lessoniana)
- Cyrtandra × kahanaensis H.St.John & Storey (C. garnotiana × C. subumbellata)
- Cyrtandra kalichii Wawra – Oahu
- Cyrtandra kamoolaensis H.St.John – Kauai
- Cyrtandra kauaiensis Wawra – northeast Kauai
- Cyrtandra kaulantha H.St.John & Storey – Oahu
- Cyrtandra kealiae Wawra – Kauai
- Cyrtandra × kipahuluensis H.St.John (C. paludosa × C. spathulata)
- Cyrtandra × kipapaensis H.St.John & Storey (C. cordifolia × C. laxiflora)
- † Cyrtandra kohalae Rock – Hawaii: Kohala Mts.
- Cyrtandra × laevis H.St.John (C. cordifolia × C. paludosa)
- Cyrtandra laxiflora H.Mann – Oahu
- Cyrtandra lessoniana Gaudich. – Oahu
- Cyrtandra longifolia (Wawra) Hillebr. ex C.B.Clarke – Kauai
- Cyrtandra lydgatei Hillebr. – Lanai, eastern Molokai, and western Maui
- Cyrtandra lysiosepala (A.Gray) C.B.Clarke – Hawaii
- Cyrtandra macraei A.Gray – Oahu
- Cyrtandra macrocalyx Hillebr. – Molokai
- Cyrtandra × malacophylla C.B.Clarke (C. hashimotoi × C. platyphylla)
- Cyrtandra × mannii H.St.John & Storey (C. lessoniana × C. waianaeensis)
- Cyrtandra menziesii Hook. & Arn. – Hawaii
- Cyrtandra munroi C.N.Forbes – Lanai
- Cyrtandra nanawaleensis H.St.John – Hawaii
- Cyrtandra × nutans H.St.John (C. grayi × C. platyphylla)
- Cyrtandra oenobarba H.Mann – Kauai
- † Cyrtandra olona C.N.Forbes – Kauai: Wahiawa Mts.
- Cyrtandra × opaeulae H.St.John & Storey (C. dentata × C. laxiflora)
- Cyrtandra oxybapha W.L.Wagner & D.R.Herbst – western Maui
- Cyrtandra paliku W.L.Wagner, K.R.Wood & Lorence – northeastern Kauai
- Cyrtandra paludosa Gaudich.
- Cyrtandra pickeringii A.Gray
- Cyrtandra platyphylla A.Gray – Maui and Hawaii
- Cyrtandra polyantha C.B.Clarke – Oahu
- Cyrtandra procera Hillebr. – Molokai
- Cyrtandra propinqua C.N.Forbes – Oahu
- Cyrtandra pruinosa H.St.John & Storey – Oahu
- Cyrtandra × pubens H.St.John (C. cordifolia × C. kalihii)
- Cyrtandra × ramosissima Rock (C. giffardii × C. platyphylla)
- Cyrtandra rivularis H.St.John & Storey – Oahu
- Cyrtandra × rockii H.St.John & Storey (C. paludosa × C. propinqua)
- Cyrtandra sandwicensis (H.Lév.) H.St.John & Storey – Oahu
- Cyrtandra × scabrella C.B.Clarke (C. kalihii × C. paludosa)
- Cyrtandra sessilis H.St.John & Storey – Oahu
- Cyrtandra spathulata H.St.John – Maui
- Cyrtandra × subintegra H.St.John (C. grandiflora × C. lessoniana)
- Cyrtandra subumbellata (Hillebr.) H.St.John & Storey – Oahu
- Cyrtandra tintinnabula Rock – Hawaii
- Cyrtandra × turbiniformis H.St.John & Storey (C. grandiflora × C. laxiflora)
- Cyrtandra × umbraculiflora Rock (C. kauaiensis × C. wawrae)
- Cyrtandra vespertina H.St.John – Maui
- Cyrtandra × villicalyx H.St.John & Storey (C. cordifolia × C. propinqua)
- Cyrtandra viridiflora H.St.John & Storey – Oahu
- Cyrtandra wagneri Lorence & Perlman – Hawaii
- Cyrtandra waianaeensis H.St.John & Storey – Oahu
- Cyrtandra wainihaensis H.Lév. – Kauai
- Cyrtandra waiolani Wawra – Oahu: Ko'olau Range
- Cyrtandra wawrae C.B.Clarke – Kauai

===== Lamiaceae =====
- Haplostachys (A.Gray) Hillebr.
  - Haplostachys bryanii Sherff – southwestern and central Molokai
  - Haplostachys haplostachya (A.Gray) H.St.John
  - † Haplostachys linearifolia (Drake) Sherff – Maui and Molokai; last recorded in 1928
  - Haplostachys munroi C.N.Forbes – western Lanai
  - † Haplostachys truncata (A.Gray) Hillebr – Maui; last recorded in 1855
- Phyllostegia ambigua (A.Gray) Hillebr. – Hawaii and Maui
- Phyllostegia bracteata Sherff – Maui
- Phyllostegia brevidens A.Gray – Hawaii and eastern Maui
- Phyllostegia electra C.N.Forbes – Kauai
- Phyllostegia floribunda Benth. – Hawaii
- Phyllostegia glabra (Gaudich.) Benth.
- Phyllostegia grandiflora (Gaudich.) Benth. – Oahu
- Phyllostegia haliakalae Wawra – Maui and Molokai
- Phyllostegia helleri Sherff – Kauai: Wai'alae Valley
- † Phyllostegia hillebrandii H.Mann ex Hillebr.
- Phyllostegia hirsuta Benth. – Oahu
- Phyllostegia hispida Hillebr. – eastern Molokai
- Phyllostegia kaalaensis H.St.John – Oahu
- Phyllostegia kahiliensis H.St.John – Kauai
- † Phyllostegia knudsenii Hillebr. – Kauai: Koaie Canyon
- Phyllostegia lantanoides Sherff – Oahu
- Phyllostegia macrophylla (Gaudich.) Benth. – eastern Maui and eastern Hawaii
- Phyllostegia mannii Sherff – eastern Maui and eastern Molokai
- Phyllostegia micrantha H.St.John
- Phyllostegia mollis Benth.
- Phyllostegia parviflora (Gaudich.) Benth.
- Phyllostegia pilosa H.St.John
- Phyllostegia racemosa Benth.
- Phyllostegia renovans W.L.Wagner – northeastern Kauai
- † Phyllostegia rockii Sherff – eastern Maui: Ukelele
- Phyllostegia stachyoides A.Gray
- Phyllostegia variabilis Bitter – Kure Atoll, Midway Atoll, and Laysan; last recorded in 1961
- Phyllostegia velutina (Sherff) H.St.John – Hawaii
- Phyllostegia vestita Benth. – Hawaii
- Phyllostegia waimeae Wawra – Kauai
- Phyllostegia warshaueri H.St.John – Hawaii
- Phyllostegia wawrana Sherff – Kauai: Hanalei and Koke'e
- Phyllostegia × yamaguchii Hosaka & O.Deg. – (P. glabra × P. hirsuta)
- Stenogyne Benth.
  - Stenogyne angustifolia A.Gray
  - Stenogyne bifida Hillebr. – Molokai
  - Stenogyne calaminthoides A.Gray – Hawaii
  - Stenogyne calycosa Sherff – Maui
  - Stenogyne campanulata Weller & Sakai – Kauai
  - † Stenogyne cinerea Hillebr. – E. Maui: Kula
  - Stenogyne cranwelliae Sherff
  - † Stenogyne haliakalae Wawra
  - Stenogyne kaalae Wawra – Oahu
  - Stenogyne kamehamehae Wawra – Maui and Molokai
  - Stenogyne kanehoana O.Deg. & Sherff – Oahu
  - Stenogyne kauaulaensis K.R.Wood & H.Oppenh. – western Maui
  - Stenogyne macrantha Benth. – Hawaii
  - Stenogyne microphylla Benth. – Hawaii and eastern Maui
  - † Stenogyne oxygona O.Deg. & Sherff – Hawaii: Kohala Mts.
  - Stenogyne purpurea H.Mann – Kauai
  - Stenogyne rotundifolia A.Gray – eastern Maui
  - Stenogyne rugosa Benth. – Hawaii and eastern Maui
  - Stenogyne scrophularioides Benth. – Hawaii
  - Stenogyne sessilis Benth. Hawaii, Lanai, and Maui
  - † Stenogyne viridis Hillebr. – western Maui: Ka'anapali

===== Oleaceae =====
- Notelaea sandwicensis (A.Gray) Hong-Wa & Besnard

===== Plantaginaceae =====
- Plantago hawaiensis (A.Gray) Pilg.
- Plantago pachyphylla A.Gray
- Plantago princeps Cham. & Schltdl.

===== Scrophulariaceae =====
- Myoporum stellatum (G.L.Webster) O.Deg. & I.Deg.

==== Laurales ====
===== Lauraceae =====
- Cryptocarya mannii Hillebr. – Kauai and Oahu
- Lindsaea knudsenii Hillebr. – Kauai

==== Liliales ====
===== Smilacaceae =====
- Smilax melastomifolia Sm.

==== Malpighiales ====
===== Euphorbiaceae =====
- Claoxylon sandwicense Müll.Arg.
- Euphorbia arnottiana Endl.
- Euphorbia atrococca A.Heller – Kauai
- Euphorbia celastroides Boiss.
- Euphorbia clusiifolia Hook. & Arn.
- Euphorbia degeneri Sherff
- Euphorbia deppeana Boiss.
- Euphorbia eleanoriae (D.H.Lorence & W.L.Wagner) Govaerts – Kauai
- Euphorbia haeleeleana D.R.Herbst
- Euphorbia halemanui Sherff
- Euphorbia herbstii (W.L.Wagner) Oudejans
- Euphorbia hillebrandii H.Lév.
- Euphorbia kuwaleana O.Deg. & Sherff – western Oahu
- Euphorbia olowaluana Sherff
- Euphorbia remyi A.Gray ex Boiss.
- Euphorbia rockii C.N.Forbes
- Euphorbia skottsbergii Sherff
- Euphorbia sparsiflora A.Heller – Kauai

===== Phyllanthaceae =====
- Antidesma × kapuae Rock (A. platyphyllum × A. pulvinatum) – Hawaii: South Kona
- Antidesma platyphyllum H.Mann
- Antidesma pulvinatum Hillebr.
- Flueggea neowawraea W.J.Hayden
- Phyllanthus distichus Hook. & Arn.

===== Salicaceae =====
- Xylosma crenata (H.St.John) H.St.John – Kauai
- Xylosma hawaiensis Seem.

===== Violaceae =====
- Isodendrion A.Gray
  - Isodendrion hosakae H.St.John – Hawaii
  - Isodendrion laurifolium A.Gray – Kauai and Oahu
  - Isodendrion longifolium A.Gray Kauai and Oahu
  - Isodendrion pyrifolium A.Gray
- Viola chamissoniana Ging. – Oahu
- Viola helena C.N.Forbes & Lydgate – Kauai
- Viola kauaensis A.Gray – Kauai and Oahu
- Viola lanaiensis W.Becker Kanai
- Viola × luciae Skottsb. (V. maviensis × V. robusta)
- Viola maviensis H.Mann
- Viola oahuensis C.N.Forbes – Oahu
- Viola wailenalenae (Rock) Skottsb. – Kauai

==== Malvales ====
===== Malvaceae =====
- Abutilon eremitopetalum Caum
- Abutilon menziesii Seem.
- Abutilon sandwicense (O.Deg.) Christoph. – Oahu
- Gossypium tomentosum Nutt. ex Seem.
- Hibiscadelphus Rock - endemic genus
  - † Hibiscadelphus bombycinus C.N.Forbes – Hawaii: Kawaihae
  - † Hibiscadelphus crucibracteatus Hobdy – Lanai: Puhielelu Ridge
  - Hibiscadelphus distans L.E.Bishop & D.R.Herbst
  - † Hibiscadelphus giffardianus Rock – Hawaii: eastern Mauna Loa
  - † Hualalai hau kuahiwi (Hibiscadelphus hualalaiensis Rock) Hawaii: Pu’u Wa’awa’a; last wild individual died in 1992
  - Hibiscadelphus × puakuahiwi K.Baker & S.Allen (H. giffardianus × H. hualalaiensis)
  - Hibiscadelphus stellatus H.Oppenh. - western Maui
  - † Hibiscadelphus wilderianus Rock Maui: Auwahi; South slope of Haleakala
  - Hibiscadelphus woodii Lorence & W.L.Wagner – Kauai: Kalalau Valley
- Hibiscus arnottianus A.Gray – Oahu
- Yellow hibiscus (Hibiscus brackenridgei A.Gray) - endangered
- Hibiscus clayi O.Deg. & I.Deg.
- Hibiscus kokio Hillebr. ex Wawra
- Hibiscus waimeae A.Heller
- Kokia Lewton - endemic genus
  - Kokia cookei O.Deg. – western Molokai
  - Kokia drynarioides (Seem.) Lewton – Hawaii
  - Kokia kauaiensis (Rock) O.Deg. & Duvel – western Kauai
  - † Kokia lanceolata Lewton – Oahu: Koko Head, Wailupe Valley
- Waltheria pyrolifolia A.Gray – Maui

===== Thymelaeaceae =====
- Wikstroemia bicornuta Hillebr. – Lanai and western Maui
- Wikstroemia forbesii Skottsb. – eastern Molokai
- Wikstroemia furcata (Hillebr.) Rock – Kauai
- † Wikstroemia hanalei Wawra – northern Kauai
- Wikstroemia monticola Skottsb. – eastern Maui
- Wikstroemia oahuensis (A.Gray) Rock
- Wikstroemia phillyreifolia A.Gray – Hawaii
- Wikstroemia pulcherrima Skottsb.
- Wikstroemia sandwicensis Meisn. – Hawaii
- Wikstroemia skottsbergiana Sparre – Hawaii and Kauai
- Wikstroemia uva-ursi A.Gray – Oahu, Molokai, and Maui
- Wikstroemia villosa Hillebr. – eastern Maui

==== Myrtales ====
===== Myrtaceae =====
- Eugenia koolauensis O.Deg. – Molokai and Oahu
- Lehua mamo (Metrosideros macropus Hook. & Arn.) – Oahu
- ʻŌhiʻa lehua (Metrosideros polymorpha Gaudich.)
- Lehua papa (Metrosideros rugosa A.Gray)
- Metrosideros tremuloides (A.Heller) Rock – Oahu
- Metrosideros waialealae (Rock) Rock
- Syzygium sandwicense (A.Gray) Müll.Berol.

==== Piperales ====
===== Piperaceae =====
- Peperomia alternifolia Yunck.
- Peperomia cookiana C.DC.
- † Peperomia degeneri Yunck. – Molokai: Kalua`aha Valley; last recorded in 1928
- Peperomia eekana C.DC.
- Peperomia ellipticibacca C.DC. – Oahu
- Peperomia expallescens C.DC.
- Peperomia globulanthera C.DC.
- Peperomia hesperomannii Wawra – Kauai
- Peperomia hirtipetiola C.DC.
- Peperomia hypoleuca Miq.
- Peperomia kipahuluensis H.H.St.John & Lamoureux – eastern Maui
- Peperomia kokeana Yunck. – Kauai
- Peperomia latifolia Miq.
- Peperomia ligustrina Hillebr.
- Peperomia macraeana C.DC.
- Peperomia mauiensis Wawra
- Peperomia membranacea Hook. & Arn.
- Peperomia oahuensis C.DC. – Kauai and Oahu
- Peperomia obovatilimba C.DC.
- Peperomia remyi C.DC.
- Peperomia rockii C.DC. – eastern Molokai
- Peperomia sandwicensis Miq.
- † Peperomia subpetiolata Yunck. – eastern Maui

==== Poales ====
===== Cyperaceae =====
- Carex alligata Boott
- Carex kauaiensis R.W.Krauss – Kauai
- Carex meyenii Nees
- Carex montis-eeka Hillebr. – Kauai, Maui, and Molokai
- Carex nealiae R.W.Krauss
- Carex wahuensis subsp. wahuensis
- Cyperus fauriei Kük.
- Cyperus hillebrandii Boeckeler
- Cyperus hypochlorus Hillebr.
- Cyperus neokunthianus Kük. – western Maui
- Cyperus pennatiformis Kük.
- Cyperus phleoides var. hawaiiensis (H.Mann) Kük.
- † Cyperus rockii Kük. – Kauai: Wai'alae Valley
- Cyperus sandwicensis Kük.
- Cyperus trachysanthos Hook. & Arn.
- Fimbristylis hawaiiensis Hillebr.
- Gahnia aspera subsp. globosa (H.Mann) J.Kern – Oahu
- Gahnia beecheyi H.Mann
- Gahnia vitiensis subsp. kauaiensis (Benl) T.Koyama
- Morelotia gahniiformis Gaudich.
- Oreobolus furcatus H.Mann
- Rhynchospora chinensis subsp. spiciformis (Hillebr.) T.Koyama
- Rhynchospora rugosa subsp. lavarum (Gaudich.) T.Koyama

===== Joinvilleaceae =====
- Joinvillea ascendens Gaudich. ex Brongn. & Gris

===== Juncaceae =====
- Luzula hawaiiensis Buchenau

===== Poaceae =====
- Agrostis sandwicensis Hillebr.
- Calamagrostis hillebrandii (Munro ex Hillebr.) Hitchc. – Maui
- Cenchrus agrimonioides Trin.
- Deschampsia nubigena Hillebr.
- Dichanthelium cynodon (Reichardt) C.A.Clark & Gould
- Dichanthelium hillebrandianum (Hitchc.) C.A.Clark & Gould
- Dichanthelium isachnoides (Hillebr.) C.A.Clark & Gould
- Dichanthelium koolauense (H.St.John & Hosaka) C.A.Clark & Gould
- Dissochondrus (Hillebr.) Kuntze
  - Dissochondrus biflorus (Hillebr.) Kuntze
- Eragrostis atropioides Hillebr.
- Eragrostis deflexa Hitchc. – Hawaii and Lanai
- Eragrostis fosbergii Whitney – Oahu: Wai'anaea; Mt. Kala to Kolekole Pass
- Eragrostis grandis Hillebr.
- Eragrostis leptophylla Hitchc.
- Eragrostis mauiensis Hitchc. – Lanai, Maui: Wailuku
- Eragrostis monticola (Gaudich.) Hillebr.
- Eragrostis variabilis (Gaudich.) Hook. & Arn.
- Festuca aloha Catalán, Soreng & P.M.Peterson – Kauai
- Festuca hawaiiensis Hitchc.
- Festuca molokaiensis Soreng, P.M.Peterson & Catalán
- Greeneochloa expansa (Munro ex Hillebr.) P.M.Peterson, Romasch. & Soreng
- Isachne pallens Hillebr.
- Koeleria inaequalis (Whitney) Barberá, Quintanar, Soreng & P.M.Peterson
- Panicum beecheyi Hook. & Arn.
- Panicum fauriei Hitchc.
- Panicum konaense Whitney & Hosaka
- Panicum lineale H.St.John
- Panicum longivaginatum H.St.John
- Panicum nephelophilum Gaudich.
- Panicum niihauense H.St.John
- Panicum pellitum Trin.
- Panicum ramosius Hitchc.
- Panicum tenuifolium Hook. & Arn.
- Panicum torridum Gaudich.
- Panicum xerophilum (Hillebr.) Hitchc.
- Poa mannii Munro ex Hillebr. – Kauai
- Poa sandvicensis (Reichardt) Hitchc.
- Poa siphonoglossa Hack.
- Trisetum glomeratum (Kunth) Trin. ex Steud.

==== Oxalidales ====
===== Elaeocarpaceae =====
- Elaeocarpus bifidus Hook. & Arn. – Kauai and Oahu

==== Ranunculales ====
===== Papaveraceae =====
- Argemone glauca (Nutt. ex Prain) Pope

===== Ranunculaceae =====
- Ranunculus hawaiensis A.Gray
- Ranunculus mauiensis A.Gray

==== Rosales ====
===== Rhamnaceae =====
- Alphitonia ponderosa Hillebr.
- Colubrina oppositifolia Brongn. ex H.Mann
- Gouania hillebrandii Oliv. ex Hillebr.
- Gouania meyenii Steud.
- Gouania vitifolia A.Gray

===== Rosaceae =====
- † Acaena exigua A.Gray – Kauai, western Maui; last recorded in 2007
- Fragaria chiloensis subsp. sandwicensis (Decne.) Staudt
- ʻĀkala (Rubus hawaiensis A.Gray)
- ʻĀkalakala (Rubus macraei A.Gray)

===== Urticaceae =====
- Boehmeria grandis (Hook. & Arn.) A.Heller
- Hesperocnide sandwicensis (Wedd.) Wedd.
- Neraudia Gaudich.
  - Neraudia angulata R.S.Cowan
  - Neraudia kauaiensis (Hillebr.) R.S.Cowan
  - Neraudia melastomifolia Gaudich.
  - Neraudia ovata Gaudich.
  - Neraudia sericea Gaudich.
- Māmaki (Pipturus albidus (Hook. & Arn.) A.Gray ex H.Mann)
- Pipturus forbesii Krajina
- Pipturus kauaiensis A.Heller
- Pipturus ruber A.Heller
- Touchardia Gaudich.
  - Touchardia latifolia Gaudich.
  - Touchardia sandwicensis (Wedd.) ined.
- Urera kaalae Wawra – Oahu

==== Salviniales ====
===== Marsileaceae =====
- Marsilea villosa Kaulf. – Niihau, Oahu, and Molokai

==== Santalales ====
===== Santalaceae =====
- Exocarpos gaudichaudii A.DC.
- Exocarpos luteolus C.N.Forbes – Kauai
- Exocarpos menziesii Stauffer – Hawaii and Lanai
- Korthalsella complanata (Tiegh.) Engl.
- Korthalsella degeneri Danser
- Korthalsella latissima (Tiegh.) Danser
- Santalum ellipticum Gaudich.
- Santalum freycinetianum Gaudich. – Oahu
- Santalum haleakalae Hillebr.
- Santalum involutum H.St.John – Kauai
- Santalum paniculatum Hook. & Arn.
- Santalum pyrularium A.Gray – Kauai

==== Sapindales ====
===== Anacardiaceae =====
- Rhus sandwicensis A.Gray

===== Rutaceae =====
- Melicope adscendens (H.St.John & E.P.Hume) T.G.Hartley & B.C.Stone – eastern Maui: Auwahi
- Melicope anisata (H.Mann) T.G.Hartley & B.C.Stone
- Melicope balloui (Rock) T.G.Hartley & B.C.Stone – Maui: Haleakala
- Melicope barbigera A.Gray
- Melicope christophersenii (H.St.John) T.G.Hartley & B.C.Stone – Oahu
- Melicope cinerea A.Gray
- Melicope clusiifolia (A.Gray) T.G.Hartley & B.C.Stone
- † Melicope cornuta (Hillebr.) Appelhans, K.R.Wood & W.L.Wagner Oahu: Ko'olau Range
- Melicope cruciata (A.Heller) T.G.Hartley & B.C.Stone
- Melicope degeneri (B.C.Stone) T.G.Hartley & B.C.Stone – Kauai: Koke'e stream
- Melicope elliptica A.Gray
- Melicope feddei (H.Lév.) T.G.Hartley & B.C.Stone
- Melicope haleakalae (B.C.Stone) T.G.Hartley & B.C.Stone
- Melicope haupuensis (H.St.John) T.G.Hartley & B.C.Stone
- Melicope hawaiensis (Wawra) T.G.Hartley & B.C.Stone
- Melicope hiiakae (B.C.Stone) T.G.Hartley & B.C.Stone
- Melicope hosakae (H.St.John) W.L.Wagner & R.K.Shannon
- Melicope kaalaensis (H.St.John) T.G.Hartley & B.C.Stone
- Melicope kavaiensis (H.Mann) T.G.Hartley & B.C.Stone
- Melicope knudsenii (Hillebr.) T.G.Hartley & B.C.Stone
- Melicope lydgatei (Hillebr.) T.G.Hartley & B.C.Stone – Oahu: Ko'olau Range
- † Melicope macropus (Hillebr.) T.G.Hartley & B.C.Stone – Kauai; last recorded in the late 1800s
- Melicope makahae (B.C.Stone) T.G.Hartley & B.C.Stone
- Melicope molokaiensis (Hillebr.) T.G.Hartley & B.C.Stone
- Melicope mucronulata (H.St.John) T.G.Hartley & B.C.Stone
- Melicope munroi (H.St.John) T.G.Hartley & B.C.Stone
- Melicope nealae (B.C.Stone) T.G.Hartley & B.C.Stone – Kauai; last observed in 1960
- Melicope oahuensis (H.Lév.) T.G.Hartley & B.C.Stone
- Melicope obovata (H.St.John) T.G.Hartley & B.C.Stone – Maui
- Melicope oppenheimeri K.R.Wood
- Melicope orbicularis (Hillebr.) T.G.Hartley & B.C.Stone
- Melicope ovalis (H.St.John) T.G.Hartley & B.C.Stone – eastern Maui: above Hana
- Melicope ovata (H.St.John & E.P.Hume) T.G.Hartley & B.C.Stone
- Melicope pallida (Hillebr.) T.G.Hartley & B.C.Stone
- Melicope paniculata (H.St.John) T.G.Hartley & B.C.Stone – Kauai
- Melicope peduncularis (H.Lév.) T.G.Hartley & B.C.Stone
- Melicope pseudoanisata (Rock) T.G.Hartley & B.C.Stone
- Melicope puberula (H.St.John) T.G.Hartley & B.C.Stone
- Melicope quadrangularis (H.St.John & E.P.Hume) T.G.Hartley & B.C.Stone – Kauai: Wahiawa Swamp
- Melicope radiata (H.St.John) T.G.Hartley & B.C.Stone
- Melicope reflexa (H.St.John) T.G.Hartley & B.C.Stone
- Melicope remyi (Sherff) Appelhans, K.R.Wood & W.L.Wagner
- Melicope rostrata (Hillebr.) Appelhans, K.R.Wood & W.L.Wagner
- Melicope rotundifolia (A.Gray) T.G.Hartley & B.C.Stone
- Melicope saint-johnii (E.P.Hume) T.G.Hartley & B.C.Stone
- Melicope sandwicensis (Gaudich. ex Hook. & Arn.) T.G.Hartley & B.C.Stone
- Melicope sessilis (H.Lév.) T.G.Hartley & B.C.Stone
- Melicope spathulata A.Gray
- Melicope stonei K.R.Wood, Appelhans & W.L.Wagner – northwestern Kauai
- Melicope volcanica (A.Gray) T.G.Hartley & B.C.Stone
- Melicope waialealae (Wawra) T.G.Hartley & B.C.Stone
- † Melicope wailauensis (H.St.John) T.G.Hartley & B.C.Stone – Molokai: Kukuinui Ridge and Wailau Valley
- Melicope wawraeana (Rock) T.G.Hartley & B.C.Stone
- Melicope zahlbruckneri (Rock) T.G.Hartley & B.C.Stone
- Zanthoxylum dipetalum H.Mann
- Zanthoxylum hawaiiense Hillebr.
- Zanthoxylum kauaense A.Gray
- Zanthoxylum oahuense Hillebr.

===== Sapindaceae =====
- Alectryon macrococcus Radlk.
- Sapindus oahuensis Hillebr. ex Radlk.
- Sapindus thurstonii Rock

==== Schizaeales ====
===== Schizaeaceae =====
- Schizaea robusta Baker

==== Solanales ====
===== Convolvulaceae =====
- Bonamia menziesii A.Gray
- Cuscuta sandwichiana Choisy
- Ipomoea tuboides O.Deg. & Ooststr.
- Jacquemontia sandwicensis A.Gray

===== Solanaceae =====
- Nothocestrum A.Gray
  - Nothocestrum breviflorum A.Gray
  - Nothocestrum latifolium A.Gray
  - Nothocestrum longifolium A.Gray
  - Nothocestrum peltatum Skottsb. – Kauai
- Solanum caumii (F.Br.) D.H.R.McClell. – Nihoa
- Solanum hillebrandii H.St.John
- Solanum incompletum Dunal
- Solanum nelsonii Dunal
- Solanum sandwicense Hook. & Arn.

== Fungi ==
- Pholiota peleae
- Rhodocollybia laulaha
- Mycena marasmielloides

=== Hygrophoraceae ===
==== Hygrocybe ====
- Glowing like the sun Hygrocybe lamalama
- Slippery like a fish Hygrocybe pakelo
- Pink rose in the mist or rain forest Hygrocybe noelokelani
- Hygrocybe hapuuae

== See also ==
- Canoe plants
- Endemic birds of Hawaii
- Hawaiian lobelioids
- List of fishes of the Coral Sea
- List of fish of Hawaii
- List of extinct animals of the Hawaiian Islands
- List of Hawaii birds
- List of invasive plant species in Hawaii
- List of animal species introduced to the Hawaiian Islands
- Peripatric speciation on the Hawaiian archipelago
