= Viola lanaiensis =

Conservation status
- Critically Imperiled (NatureServe)

Scientific classification
- Kingdom: Plantae
- Clade: Tracheophytes
- Clade: Angiosperms
- Clade: Eudicots
- Clade: Rosids
- Order: Malpighiales
- Family: Violaceae
- Genus: Viola
- Species: V. lanaiensis

Binomial name
- Viola lanaiensis Becker

Species of plant

Viola lanaiensis is a rare species of flowering plant in the violet family commonly known as the Hawaii violet. It is endemic to Hawaii, where it is known only from the island of Lanai. It is threatened by deer, sheep, and introduced species of plants. It is a federally listed endangered species of the United States.

This plant is a subshrub which grows 10 to 40 centimetres tall. It produces narrow leaves and purple-tinged or purple-veined white flowers. It grows in moist and wet forest habitats.

This species is limited to the island of Lanai, where there are 4 populations containing fewer than 80 plants in total. The plant was brought close to extinction by Axis deer and Mouflon. Remaining plants are now protected in fenced enclosures.
