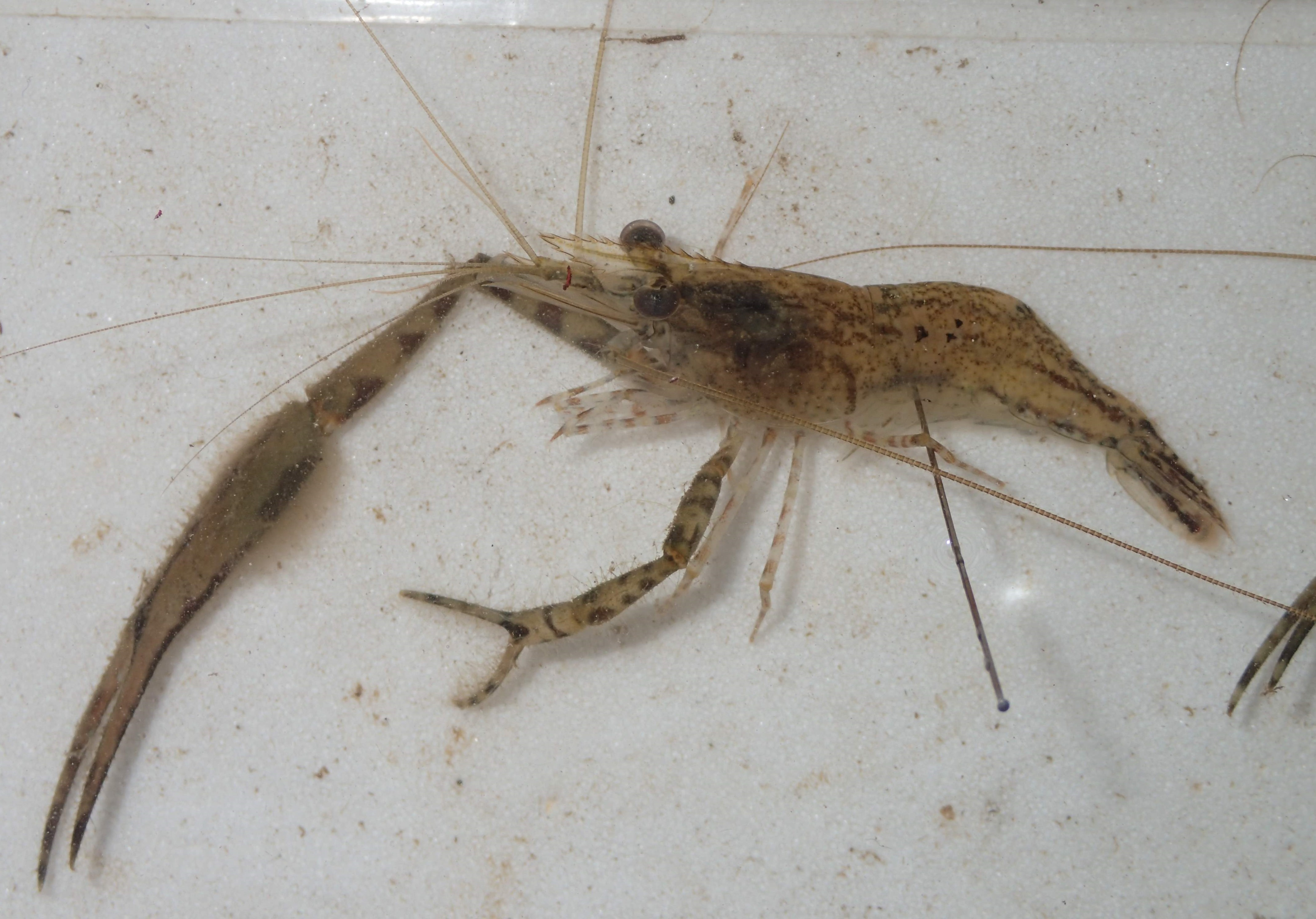

Conservation status
- Least Concern (IUCN 3.1)

Scientific classification
- Kingdom: Animalia
- Phylum: Arthropoda
- Class: Malacostraca
- Order: Decapoda
- Suborder: Pleocyemata
- Infraorder: Caridea
- Family: Palaemonidae
- Genus: Macrobrachium
- Species: M. grandimanus

Binomial name
- Macrobrachium grandimanus Randall, 1840

= Macrobrachium grandimanus =

Species of shrimp

Macrobrachium grandimanus, also called Hawaiian river shrimp or ʻopae ʻoeahaʻa in Hawaiian, is a species of shrimp. It has an amphidromous life cycle and is endemic to the Hawaiʻi islands.

== Description ==
The Hawaiian river shrimp is light to dark brown in color and grows to eight centimeters in length. It has asymmetric pincer claws unlike any other shrimps in Hawaiʻi. They scavenge at the bottom of slow flowing streams for animal and plant material. They reproduce year round with an incubation period lasting approximately three to four weeks. After hatching, the larvae gets washed down into the ocean where they spend a month developing before they return to streams to mature.

== Distribution and habitat ==
Historic distribution includes all the main islands in Hawaiʻi that consist of everlasting streams. They currently can be found high quality streams in Kaua'i, O'ahu, Moloka'i, Maui, and Hawaiʻi as well as wetlands, small ponds, and closed off body of waters.

== Human use ==
Hawaiian river shrimp are not caught for food or used in any way.
