= Cyperus fauriei =

Alpine flatsedge

Conservation status
- Critically Imperiled (NatureServe)

Scientific classification
- Kingdom: Plantae
- Clade: Tracheophytes
- Clade: Angiosperms
- Clade: Monocots
- Clade: Commelinids
- Order: Poales
- Family: Cyperaceae
- Genus: Cyperus
- Species: C. fauriei

Binomial name
- Cyperus fauriei Kük.

Synonyms
- Mariscus fauriei Kük.

Species of plant

Cyperus fauriei is a rare species of sedge known by the common name alpine flatsedge. It is endemic to Hawaii, where it grows on the islands of Molokai and Hawaii. It is a federally listed endangered species of the United States.

This sedge grows 10 to 50 centimeters tall with a solitary stem or a bunch of stems together. The inflorescence is a cluster of flowers with three to five bracts at the base, the lowest bract measuring up to 20 centimeters long. Each flower cluster is made up of a few spikes, which in turn are made up of several spikelets. The spikelet is a flattened array of seven to nine tiny flowers.

Today this plant grows on Molokai and the island of Hawaii; it has been extirpated from Lanai. It is rare on Hawaii, but on parts of Molokai it is locally common, with several thousand plants known. It grows on ridges and in gulches. It is threatened by the loss and degradation of its habitat, which is caused by non-native species of ungulates and plants, agricultural operations, fire, and development.
