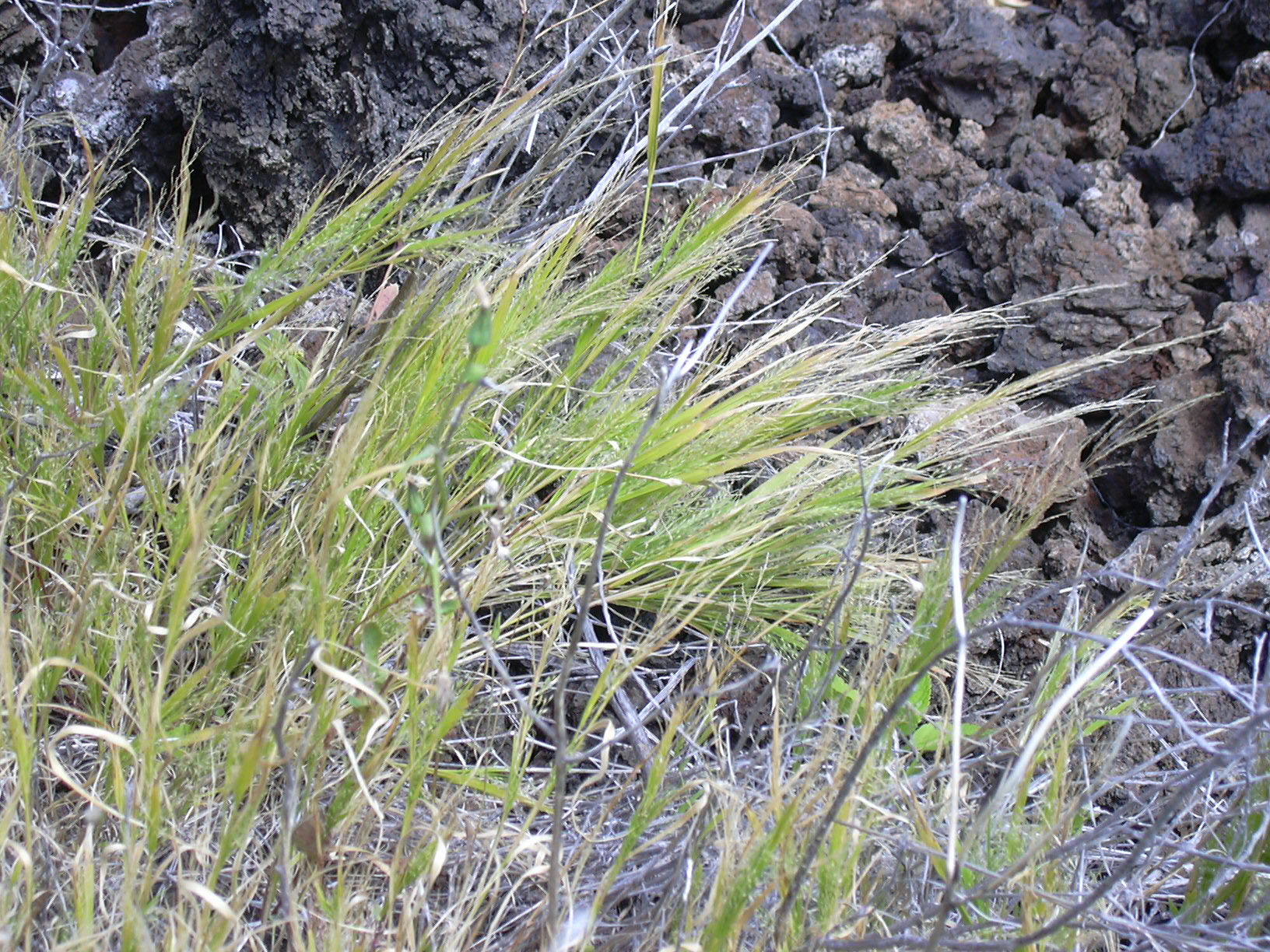

Scientific classification
- Kingdom: Plantae
- Clade: Embryophytes
- Clade: Tracheophytes
- Clade: Angiosperms
- Clade: Monocots
- Clade: Commelinids
- Order: Poales
- Family: Poaceae
- Subfamily: Panicoideae
- Genus: Panicum
- Species: P. konaense

Binomial name
- Panicum konaense Whitney & Hosaka

Synonyms
- Panicum cookei

= Panicum konaense =

Species of grass

Panicum konaense, commonly known as Kona panic grass, is a species of annual grass endemic to Hawaii. It is found on the islands of Hawai'i, Kauai, Maui, and Molokai, where it has been recorded in dry woodlands.

== Description ==
P. konaense is a cespitose grass, which grows in dense clumps of up to 60 cm tall. Stems are unbranched, and leaves are simple. Blades are between 5 and 18 cm long, 0.2-0.5 cm wide, with ciliate and papillose-pilose surfaces.

Spikelets are 1.5-3.9mm in length, acuminate and pilose.

== Etymology ==
The species epithet of P. konaense refers to the Kona region of Hawai'i Island.
