= Festuca molokaiensis =

Scientific classification
- Kingdom: Plantae
- Clade: Tracheophytes
- Clade: Angiosperms
- Clade: Monocots
- Clade: Commelinids
- Order: Poales
- Family: Poaceae
- Subfamily: Pooideae
- Genus: Festuca
- Species: F. molokaiensis

Binomial name
- Festuca molokaiensis Soreng, P.M.Peterson & Catalán

Species of grass

Festuca molokaiensis is a species of grass in the family Poaceae native to Hawaii. This species typically blooms throughout the year and appears in a green or brown colour when blooming. The U.S. Fish & Wildlife Service has classified the species as Endangered.

== Characteristics ==
Festuca molokaiensis grows up to 28 inches tall and fruits caryopsis. This species is a short-lived perennial, is cespitose with culms, scabrous below branched panicles, has inflorescence with spikelets and develops on secondary branches.

== Habitat ==
Festuca molokaiensis typically is found on steep slopes in a mesic forest biome.
