= Cyperus sandwicensis =

Scientific classification
- Kingdom: Plantae
- Clade: Embryophytes
- Clade: Tracheophytes
- Clade: Spermatophytes
- Clade: Angiosperms
- Clade: Monocots
- Clade: Commelinids
- Order: Poales
- Family: Cyperaceae
- Genus: Cyperus
- Species: C. sandwicensis

Binomial name
- Cyperus sandwicensis Kük.

Species of plant endemic to Hawaii

Cyperus sandwicensis, commonly known as the cliffs flatsedge, is a species of sedge that is endemic to Hawaii.

The species was first formally described by the botanist Georg Kükenthal in 1920.

== See also ==
- List of Cyperus species
