= Viola kauaensis =

Conservation status
- Imperiled (NatureServe)

Scientific classification
- Kingdom: Plantae
- Clade: Tracheophytes
- Clade: Angiosperms
- Clade: Eudicots
- Clade: Rosids
- Order: Malpighiales
- Family: Violaceae
- Genus: Viola
- Species: V. kauaensis

Binomial name
- Viola kauaensis A.Gray

Species of flowering plant

Viola kauaensis is a rare species of flowering plant in the violet family known by the common names Kauaʻi violet and pohe hiwa. It is endemic to Hawaii, where it is known from Kauaʻi and Oʻahu.

This plant grows in bogs on Kauaʻi and wet mountain habitat in the Koʻolau Range on Oʻahu.

There are three varieties of this plant. Viola kauaensis var. kauaensis is distributed in bogs and cloud forests in northwestern Kauaʻi. Viola kauaensis var wahiawaensis (nani wai`ale`ale) is distributed on Kauaʻi. In 2003 there were two populations totalling only 13 individuals. Viola kauaensis var. hosakae is a rare variety on Oahu.
