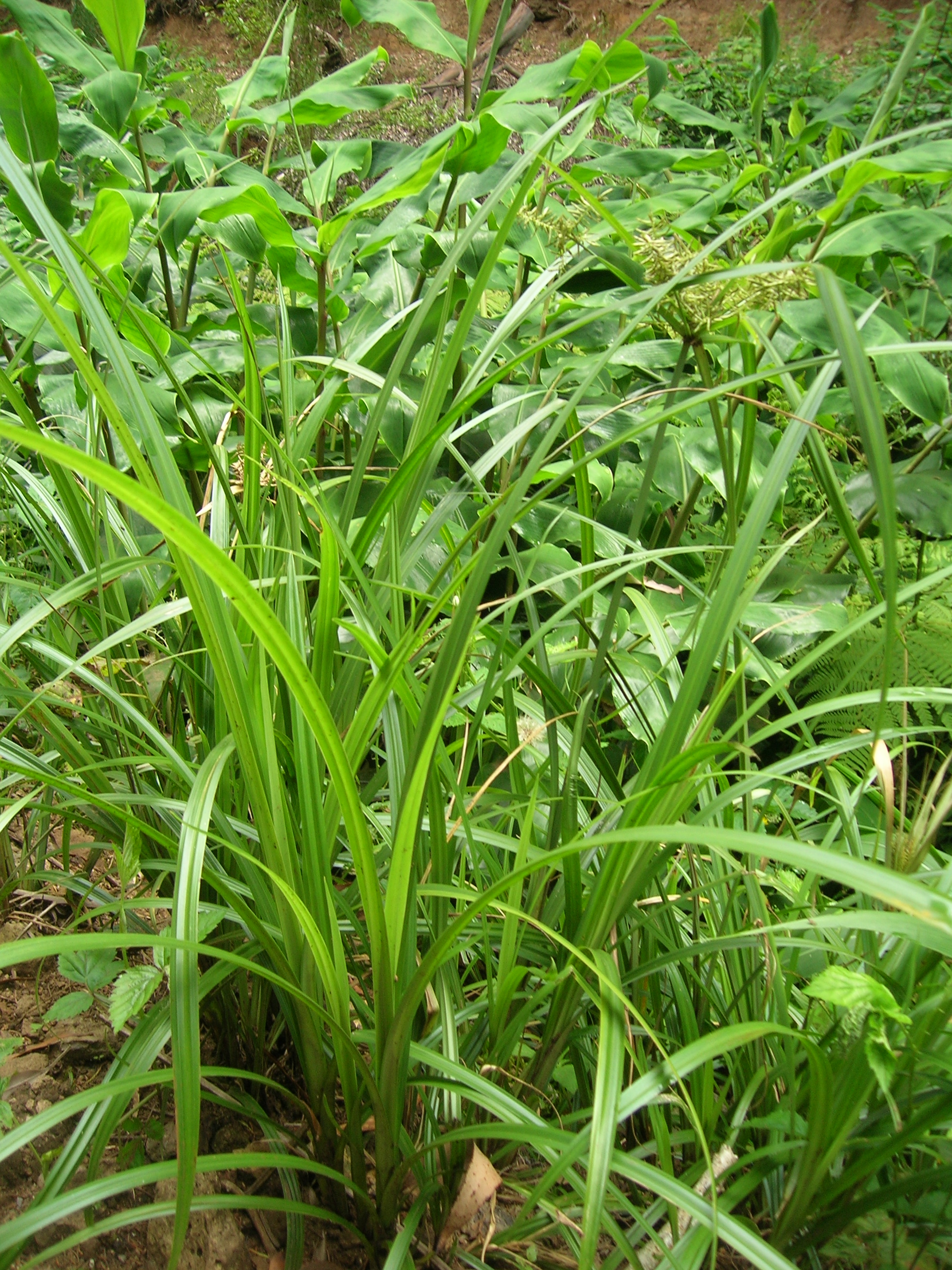

Scientific classification
- Kingdom: Plantae
- Clade: Tracheophytes
- Clade: Angiosperms
- Clade: Monocots
- Clade: Commelinids
- Order: Poales
- Family: Cyperaceae
- Genus: Cyperus
- Species: C. hypochlorus

Binomial name
- Cyperus hypochlorus Hillebr., 1888

= Cyperus hypochlorus =

Species of sedge

Cyperus hypochlorus, commonly known as the Oahu flatsedge, is a species of sedge that is native to parts of Hawaii.

== See also ==
- List of Cyperus species
