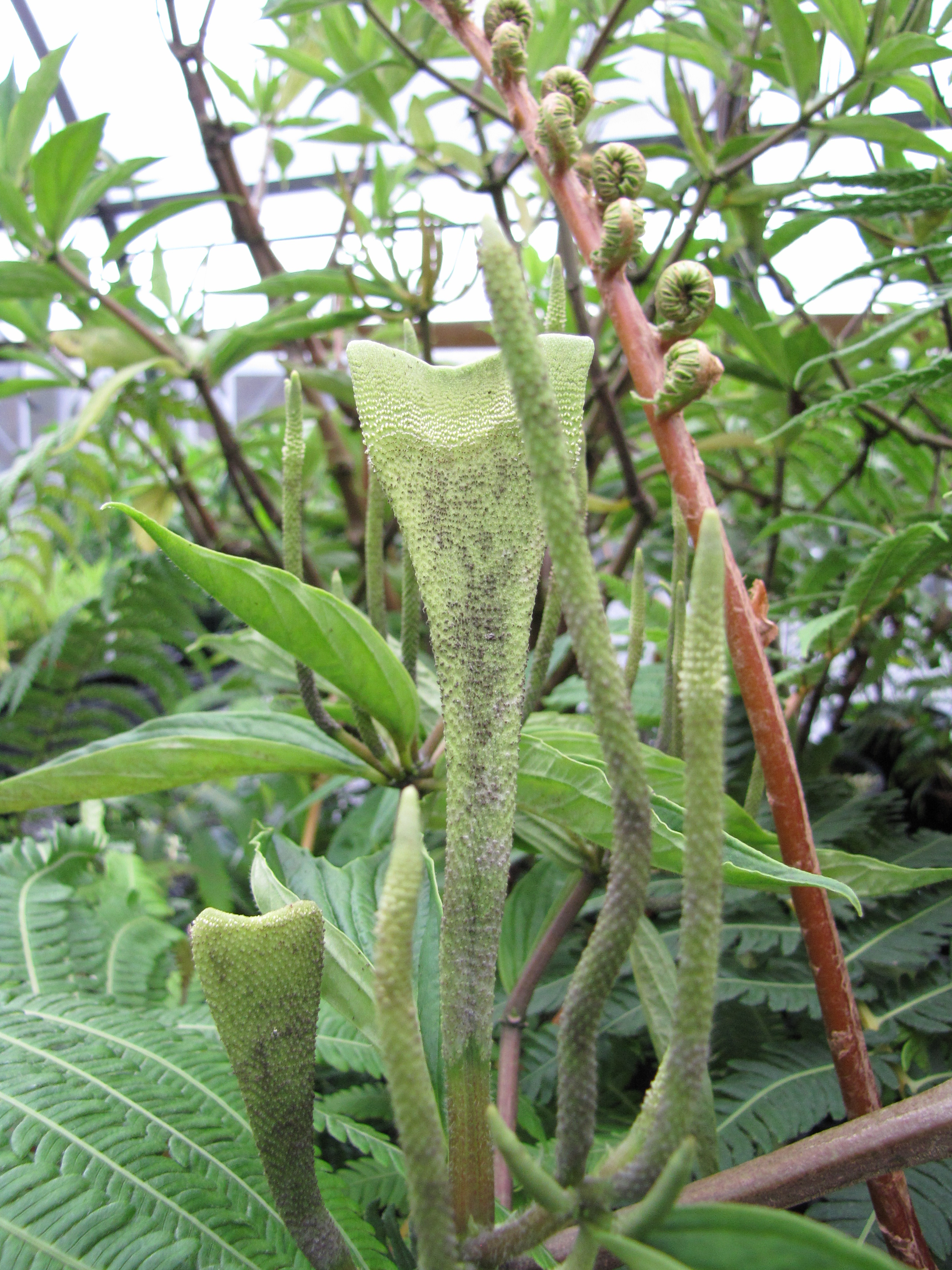

Scientific classification
- Kingdom: Plantae
- Clade: Tracheophytes
- Clade: Angiosperms
- Clade: Magnoliids
- Order: Piperales
- Family: Piperaceae
- Genus: Peperomia
- Species: P. subpetiolata

Binomial name
- Peperomia subpetiolata Yunck.

Synonyms
- Peperomia kulensis C.DC.

= Peperomia subpetiolata =

Species of flowering plant

Peperomia subpetiolata, commonly referred to as Ala Ala Wai Nui or Waikamoi peperomia, is a species of shrub in the genus Peperomia that is endemic in Hawaii. It grows on wet tropical biomes. Its conservation status is Threatened.

== Description ==
The first specimens where collected in Caldas, Colombia.

Peperomia sneidernii is an erect to decumbent herb that roots at the base, reaching up to 8 cm tall. The stem is 1 mm in diameter, unbranched, smooth and hairless, with internodes 3–4 cm long above, lengthening to 12 cm below. The leaves are arranged in whorls of 5 to 8, somewhat fleshy, linear-oblong to lanceolate, up to 3.5 cm broad and 16 cm long, with 5 main veins, the midrib forking in the lower 2–4 cm, and long-tapering apices. The base is wedge-shaped and essentially sessile or with a blade forming wings along a very short stalk. The upper surface is smooth with scattered glandular dots, while the underside is densely covered with fine white hairs when young, becoming hairless with age, and marked with impressed glandular dots. The terminal and axillary spikes are up to 10 cm long and 3 mm thick, densely flowered, on peduncles reaching 3.5 cm. The smooth, hairless rachis has bracts about 6 mm broad. The filaments are longer than the ellipsoid anthers, and the ovary is top-shaped with a stigma that is apical, inconspicuous, and divided.

== Taxonomy and Naming ==
It was described in 1933 by Truman G. Yuncker in Bernice P. Bishop Museum Bulletin 112, from specimens collected by Charles Noyes Forbes. It got its name from description of the species.

== Distribution and Habitat ==
It is endemic in Hawaii. It grows on a shrub environment and is a herb. It grows on wet tropical biomes.

== Conservation ==
This species is assessed as Threatened, in a preliminary report.
