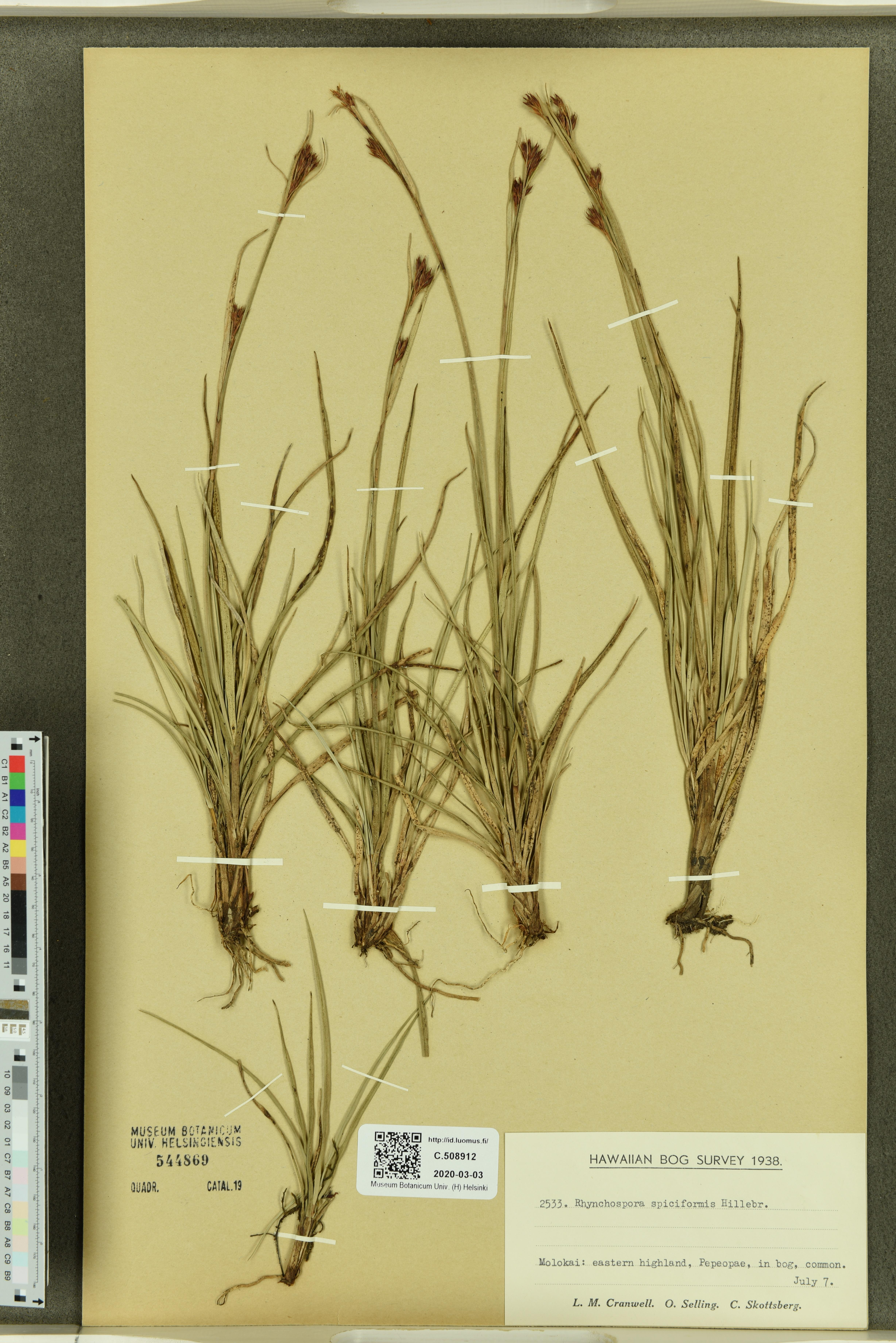

Scientific classification
- Kingdom: Plantae
- Clade: Tracheophytes
- Clade: Angiosperms
- Clade: Monocots
- Clade: Commelinids
- Order: Poales
- Family: Cyperaceae
- Genus: Rhynchospora
- Species: R. chinensis

Binomial name
- Rhynchospora chinensis Nees & Meyen (1834)

Infraspecific taxa
- Rhynchospora chinensis subsp. chinensis Nees & Meyen (1834); Rhynchospora chinensis var. curvoaristata (Tuyama) Ohwi (1944); Rhynchospora chinensis subsp. spiciformis (Hillebr.) T.Koyama (1989)

Synonyms
- Synonymy: Rhynchospora glauca var. chinensis (Nees & Meyen) C.B.Clarke (1893); Rhynchospora japonica Makino (1903); Rhynchospora longisetigera Hayata (1916); Rhynchospora spiciformis Hillebr. (1888)

= Rhynchospora chinensis =

Spiked beaksedge

Species of plant

Rhynchospora chinensis, known by the common name of spiked beaksedge, is a member of the sedge family, Cyperaceae. It is a perennial herb, found in wetlands of Japan, Korea, eastern China, Mainland Southeast Asia, India, Australia, and Madagascar. It was once present in Sri Lanka, where it is now locally extinct. The subspecies R. chinensis subsp. spiciformis is endemic to Hawaii.

Rhynchospora chinensis grows approximately 12 inches tall, and may be found in bogs or wet areas in open pastures. Its greenish-brown spikelets bloom year-round.
