= Dissochondrus =

Scientific classification
- Kingdom: Plantae
- Clade: Tracheophytes
- Clade: Angiosperms
- Clade: Monocots
- Clade: Commelinids
- Order: Poales
- Family: Poaceae
- Subfamily: Panicoideae
- Tribe: Paniceae
- Subtribe: Cenchrinae
- Genus: Dissochondrus (Hillebr.) Kuntze
- Species: D. biflorus

Binomial name
- Dissochondrus biflorus (Hildebr.) Kuntze

Synonyms
- Of the genus: Setaria subg. Dissochondrus Hillebr.; Of the species: Setaria biflora Hildebr.; Setaria bifida Kuntze, orth. var.; Dissochondrus bifidus Kuntze, orth. var.

Species of grass

Dissochondrus, or false bristlegrass, is a genus of Hawaiian plants in the grass family. The only known species is Dissochondrus biflorus.

== Taxonomy ==
The species Dissochondrus biflorus was first described in 1888 by William Hillebrand as Setaria biflora. Hillebrand placed it in a new subgenus of Setaria, S. subg. Dissochondrus. In 1897, Otto Kuntze elevated the subgenus to the full genus Dissochondrus with the sole species becoming Dissochondrus biflorus.
