= Festuca hawaiiensis =

Conservation status
- Critically Imperiled (NatureServe)

Scientific classification
- Kingdom: Plantae
- Clade: Tracheophytes
- Clade: Angiosperms
- Clade: Monocots
- Clade: Commelinids
- Order: Poales
- Family: Poaceae
- Subfamily: Pooideae
- Genus: Festuca
- Species: F. hawaiiensis

Binomial name
- Festuca hawaiiensis Hitchc.

Species of grass

Festuca hawaiiensis, also known as the Hawaii fescue, is a species of grass in the family Poaceae. This species is native to Hawaii. It is perennial and prefers montane tropical biomes. Festuca hawaiiensis was first described in 1922.
