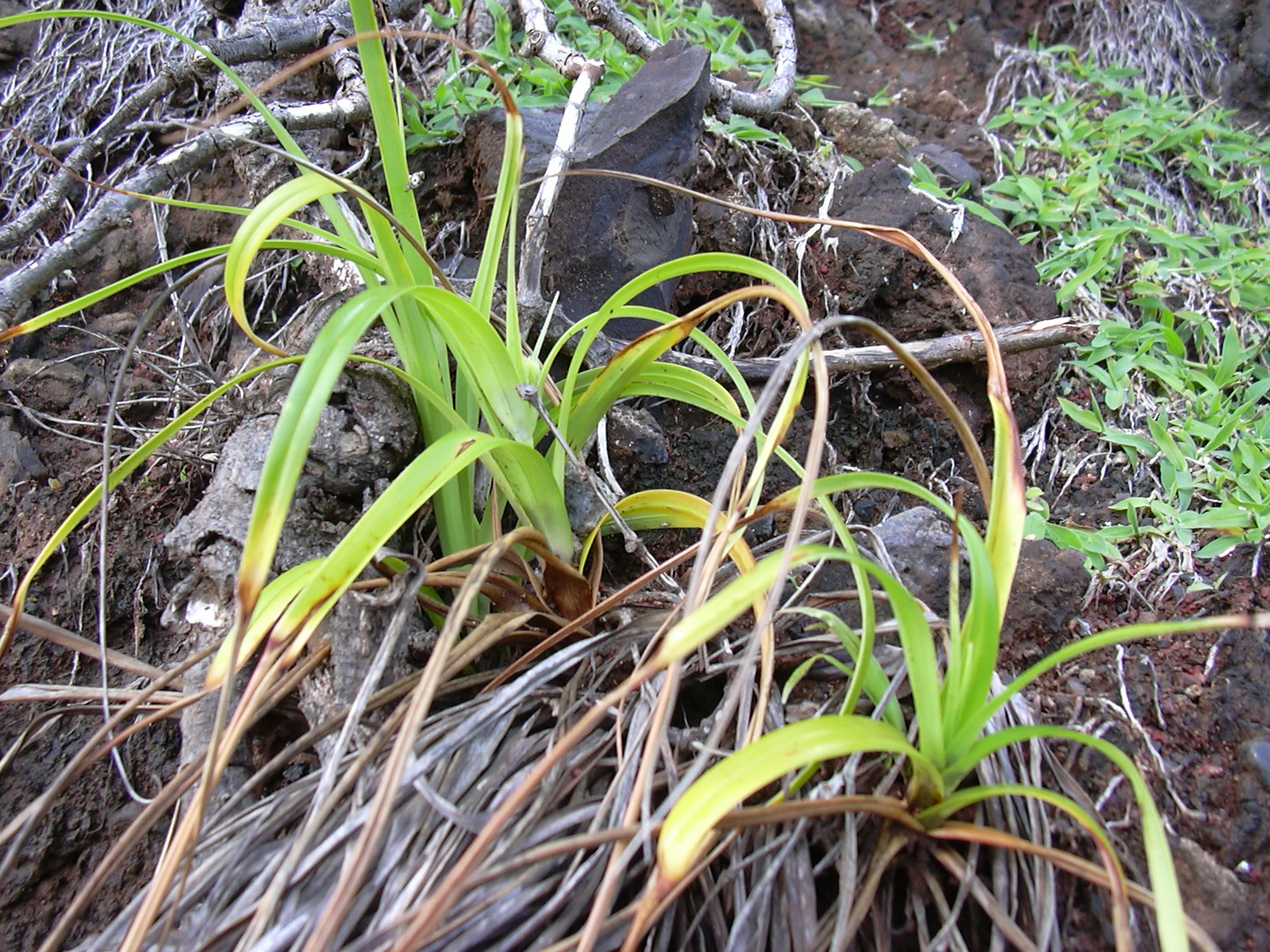

Scientific classification
- Kingdom: Plantae
- Clade: Tracheophytes
- Clade: Angiosperms
- Clade: Monocots
- Clade: Commelinids
- Order: Poales
- Family: Cyperaceae
- Genus: Cyperus
- Species: C. phleoides

Binomial name
- Cyperus phleoides (Nees ex Kunth) H.Mann (1867)

Synonyms
- Mariscus phleoides Nees ex Steud. (1855)

= Cyperus phleoides =

Species of sedge

Cyperus phleoides is a species of sedge that is native to the Hawaiian Islands and Tuamotu Archipelago.

Two varieties are accepted.

- Cyperus phleoides var. hawaiiensis (H.Mann) Kük. (synonym Cyperus hawaiiensis H.Mann) – Hawaiian Islands
- Cyperus phleoides var. phleoides (synonym Cyperus phleoides var. kauaiensis Kük.) – Hawaiian Islands and Tuamotus

== See also ==
- List of Cyperus species
