= Viola helena =

Conservation status
- Critically Imperiled (NatureServe)

Scientific classification
- Kingdom: Plantae
- Clade: Tracheophytes
- Clade: Angiosperms
- Clade: Eudicots
- Clade: Rosids
- Order: Malpighiales
- Family: Violaceae
- Genus: Viola
- Species: V. helena

Binomial name
- Viola helena Forbes & Lydgate

Synonyms
- Viola helena var. lanaiensis Rock

Species of flowering plant

Viola helena, commonly known as Wahiawa stream violet, is a rare species of flowering plant in the violet family. It is endemic to Hawaii, where it is known only from the Wahiawa Mountains of Kauai. It is threatened by exotic plant species and feral pigs. It is a federally listed endangered species of the United States.

== Description ==
Viola helena is a subshrub which can reach 8 meters in height. It has long, narrow leaves and pale purple or white flowers.

== Conservation ==
This species is in decline and its numbers have dropped since the 1990s. There are two populations left, one of which was decimated by a landslide in 2005, leaving only a few seedlings and a seed pod. The other population, containing seven individuals, may be sterile and is too far from the first population to interbreed with it.
