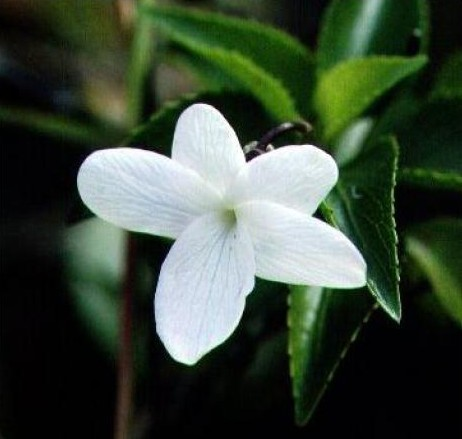

Conservation status
- Critically Imperiled (NatureServe)

Scientific classification
- Kingdom: Plantae
- Clade: Tracheophytes
- Clade: Angiosperms
- Clade: Eudicots
- Clade: Rosids
- Order: Malpighiales
- Family: Violaceae
- Genus: Viola
- Species: V. oahuensis

Binomial name
- Viola oahuensis Forbes

= Viola oahuensis =

Species of flowering plant

Viola oahuensis is a rare species of flowering plant in the violet family known by the common name Oahu violet.

The species is endemic to Hawaii, where it is known only from the Koolau Range on the island of Oahu. It grows along the upper ridges of the Koolau Mountains where the most rain falls.

It is cultivated as an ornamental plant on the island.

== Description ==
The Viola oahuensis plant is a subshrub which grows up to 40 centimetres (16 in) tall. It produces clusters of heart shaped dark green leaves at the ends of its branches. The flowers are white to light lavender.

Conservation

Viola oahuensis is a federally listed endangered species of the United States. This endangered species is threatened by the degradation of its habitat due to the presence of feral pigs. It is also threatened by introduced species of plants in its habitat, such as Glenwood grass (Sacciolepis indica).
