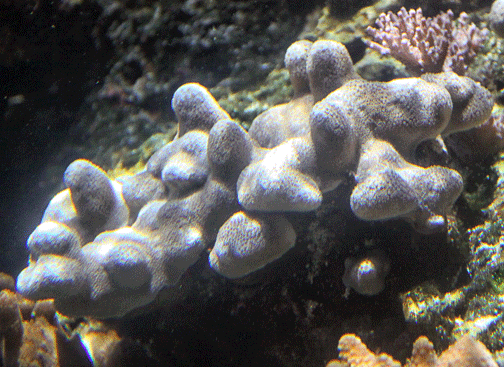

Scientific classification
- Kingdom: Animalia
- Phylum: Cnidaria
- Subphylum: Anthozoa
- Class: Hexacorallia
- Order: Scleractinia
- Family: Poritidae
- Genus: Porites
- Species: P. duerdeni

Binomial name
- Porites duerdeni Vaughan, 1907

= Thick finger coral =

Species of coral

Porites duerdeni, also called thick or knobby finger coral, is a coral in the family Poritidae, representing stoney corals, and is endemic to Hawai'i.

== Distribution and habitat ==
Porites duerdeni is an extremely rare species of colonial reef building finger coral found almost exclusively in Kāne‘ohe Bay, O’ahu. It can be most abundantly found in shallow waters typically ranging from depths of 3–6 ft but can also be found at greater depths that still receive significant sunlight.

== Description ==
Porites duerdeni is a colonial coral and is typically light brown, cream, yellowish, or light green in color with short knub/spherical like branches. Porites duerdeni can be distinctly identified from closely related species by their septa composed of inwardly inclined trabeculae.

== Growth ==
Porites duerdeni growth averages 1–2 cm a year.

== Conservation ==
Porites duerdeni faced severe impacts due to bleaching events in 2015 and 2016, however a small team from the DLNR Division of Aquatic Resources has been working to curb extinction by planting nursery grown P. duerdeni on the reefs of Kāne‘ohe Bay, O’ahu. Porites duerdeni is much more susceptible to coral bleaching than common and dominate corals found in Hawai'i.
