= Sclerophytum molokaiense =

Scientific classification
- Kingdom: Animalia
- Phylum: Cnidaria
- Subphylum: Anthozoa
- Class: Octocorallia
- Order: Malacalcyonacea
- Family: Sarcophytidae
- Genus: Sclerophytum
- Species: S. molokaiense

Binomial name
- Sclerophytum molokaiense (Verseveldt, 1983)

Synonyms
- Sinularia molokaiensis Verseveldt, 1983

Species of soft coral

Sclerophytum molokaiense, commonly known as Molokaʻi leather coral, is species of coral in the family Sarcophytidae endemic to Hawaiʻi.
