= Euphorbia remyi =

Conservation status
- Critically Endangered (IUCN 3.1)

Scientific classification
- Kingdom: Plantae
- Clade: Embryophytes
- Clade: Tracheophytes
- Clade: Spermatophytes
- Clade: Angiosperms
- Clade: Eudicots
- Clade: Rosids
- Order: Malpighiales
- Family: Euphorbiaceae
- Genus: Euphorbia
- Species: E. remyi

Binomial name
- Euphorbia remyi A.Gray ex Boiss.

Synonyms
- Chamaesyce remyi (A.Gray ex Boiss.) Croizat & O.Deg. Euphorbia remyi var. olokelensis Skottsb. & Sherff

Species of flowering plant

Euphorbia remyi is a rare species of flowering plant in the family Euphorbiaceae. It is known by the common name Remy's sandmat locally as ʻakoko. It is endemic to the island of Kauaʻi in Hawaii, where it grows in mixed mesic forests, wet forests and bogs from 150 to 900 m (490 to 2,950 ft).

There are two remaining varieties of this species, vars. remyi and kauaiensis, both of which were federally listed as endangered species in 2010. The third variety, var. hanaleiensis, has been declared extinct, having not been located since the nineteenth century.
