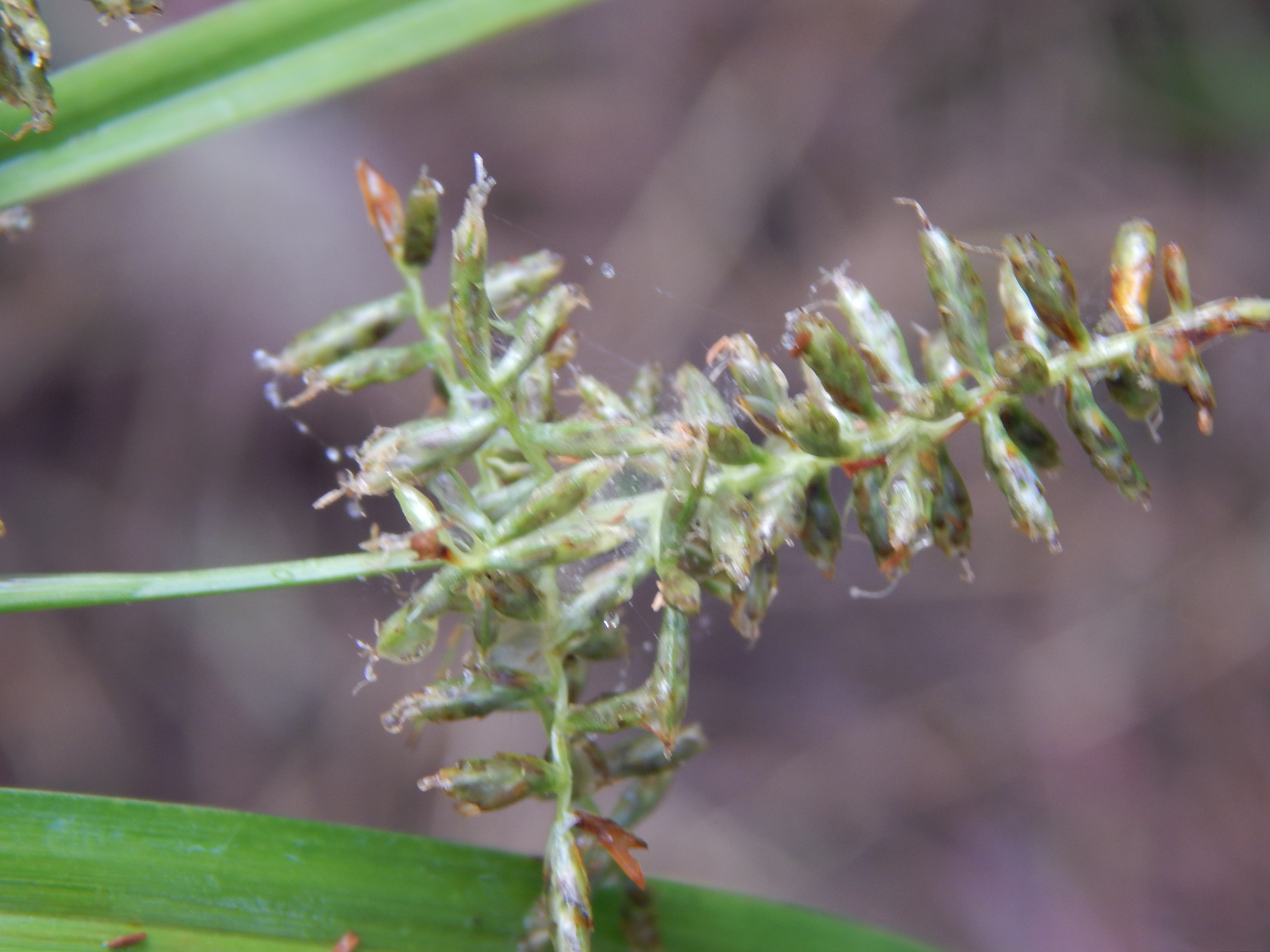

Scientific classification
- Kingdom: Plantae
- Clade: Tracheophytes
- Clade: Angiosperms
- Clade: Monocots
- Clade: Commelinids
- Order: Poales
- Family: Cyperaceae
- Genus: Cyperus
- Species: C. hillebrandii

Binomial name
- Cyperus hillebrandii Boeckeler

= Cyperus hillebrandii =

Species of sedge

Cyperus hillebrandii, commonly known as Hillebrand's flatsedge, is a species of sedge that is endemic to Hawaii.

The species was first formally described by the botanist Johann Otto Boeckeler in 1880.

It has two subspecies:

- Cyperus hillebrandii subsp. decipiens
- Cyperus hillebrandii subsp. hillebrandii

== See also ==
- List of Cyperus species
