= Stenogyne angustifolia =

Conservation status
- Imperiled (NatureServe)

Scientific classification
- Kingdom: Plantae
- Clade: Tracheophytes
- Clade: Angiosperms
- Clade: Eudicots
- Clade: Asterids
- Order: Lamiales
- Family: Lamiaceae
- Genus: Stenogyne
- Species: S. angustifolia

Binomial name
- Stenogyne angustifolia A.Gray

Species of flowering plant

Stenogyne angustifolia is a rare species of flowering plant in the mint family known by the common name narrowleaf stenogyne. It is endemic to Hawaii, where it is known from the island of Hawaii; it has been extirpated from the islands of Molokai and Maui.

This species was formerly divided into several varieties. In 1979 var. angustifolia was federally listed as an endangered species of the United States. None of the varieties are considered valid today; the species has no subtaxa. The species as a whole retains the federal status given to var. angustifolia.

This is a trailing vine with hairy magenta to yellow flowers. The leaves have tiny teeth along the edges. The fruit is somewhat spherical in shape and purple-black in color. This plant grows in forests and shrublands on lava substrates on Hawaii. Most all of the plants are located within the Pohakuloa Training Area. The plants are threatened by fire, feral pigs and other ungulates, and introduced species of plants.
