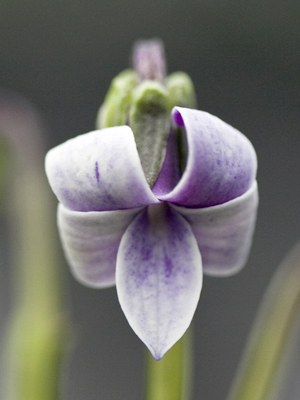

Scientific classification
- Kingdom: Plantae
- Clade: Tracheophytes
- Clade: Angiosperms
- Clade: Eudicots
- Clade: Rosids
- Order: Malpighiales
- Family: Violaceae
- Genus: Viola
- Species: V. maviensis

Binomial name
- Viola maviensis H.Mann

Synonyms
- Heterotypic Synonyms: Viola hawaiiensis H.St.John; Viola kohalana (Rock) H.St.John; Viola maviensis var. kohalana Rock; Viola rockii H.St.John

= Viola maviensis =

Species of flowering plant

Viola maviensis a species of flowering plant in the family Violaceae. This woody-stemmed violet is sometimes referred to by the commonly name Hawai'i bog violet.

== Range ==
Viola maviensis is endemic to the islands of Maui, Molokai, and Hawaii in the United States.

== Habitat ==
Viola maviensis occurs in open bogs, or rarely bog margins, at elevations of 1220–2010 m (~4000–6600 ft).
