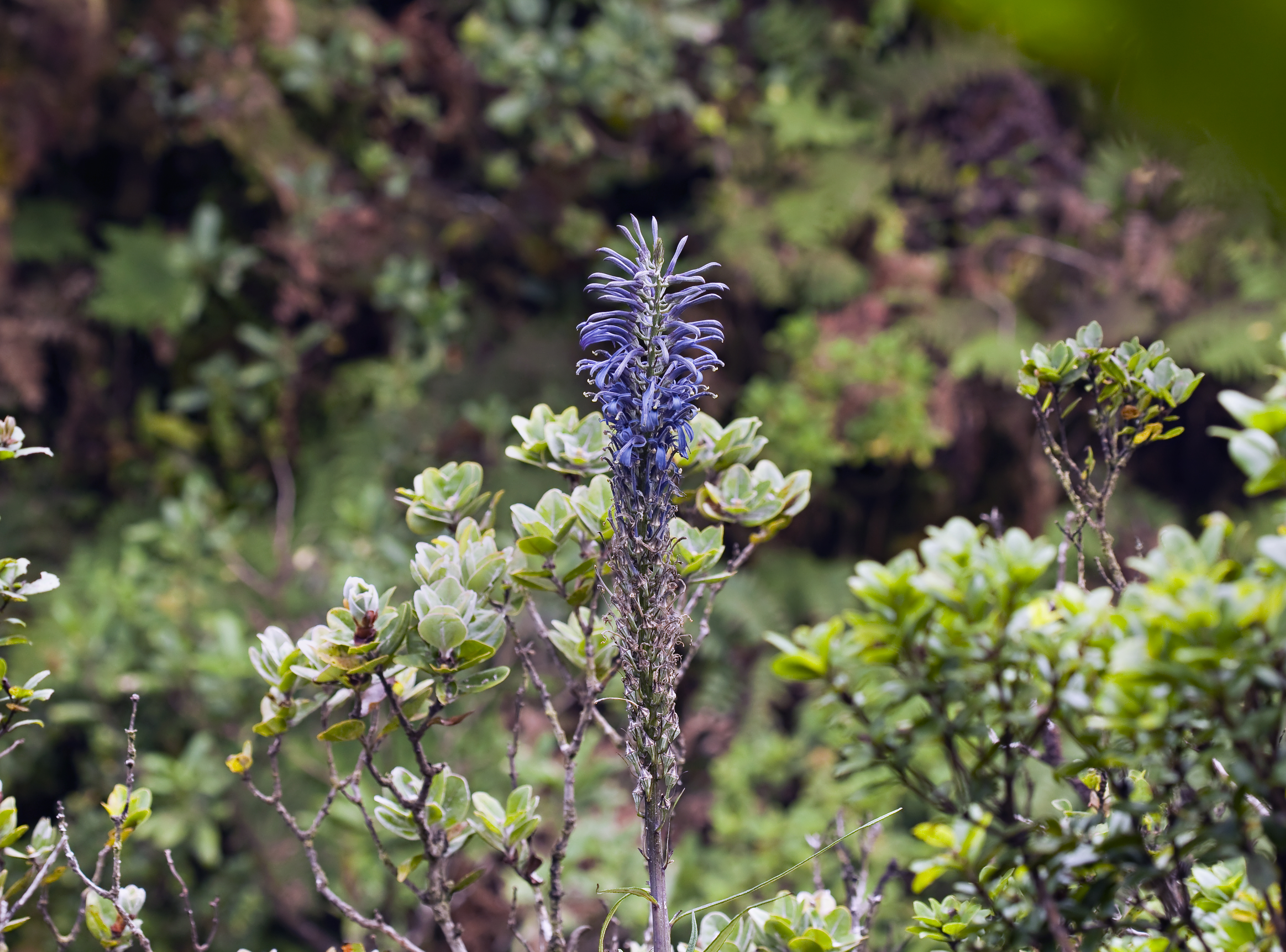

Scientific classification
- Kingdom: Plantae
- Clade: Tracheophytes
- Clade: Angiosperms
- Clade: Eudicots
- Clade: Asterids
- Order: Asterales
- Family: Campanulaceae
- Genus: Lobelia
- Species: L. hypoleuca

Binomial name
- Lobelia hypoleuca Hillebr.

Synonyms
- Lobelia hypoleuca var. heterocarpa E.Wimm.; Lobelia hypoleuca f. macrophyta Rock; Lobelia hypoleuca var. rockii H.St.John & Hosaka; Neowimmeria heterocarpa (E.Wimm.) I.Deg. & O.Deg.; Neowimmeria hypoleuca (Hillebr.) O. Deg. & I. Deg.; Neowimmeria hypoleuca var. macrophyta (Rock) I.Deg. & O.Deg.; Neowimmeria rockii (H.St.John & Hosaka) I.Deg. & O.Deg.

= Lobelia hypoleuca =

Species of flowering plant

Lobelia hypoleuca, common names kuhiʻaikamoʻowahie, 'ōpelu, liua, or mo'owahie, is one of several species in the genus Lobelia endemic to Hawaii though cultivated elsewhere. It is found in nature on the islands of Kauaʻi, Oʻahu, Molokaʻi, Lānaʻi, Maui and Hawaiʻi.

Lobelia hypoleuca is a shrub that can attain a height of 3.3 m (11 feet). Stems are woody, whitish, with a rough texture. Leaves are narrowly lanceolate with teeth along the margins, up to 60 cm (2 feet) long, green and shiny above, but appearing white on the underside due to a dense covering of fine wooly hairs (hence the epithet "hypoleuca" meaning "white below"). The plant produces 3-7 tall flowering stalks, each up to 40 cm (16 inches)long. Flowers are blue.
