= Festuca aloha =

Conservation status
- Critically Endangered (IUCN 3.1)

Scientific classification
- Kingdom: Plantae
- Clade: Tracheophytes
- Clade: Angiosperms
- Clade: Monocots
- Clade: Commelinids
- Order: Poales
- Family: Poaceae
- Subfamily: Pooideae
- Genus: Festuca
- Species: F. aloha

Binomial name
- Festuca aloha Catalán, Soreng, & P.M.Peterson

Species of plant

Festuca aloha, also known as the aloha fescue, is a species of grass in the genus Festuca. This species is accepted and it appears to be endemic to Hawaii. This species seems to be critically endangered. Two forms of this species have been described.

- Festuca aloha f. aloha
- Festuca aloha f. molokaiensis
