= Molokaʻi cauliflower coral =

Scientific classification
- Kingdom: Animalia
- Phylum: Cnidaria
- Subphylum: Anthozoa
- Class: Hexacorallia
- Order: Scleractinia
- Family: Pocilloporidae
- Genus: Pocillopora
- Species: P. molokensis

Binomial name
- Pocillopora molokensis Vaughan, 1907

Species of cnidarian

Pocillopora molokensis, also called Molokai cauliflower coral, is a coral in the family Pocilloporidae endemic to Hawai'i.
