= Carex montis-eeka =

Scientific classification
- Kingdom: Plantae
- Clade: Tracheophytes
- Clade: Angiosperms
- Clade: Monocots
- Clade: Commelinids
- Order: Poales
- Family: Cyperaceae
- Genus: Carex
- Species: C. montis-eeka

Binomial name
- Carex montis-eeka Hillebr.

Synonyms
- Carex montis-eeka var. filifolia Skottsb.; Carex montis-eeka var. viridens Kük.

Species of grass-like plant

Carex montis-eeka, the Molokai sedge, is a species of flowering plant in the family Cyperaceae, native to Hawaii. There it is found in bogs.
