= Pritchardia woodfordiana =

Conservation status
- Data Deficient (IUCN 2.3)

Scientific classification
- Kingdom: Plantae
- Clade: Tracheophytes
- Clade: Angiosperms
- Clade: Monocots
- Clade: Commelinids
- Order: Arecales
- Family: Arecaceae
- Tribe: Trachycarpeae
- Genus: Pritchardia
- Species: P. woodfordiana

Binomial name
- Pritchardia woodfordiana ined.

Species of palm

Pritchardia woodfordiana is a species of flowering plant in the family Arecaceae. It is found only in Solomon Islands. It may be a form of Pritchardia pacifica.
