= Steve Perlman =

Steve Perlman may refer to:

- Steve Perlman (entrepreneur)
- Steve Perlman (botanist)

== See also ==
- Steve Pearlman, Canadian television producer and director
