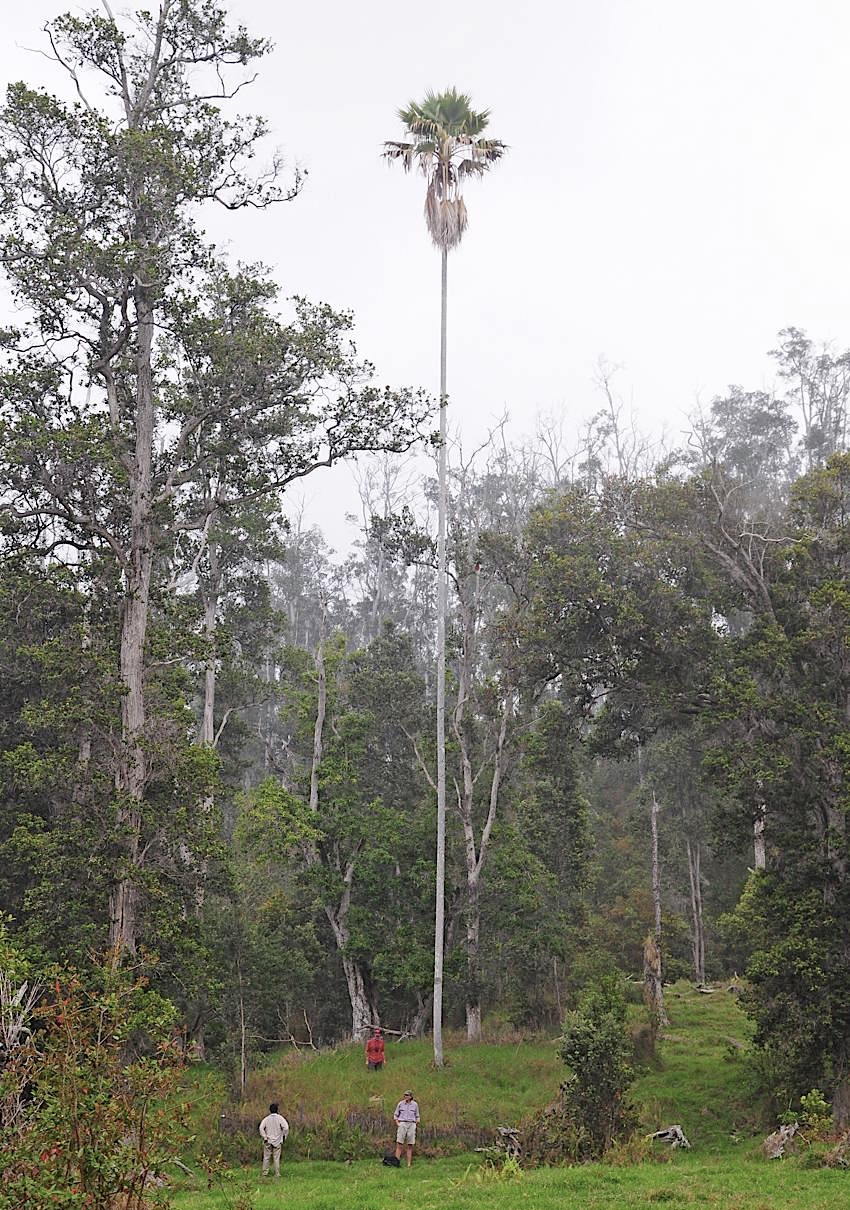

Conservation status
- Critically Endangered (IUCN 2.3)

Scientific classification
- Kingdom: Plantae
- Clade: Tracheophytes
- Clade: Angiosperms
- Clade: Monocots
- Clade: Commelinids
- Order: Arecales
- Family: Arecaceae
- Genus: Pritchardia
- Species: P. schattaueri

Binomial name
- Pritchardia schattaueri Hodel

= Pritchardia schattaueri =

Species of palm

Pritchardia schattaueri, the lands of papa pritchardia or Schattauer's loulu, is a species of palm tree in the genus Pritchardia that is endemic to mixed mesic forests on the southwestern part of island of Hawaiʻi, near Kona. It is officially listed as a Critically endangered species.

== Description ==
This species reaches an incredible height of 130 feet (40 m), with a smooth, grayish trunk up to 12 inches (0.30 m) in diameter. The large, spherical crown typically contains up to 30 ascending, spreading to drooping leaves, with the 5 foot (1.5 m) long and 6 foot (1.8 m) wide slightly wavy blades held on petioles 6 feet (1.8 m) or more in length which are abundantly covered along both edges at the base in medium tan fibers. The leaves, glossy green above and below, are divided to 2/5 into many pendulous-tipped segments, with the abaxial surface incompletely covered with scattered fuzz. The inflorescences are composed of 1-4 panicles, shorter than or equalling the petioles in length. The panicles are branched to 2 orders, with glabrous rachillae. The flowers are followed by large, shiny, black, mostly spherical fruits nearly 2 inches (5.1 cm) long and 1.6–1.5 inches (4.1–3.8 cm) wide when mature. It grows at elevations of 2,000–2,600 feet (610–790 m), where it receives 2,000 millimetres (79 in) of rainfall per year.

== Distribution ==
Known only from twelve individuals, P. schattaueri currently occurs in moist, partially cleared, disturbed, tall, mixed ōhiʻa forest on gently sloping, rocky terrain from 2,000–2,600 feet (610–790 m) feet elevation in South Kona on the island of Hawaiʻi, where it receives 2,000 millimetres (79 in) of rainfall per year. Ten of the twelve individuals occur within 1,000 feet of each other among tall ōhiʻa trees in a cattle ranch, while the remaining two plants are a mile or two away, one in a macadamia nut orchard and the other in weedy, forest remnants.

== History ==
Pritchardia schattaueri was formally named and described by Donald Hodel in 1985, basing it on a collection that the late H. E. Moore Jr. of the Bailey Hortorum of Cornell University had made in 1980. The name honors the late George Schattauer, manager of Ho'omau ranch (the ranch of the late Jimmy Stewart), who came across these palms in 1960 while clearing land for pasture and macadamia nuts. Schattauer, who had a fondness for Hawaiian plants and an interest in preserving the flora and fauna of Hawaiʻi, recognized the significance of his discovery and left the palms standing. In 1969 and 1970, he sent fruits to Paul Wessich of Honolulu Botanical Gardens, who planted and grew them in the garden in Honolulu. The population is officially designated as an Exceptional Tree of Hawaiʻi.

== Cultivation and uses ==
Native Hawaiians valued the fruits of Pritchardia as a food source. The immature fruits, called hāwane or wāhane, were gathered and the endosperm was eaten (tasting like coconut meat). Leaves were also collected to use for thatching roofs, as well as for making fans, umbrellas, hats, and baskets. The trunks were also used for making spears and as material for construction.

Hawaiian Pritchardia are especially popular among growers and collectors in subtropical areas or in regions with a Mediterranean climate, such as southern California, Southern Europe, and southern Australia, because they are more tolerant of cooler temperatures than their South Pacific counterparts, Pritchardia pacifica and Pritchardia thurstonii.

== Conservation ==
Pritchardia schattaueri is officially listed as a Critically endangered species. There are 12 individuals remaining in the wild, all on private land. Threats include urbanization, severe habitat degradation, rats, pigs, cattle and weeds. No seedling recruitment and relatively small overall numbers prohibit regeneration. Its narrow, restricted range increases susceptibility to a single disruptive event, such as a hurricane or volcanic activity, and to potential damage from introduced weeds, animals and disease. Although all palms are mature and produce regularly, their habitat is so altered that regeneration is non-existent. All twelve plants are tall and old and perhaps approaching the end of their natural lives. Some have a generally unthrifty appearance, with much-reduced, hemispherical crowns of leaves and minimal flower and fruit production.

In 2001, seed from all 12 Pritchardia schattaueri was collected by the Kona Palm Society. The Amy Greenwell Ethnobotanical Garden ensured their propagation. A partnership was formed between the United States Fish and Wildlife Service and The Nature Conservancy to reintroduce the endangered seedlings in significant numbers at the Conservancy's Kona Hema Preserve. The Kona Hema site was selected for its close proximity to the founder seed trees, and also because the entire 8,000-acre preserve was fenced and free of hooved animals, something that had never been done at this scale in the Kona landscape. The site provided ideal conditions for protecting an out-planted endangered species and ensuring its survival into the future.

Since the initial planting, many more seeds have been collected and planted. Because they came from a very small population, it was important to have as much genetic variability as possible, so the founder tree of each seedling was tracked and a GPS point recorded. Today there are over 600 Pritchardia schattaueri of various ages growing at Kona Hema Preserve, some more than 15 feet tall.

== Gallery ==
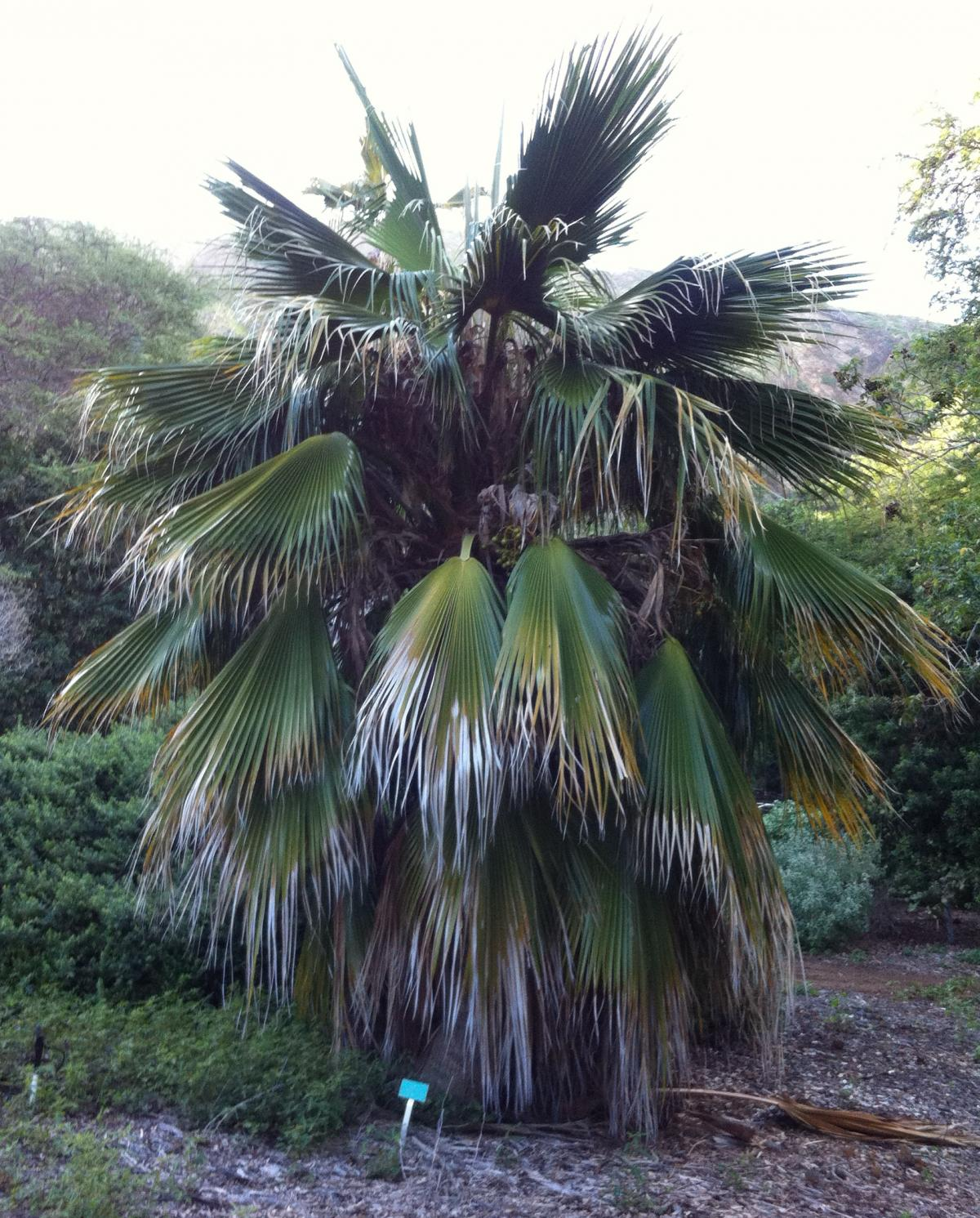

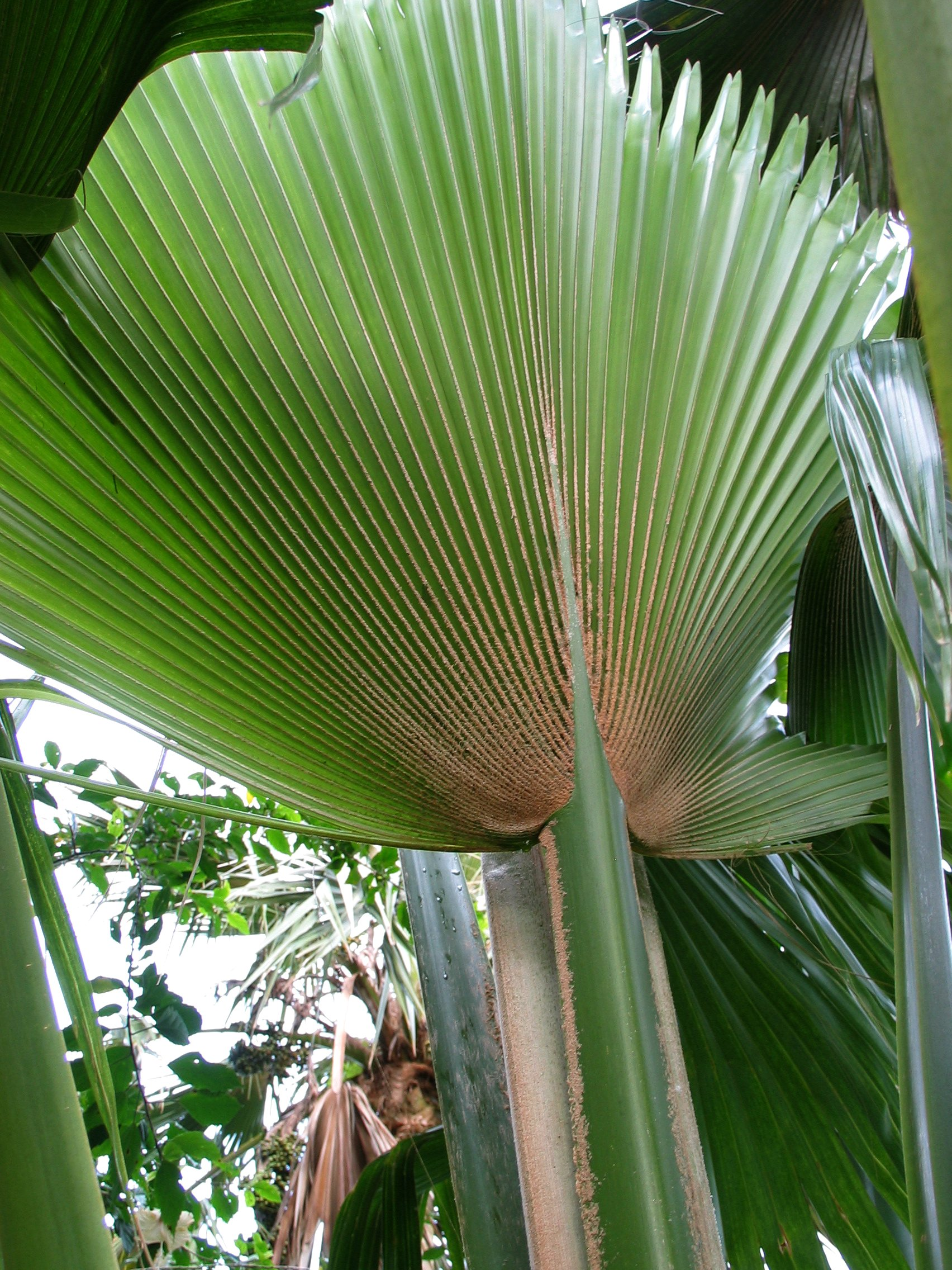

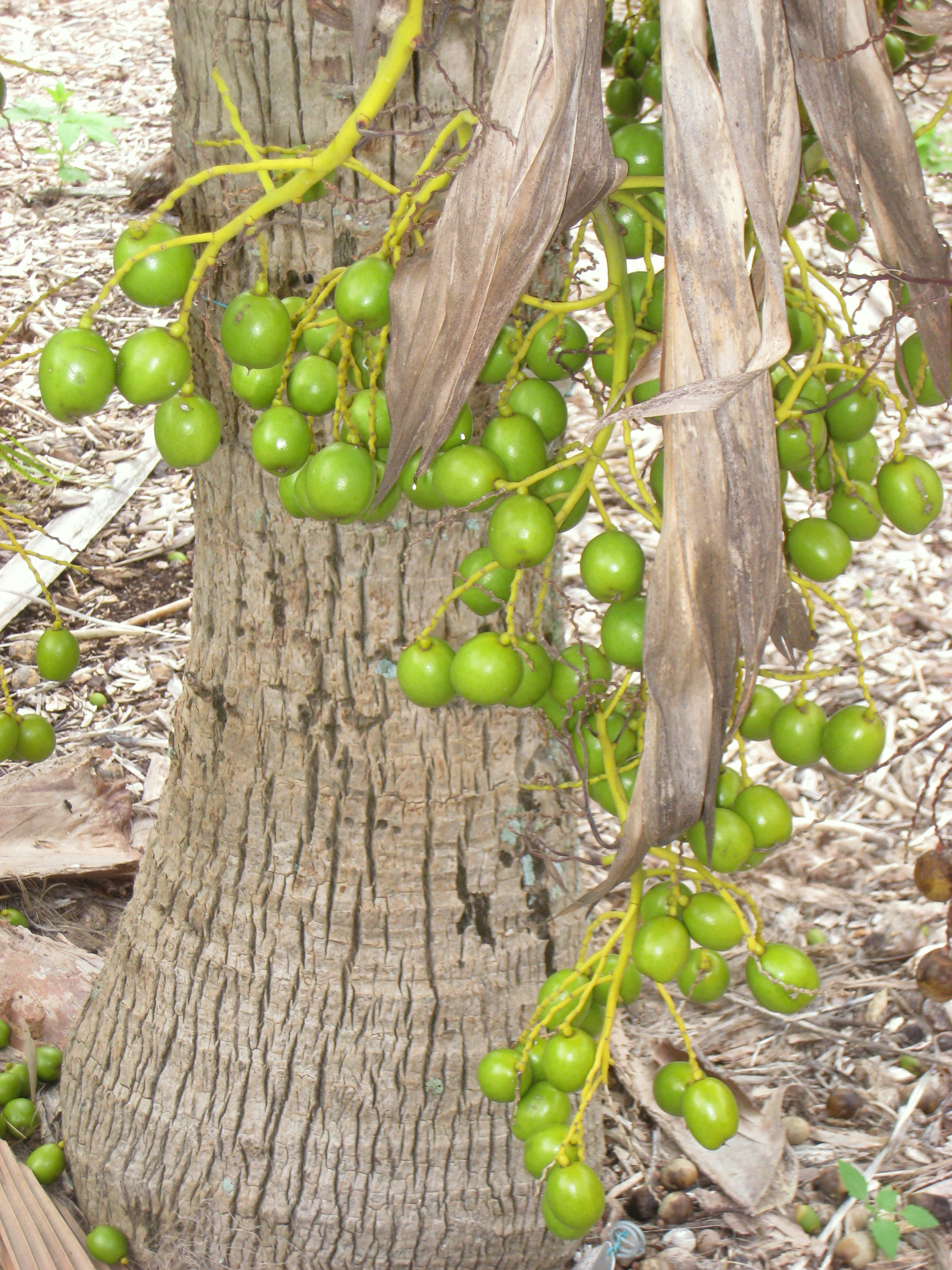

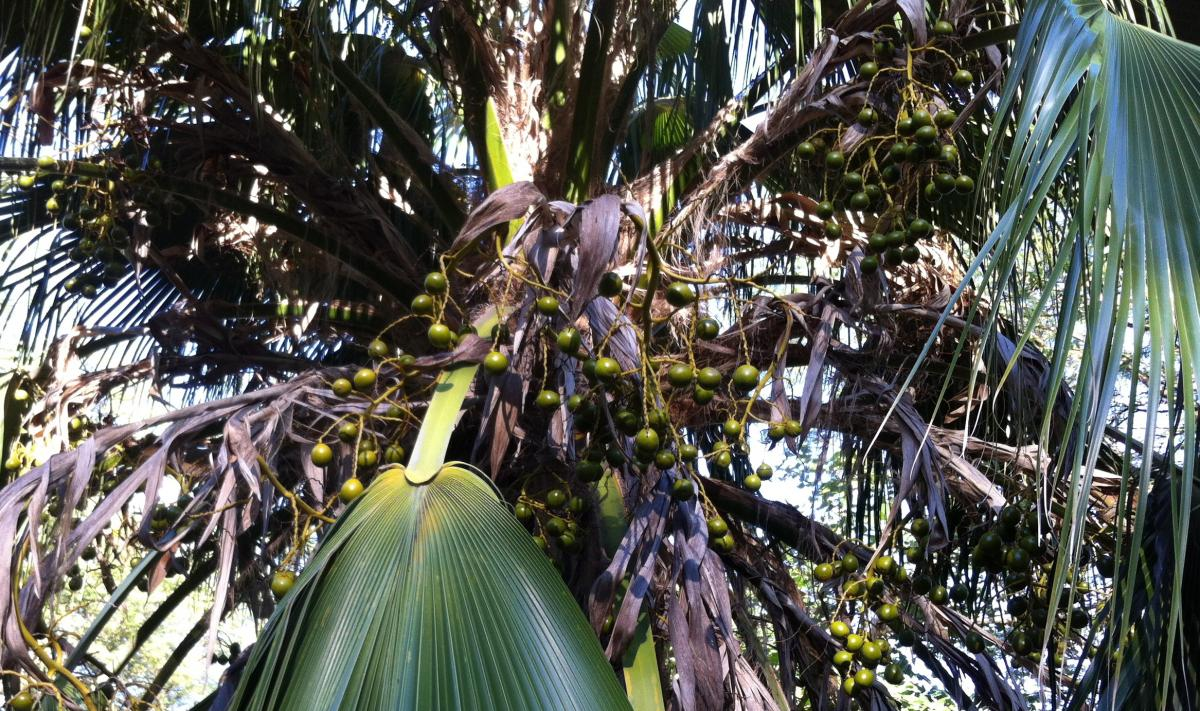
