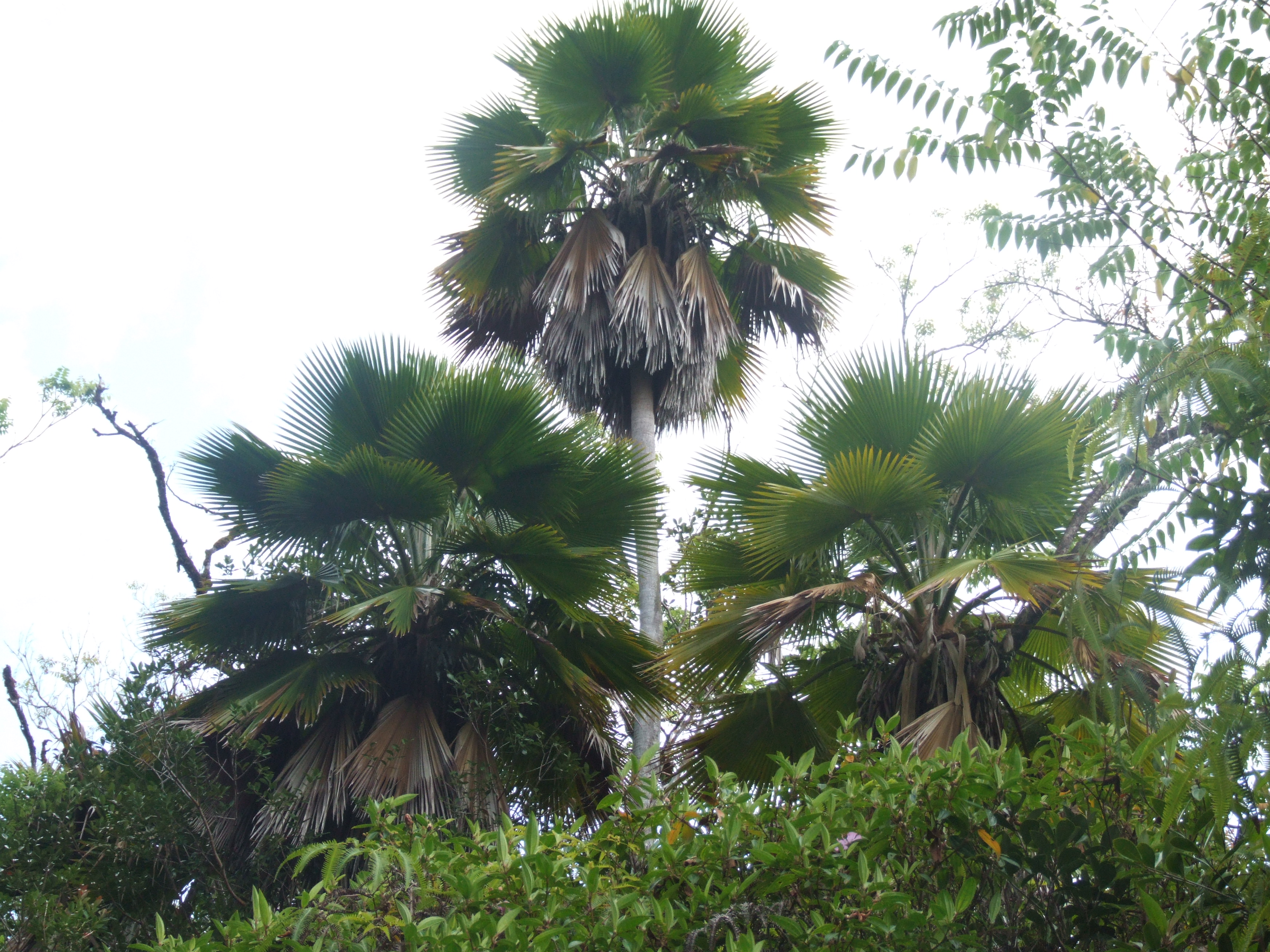

Conservation status
- Critically Imperiled (NatureServe)

Scientific classification
- Kingdom: Plantae
- Clade: Tracheophytes
- Clade: Angiosperms
- Clade: Monocots
- Clade: Commelinids
- Order: Arecales
- Family: Arecaceae
- Tribe: Trachycarpeae
- Genus: Pritchardia
- Species: P. beccariana

Binomial name
- Pritchardia beccariana Rock

= Pritchardia beccariana =

Species of palm

Pritchardia beccariana, the Kilauea pritchardia, or Beccari's loulu, is a species of palm tree in the genus Pritchardia that is endemic to wet forests on the eastern part of the island of Hawaiʻi, near Hilo.

== Description ==
This species reaches a height of 65 feet (20 m), with a smooth, grayish trunk between 8–10 inches (0.20–0.25 m) in diameter. The 25–30 leaves are 6 feet (1.8 m) wide and equally long, held on petioles 6 feet (1.8 m) in length which are moderately covered along both edges at the base in medium tan fibers. The large, flat and rounded leaves are divided 1/5-1/4 into many stiff-tipped segments, with the abaxial surface incompletely covered with scattered fuzz. The inflorescences are composed of 2-4 panicles, shorter than or equalling the petioles in length. The panicles are branched to 3 orders, with scruffy indumentum in flower and glabrous in fruit. The flowers are followed by large, black oval to spherical fruits about 1.5 inches (3.8 cm) long and 1.25–1.5 inches (3.2–3.8 cm) wide when mature. It grows at elevations of 1,000–4,200 feet (300–1,280 m) where it receives greater than 100 inches (2,500 mm) of rainfall per year. It was historically present at lower elevation, likely as low as sea level, but urbanization and farming have destroyed all of the forest at lower elevations. It is threatened by habitat loss, weed invasion, and prevention of seedling recruitment by rats and pigs.

== History ==
Joseph Rock found Pritchardia beccariana in December 1914 by Glenwood near Kīlauea at about 3,500 feet (1,100 m) elevation and formally named and described it in 1916, honoring his friend and coworker Odoardo Beccari. Rock informed Beccari that the palm "is a beautiful palm of fine symmetry... a very distinct species and very different from any other Pritchardia known to me. The leaves resemble more those of Pritchardia pacifica than any other Hawaiian species."

Rock later collected and sent more material of another Pritchardia to Beccari, this time from 4,200 feet elevation and very close to Kīlauea on land opposite the residence of Walter M. Giffard, who helped to collect the specimens. Because this Pritchardia from higher elevations differed from Pritchardia beccariana in its smaller habit and size of leaves, flower, fruit stalks and fruits, Rock urged Beccari to name and describe it as a new species. However, Beccari felt that the differences were probably due to the higher elevation where they grew. Thus, Beccari concluded that the differences were insufficient to erect a new species, although he did establish the variety giffardiana to honor Giffard and recognize its smaller stature.

== Cultivation and uses ==
Native Hawaiians valued the fruits of Pritchardia as a food source. The immature fruits, called hāwane or wāhane, were gathered and the endosperm was eaten (tasting like coconut meat). Leaves were also collected to use for thatching roofs, as well as for making fans, umbrellas, hats, and baskets. The trunks were also used for making spears and as material for construction.

Pritchardia beccariana is also grown with some level of success as a landscape palm in tropical and subtropical areas. Hawaiian Pritchardia are especially popular among growers and collectors in subtropical areas or in regions with a Mediterranean climate, such as southern California, Southern Europe, and southern Australia, because they are more tolerant of cooler temperatures than their South Pacific counterparts. Indeed, Pritchardia beccariana bears a striking resemblance to the handsome and acclaimed Fiji fan palm and even another south Pacific species, Thurston's fan palm.

== Gallery ==
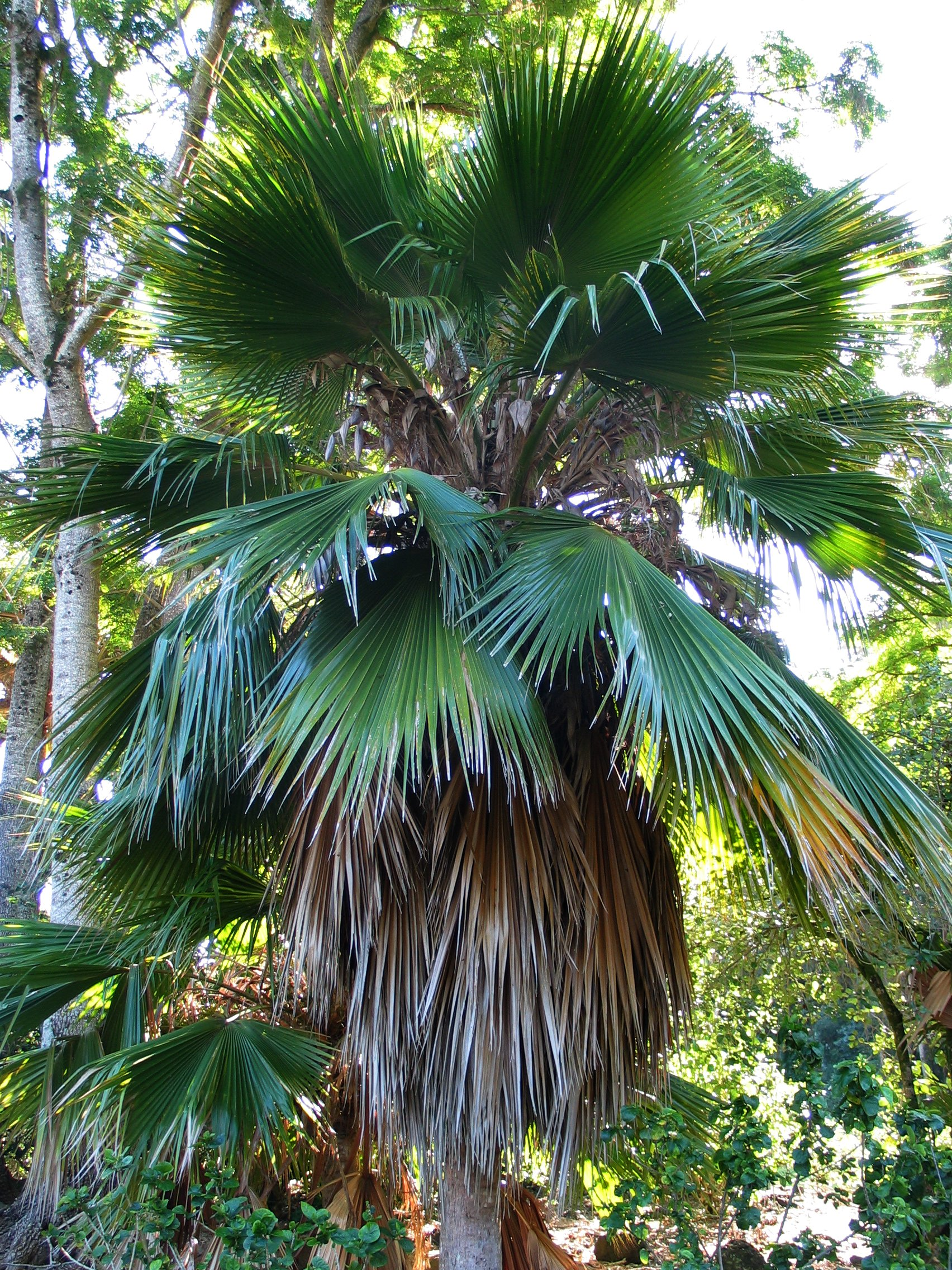

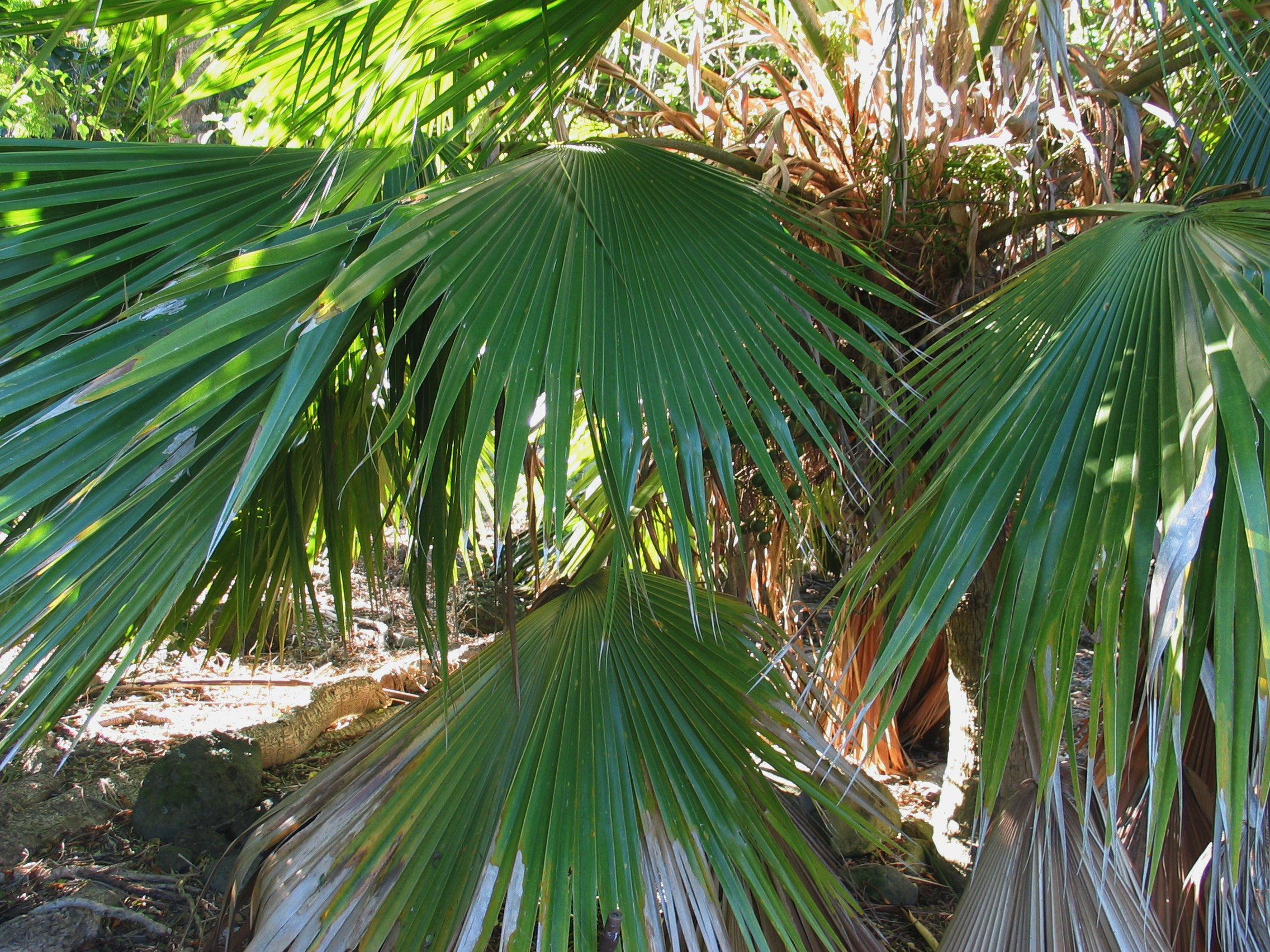

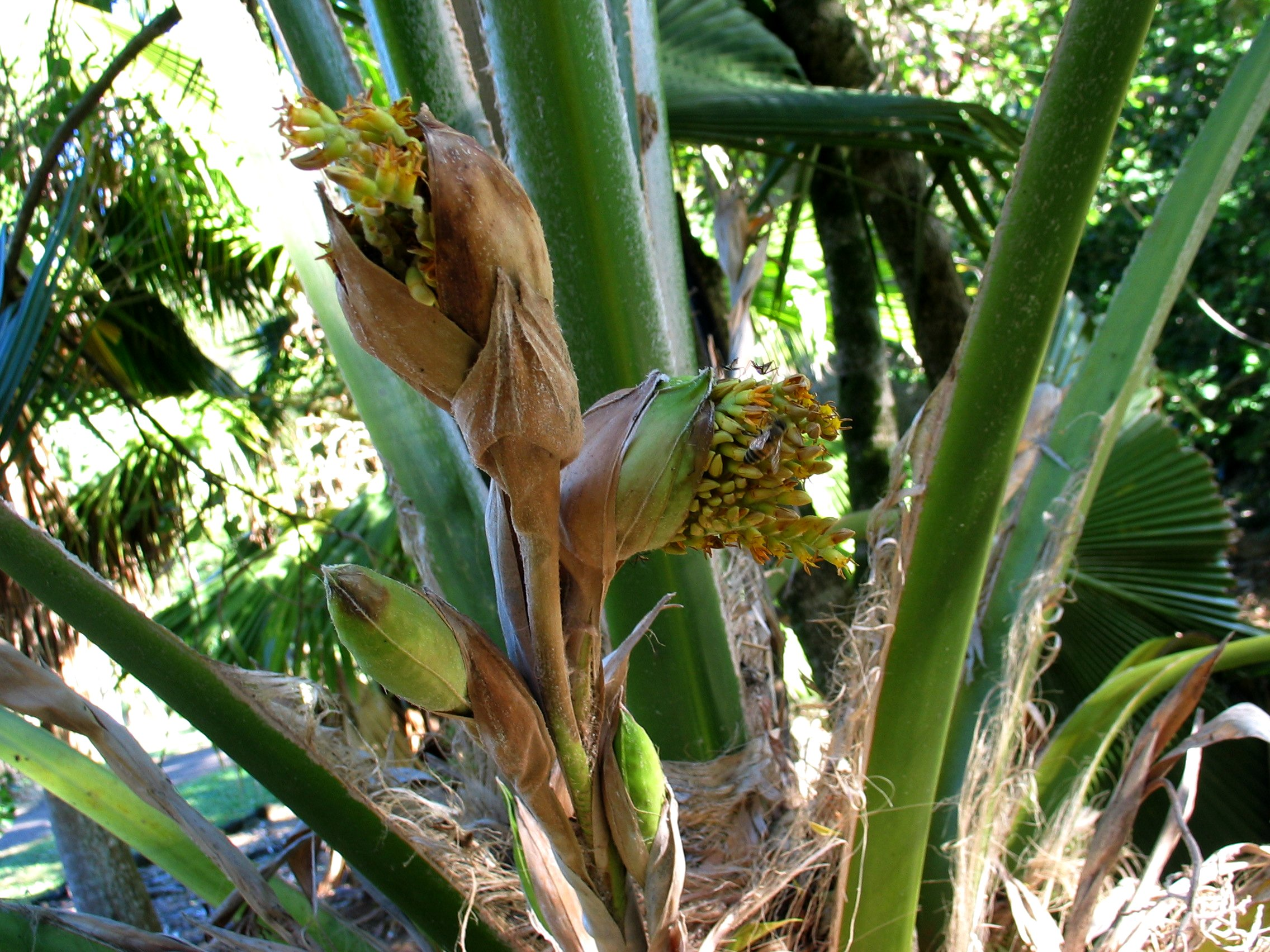

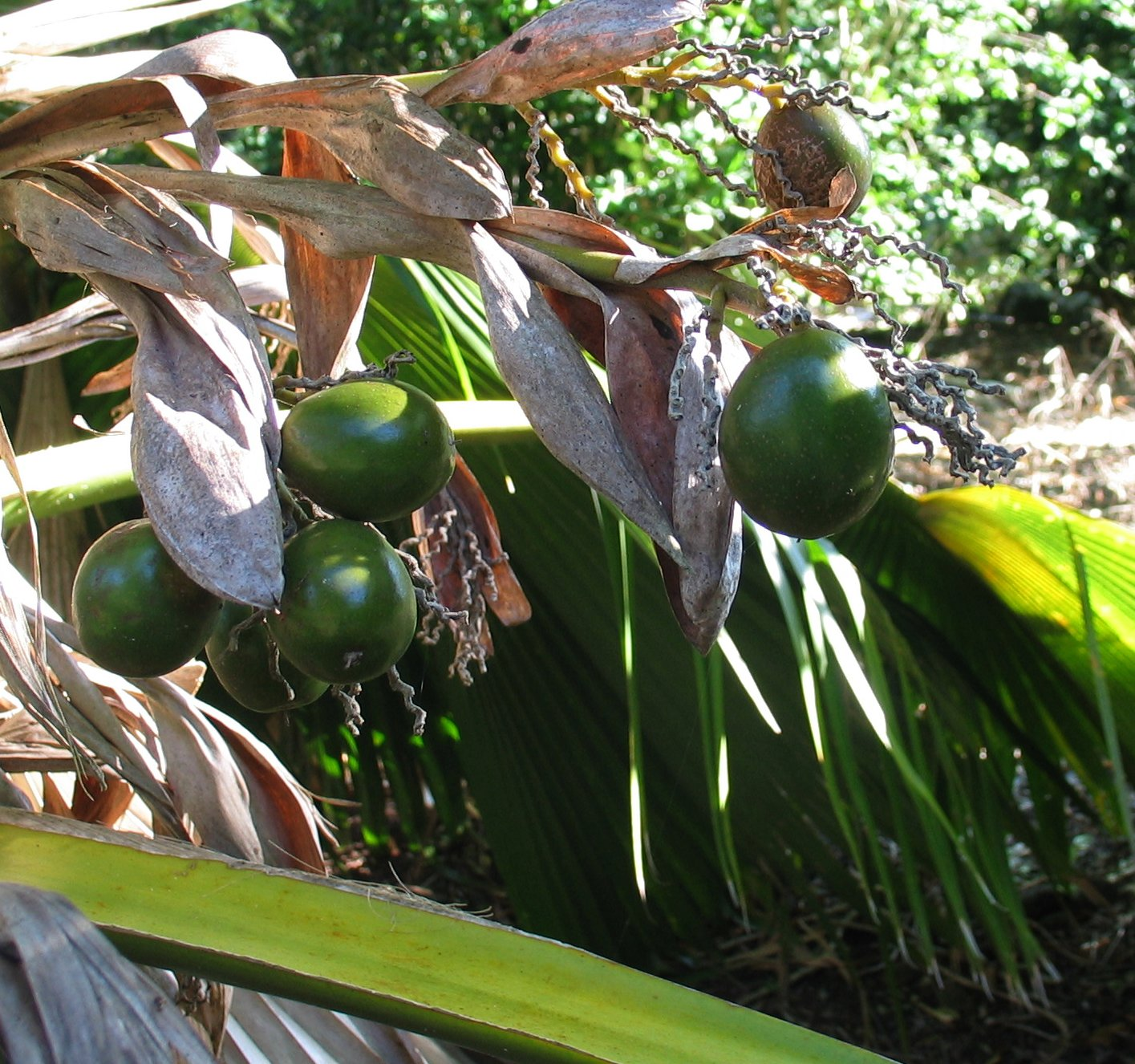
