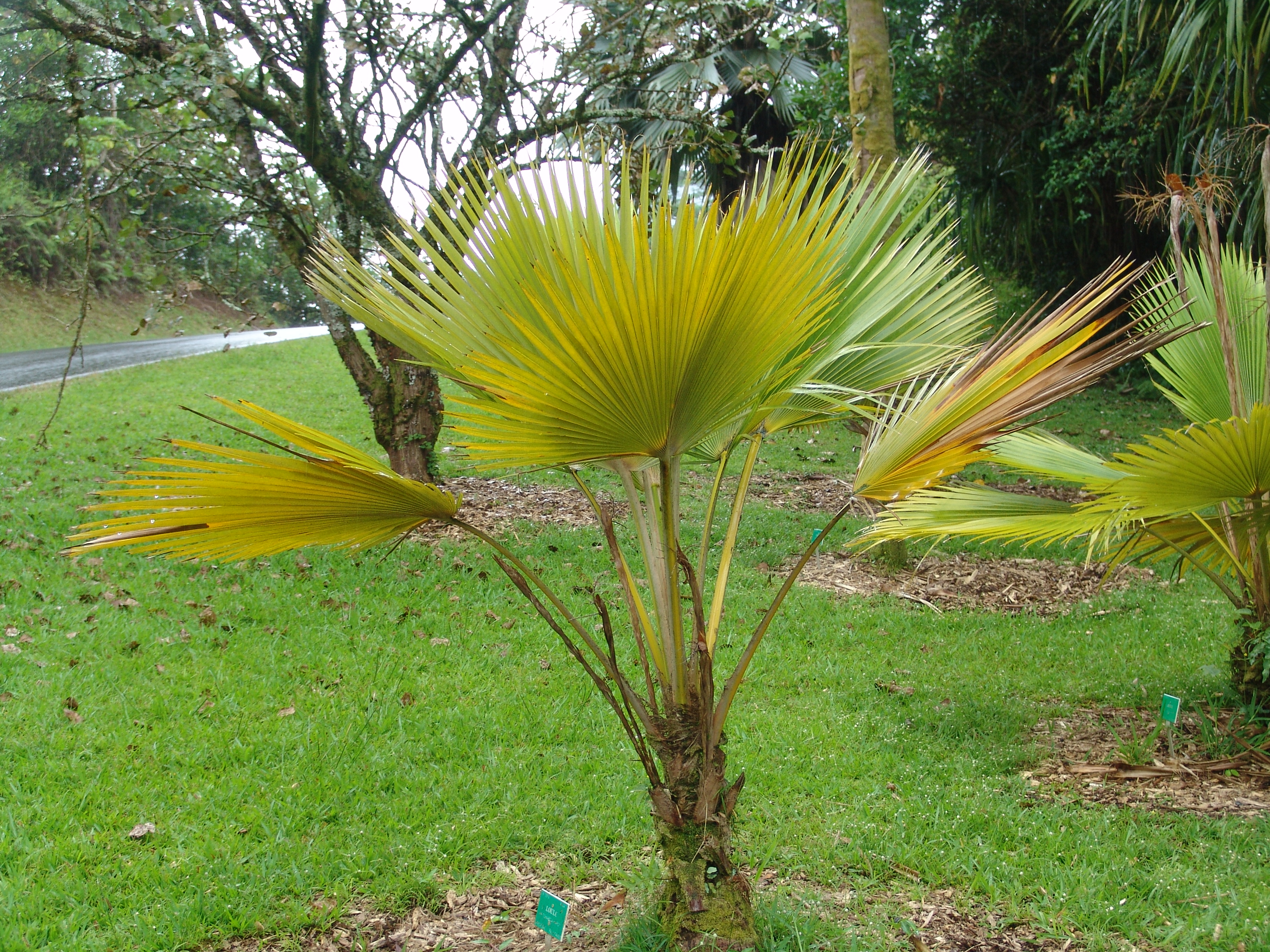

Conservation status
- Critically Endangered (IUCN 3.1)

Scientific classification
- Kingdom: Plantae
- Clade: Tracheophytes
- Clade: Angiosperms
- Clade: Monocots
- Clade: Commelinids
- Order: Arecales
- Family: Arecaceae
- Tribe: Trachycarpeae
- Genus: Pritchardia
- Species: P. hardyi

Binomial name
- Pritchardia hardyi Rock

= Pritchardia hardyi =

Makaleha pritchardia

Species of palm

Pritchardia hardy, the Makaleha pritchardia, is a species of palm tree that is endemic to moist forests on the island of Kauaʻi at elevations below 2,000 feet (610 m). The trunk of this fast-growing species reaches a height of 80 feet (24 m), with a diameter of 1 foot (0.30 m). Its leaves are 3 feet (0.91 m) in length. In 1998 only 30 individuals remained in the wild along a single trail on Kauai. This is a federally listed endangered species of the United States.

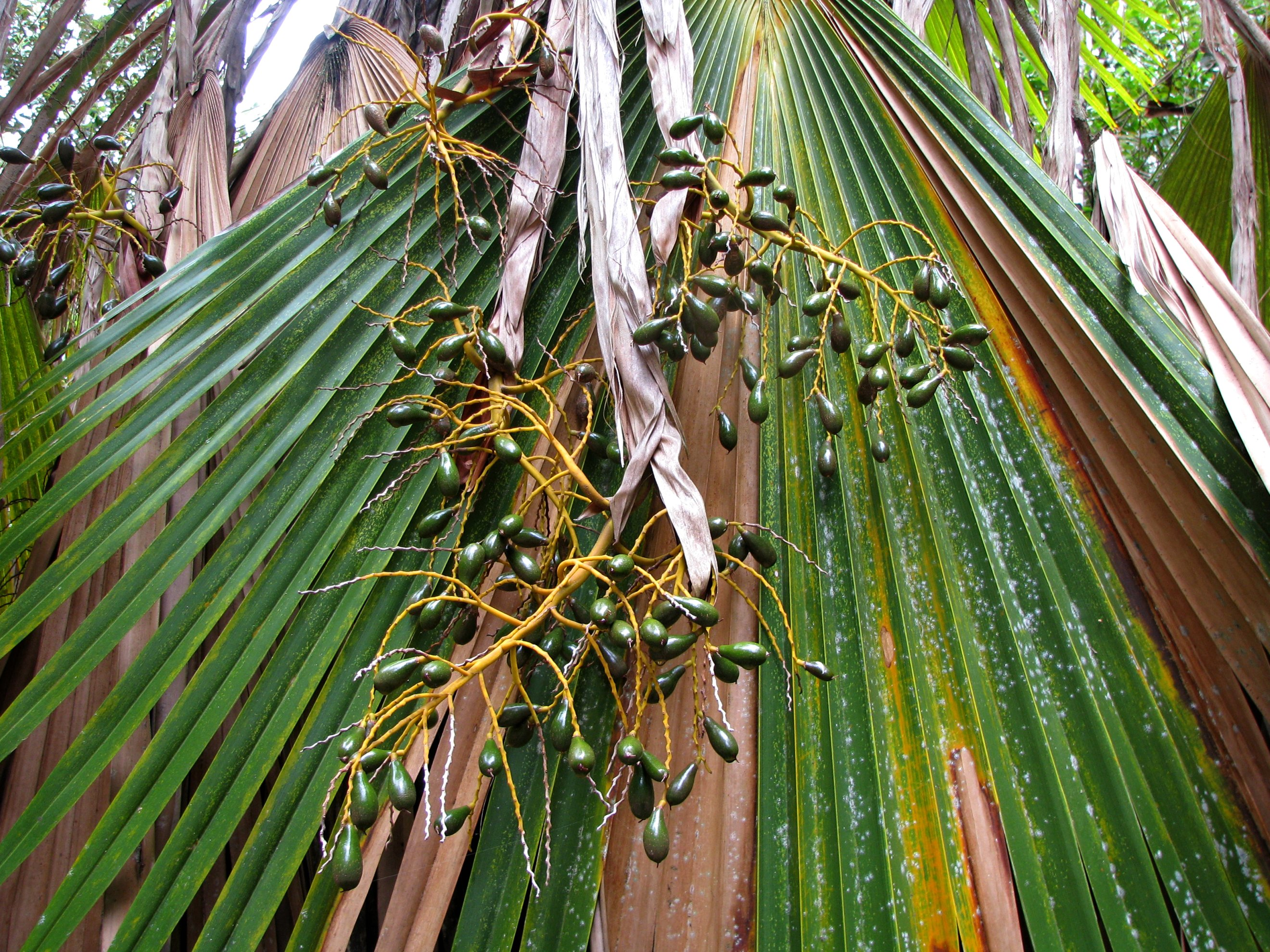
Unripe fruit
