= Pritchardia perlmanii =

Waiʻoli Valley pritchardia

Conservation status
- Critically Endangered (IUCN 3.1)

Scientific classification
- Kingdom: Plantae
- Clade: Tracheophytes
- Clade: Angiosperms
- Clade: Monocots
- Clade: Commelinids
- Order: Arecales
- Family: Arecaceae
- Tribe: Trachycarpeae
- Genus: Pritchardia
- Species: P. perlmanii

Binomial name
- Pritchardia perlmanii Gemmill

Species of palm

Pritchardia perlmanii, the Waiʻoli Valley pritchardia, is a species of palm tree that is endemic to the island of Kauaʻi in Hawaii, United States. It inhabits lowland mesic forests in the Waiʻoli Valley at an elevation of 420–850 m (1,380–2,790 ft). P. perlmanii reaches a height of 10 m (33 ft) and a trunk diameter of 30 cm (12 in).

== Etymology ==
The name of the plant honors two individuals; Pritchardia is dedicated to William Thomas Pritchard (1829–1907), a British official stationed in Fiji in the 19th century (later the British consul in Fiji), an adventurer, and author of Polynesian Reminiscences in 1866. The specific epithet perlmanii honors Steven Perlman, a botanist with the National Tropical Botanical Garden who was first to notice the unique features of this species of palm.
