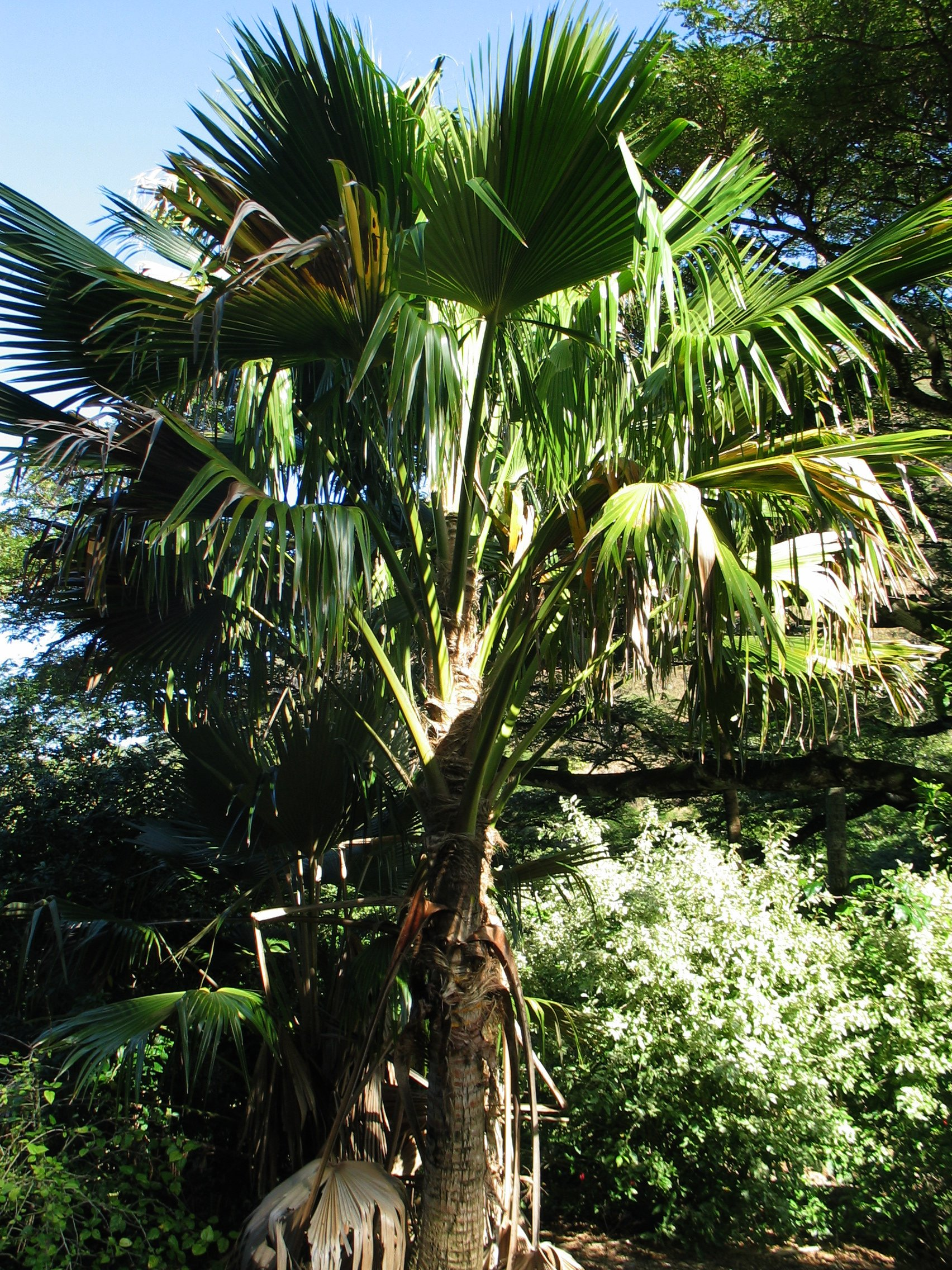

Conservation status
- Critically Endangered (IUCN 3.1)

Scientific classification
- Kingdom: Plantae
- Clade: Tracheophytes
- Clade: Angiosperms
- Clade: Monocots
- Clade: Commelinids
- Order: Arecales
- Family: Arecaceae
- Tribe: Trachycarpeae
- Genus: Pritchardia
- Species: P. waialealeana

Binomial name
- Pritchardia waialealeana R.W.Read

= Pritchardia waialealeana =

Species of palm

Pritchardia waialealeana, the poleline pritchardia, is a species of palm tree that is endemic to the island of Kauaʻi in Hawaii, United States. It inhabits wet forests on the slopes of Mount Waiʻaleʻale at elevations of 500–700 m (1,600–2,300 ft). P. waialealeana, is a large palm, reaching a height of more than 20 m (66 ft).
