= Pritchardia lanaiensis =

Conservation status
- Endangered (IUCN 2.3)

Scientific classification
- Kingdom: Plantae
- Clade: Tracheophytes
- Clade: Angiosperms
- Clade: Monocots
- Clade: Commelinids
- Order: Arecales
- Family: Arecaceae
- Tribe: Trachycarpeae
- Genus: Pritchardia
- Species: P. lanaiensis

Binomial name
- Pritchardia lanaiensis Becc. & Rock

Synonyms
- Pritchardia elliptica Rock & Caum

Species of palm

Pritchardia lanaiensis, the Lānaʻi pritchardia, is a species of fan palm that is endemic to Hawaii in the United States. It can only be found on the island of Lānaʻi.
