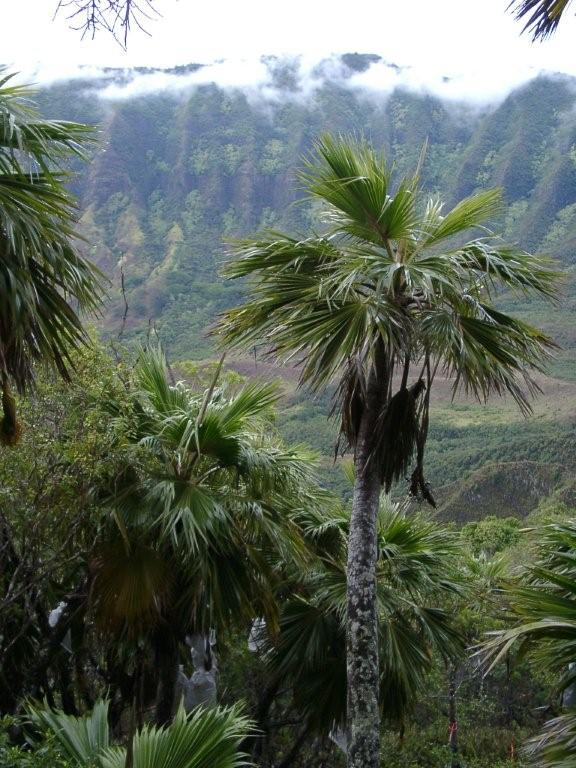

Conservation status
- Critically Endangered (IUCN 3.1)

- Endangered (ESA)

Scientific classification
- Kingdom: Plantae
- Clade: Tracheophytes
- Clade: Angiosperms
- Clade: Monocots
- Clade: Commelinids
- Order: Arecales
- Family: Arecaceae
- Genus: Pritchardia
- Species: P. kaalae

Binomial name
- Pritchardia kaalae Rock

= Pritchardia kaalae =

Species of palm

Pritchardia kaalae, also known as Waianae Range pritchardia or loulu palm, is a species of palm tree that is endemic to the western part of the island of Oʻahu in Hawaiʻi. It grows near springs in the dry forests on the Waiʻanae Range at elevations up to 2,500 feet (760 m). This slow growing species reaches a height of 25 feet (7.6 m), with a trunk diameter of 1 foot (0.30 m). In 1998 there were fewer than 130 individuals remaining in the wild. This has been a federally listed endangered species of the United States since 1996.

== Etymology ==
The scientific name Pritchardia kaalae honors William Thomas Pritchard (1829–1907), a 19th-century British consul in Fiji, as well as the botanist Herman Wendland who described it. The Hawaiian name loulu translates to "umbrella," a reference to the plant's umbrella-like appearance, with its large, fan-shaped leaves that were historically used for protection from the sun or rain.

== Description ==
Hawaiʻi is home to twenty-four species of loulu palms. These trees are unarmed (lacking thorns or spines) and feature fan-shaped or palmate leaves, which are divided into three parts: the leaf base, leaf stalk, and leaf blade. The flowers of the loulu palm are typically small (less than one-third of an inch), bright yellow, and densely arranged. When open, the flowers release a fragrant scent and produce moderate to abundant nectar, attracting pollinators. The fruits of the loulu are variable in size and shape, usually globose to ellipsoid.

== Cultural Significance ==
For early Hawaiians, the loulu palm was an important resource. Its leaves were used in thatching, as well as in the plaiting of traditional items such as papale (hats) and fans. The green, sub-mature seeds of the loulu, known as hawane or wahane, were considered a delicacy in Hawaiian cuisine.

== Distribution and Habitat ==
Tree molds of loulu palms found on the Kona coast suggest that these palms were present since the early period of Polynesian settlement in Hawaiʻi. They were an important part of the precontact vegetation of the area, contributing to the local ecosystem and culture.

== Conservation efforts ==
The legal status of this species as federally endangered. Conservation efforts around these plants include limiting visitation, and collecting seeds to be placed in ex situ botanic gardens.
