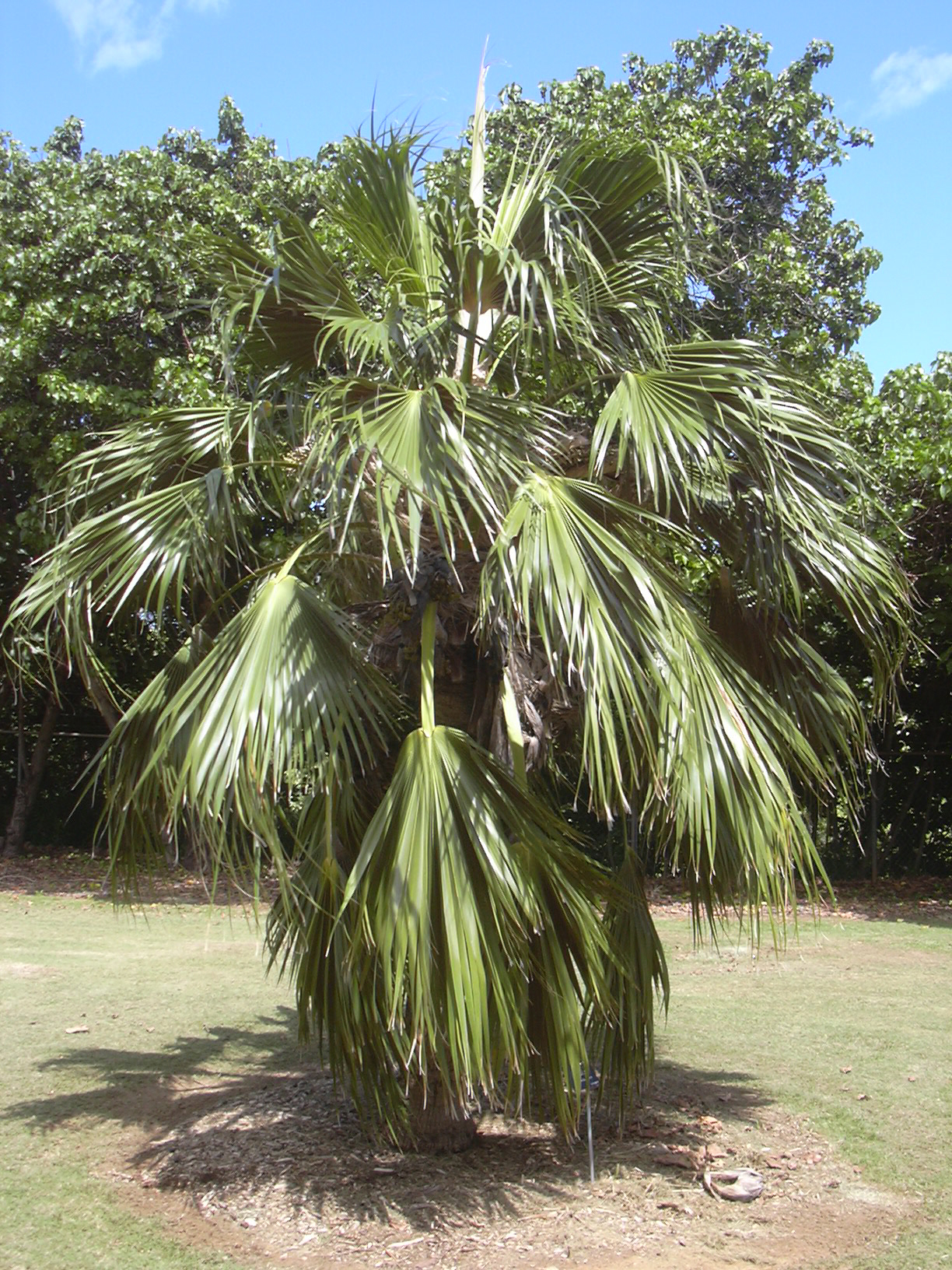
- Pritchardia munroi at the Maui Nui Botanical Gardens

Conservation status
- Critically Endangered (IUCN 2.3)

Scientific classification
- Kingdom: Plantae
- Clade: Embryophytes
- Clade: Tracheophytes
- Clade: Spermatophytes
- Clade: Angiosperms
- Clade: Monocots
- Clade: Commelinids
- Order: Arecales
- Family: Arecaceae
- Tribe: Trachycarpeae
- Genus: Pritchardia
- Species: P. munroi

Binomial name
- Pritchardia munroi Rock, 1920

= Pritchardia munroi =

Species of palm

Pritchardia munroi, the Kamalo pritchardia, is a species of fan palm that is endemic to Hawaii in the United States. It is found in dry forests on the eastern (leeward) side of the island of Molokaʻi. The specific epithet, refers to James Monro, the manager of the Molokai Ranch at the time of its discovery (1920). Only two individuals exist in the wild, and both are at an elevation of 610 m (2,000 ft). It reaches a height of 4–5 m (13–16 ft) and a trunk diameter of 20 cm (7.9 in).

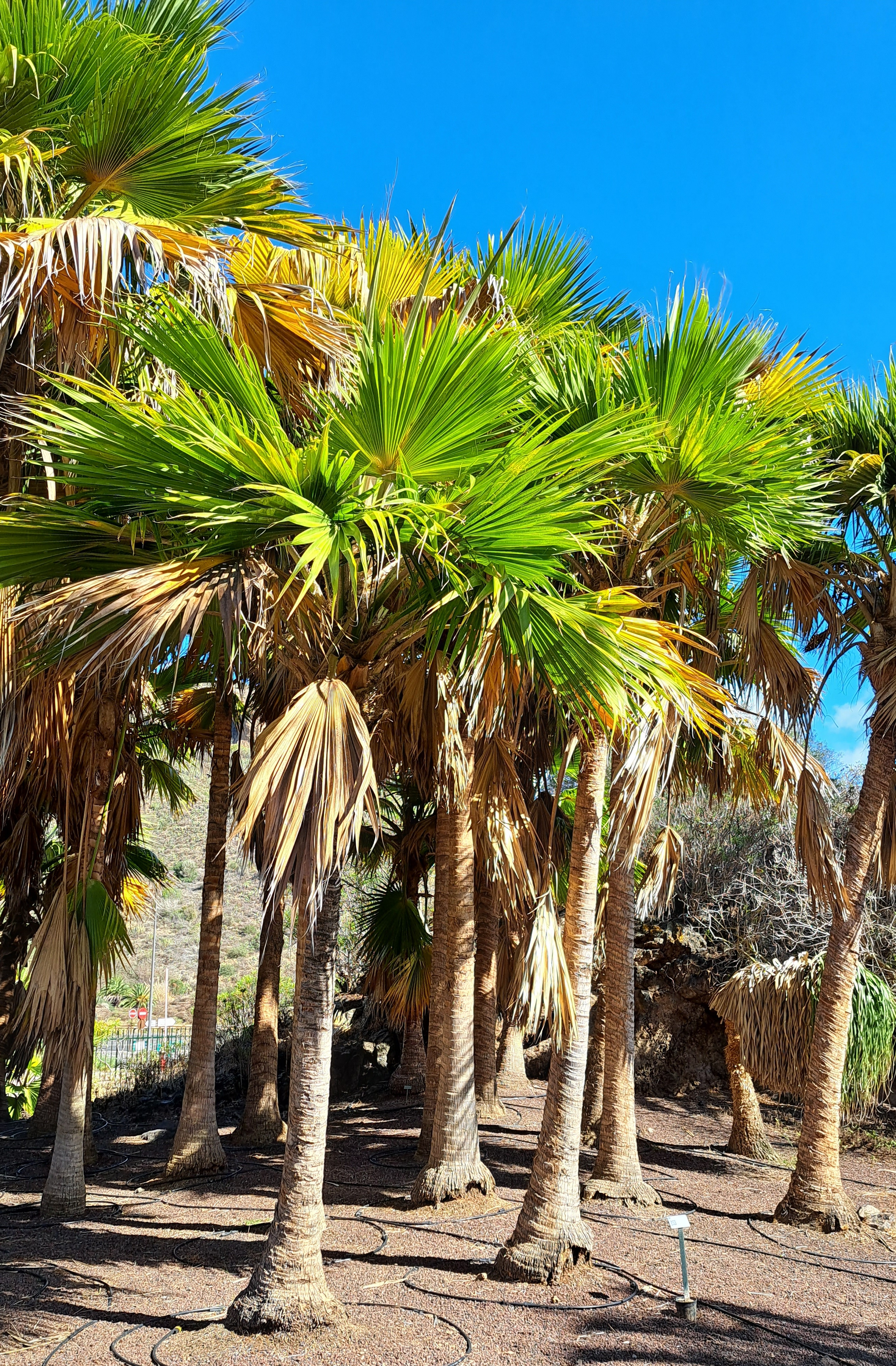
A group of Pritchardia munroi at the botanical garden Jardin Canario on the island Gran Canaria.
