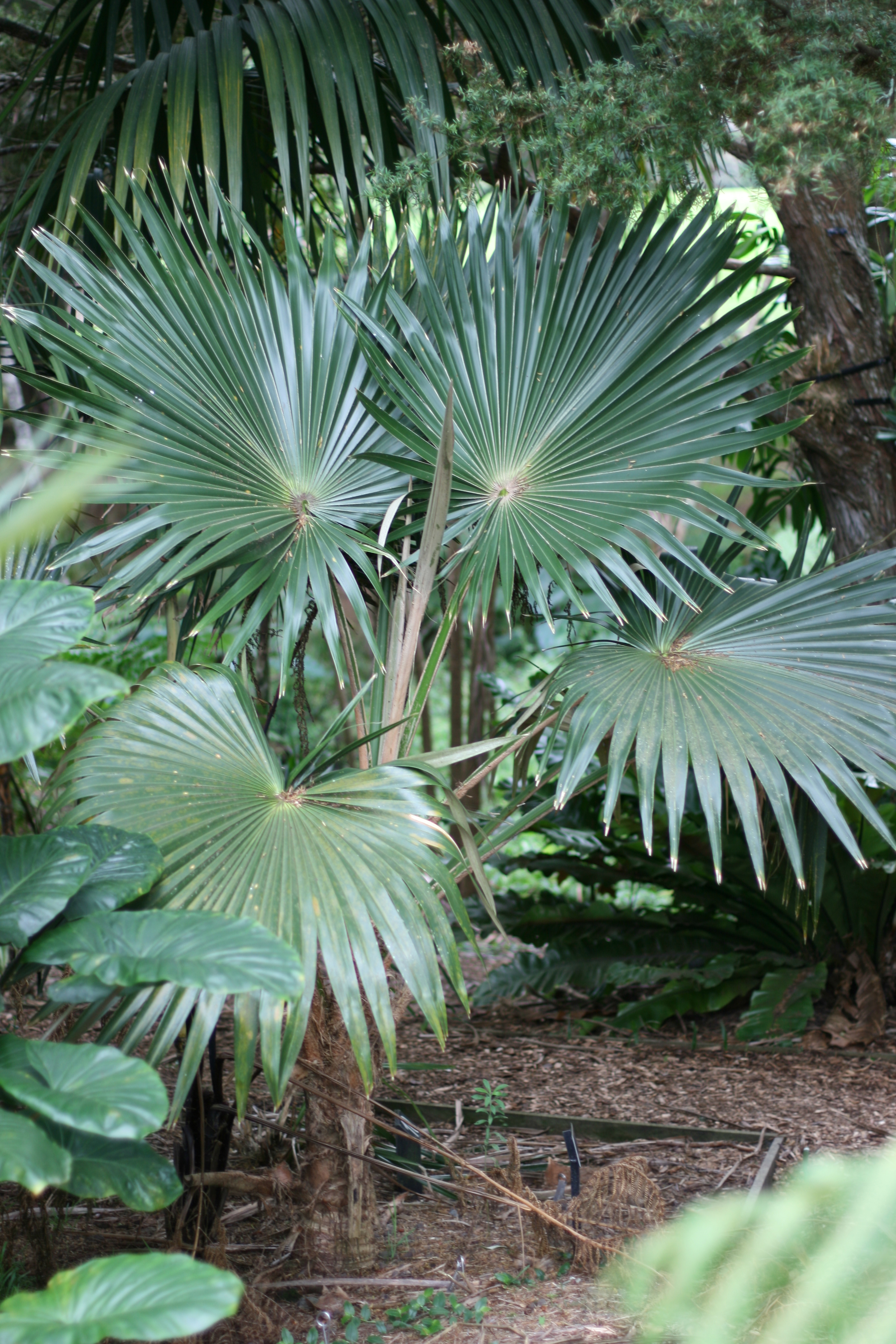
- Specimen growing in Auckland, New Zealand.
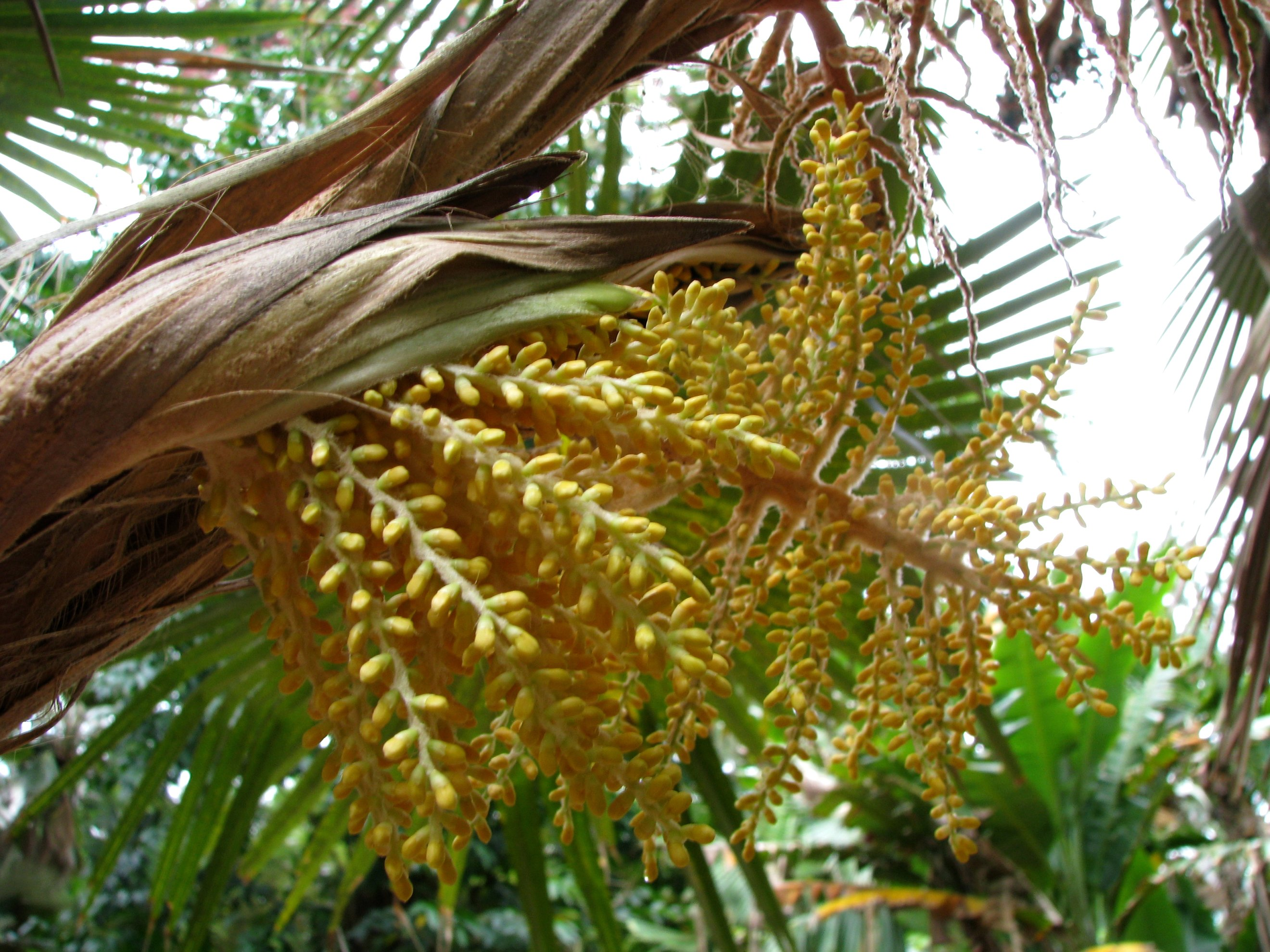

Conservation status
- Endangered (IUCN 3.1)

Scientific classification
- Kingdom: Plantae
- Clade: Tracheophytes
- Clade: Angiosperms
- Clade: Monocots
- Clade: Commelinids
- Order: Arecales
- Family: Arecaceae
- Tribe: Trachycarpeae
- Genus: Pritchardia
- Species: P. minor

Binomial name
- Pritchardia minor Becc.

= Pritchardia minor =

Species of palm

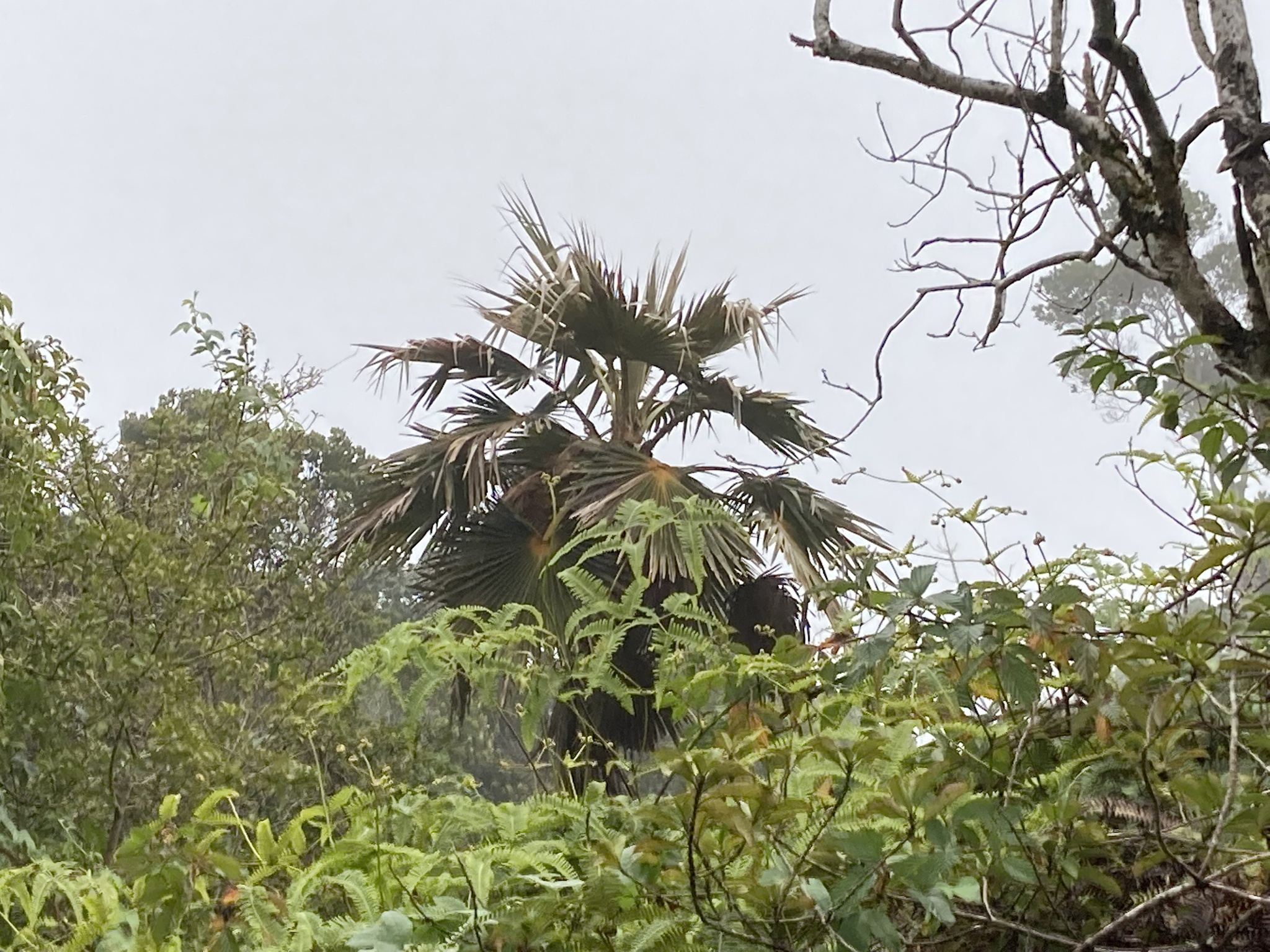
Growing in native habitat on Kaua'i

Pritchardia minor, the Alakai Swamp pritchardia or loulu, is a palm native to Hawaiʻi. It grows in wet forests in the centre of Kauaʻi at an elevation of about 1,400 metres (4,600 ft).

== Description ==
The Alakai Swamp pritchardia grows up to 12 metres (39 ft) high, and forms a trunk with a diameter of approximately 100 millimetres (3.9 in). The leaves are yellowish when they emerge, and this color is sometimes maintained on the undersides of mature leaves. The leaves are leathery and smooth above, but the undersides are waxy and have a covering of greyish to yellowish tomentum (felt) beneath. The shiny black fruits of this palm are ovoid, about 2 cm by 13 mm, and contain a seed up to 15 mm in diameter.

== Cultivation ==
This palm prefers a sunny, well drained, and moist location.

== Common names ==
- Alakaʻi Swamp pritchardia
- Alakaʻi loulu

== Synonyms ==
- Pritchardia eriophora
