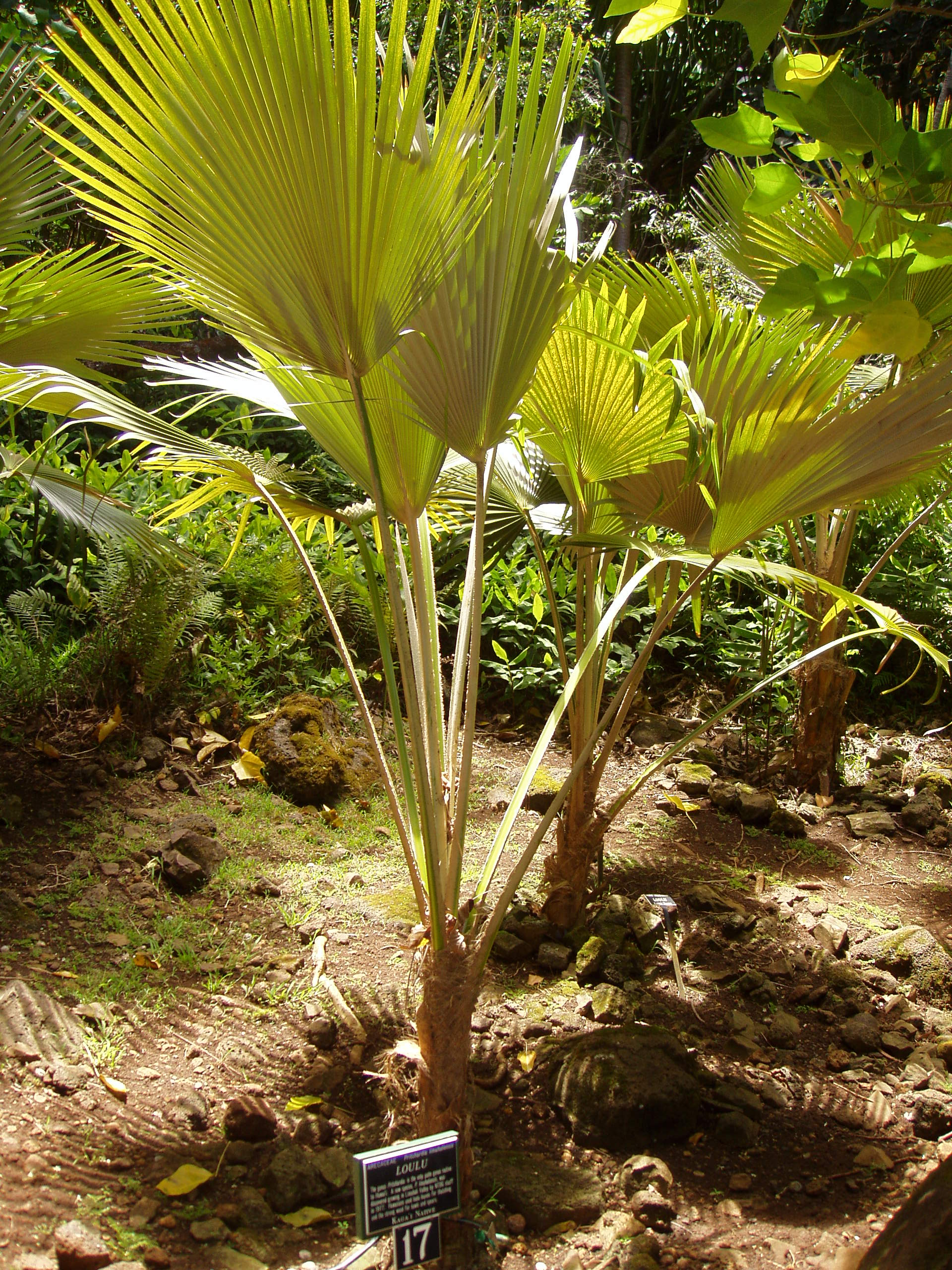
- Specimen growing in the Limahuli Garden and Preserve.

Conservation status
- Critically Endangered (IUCN 2.3)

Scientific classification
- Kingdom: Plantae
- Clade: Tracheophytes
- Clade: Angiosperms
- Clade: Monocots
- Clade: Commelinids
- Order: Arecales
- Family: Arecaceae
- Tribe: Trachycarpeae
- Genus: Pritchardia
- Species: P. limahuliensis

Binomial name
- Pritchardia limahuliensis St John

= Pritchardia limahuliensis =

Species of palm

Pritchardia limahuliensis, the Limahuli Valley pritchardia, is a palm native to Hawaii. It is a rare species, only discovered in 1977 by staff of the National Tropical Botanical Garden in the Limahuli Garden and Preserve, Kauai, Hawaii, where it is now being conserved. It is threatened by introduced rats, which eat the seeds.

It is a medium-sized palm, growing to 10 m tall, with palmate (fan-shaped) leaves.
