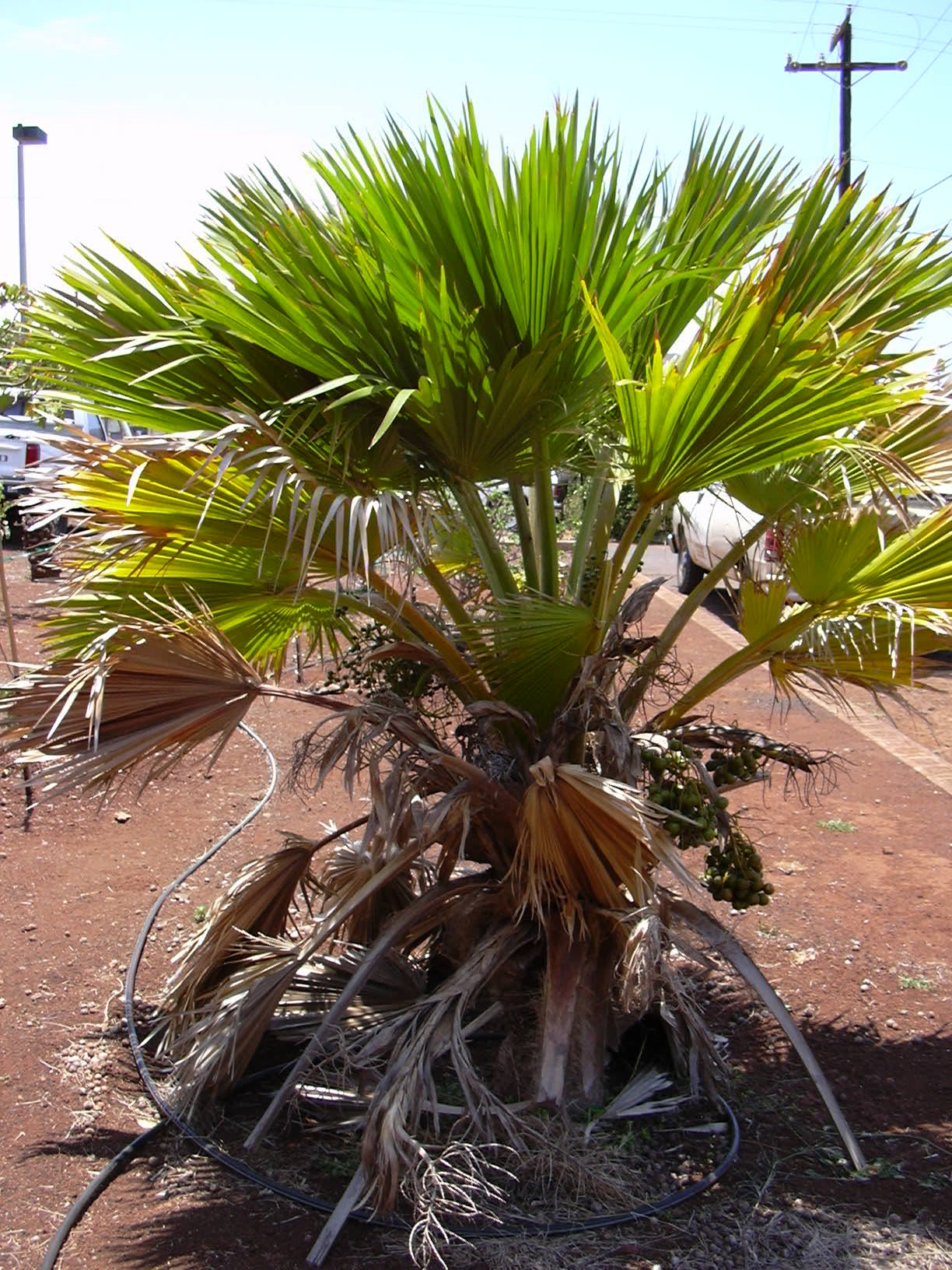

Conservation status
- Endangered (IUCN 2.3)

Scientific classification
- Kingdom: Plantae
- Clade: Tracheophytes
- Clade: Angiosperms
- Clade: Monocots
- Clade: Commelinids
- Order: Arecales
- Family: Arecaceae
- Tribe: Trachycarpeae
- Genus: Pritchardia
- Species: P. glabrata

Binomial name
- Pritchardia glabrata Becc. & Rock

= Pritchardia glabrata =

Species of palm

Pritchardia glabrata is a species of palm tree. It is endemic to the island of Maui in Hawaii. It grows at around 500–550 metres A.S.L. It grows on steep slopes between 300 and 900 metres (1000 and 3000 feet) above sea level on the Hawaiian Islands of Maui and Lanai, which are slightly drier. This is one of the small Pritchardia, with a slender trunk rarely reaching five meters (17 feet) in length, but otherwise similar to P. remote and P. waialealeana, with which it shares the same sort of simple trunk.
