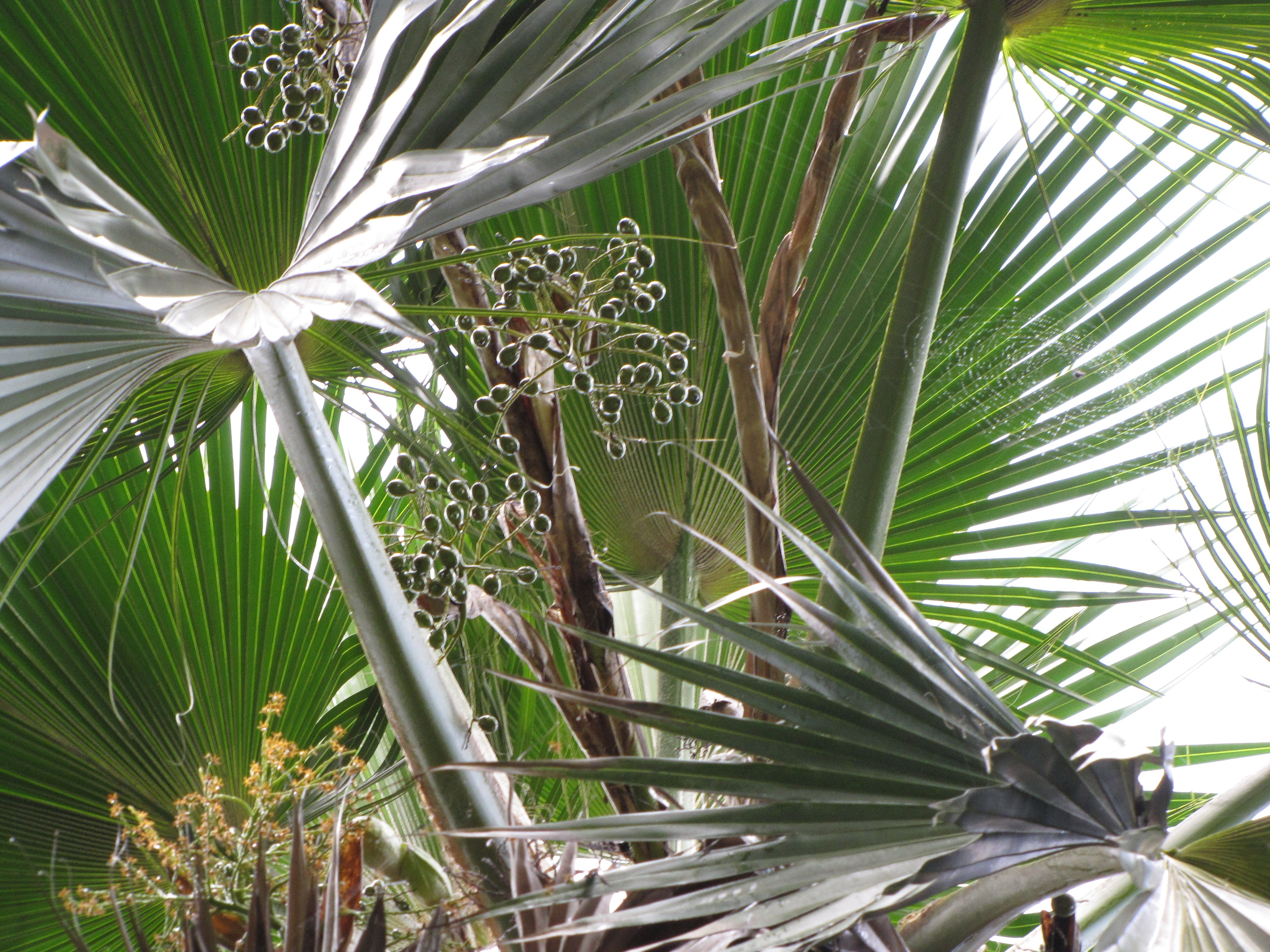

Conservation status
- Endangered (IUCN 2.3)

Scientific classification
- Kingdom: Plantae
- Clade: Tracheophytes
- Clade: Angiosperms
- Clade: Monocots
- Clade: Commelinids
- Order: Arecales
- Family: Arecaceae
- Tribe: Trachycarpeae
- Genus: Pritchardia
- Species: P. forbesiana

Binomial name
- Pritchardia forbesiana Rock

= Pritchardia forbesiana =

Species of palm

Pritchardia forbesiana, the Mt. Eke pritchardia, is a species of palm tree. It is endemic to the island of Maui in Hawaii. It grows in forests. Populations are recovering since the removal of destructive feral pigs.
