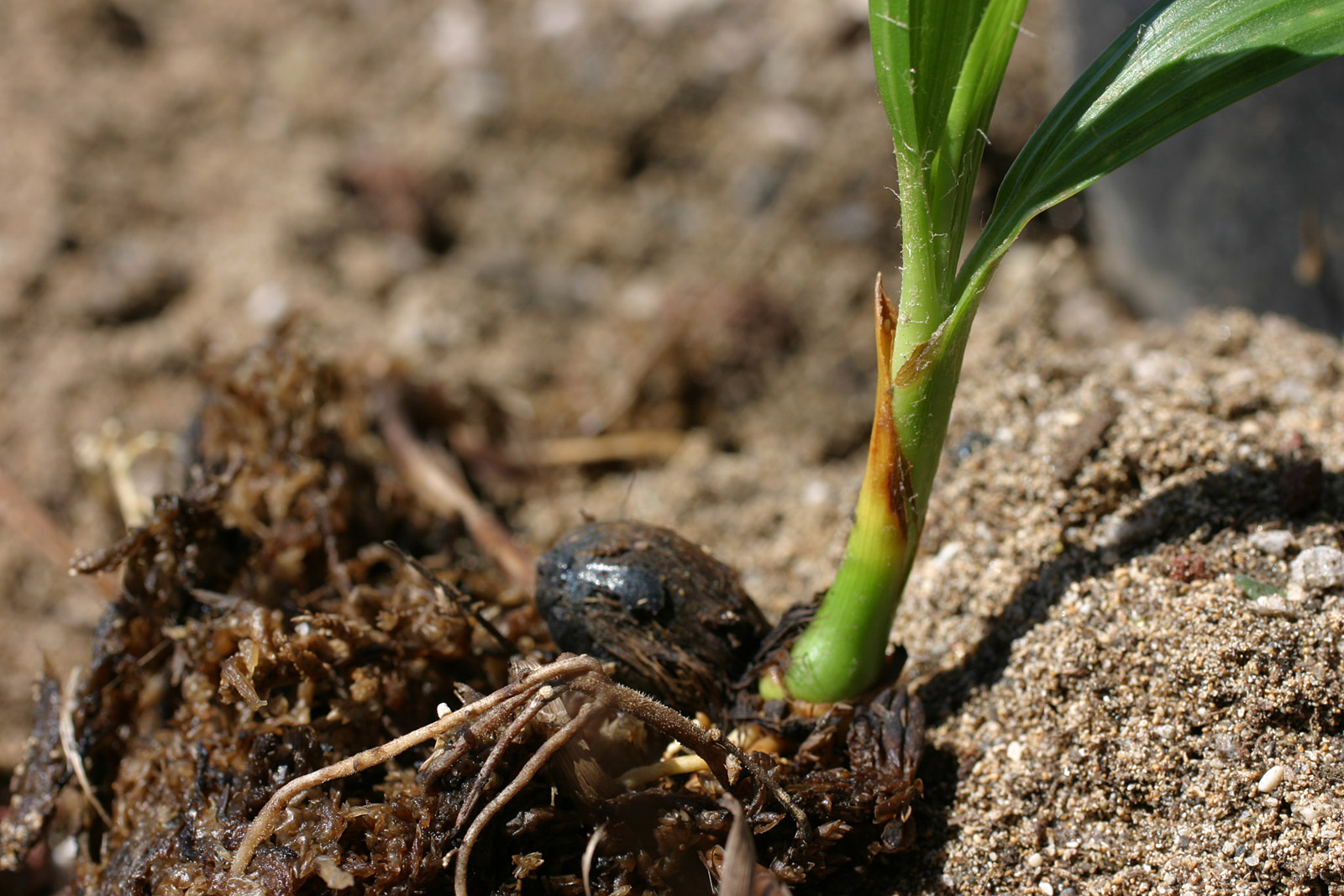
- A germinated seed of the critically endangered Pritchardia napaliensis

Conservation status
- Critically Endangered (IUCN 3.1)

Scientific classification
- Kingdom: Plantae
- Clade: Tracheophytes
- Clade: Angiosperms
- Clade: Monocots
- Clade: Commelinids
- Order: Arecales
- Family: Arecaceae
- Tribe: Trachycarpeae
- Genus: Pritchardia
- Species: P. napaliensis

Binomial name
- Pritchardia napaliensis H.St.John, 1981

Synonyms
- Pritchardia remota subsp. napaliensis (H.St.John) R.W.Read

= Pritchardia napaliensis =

Species of palm

Pritchardia napaliensis is a species of palm tree that is endemic to the island of Kauaʻi in Hawaii, United States. It inhabits gulch slopes in coastal mesic forests on the Nā Pali coastline, especially in the vicinity of Hoʻoluu Valley. P. napaliensis reaches a height of 4–6 m (13–20 ft) and a trunk diameter of 18–20 cm (7.1–7.9 in).
