= Pritchardia viscosa =

Stickybud pritchardia

Conservation status
- Critically Endangered (IUCN 3.1)

- Critically Imperiled (NatureServe)

Scientific classification
- Kingdom: Plantae
- Clade: Tracheophytes
- Clade: Angiosperms
- Clade: Monocots
- Clade: Commelinids
- Order: Arecales
- Family: Arecaceae
- Genus: Pritchardia
- Species: P. viscosa

Binomial name
- Pritchardia viscosa Becc.

Species of palm

Pritchardia viscosa, the stickybud pritchardia or loʻulu, is an extremely rare endangered species of Pritchardia palm that is endemic to the Hawaiian island of Kauaʻi.

It inhabits open wet forests in the Kalihiwai Valley, where it grows at altitudes of 500–700 m (1,600–2,300 ft). Associated plants include ʻaiea (Ilex anomala), ʻahakea (Bobea spp.), hame, (Antidesma spp.), hāpuʻu pulu (Cibotium glacum), and kōpiko (Psychotria hexandra).

It is a medium-sized palm from 6–8 m (20–26 ft) tall, with palmate (fan-shaped) leaves about 1 m (3.3 ft) long. The fruit is produced in dense clusters, each fruit green, pear-shaped, 4 cm (1.6 in) long and 2.5 cm (0.98 in) in diameter.

Like the related Nihoa Fan Palm (P. remota), it is susceptible to extinction by a single catastrophic event because of its wild population of four individuals. It is threatened by introduced rats, which eat the seeds. It has been cultivated to a moderate extent, but is exceptionally limited in its habitat.
