= Pritchardia vuylstekeana =

Conservation status
- Data Deficient (IUCN 3.1)

Scientific classification
- Kingdom: Plantae
- Clade: Embryophytes
- Clade: Tracheophytes
- Clade: Spermatophytes
- Clade: Angiosperms
- Clade: Monocots
- Clade: Commelinids
- Order: Arecales
- Family: Arecaceae
- Tribe: Trachycarpeae
- Genus: Pritchardia
- Species: P. vuylstekeana

Binomial name
- Pritchardia vuylstekeana H.Wendl. (1883)

Synonyms
- Eupritchardia pericularum (G.Nicholson) Kuntze (1898); Eupritchardia vluylstekeana (H.Wendl.) Kuntze (1898); Pritchardia moensii Becc. in Malesia 3: 300 (1890); Pritchardia pericularum G.Nicholson (1886); Styloma pericularum (G.Nicholson) O.F.Cook (1915); Styloma vuylstekeana (H.Wendl.) O.F.Cook (1915); Washingtonia pericularum (G.Nicholson) Kuntze (1891); Washingtonia vuylstekeana (H.Wendl.) Kuntze (1891)

Species of flowering plant

Pritchardia vuylstekeana is a species of flowering plant in the palm family, Arecaceae. It is a palm tree endemic to the Tuamotu Archipelago in French Polynesia.

== Bibliography ==
- Podevijn, D., ed. (1995). Charles Vuylsteke, sr. en jr., fine fleur van de Belgische sierteelt (1867-1937). Ghent: Raphael Vuylsteke (privately published).
