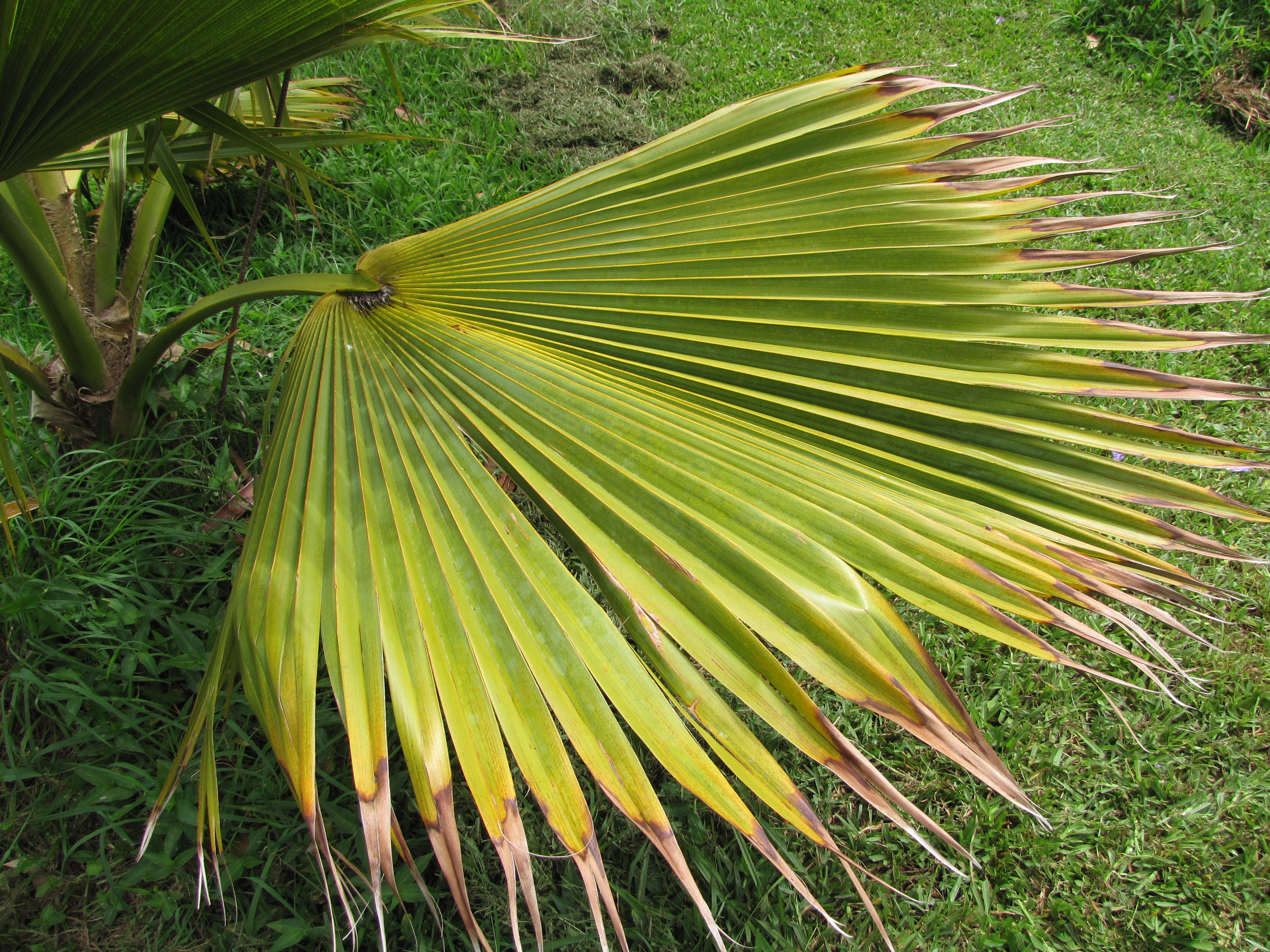
- Mitiaro fan plan frond at Pololoei Haiku, Maui, Hawaii

Conservation status
- Vulnerable (IUCN 3.1)

Scientific classification
- Kingdom: Plantae
- Clade: Embryophytes
- Clade: Tracheophytes
- Clade: Angiosperms
- Clade: Monocots
- Clade: Commelinids
- Order: Arecales
- Family: Arecaceae
- Tribe: Trachycarpeae
- Genus: Pritchardia
- Species: P. mitiaroana

Binomial name
- Pritchardia mitiaroana J.Dransf. & Y.Ehrh. (1995)

= Pritchardia mitiaroana =

Species of palm

Pritchardia mitiaroana, the Mitiaro fan palm or Iniao is a species of palm tree that is native to the island of Mitiaro in the Cook Islands. It grows on karst limestone on the island's makatea (fossilised uplifted reef), and grows to a height of 10m.

While previously believed to only be found on Mitiaro, in 2007 several clusters of fan palms on the islands of Niau and Makatea in the Tuamotus in French Polynesia were classified as belonging to the same species. Rarotongan oral histories record that there was once a strong sea route between Niau, the southern Cook Islands, and the Marquesas, which could have seen the plant transported between the islands. In 2007 there were an estimated 1000 individuals on Niau, and around 100 on Makatea. In 2019 there were 491 mature Iniao on Mitiaro.
