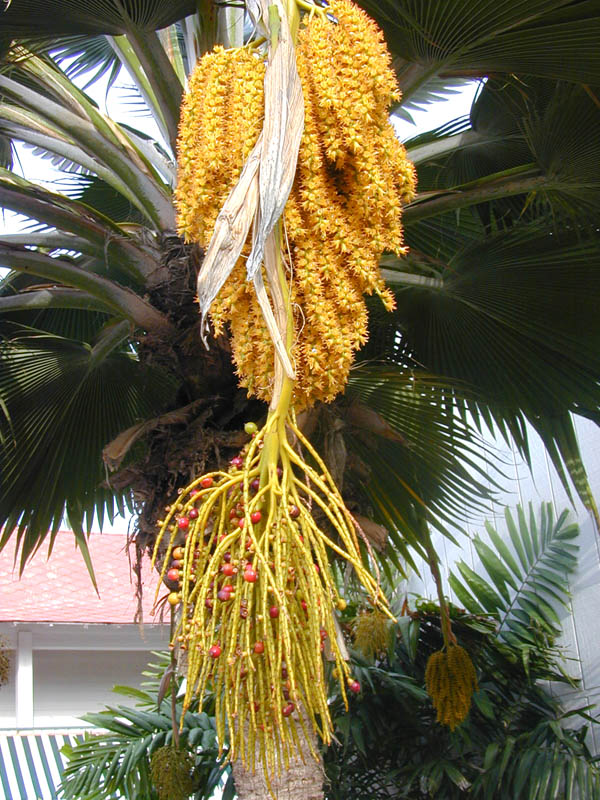
- Pritchardia sp. flowers and fruit on two pendulous stalks

Scientific classification
- Kingdom: Plantae
- Clade: Tracheophytes
- Clade: Angiosperms
- Clade: Monocots
- Clade: Commelinids
- Order: Arecales
- Family: Arecaceae
- Subfamily: Coryphoideae
- Tribe: Trachycarpeae
- Genus: Pritchardia; Seem. & H.Wendl.

Synonyms
- Eupritchardia Kuntze; Styloma O.F.Cook

= Pritchardia =

Genus of plants

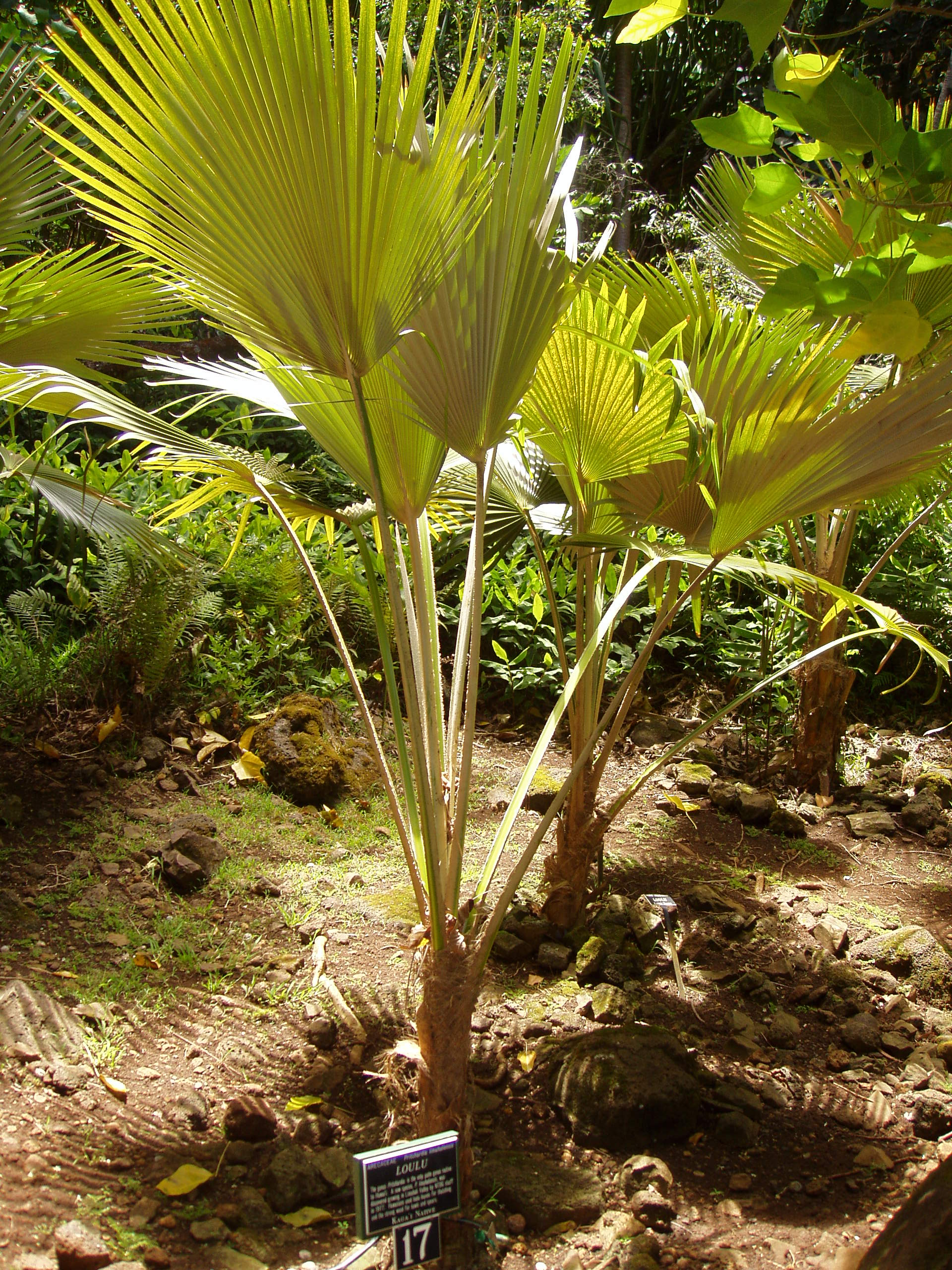
Pritchardia limahuliensis

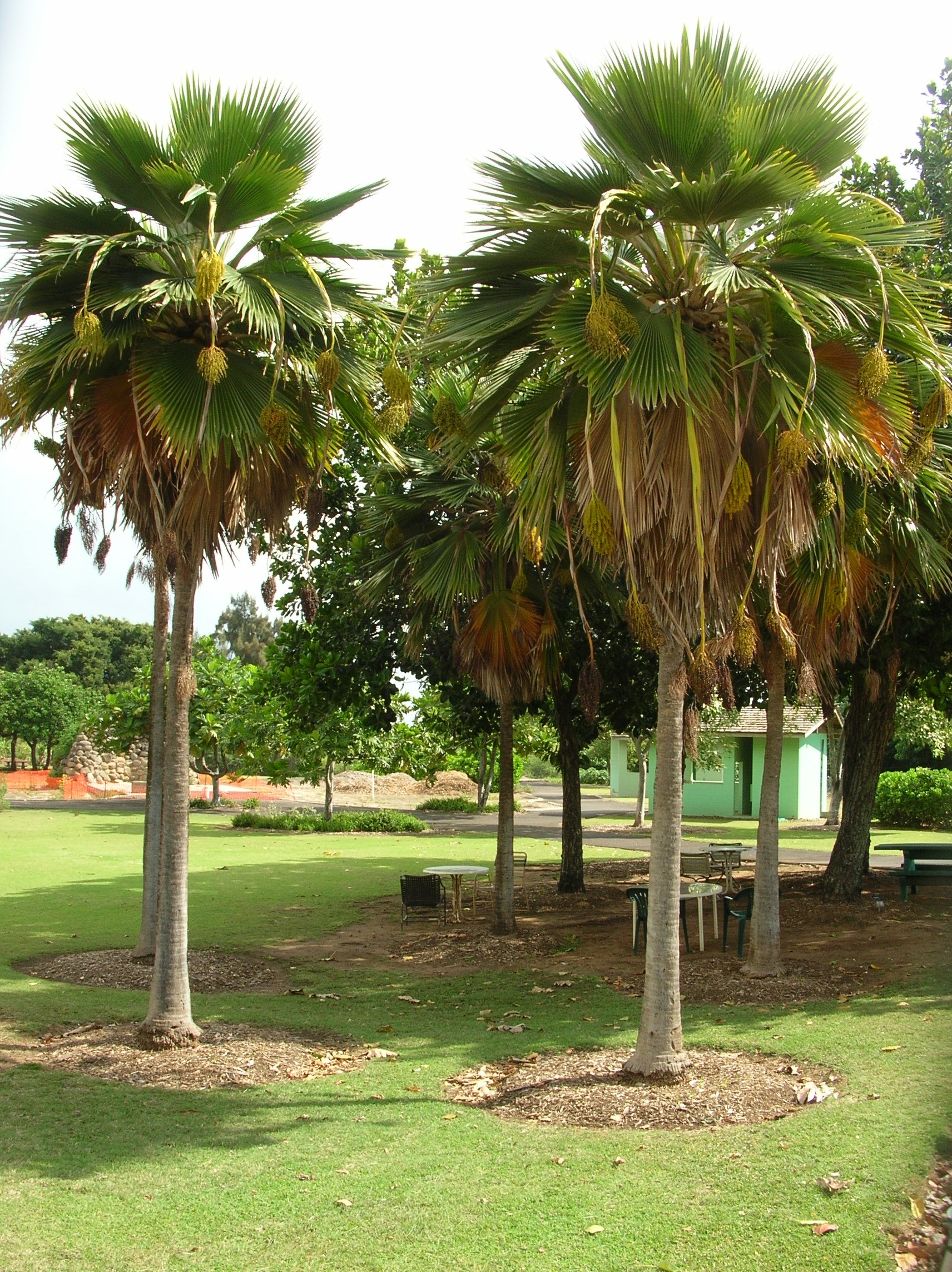
Pritchardia palms

The genus Pritchardia (family Arecaceae) consists of between 24 and 40 species of fan palms (subfamily Coryphoideae) found on tropical Pacific Ocean islands in Fiji, Samoa, Tonga, Tuamotus, and most diversely in Hawaii. The generic name honors William Thomas Pritchard (1829–1907), a British consul at Fiji.

== Description ==
These palms vary in height, ranging from 6 to 40 m (20 to 131 ft). The leaves are fan-shaped (costapalmate) and the trunk columnar, naked, smooth or fibrous, longitudinally grooved, and obscurely ringed by leaf scars. The flowers and subsequent fruit are borne in a terminal cluster with simple or compound branches of an arcuate or pendulous inflorescence that (in some species) is longer than the leaves.

== Species ==
There are 29 known species, of which 19 are endemic to the Hawaiian Islands, with the remainder on other island groups. Many are critically endangered. Oahu has the most named Pritchardia species of any of the Hawaiian islands, with nine named species on record in 1980. Eight of those species can be found in the rainy Koolau Range.

- Pritchardia affinis Becc. – Hawaiʻi Pritchardia (Island of Hawaiʻi)
- Pritchardia arecina Becc. – Maui Pritchardia (Maui, Hawaii)
- Pritchardia aylmer-robinsonii H.St.John (Niʻihau, Hawaii)
- Pritchardia bakeri Hodel – (Oahu, Hawaiian Islands)
- Pritchardia beccariana Rock – Kilauea Pritchardia (Island of Hawaiʻi)
- Pritchardia flynnii Lorence & Gemmill (Kauaʻi, Hawaii)
- Pritchardia forbesiana Rock – Mt. Eke Pritchardia (Maui, Hawaii)
- Pritchardia glabrata Becc. & Rock (Maui, Hawaii)
- Pritchardia gordonii Hodel (Hawaii: Kohala Mountains)
- Pritchardia hardyi Rock – Makaleha Pritchardia (Kauaʻi, Hawaii)
- Pritchardia hillebrandii (Kuntze) Becc. (Native range uncertain, but believed to be Molokaʻi, Hawaii)
- Pritchardia kaalae Rock – Waiʻanae Range Pritchardia (Oʻahu, Hawaii)
- Pritchardia kahukuensis Caum – (Oahu: NW. Koolau Mountains)
- Pritchardia lanaiensis Becc. & Rock – Lānaʻi Pritchardia (Lānaʻi, Hawaii)
- Pritchardia lanigera Becc. (Island of Hawaiʻi)
- Pritchardia limahuliensis H.St.John (Kauaʻi, Hawaii)
- Pritchardia lowreyana Rock – Molokaʻi Pritchardia (Molokaʻi, Hawaii)
- Pritchardia maideniana (Unknown origin, possibly Fiji or Tonga)
- Pritchardia martii (Gaud.) H.Wendl – Koʻolau Range pritchardia (syn. P. gaudichaudii) (Oʻahu, Hawaii)
- Pritchardia minor Becc. – Alakaʻi Swamp Pritchardia (Kauaʻi, Hawaii)
- Pritchardia mitiaroana Dransfield & Ehrhardt (Mitiaro, Cook Islands)
- Pritchardia munroi Rock – Kamalo Pritchardia (Molokaʻi, Hawaii)
- Pritchardia napaliensis H.St.John (Kauaʻi, Hawaii)
- Pritchardia pacifica Seem. & H.Wendl. (Fiji, Tonga, Samoa)
- Pritchardia perlmanii Gemmill (Kauaʻi, Hawaii)
- Pritchardia remota Becc. – Nīhoa Pritchardia (Nīhoa, Hawaii)
- Pritchardia schattaueri Hodel – Giant Pritchardia (Island of Hawaiʻi)
- Pritchardia tahuatana Butaud & Hodel (Marquesas: Tahuata and Fatu Hiva)
- Pritchardia thurstonii F.Muell. & Drude (Fiji and Tonga)
- Pritchardia viscosa Becc. – Stickybud Pritchardia (Kauaʻi, Hawaii)
- Pritchardia vuylstekeana H.Wendl. – Tuamotu Archipelago
- Pritchardia waialealeana R.W.Read (Kauaʻi, Hawaii)
- Pritchardia woodfordiana (Solomon Islands)
- Pritchardia woodii Hodel (Maui, Hawaii)
- †Pritchardia sp. "Laysan" (Laysan†)

=== Formerly placed here ===
- Licuala grandis (hort. ex W. Bull) H.Wendl. (as P. grandis hort. ex W. Bull) (Vanuatu)
- Washingtonia filifera (Linden ex André) H.Wendl. (as P. filamentosa H.Wendl. ex Franceschi or P. filifera Linden ex André) (Southwestern United States and Baja California)

== Relationship with humans ==
Native Hawaiians (who call them loulu or noulu) often plant the trees in their traditional homes. They often consume their seeds (known as hāwane or wāhane) raw, use their trunk wood as building material and leaves as roof thatching in houses and temples.

== See also ==
- Laysan fan palm
