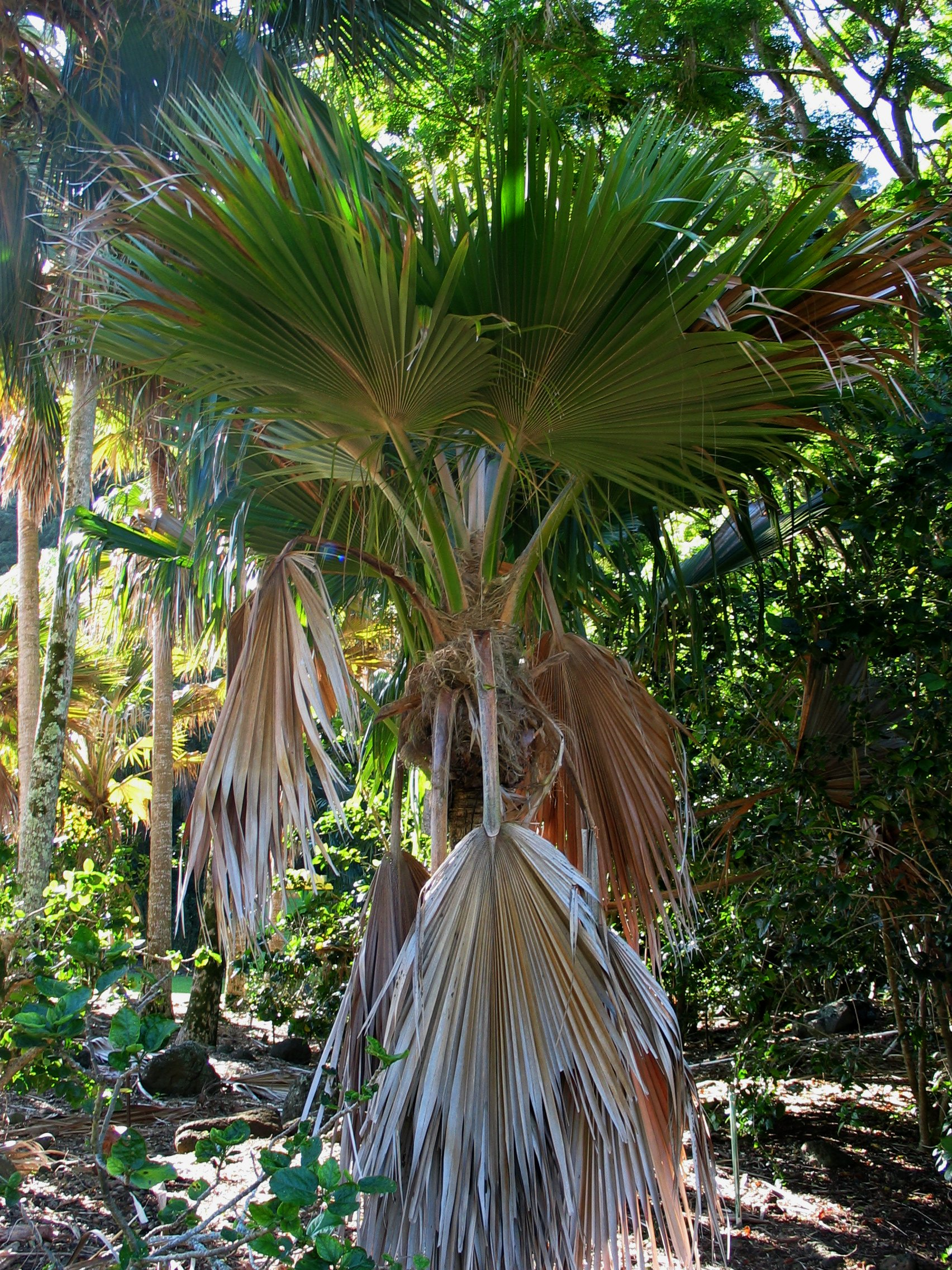

Conservation status
- Endangered (IUCN 2.3)

Scientific classification
- Kingdom: Plantae
- Clade: Tracheophytes
- Clade: Angiosperms
- Clade: Monocots
- Clade: Commelinids
- Order: Arecales
- Family: Arecaceae
- Tribe: Trachycarpeae
- Genus: Pritchardia
- Species: P. lanigera

Binomial name
- Pritchardia lanigera Becc.

= Pritchardia lanigera =

Species of palm

Pritchardia lanigera, the lo'ulu, is a species of flowering plant in the family Arecaceae that is endemic to the island of Hawaiʻi. It inhabits ridges, gulch sides, and gentle slopes in wet forests from sea level to 3,000 ft (910 m).P. lanigera reaches a height of 5 m (16 ft) and a trunk diameter of 30–50 cm (12–20 in). It is threatened by habitat loss.
