= Steve Perlman (botanist) =

Botanist

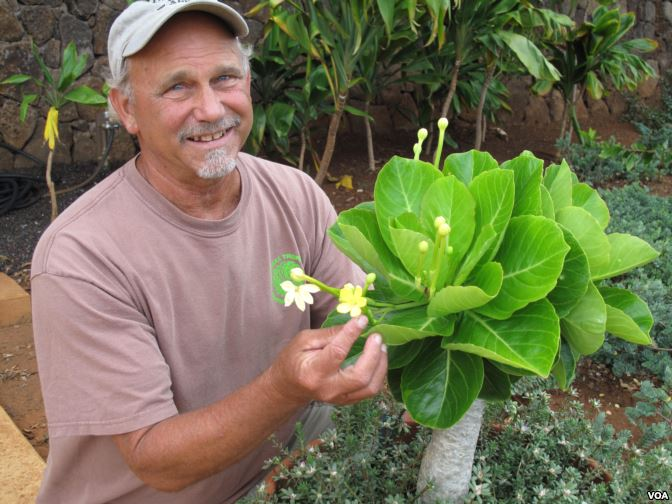
Perlman at the National Tropical Botanical Garden.

Steven "Steve" Perlman is a botanist known for his work at the National Tropical Botanical Garden in Hawaii.

Perlman has been at the forefront of protecting Hawaii’s endangered species for more than 40 years. He has been described as a "rock star" botanist by the Voice of America. In the 1970s, he pioneered rappelling down high cliffs to save the Brighamia insignis - a rare Hawaiian plant commonly known as the Alula. After a long career as a field botanist at the National Tropical Botanical Garden, Perlman is now (as of 2014) the statewide specialist for Hawaii’s Plant Extinction Prevention Program. The program focuses on protecting species with fewer than 50 plants remaining in the wild.

The specific epithet perlmanii in the palm Pritchardia perlmanii honors Steven Perlman who was first to notice the unique features of this species.
