= Pritchardia pacifica =

- Pritchardia pacifica Palm House, Kew Gardens

Conservation status
- Extinct in the Wild (IUCN 3.1)

Scientific classification
- Kingdom: Plantae
- Clade: Tracheophytes
- Clade: Angiosperms
- Clade: Monocots
- Clade: Commelinids
- Order: Arecales
- Family: Arecaceae
- Genus: Pritchardia
- Species: P. pacifica

Binomial name
- Pritchardia pacifica Seem. & H.Wendl.

Species of palm

Kew specimen viewed from above

Pritchardia pacifica, the Fiji fan palm, or piu, is a species of palm tree in the genus Pritchardia that is native to Tonga. It is also found in Fiji, Samoa, and the north-eastern part of India (especially in the tribal areas of Arunachal Pradesh, where people use it as thatched roofing), and the Marquesas. However, these populations are likely to be human introductions.

This species is found in tropical dry forests.

== Description ==
This species reaches a height of 15 metres (49 ft), with a smooth, grayish tan trunk 10 inches (25 cm) in diameter. The 20–30 leaves are 4 feet (1.2 m) wide and equally long, held on petioles 4 feet (1.2 m) in length. The large, flat and rounded leaves are divided 1/4-1/3 into many stiff-tipped segments. The inflorescences are composed of 1-4 panicles, shorter than or equalling the petioles in length. The panicles are branched to 2 orders, with glabrous rachillae. The flowers are followed by small, shiny dark brown to purplish black, spherical fruits, 0.4 inches (1.0 cm) in diameter.

Pritchardia pacifica is considered a host for a plant disease called Lethal Yellowing that is found in Florida, Puerto Rico, and Guam.

== Cultivation and uses ==
In Fiji the leaves of Fiji fan palm were traditionally used as fans, known as Iri masei or Ai viu, that were only used by the chiefs.

A light, flexible wood was used to construct a border for the leaves. In Fijian, the term Ai viu refers to both a fan and an umbrella, as the leaves of Fiji fan palm were used for protection from both the sun and the rain. The leaf was held immediately above the head when it was raining in order and the rain rolled off the leaf behind the head. The trunk of this species was occasionally used for ridge-beams. This species was associated with the upper classes and only one or two trees were usually found in a village, as these plants provided enough leaves to meet the material needs of the village chiefs.

This species is sought after by palm enthusiasts for cultivation and is widely grown as an ornamental plant throughout the Pacific and Southeast Asia. The fresh seed germinates well in high light environments with moist but well drained soil. The plants tolerate coastal spray.

== Gallery ==
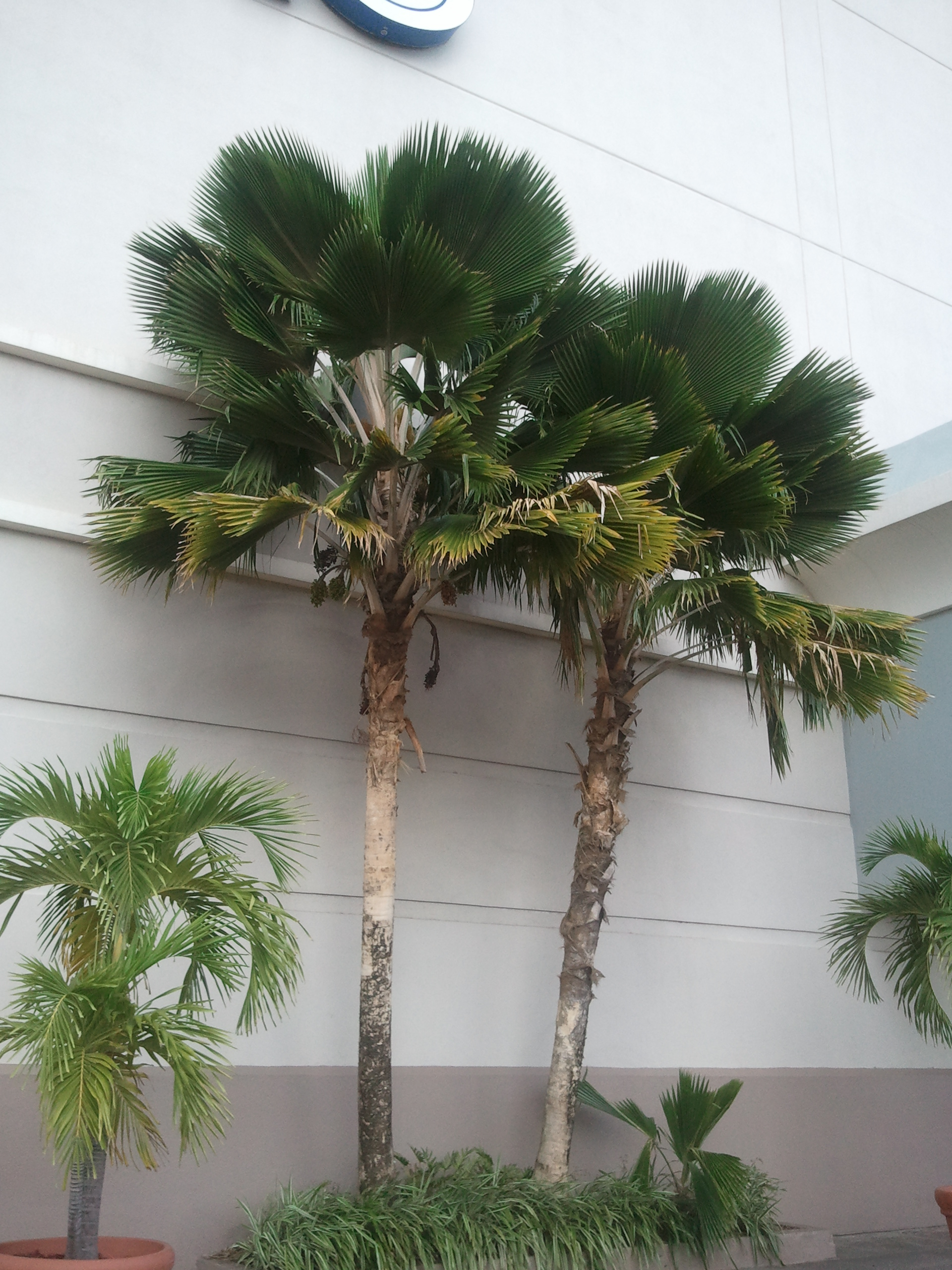
Mature trees.

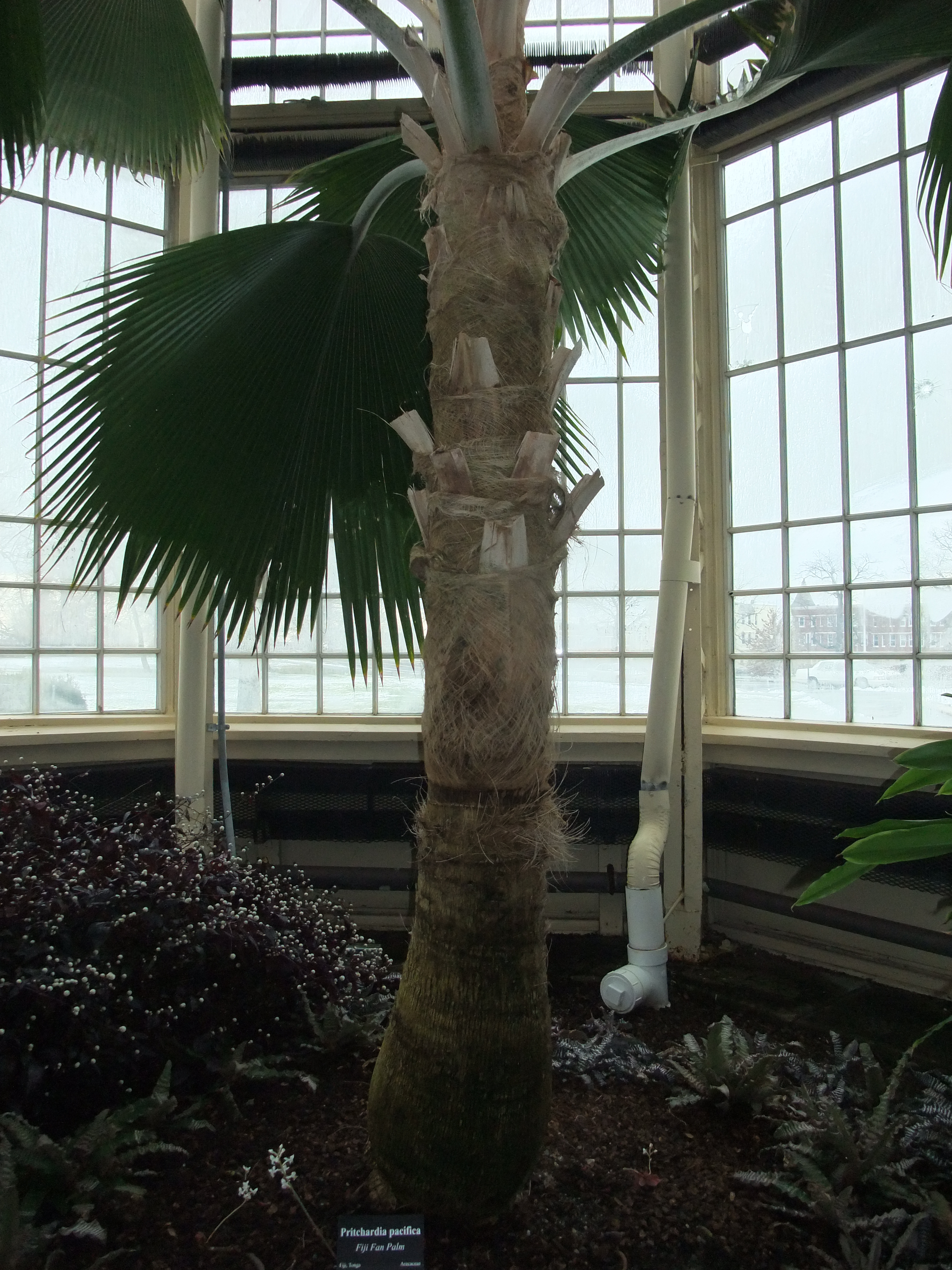
Trunk detail

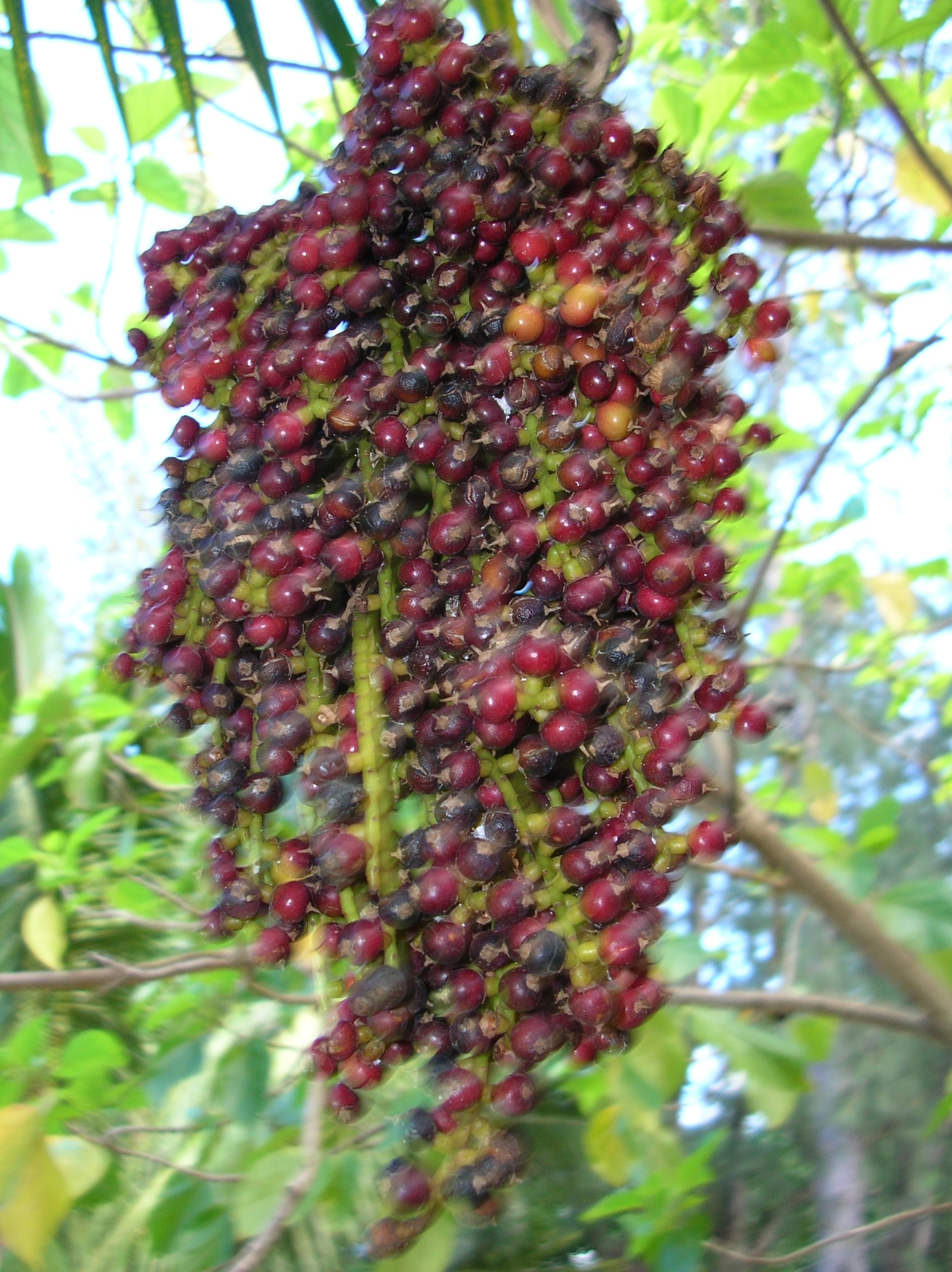
Ripe fruit on a palm in Hawaii.

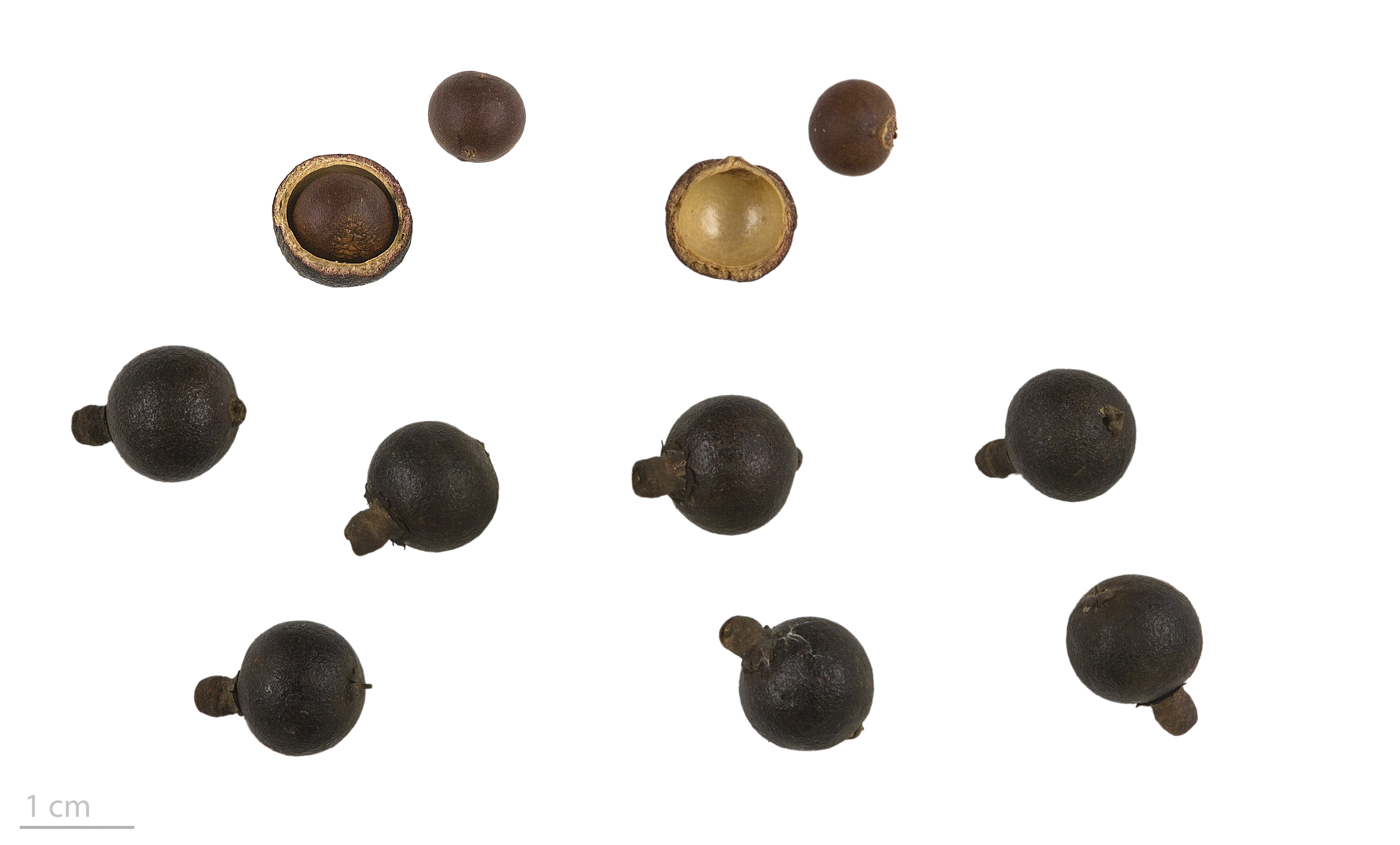
Pritchardia pacifica - MHNT
