= Merimnetria arcuata =

Scientific classification
- Domain: Eukaryota
- Kingdom: Animalia
- Phylum: Arthropoda
- Class: Insecta
- Order: Lepidoptera
- Family: Gelechiidae
- Genus: Merimnetria
- Species: M. arcuata

Binomial name
- Merimnetria arcuata (Walsingham, 1907)

Synonyms
- Merimnetria (Aristoteliodes) arcuata; Aristotelia arcuata Walsingham, 1907

Species of moth

Merimnetria arcuata is a moth of the family Gelechiidae. It was first described by Lord Walsingham in 1907. It is endemic to the Hawaiian island of Oahu.

The wingspan is about 12 mm. The forewings are whitish ocherous, gradually suffused from one-third with dull olive brown, leaving a tornal, and a smaller opposite costal patch of the pale ground color. There is a minute dark spot is visible in the fold a little beyond its middle. The hindwings are brownish gray.

The larvae feed on Kadua species. They mine the leaves of their host plant.
