= Merimnetria homoxyla =

Scientific classification
- Kingdom: Animalia
- Phylum: Arthropoda
- Class: Insecta
- Order: Lepidoptera
- Family: Gelechiidae
- Genus: Merimnetria
- Species: M. homoxyla

Binomial name
- Merimnetria homoxyla (Meyrick, 1928)

Synonyms
- Merimnetria (Aristoteliodes) homoxyla; Aristotelia homoxyla Meyrick, 1928

Species of moth

Merimnetria homoxyla is a moth of the family Gelechiidae. It was first described by Edward Meyrick in 1928. It is endemic to the Hawaiian island of Oahu.

The larvae feed on Kadua coriacea. The larvae make large galls on the new stems of the host plant.
