= Merimnetria multiformis =

Scientific classification
- Kingdom: Animalia
- Phylum: Arthropoda
- Class: Insecta
- Order: Lepidoptera
- Family: Gelechiidae
- Genus: Merimnetria
- Species: M. multiformis

Binomial name
- Merimnetria multiformis (Meyrick, 1928)

Synonyms
- Merimnetria (Aristoteliodes) multiformis; Aristotelia multiformis Meyrick, 1928

Species of moth

Merimnetria multiformis is a moth of the family Gelechiidae. It was first described by Edward Meyrick in 1928. It is endemic to the Hawaiian island of Oahu and possibly Hawaii.

The larvae feed on Kadua coriacea and Kadua macrocarpa. They mine the leaves of their host plant.
