= Merimnetria flaviterminella =

Scientific classification
- Domain: Eukaryota
- Kingdom: Animalia
- Phylum: Arthropoda
- Class: Insecta
- Order: Lepidoptera
- Family: Gelechiidae
- Genus: Merimnetria
- Species: M. flaviterminella

Binomial name
- Merimnetria flaviterminella Walsingham, 1907

Species of moth

Merimnetria flaviterminella is a moth of the family Gelechiidae. It was first described by Lord Walsingham in 1907. It is endemic to the island of Hawaii.

The wingspan is about 11 mm. The forewings are chocolate brown, with fuscous suffusion, especially at the base and along the costa and fold. There are a few steel-gray scales scattered about the end of the cell and beyond it, also about the middle of the fold and the costal and tornal cilia are grayish fuscous, terminal cilia pale ocherous. The hindwings are brownish fuscous.

The larvae possibly mine the leaves of Hedyotis species.
