= Merimnetria xylospila =

Scientific classification
- Kingdom: Animalia
- Phylum: Arthropoda
- Class: Insecta
- Order: Lepidoptera
- Family: Gelechiidae
- Genus: Merimnetria
- Species: M. xylospila

Binomial name
- Merimnetria xylospila (Meyrick, 1928)

Synonyms
- Merimnetria (Aristoteliodes) xylospila; Aristotelia xylospila Meyrick, 1928

Species of moth

Merimnetria xylospila is a moth of the family Gelechiidae. It was first described by Edward Meyrick in 1928. It is endemic to the Hawaiian island of Oahu.

The larvae feed on Kadua coriacea. They form large galls on the new stems of their host plant.
