= Merimnetria thurifica =

Scientific classification
- Kingdom: Animalia
- Phylum: Arthropoda
- Class: Insecta
- Order: Lepidoptera
- Family: Gelechiidae
- Genus: Merimnetria
- Species: M. thurifica

Binomial name
- Merimnetria thurifica (Meyrick, 1928)

Synonyms
- Merimnetria (Aristoteliodes) thurifica; Aristotelia thurifica Meyrick, 1928

Species of moth

Merimnetria thurifica is a moth of the family Gelechiidae. It was first described by Edward Meyrick in 1928. It is endemic to the Hawaiian island of Oahu.

The larvae feed on Kadua acuminata. They mine the leaves of their host plant.
