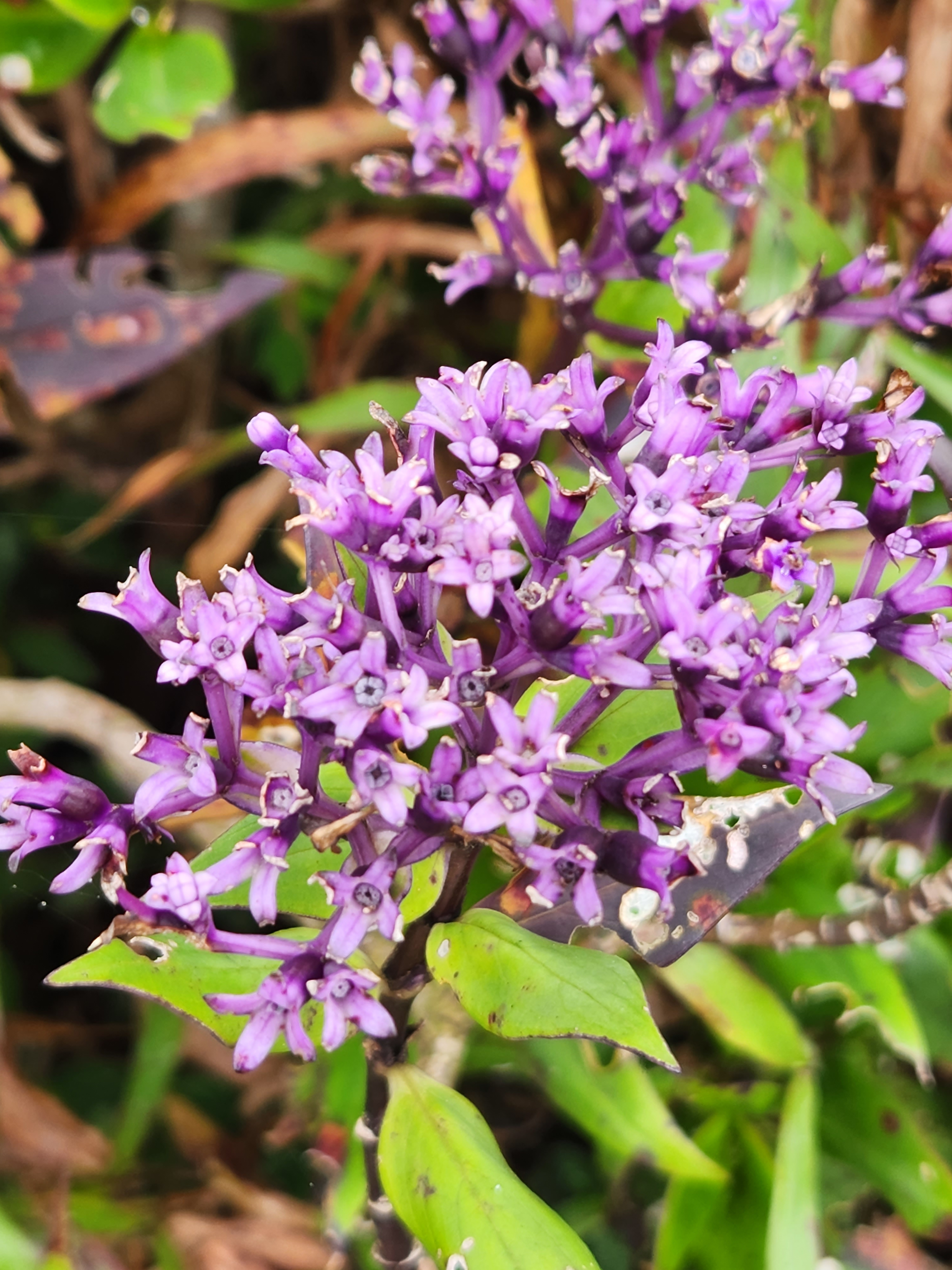

Scientific classification
- Kingdom: Plantae
- Clade: Tracheophytes
- Clade: Angiosperms
- Clade: Eudicots
- Clade: Asterids
- Order: Gentianales
- Family: Rubiaceae
- Genus: Hedyotis
- Species: H. purpurascens

Binomial name
- Hedyotis purpurascens Hook.f.

= Hedyotis purpurascens =

Species of plant

Hedyotis purpurascens is a species of woody erect shrub.

== Description ==
Hedyotis purpurascens is a small woody erect shrub, with branches that show prominent leaf scars. Elliptic-lanceolate glabrous leaves are acuminate with acute bases. Flowers are purple, with oblong calyx lobes.

== Range ==
Peninsular India.

== Habitat ==
This plant grows in grasslands.
