= Merimnetria nigriciliella =

Scientific classification
- Domain: Eukaryota
- Kingdom: Animalia
- Phylum: Arthropoda
- Class: Insecta
- Order: Lepidoptera
- Family: Gelechiidae
- Genus: Merimnetria
- Species: M. nigriciliella

Binomial name
- Merimnetria nigriciliella (Walsingham, 1907)

Synonyms
- Merimnetria (Aristoteliodes) nigriciliella; Aristotelia nigriciliella Walsingham, 1907

Species of moth

Merimnetria nigriciliella is a moth of the family Gelechiidae. It was first described by Lord Walsingham in 1907. It is endemic to the island of Hawaii.

The wingspan is 17–22 mm. The forewings are brownish cinereous (ash-gray), with diffused shading of scattered brown and brownish-fuscous scales, especially along the costa beyond the basal third, along the dorsum from the base to the tornus, and across the apical area. At one-third from the base an outwardly oblique chestnut-brown fascia runs from the costa to the fold, but scarcely reaches the dorsum (in some specimens this appears to be absent). The hindwings are shining, pale leaden gray.
