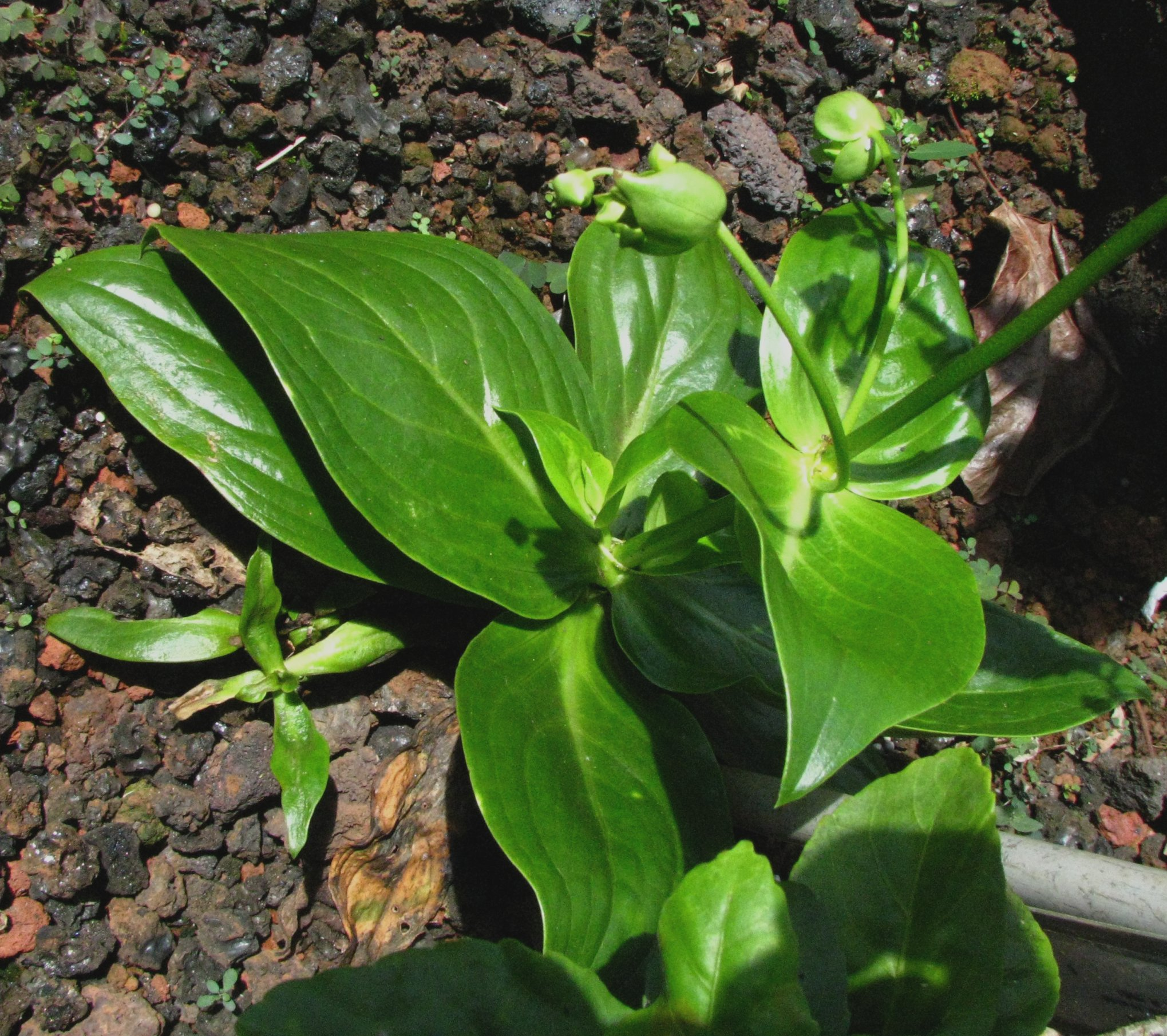
- Kadua st.-johnii

Conservation status
- Critically Imperiled (NatureServe)

Scientific classification
- Kingdom: Plantae
- Clade: Tracheophytes
- Clade: Angiosperms
- Clade: Eudicots
- Clade: Asterids
- Order: Gentianales
- Family: Rubiaceae
- Genus: Kadua
- Species: K. st-johnii

Binomial name
- Kadua st-johnii (B.C.Stone & Lane) W.L.Wagner & Lorence

Synonyms
- Hedyotis st-johnii B.C.Stone & Lane

= Kadua st-johnii =

Species of plant

Kadua st-johnii (formerly Hedyotis st-johnii) is a rare species of flowering plant in the coffee family known by the common name Nā Pali beach starviolet. It is endemic to Hawaii, where it is known only from the Nā Pali coast of Kauai. It is a federally listed endangered species of the United States.

This is a succulent perennial herb with squared stems that trail along the ground. The leaves are fleshy and mostly concentrated low on the stem. The flowers are borne in clusters. Each has a tubular corolla of green petals.

This plant occurs on north-facing cliffs above the beaches of the Nā Pali coast on Kauai. It grows low enough to be regularly misted by sea spray. Other plants in the habitat include naio (Myoporum sandwicense), kawelu (Eragrostis variabilis), ohelo kai (Lycium sandwicense), pili (Heteropogon contortus), ahinahina (Artemisia australis), and akoko (Chamaesyce celastroides).

By 2004 there were only three populations of this plant at Milolii, Kalalau, and Nualolo with a total global population of thirty plants. That year two more plants were discovered on a cliff at Awaawapuhi.

The main threat to this species has been damage to the habitat caused by feral goats. Today the plant grows only on vertical cliffs that the goats cannot traverse. Another major threat is the invasion of introduced species of plants, including sourbrush (Pluchea carolinensis), lantana (Lantana camara), daisy fleabane (Erigeron karvinskianus), haole koa (Leucaena leucocephala), billygoat weed (Ageratina conyzoides), and hairy spurge (Chamaesyce hirta).
