= Hedyotis indirae =

Scientific classification
- Kingdom: Plantae
- Clade: Tracheophytes
- Clade: Angiosperms
- Clade: Eudicots
- Clade: Asterids
- Order: Gentianales
- Family: Rubiaceae
- Genus: Hedyotis
- Species: H. indirae

Binomial name
- Hedyotis indirae K.M.P.Kumar & Aiswarya

Coffee plant

Hedyotis indirae is a species of flowering plant in the coffee family Rubiaceae that is endemic to Western Ghats in India. It is a new shrubby species of Rubiaceae from Muthikulam forest of Palakkad district in Kerala.
