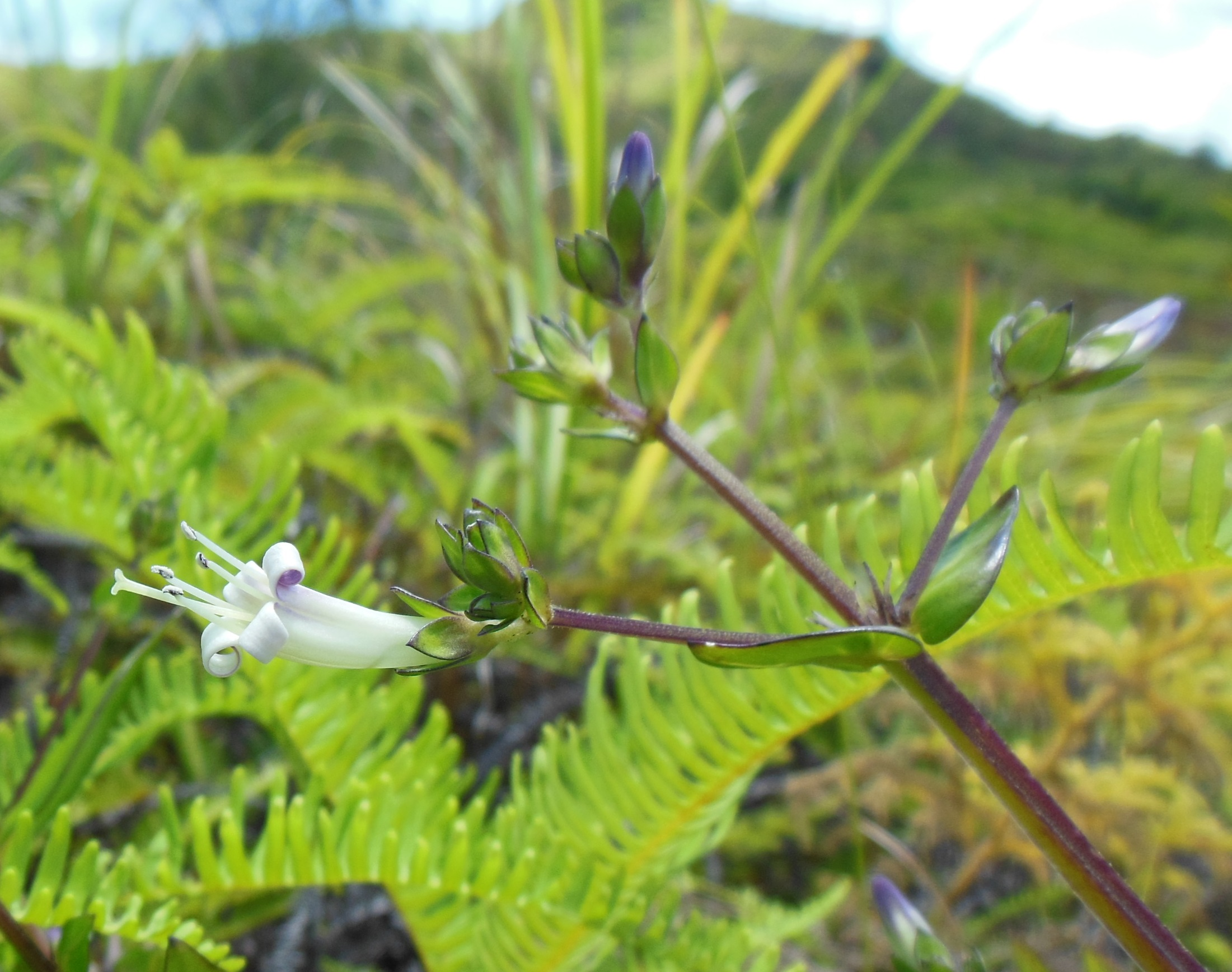

Conservation status
- Endangered (ESA)

Scientific classification
- Kingdom: Plantae
- Clade: Tracheophytes
- Clade: Angiosperms
- Clade: Eudicots
- Clade: Asterids
- Order: Gentianales
- Family: Rubiaceae
- Genus: Hedyotis
- Species: H. megalantha

Binomial name
- Hedyotis megalantha Merr.

Synonyms
- Oldenlandia megalantha (Merr.) Valeton

= Hedyotis megalantha =

Species of plant

Hedyotis megalantha is an herb or small shrub in the Rubiaceae family that is endemic to the volcanic soils of southern Guam. The species was described in 1914 by Elmer Drew Merrill.
