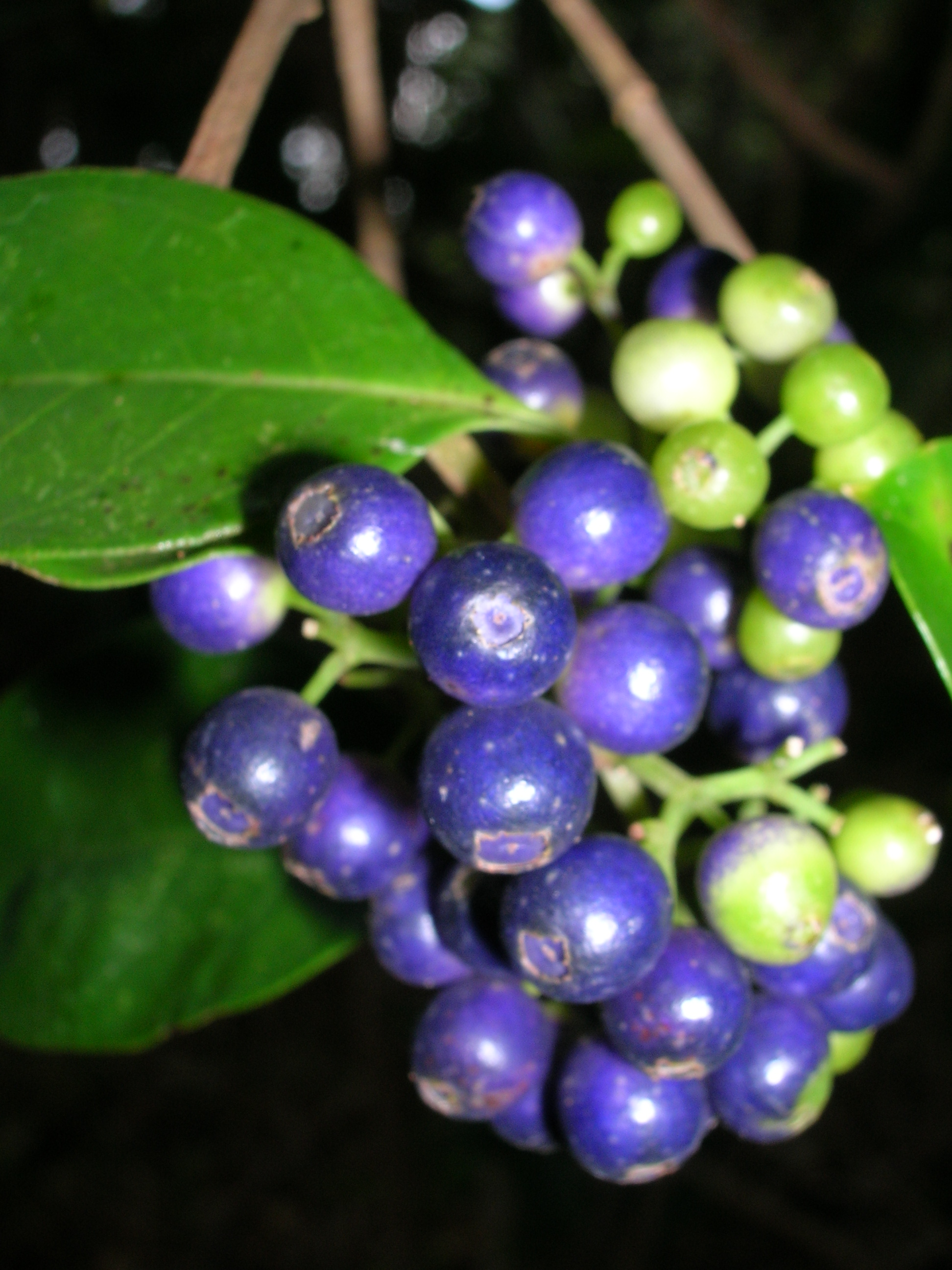
- Fruit
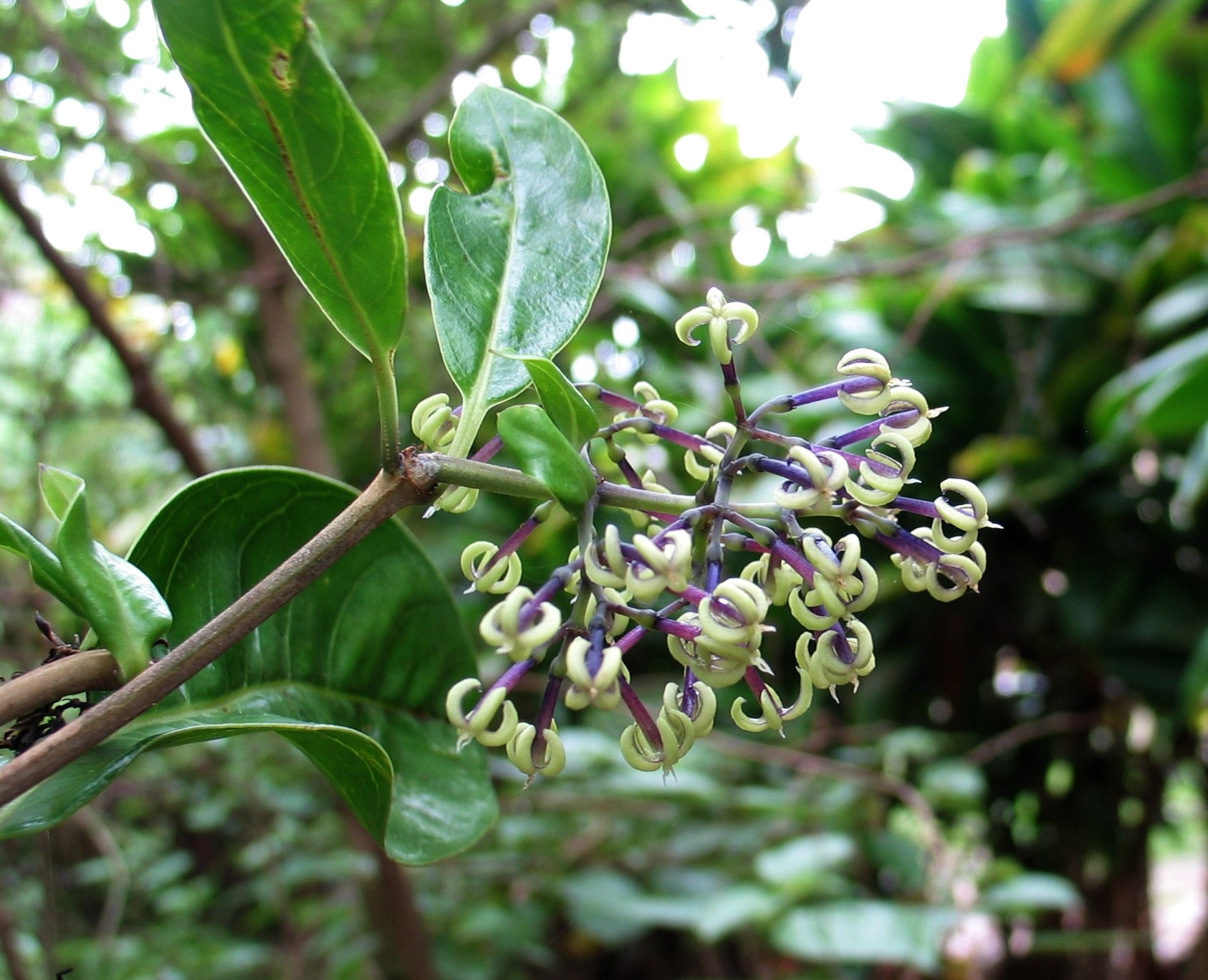
- Flowers and leaves

Scientific classification
- Kingdom: Plantae
- Clade: Tracheophytes
- Clade: Angiosperms
- Clade: Eudicots
- Clade: Asterids
- Order: Gentianales
- Family: Rubiaceae
- Genus: Kadua
- Species: K. affinis

Binomial name
- Kadua affinis Cham. & Schltdl.

Synonyms
- List: Gouldia affinis Wilbur; Gouldia affinis var. gracilis (Fosberg) O.Deg. & I.Deg.; Gouldia affinis var. robusta (Fosberg) O.Deg. & I.Deg.; Gouldia angustifolia (Fosberg) O.Deg. & I.Deg.; Gouldia antiqua (Fosberg) O.Deg. & I.Deg.; Gouldia antiqua (Fosberg) Skottsb.; Gouldia antiqua var. acuta (Fosberg) O.Deg. & I.Deg.; Gouldia antiqua var. hirtellifolia (Fosberg) O.Deg. & I.Deg.; Gouldia antiqua var. kauensis (Fosberg) O.Deg. & I.Deg.; Gouldia antiqua var. kehena (Fosberg) O.Deg. & I.Deg.; Gouldia antiqua var. oblonga (Fosberg) O.Deg. & I.Deg.; Gouldia arborescens (Wawra) A.Heller; Gouldia aspera (Fosberg) O.Deg. & I.Deg.; Gouldia bobeoides (Fosberg) O.Deg. & I.Deg.; Gouldia cirrhopetiolata H.Lév.; Gouldia congesta (Fosberg) O.Deg. & I.Deg.; Gouldia cordata (Wawra) Skottsb.; Gouldia cordata var. acuminata (Fosberg) O.Deg. & I.Deg.; Gouldia cordata var. molokaiensis (Fosberg) O.Deg. & I.Deg.; Gouldia cordata var. nealiae (Fosberg) O.Deg. & I.Deg.; Gouldia coriacea (Hook. & Arn.) Hillebr.; Gouldia crassicaulis (Fosberg) O.Deg. & I.Deg.; Gouldia degeneri (Fosberg) O.Deg. & I.Deg.; Gouldia elongata A.Heller; Gouldia elongata var. hirtellicostata (Fosberg) O.Deg. & I.Deg.; Gouldia elongata var. kahili (Fosberg) O.Deg. & I.Deg.; Gouldia forbesii (Fosberg) O.Deg. & I.Deg.; Gouldia fosbergii O.Deg. & I.Deg.; Gouldia fosbergii var. albicaulis (Fosberg) O.Deg. & I.Deg.; Gouldia fosbergii var. macrophylla (Fosberg) O.Deg. & I.Deg.; Gouldia glabra (Fosberg) O.Deg. & I.Deg.; Gouldia glabra var. parvithyrsa (Fosberg) O.Deg. & I.Deg.; Gouldia glabra var. waipioensis (Fosberg) O.Deg. & I.Deg.; Gouldia gracilis (Fosberg) Skottsb.; Gouldia hathewayi (Fosberg) O.Deg. & I.Deg.; Gouldia hirtella Hillebr.; Gouldia hirtella var. epiphytica Hochr.; Gouldia hirtella var. stipulacea (Wawra) Wawra; Gouldia hosakai (Fosberg) O.Deg. & I.Deg.; Gouldia kaala (Fosberg) Skottsb.; Gouldia kaala var. russii (Fosberg) O.Deg. & I.Deg.; Gouldia kapuaensis (Fosberg) O.Deg. & I.Deg.; Gouldia kapuaensis var. pittosporoides (Fosberg) O.Deg. & I.Deg.; Gouldia kapuaensis var. rigidifolia (Fosberg) O.Deg. & I.Deg.; Gouldia kapuaensis var. rigidifolioides (Fosberg) O.Deg. & I.Deg.; Gouldia kapuaensis var. violetae (Fosberg) O.Deg. & I.Deg.; Gouldia konaensis (Fosberg) O.Deg. & I.Deg.; Gouldia konaensis var. latifolia (Fosberg) O.Deg. & I.Deg.; Gouldia lanai (Fosberg) O.Deg. & I.Deg.; Gouldia lanceolata (Wawra) A.Heller; Gouldia macrocarpa Hillebr.; Gouldia macrocarpa var. cuneata (Fosberg) O.Deg. & I.Deg.; Gouldia macrocarpa var. sambucina (A.Heller) O.Deg. & I.Deg.; Gouldia macrocarpa var. sclerophylla (Fosberg) O.Deg. & I.Deg.; Gouldia macrocarpa var. teres (Fosberg) O.Deg. & I.Deg.; Gouldia macrothyrsa (Fosberg) Skottsb.; Gouldia myrsinoides (Fosberg) O.Deg. & I.Deg.; Gouldia osteocarpa (Fosberg) O.Deg. & I.Deg.; Gouldia ovata (Wawra) Skottsb.; Gouldia ovata var. heterophylla (Fosberg) O.Deg. & I.Deg.; Gouldia ovata var. kalaupapa (Fosberg) O.Deg. & I.Deg.; Gouldia ovata var. lydgatei (Fosberg) O.Deg. & I.Deg.; Gouldia ovata var. makawaoensis (Fosberg) O.Deg. & I.Deg.; Gouldia ovata var. maunahui (Fosberg) O.Deg. & I.Deg.; Gouldia ovata var. membranacea (Fosberg) O.Deg. & I.Deg.; Gouldia ovata var. oahuensis (Fosberg) O.Deg. & I.Deg.; Gouldia ovata var. obovata (Fosberg) O.Deg. & I.Deg.; Gouldia ovata var. petiolata (Fosberg) O.Deg. & I.Deg.; Gouldia ovata var. punaula (Fosberg) O.Deg. & I.Deg.; Gouldia ovata var. russii (Fosberg) O.Deg. & I.Deg.; Gouldia ovata var. santalifolia (Fosberg) O.Deg. & I.Deg.; Gouldia ovata var. storeyi (Fosberg) O.Deg. & I.Deg.; Gouldia ovata var. suehiroae (Fosberg) O.Deg. & I.Deg.; Gouldia ovata var. wailauensis (Fosberg) O.Deg. & I.Deg.; Gouldia parvifolia (Wawra) O.Deg. & I.Deg.; Gouldia parvifolia var. subpilosa (Fosberg) O.Deg. & I.Deg.; Gouldia parvula var. impressa (Fosberg) O.Deg. & I.Deg.; Gouldia pedunculata (Fosberg) O.Deg. & I.Deg.; Gouldia pseudodichotoma (Fosberg) O.Deg. & I.Deg.; Gouldia pubescens (Fosberg) O.Deg. & I.Deg.; Gouldia purpurea (Fosberg) Skottsb.; Gouldia quadrangularis (Fosberg) O.Deg. & I.Deg.; Gouldia rotundifolia (Fosberg) O.Deg. & I.Deg.; Gouldia sambucina A.Heller; Gouldia sandwicensis A.Gray; Gouldia sandwicensis var. arborescens Wawra; Gouldia sandwicensis var. cordata Wawra; Gouldia sandwicensis var. coriacea (Hook. & Arn.) A.Gray; Gouldia sandwicensis var. lanceolata Wawra; Gouldia sandwicensis var. ovata Wawra; Gouldia sandwicensis var. parvifolia Wawra; Gouldia sandwicensis var. stipulacea Wawra; Gouldia sandwicensis var. terminalis (Hook. & Arn.) A.Gray; Gouldia scleroticta (Fosberg) O.Deg. & I.Deg.; Gouldia skottsbergii (Fosberg) O.Deg. & I.Deg.; Gouldia stipulacea (Wawra) O.Deg. & I.Deg.; Gouldia stipulacea var. rockii (Fosberg) O.Deg. & I.Deg.; Gouldia subcordata (Fosberg) O.Deg. & I.Deg.; Gouldia tenuicaulis (Fosberg) O.Deg. & I.Deg.; Gouldia terminalis (Hook. & Arn.) Hillebr.; Gouldia terminalis f. acuminata Fosberg; Gouldia terminalis f. acuta Fosberg; Gouldia terminalis f. albicaulis Fosberg; Gouldia terminalis var. angustifolia Fosberg; Gouldia terminalis var. antiqua Fosberg; Gouldia terminalis var. arborescens (Wawra) Fosberg; Gouldia terminalis var. aspera Fosberg; Gouldia terminalis var. bobeoides Fosberg; Gouldia terminalis var. congesta Fosberg; Gouldia terminalis var. cordata (Wawra) Fosberg; Gouldia terminalis var. coriacea (Hook. & Arn.) Fosberg; Gouldia terminalis var. crassicaulis Fosberg; Gouldia terminalis f. cuneata Fosberg; Gouldia terminalis var. degeneri Fosberg; Gouldia terminalis var. elongata (A.Heller) Fosberg; Gouldia terminalis f. euantiqua Fosberg; Gouldia terminalis f. euarborescens Fosberg; Gouldia terminalis f. eucordata Fosberg; Gouldia terminalis f. euelongata Fosberg; Gouldia terminalis f. euglabra Fosberg; Gouldia terminalis f. eukaala Fosberg; Gouldia terminalis f. eukapuaensis Fosberg; Gouldia terminalis f. eukonaensis Fosberg; Gouldia terminalis f. eumacrocarpa Fosberg; Gouldia terminalis f. euovata Fosberg; Gouldia terminalis f. euparvifolia Fosberg; Gouldia terminalis f. eustipulacea Fosberg; Gouldia terminalis f. eutypica Fosberg; Gouldia terminalis var. forbesii Fosberg; Gouldia terminalis var. glabra Fosberg; Gouldia terminalis f. gracilis Fosberg; Gouldia terminalis var. hathewayi Fosberg; Gouldia terminalis f. heterophylla Fosberg; Gouldia terminalis f. hirtellicostata Fosberg; Gouldia terminalis f. hirtellifolia Fosberg; Gouldia terminalis var. hosakai Fosberg; Gouldia terminalis f. impressa Fosberg; Gouldia terminalis var. kaala Fosberg; Gouldia terminalis f. kahili Fosberg; Gouldia terminalis f. kalaupapa Fosberg; Gouldia terminalis var. kapuaensis Fosberg; Gouldia terminalis f. kauensis Fosberg; Gouldia terminalis f. kehena Fosberg; Gouldia terminalis var. konaensis Fosberg; Gouldia terminalis var. lanai Fosberg; Gouldia terminalis f. latifolia Fosberg; Gouldia terminalis f. lydgatei Fosberg; Gouldia terminalis var. macrocarpa (Hillebr.) Fosberg; Gouldia terminalis f. macrophylla Fosberg; Gouldia terminalis var. macrothyrsa Fosberg; Gouldia terminalis f. makawaoensis Fosberg; Gouldia terminalis f. maunahui Fosberg; Gouldia terminalis f. membranacea Fosberg; Gouldia terminalis f. molokaiensis Fosberg; Gouldia terminalis var. myrsinoidea Fosberg; Gouldia terminalis f. nealiae Fosberg; Gouldia terminalis f. oahuensis Fosberg; Gouldia terminalis f. oblonga Fosberg; Gouldia terminalis f. obovata Fosberg; Gouldia terminalis var. osteocarpa Fosberg; Gouldia terminalis var. ovata (Wawra) Fosberg; Gouldia terminalis var. parvifolia (Wawra) Fosberg; Gouldia terminalis f. parvithyrsa Fosberg; Gouldia terminalis var. pedunculata Fosberg; Gouldia terminalis f. petiolata Fosberg; Gouldia terminalis f. pittosporoides Fosberg; Gouldia terminalis var. pseudodichotoma Fosberg; Gouldia terminalis var. pubescens Fosberg; Gouldia terminalis f. punaula Fosberg; Gouldia terminalis var. purpurea Fosberg; Gouldia terminalis var. quadrangularis Fosberg; Gouldia terminalis f. rigidifolia Fosberg; Gouldia terminalis f. rigidifolioides Fosberg; Gouldia terminalis f. robusta Fosberg; Gouldia terminalis f. rockii Fosberg; Gouldia terminalis var. rotundifolia Fosberg; Gouldia terminalis f. russii Fosberg; Gouldia terminalis f. sambucina (A.Heller) Fosberg; Gouldia terminalis f. santalifolia Fosberg; Gouldia terminalis f. sclerophylla Fosberg; Gouldia terminalis var. sclerotica Fosberg; Gouldia terminalis var. skottsbergii Fosberg; Gouldia terminalis var. stipulacea (Wawra) Fosberg; Gouldia terminalis f. storeyi Fosberg; Gouldia terminalis var. subcordata Fosberg; Gouldia terminalis f. subpilosa Fosberg; Gouldia terminalis f. suehiroae Fosberg; Gouldia terminalis var. tenuicaulis Fosberg; Gouldia terminalis f. teres Fosberg; Gouldia terminalis var. typica Fosberg; Gouldia terminalis f. violetae Fosberg; Gouldia terminalis f. wailauensis Fosberg; Gouldia terminalis f. waipioensis Fosberg; Gouldia terminalis var. wawrana Fosberg; Gouldia wawrana (Fosberg) O.Deg. & I.Deg.; Hedyotis chamissoniana Steud.; Hedyotis terminalis (Hook. & Arn.) W.L.Wagner & D.R.Herbst; Kadua affinis DC.; Petesia coriacea Hook. & Arn.; Petesia terminalis Hook. & Arn.

= Kadua affinis =

Species of plant

Kadua affinis, the manono or variable starviolet, is a species of flowering plant in the family Rubiaceae, native to the Hawaiian Islands. It is a highly variable plant, with a variety of growth forms including liana, sprawling shrub, shrub, and tree, and yellowish-green to purplish flowers, which goes a long way towards explaining its 200 synonyms.
