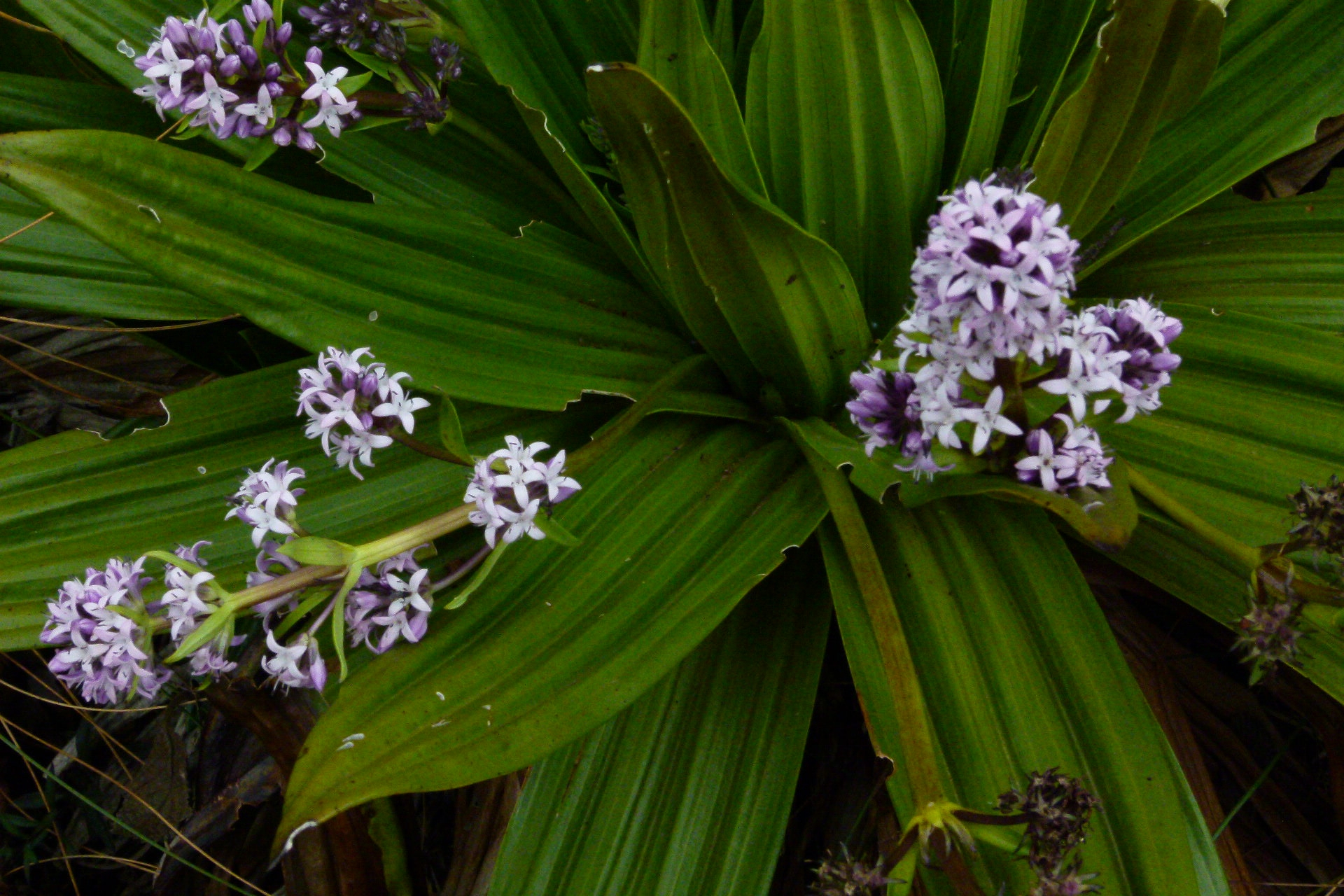

Scientific classification
- Kingdom: Plantae
- Clade: Tracheophytes
- Clade: Angiosperms
- Clade: Eudicots
- Clade: Asterids
- Order: Gentianales
- Family: Rubiaceae
- Genus: Hedyotis
- Species: H. verticillaris

Binomial name
- Hedyotis verticillaris Wall. ex Wight & Arn.

Synonyms
- Pleiocraterium verticillare (Wall. ex Wight & Arn.) Bremek.

= Hedyotis verticillaris =

Species of plant

Hedyotis verticillaris is a plant belonging to the family Rubiaceae that is endemic to the higher altitude grasslands of the Nilgiris in southern India. Unlike many others members of the genus the stems of this species are underground and the leaves appear close to the ground forming rosettes and usually hold some water at the centre of the whorl of leaves. The flowers are produced on a stalk.

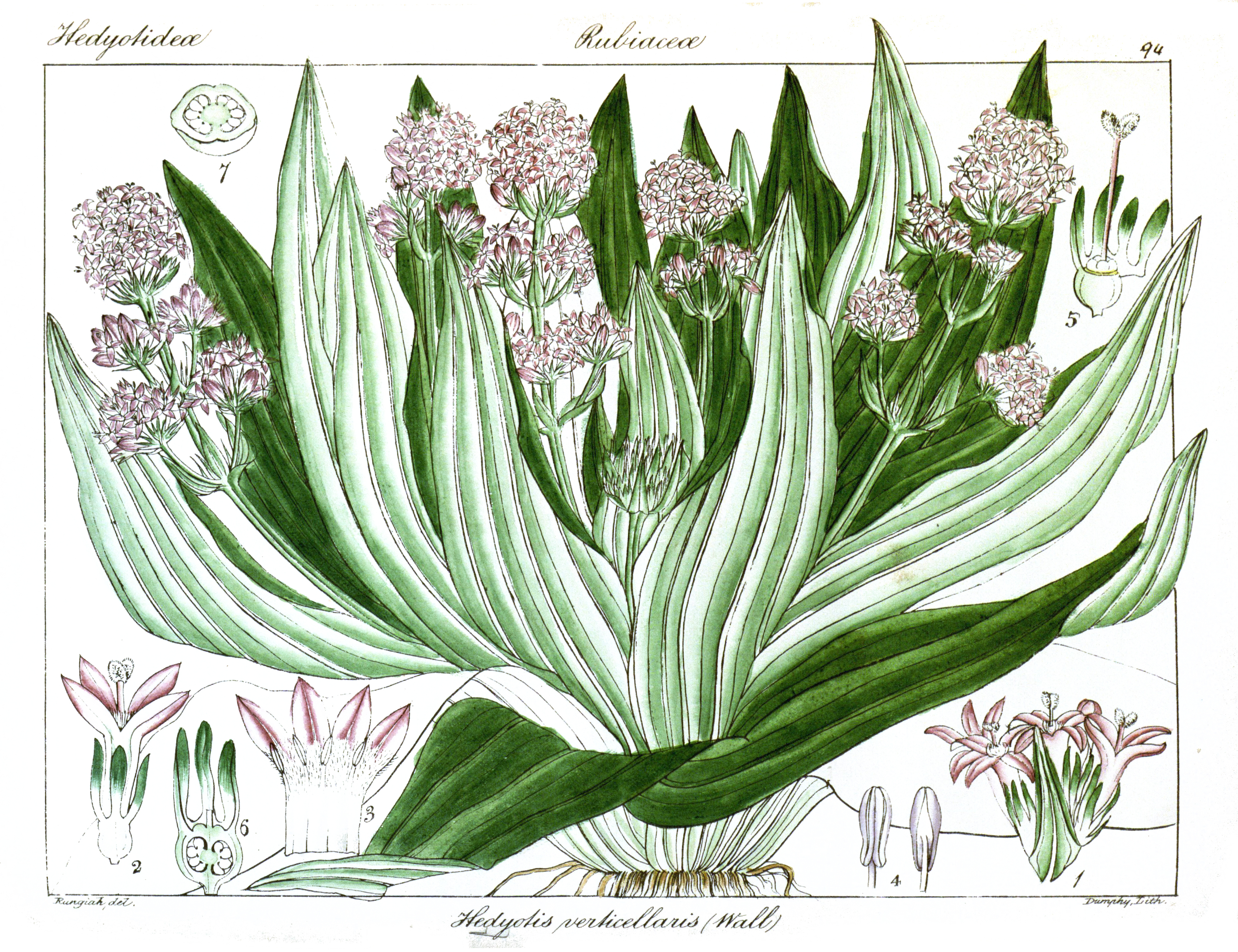

The species has been sometimes placed under the genus Pleiocraterium as P. verticillare along with the species, P. plantaginifolium (Arn.) Bremek. from Sri Lanka, P. sumatranum Bremek. and P. gentianifolium Bremek., both of Sumatra. Molecular phylogenetic studies however have found this genus to nest within other representatives of the genus Hedyotis giving little support for a separate genus.
