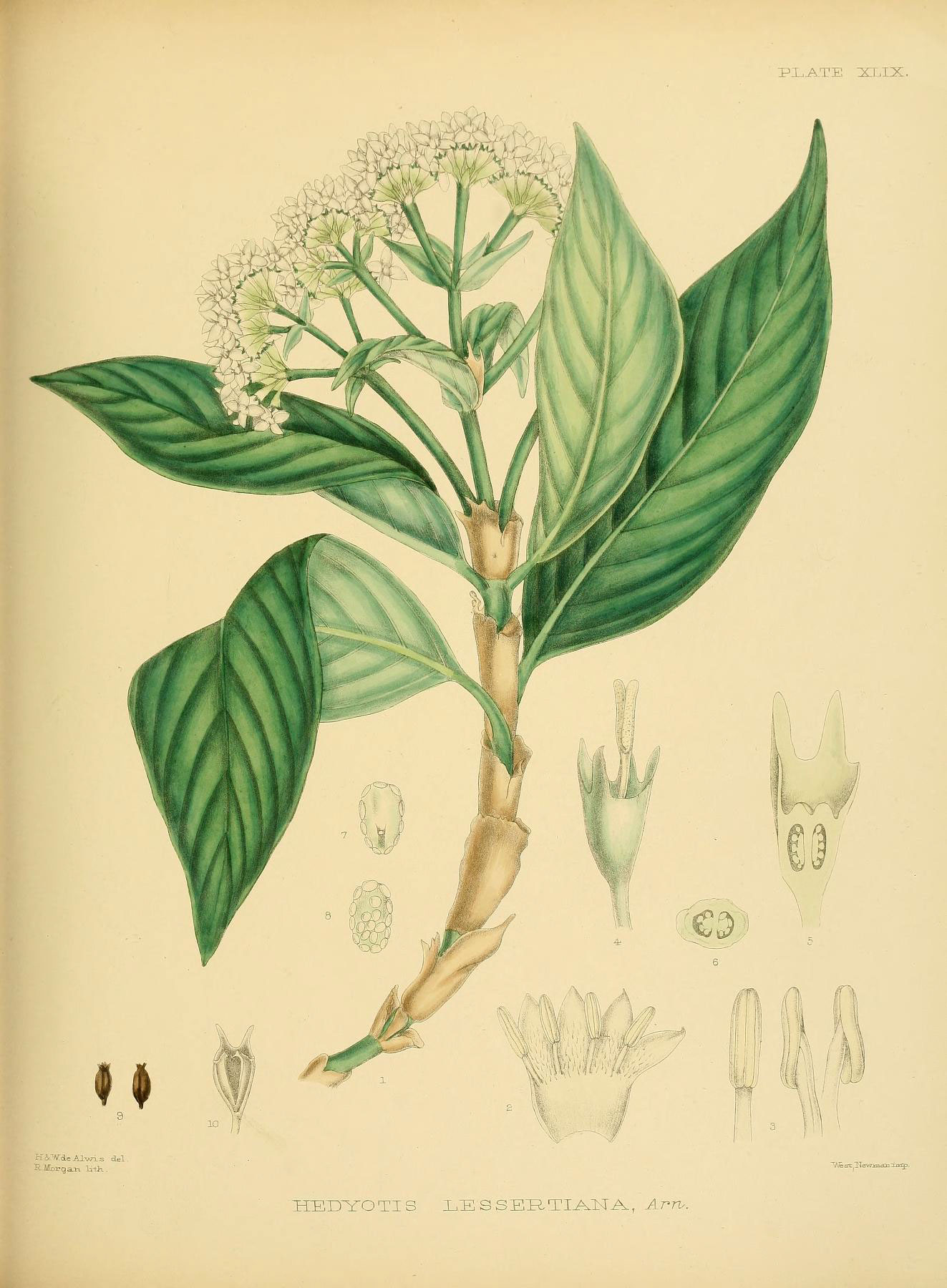

Scientific classification
- Kingdom: Plantae
- Clade: Tracheophytes
- Clade: Angiosperms
- Clade: Eudicots
- Clade: Asterids
- Order: Gentianales
- Family: Rubiaceae
- Genus: Hedyotis
- Species: H. lessertiana

Binomial name
- Hedyotis lessertiana Arn.

= Hedyotis lessertiana =

Species of plant

Hedyotis lessertiana is a species of flowering plant in the family Rubiaceae, endemic to Sri Lanka.
