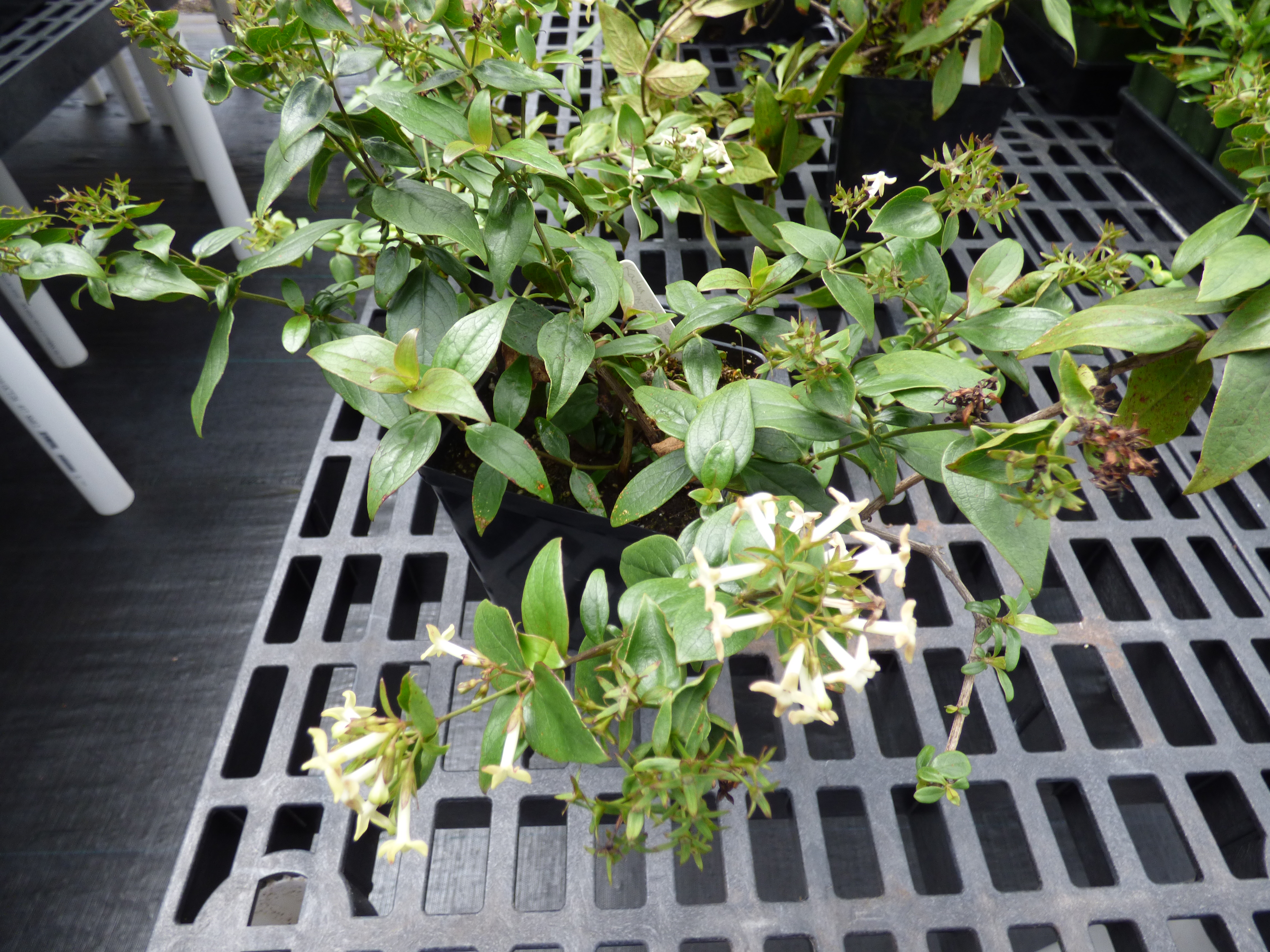

Scientific classification
- Kingdom: Plantae
- Clade: Tracheophytes
- Clade: Angiosperms
- Clade: Eudicots
- Clade: Asterids
- Order: Gentianales
- Family: Rubiaceae
- Genus: Kadua
- Species: K. cordata

Binomial name
- Kadua cordata Cham. & Schltdl.

Synonyms
- Hedyotis schlechtendahliana

= Kadua cordata =

Species of plant

Kadua cordata (formerly Hedyotis schlechtendahliana) is a species of flowering plant in the coffee family known by the common name kopa. It is endemic to Hawaii.

There are at least two varieties of the species. One, variety remyi, is a federally listed endangered species in the United States. It is known only from the island of Lanai. As of 2018, one individual, a seedling, is known to exist in the wild. The U.S. Fish and Wildlife Service had reported, in its previous review in 2014, the existence of two individuals. Some specimens of the plant are kept at the National Tropical Botanic Garden on Kauai.
