= Merimnetria compsodelta =

Scientific classification
- Domain: Eukaryota
- Kingdom: Animalia
- Phylum: Arthropoda
- Class: Insecta
- Order: Lepidoptera
- Family: Gelechiidae
- Genus: Merimnetria
- Species: M. compsodelta

Binomial name
- Merimnetria compsodelta (Meyrick, 1928)

Synonyms
- Merimnetria (Aristoteliodes) compsodelta; Aristotelia compsodelta Meyrick, 1928

Species of insect

Merimnetria compsodelta is a moth of the family Gelechiidae. It was first described by Edward Meyrick in 1928. It is endemic to the Hawaiian island of Oahu.

The larvae feed on Kadua acuminata capsules.
