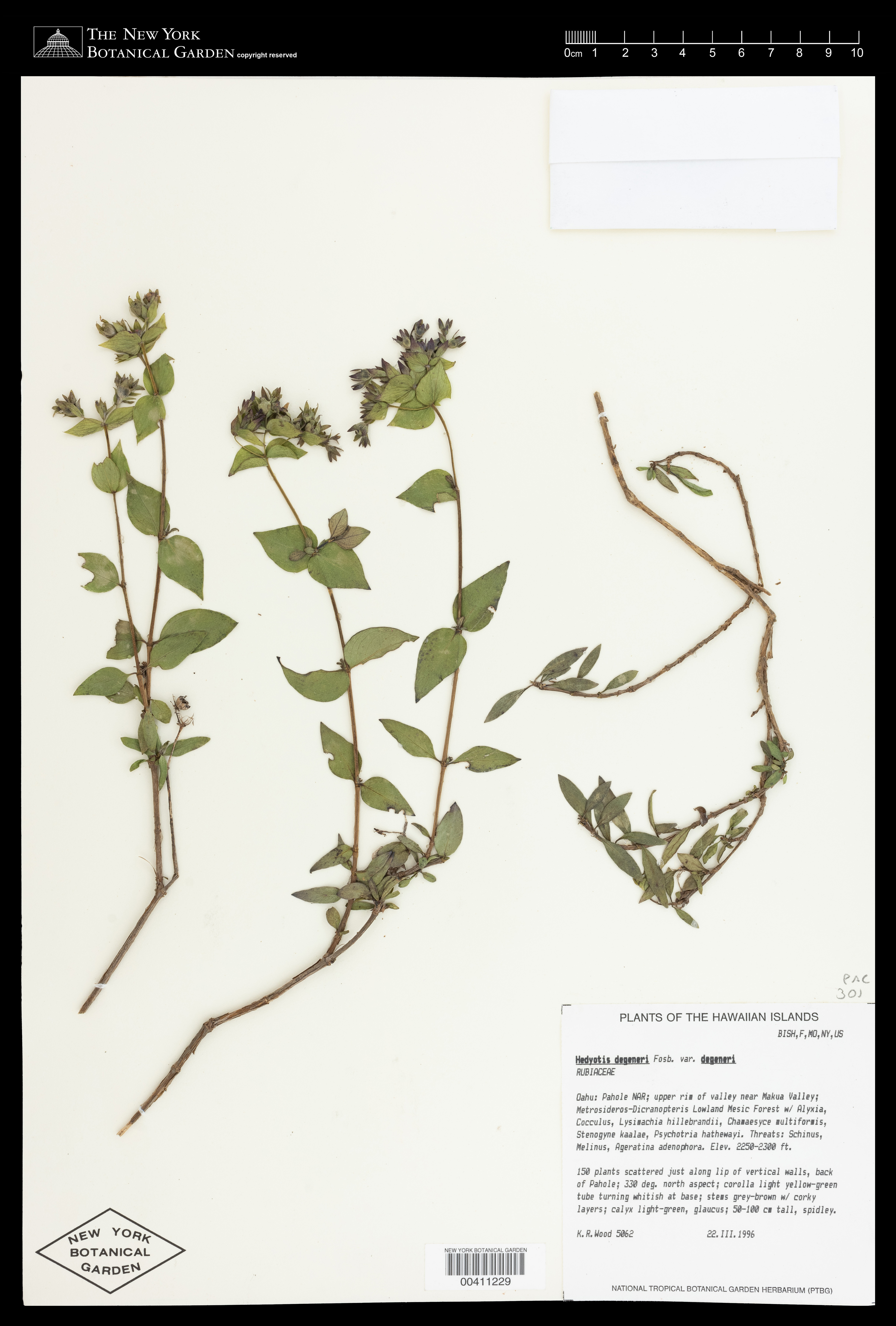

Conservation status
- Critically Imperiled (NatureServe)

Scientific classification
- Kingdom: Plantae
- Clade: Tracheophytes
- Clade: Angiosperms
- Clade: Eudicots
- Clade: Asterids
- Order: Gentianales
- Family: Rubiaceae
- Genus: Kadua
- Species: K. degeneri

Binomial name
- Kadua degeneri Fosberg

Synonyms
- Hedyotis degeneri

= Kadua degeneri =

Species of plant

Kadua degeneri (formerly Hedyotis degeneri) is a rare species of flowering plant in the coffee family known by the common names Waianae Range starviolet and Degener's bluet. It is endemic to Hawaii, where it is known only from the island of Oahu. There are four known populations totalling 370 individuals. It is a federally listed endangered species of the United States.

This is a branching shrub with clusters of flowers. The plant is limited to the Waianae Range on Oahu. It grows on cliffs and ridges in forested mountain habitat. The main threat to its existence is the degradation and destruction of its habitat by feral ungulates such as pigs. The animals have been a vector for the introduction of alien plant species, which compete with native flora.
