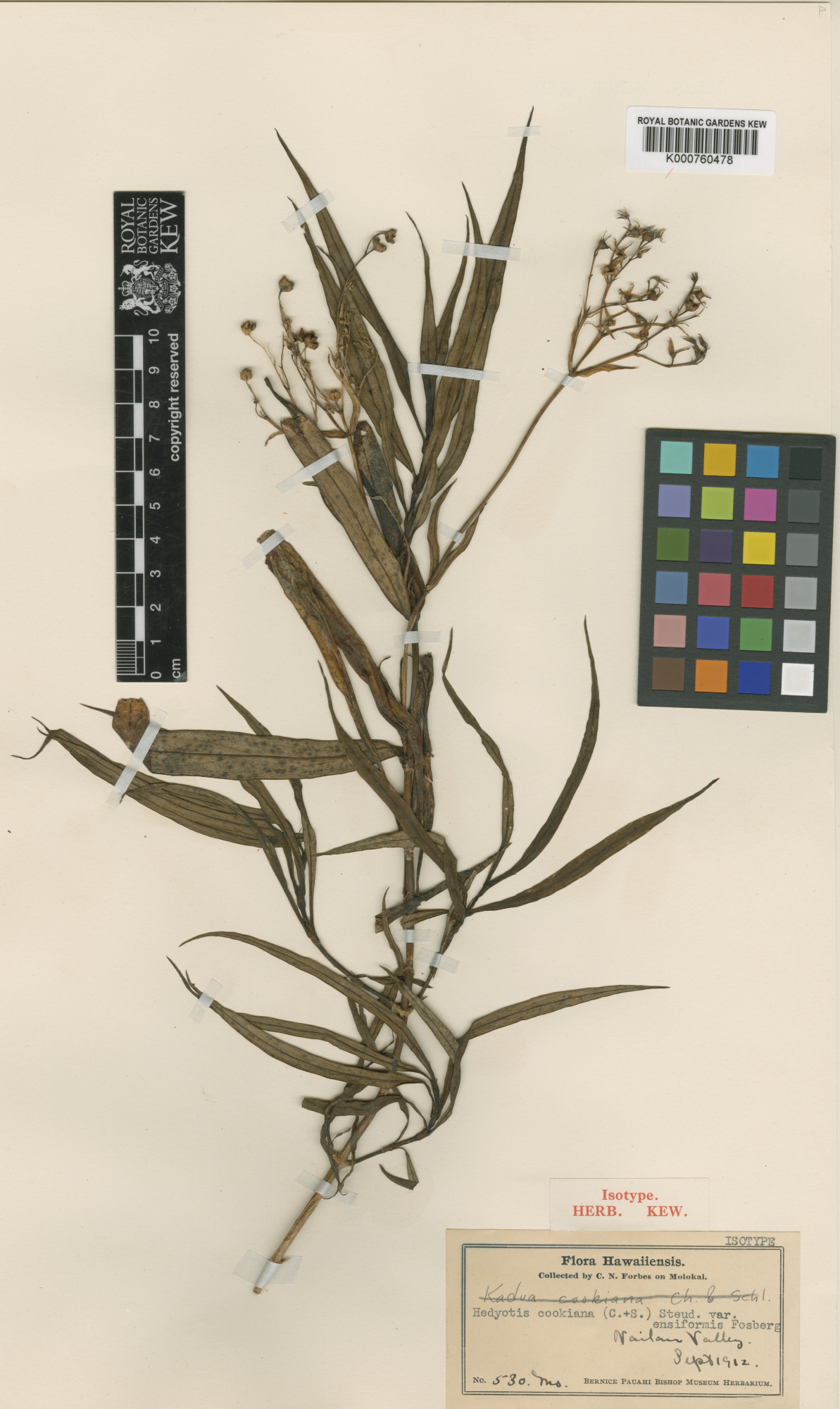

Conservation status
- Critically Imperiled (NatureServe)

Scientific classification
- Kingdom: Plantae
- Clade: Tracheophytes
- Clade: Angiosperms
- Clade: Eudicots
- Clade: Asterids
- Order: Gentianales
- Family: Rubiaceae
- Genus: Kadua
- Species: K. cookiana

Binomial name
- Kadua cookiana Cham. & Schltdl.

Synonyms
- Hedyotis cookiana

= Kadua cookiana =

Species of plant

Kadua cookiana (formerly Hedyotis cookiana) is a rare species of flowering plant in the coffee family known by the common names 'awiwi and Cook's bluet. It is endemic to Hawaii, where it is known only from Kauai, having been extirpated from Molokai and Hawaii. It is a federally listed endangered species of the United States.

Today there are two populations of the plant in the Hanakoa and Waiahuakua Valleys on the Nā Pali Coast of Kauai, with a total global population of no more than 122 individuals. The plant grows next to flowing water, particularly waterfalls, where it grows from cracks in basalt walls next to the falling water. Other plants in the habitat include ahinahina (Artemisia australis), kookoolau (Bidens forbesii, akoko (Chamaesyce celastroides var. hanapepensis), kikawaio (Christella cyatheoides), 'uiwi (Kadua elatior), and uki (Machaerina angustifolia).

This is a small shrub with many short branches up to 20 centimeters long and lined with narrow leaves. It bears white flowers. It is gynodioecious, with an individual plant bearing either bisexual or all female flowers.

Threats to this rare species include habitat damage and destruction by feral pigs and introduced plant species. Plants may be lost in floods, hurricanes, and landslides.
