= Merimnetria epermeniella =

Scientific classification
- Domain: Eukaryota
- Kingdom: Animalia
- Phylum: Arthropoda
- Class: Insecta
- Order: Lepidoptera
- Family: Gelechiidae
- Genus: Merimnetria
- Species: M. epermeniella

Binomial name
- Merimnetria epermeniella (Walsingham, 1907)

Synonyms
- Merimnetria (Aristoteliodes) epermeniella; Aristotelia epermeniella Walsingham, 1907

Species of moth

Merimnetria epermeniella is a moth of the family Gelechiidae. It was first described by Lord Walsingham in 1907. It is endemic to the Hawaiian island of Kauai.

The wingspan is about 16 mm. The forewings are pale fawn ocherous, sprinkled and shaded with rust brown and fuscous, the latter predominating in three sprinkled dorsal patches below the fold and slightly indicated along the middle of the costa. The former prevailing, in a short basal patch above the fold, in a strong outwardly oblique shade from the costa at one-fourth, reaching to the fold on the outer edge of an ill-defined oblique fascia of the paler ground color and thence in mottled sprinkling over the remaining wing surface to the apex. The hindwings are grayish.
