= Merimnetria ichthyochroa =

Scientific classification
- Domain: Eukaryota
- Kingdom: Animalia
- Phylum: Arthropoda
- Class: Insecta
- Order: Lepidoptera
- Family: Gelechiidae
- Genus: Merimnetria
- Species: M. ichthyochroa

Binomial name
- Merimnetria ichthyochroa (Walsingham, 1907)

Synonyms
- Merimnetria (Aristoteliodes) ichthyochroa; Aristotelia ichthyochroa Walsingham, 1907

Species of moth

Merimnetria ichthyochroa is a moth in the family Gelechiidae. It was first described by Lord Walsingham in 1907. It is endemic to the Hawaiian island of Molokai.

The wingspan is about 16 mm. The forewings are rather shining, whitish cinereous (ash gray), but showing a slight ferruginous reflection in certain lights. There is a broad triangular ferruginous costal blotch, commencing at one-fourth, descends outward to the middle of the fold and is then diffused upward to the commencement of the costal cilia, a few dark ferruginous scales about the apex and termen precede the leaden-gray cilia which have also in some lights a reddish-brown reflection. The hindwings are dark brownish gray.
