= Merimnetria straussiella =

Scientific classification
- Domain: Eukaryota
- Kingdom: Animalia
- Phylum: Arthropoda
- Class: Insecta
- Order: Lepidoptera
- Family: Gelechiidae
- Genus: Merimnetria
- Species: M. straussiella

Binomial name
- Merimnetria straussiella (Swezey, 1953)

Synonyms
- Aristotelia straussiella Swezey, 1953

Species of moth

Merimnetria straussiella is a moth of the family Gelechiidae. It was first described by Otto Herman Swezey in 1953. It is endemic to the Hawaiian island of Oahu.

The larvae feed on Straussia kaduana and Straussia mariniana. They mine the leaves of their host plant.
