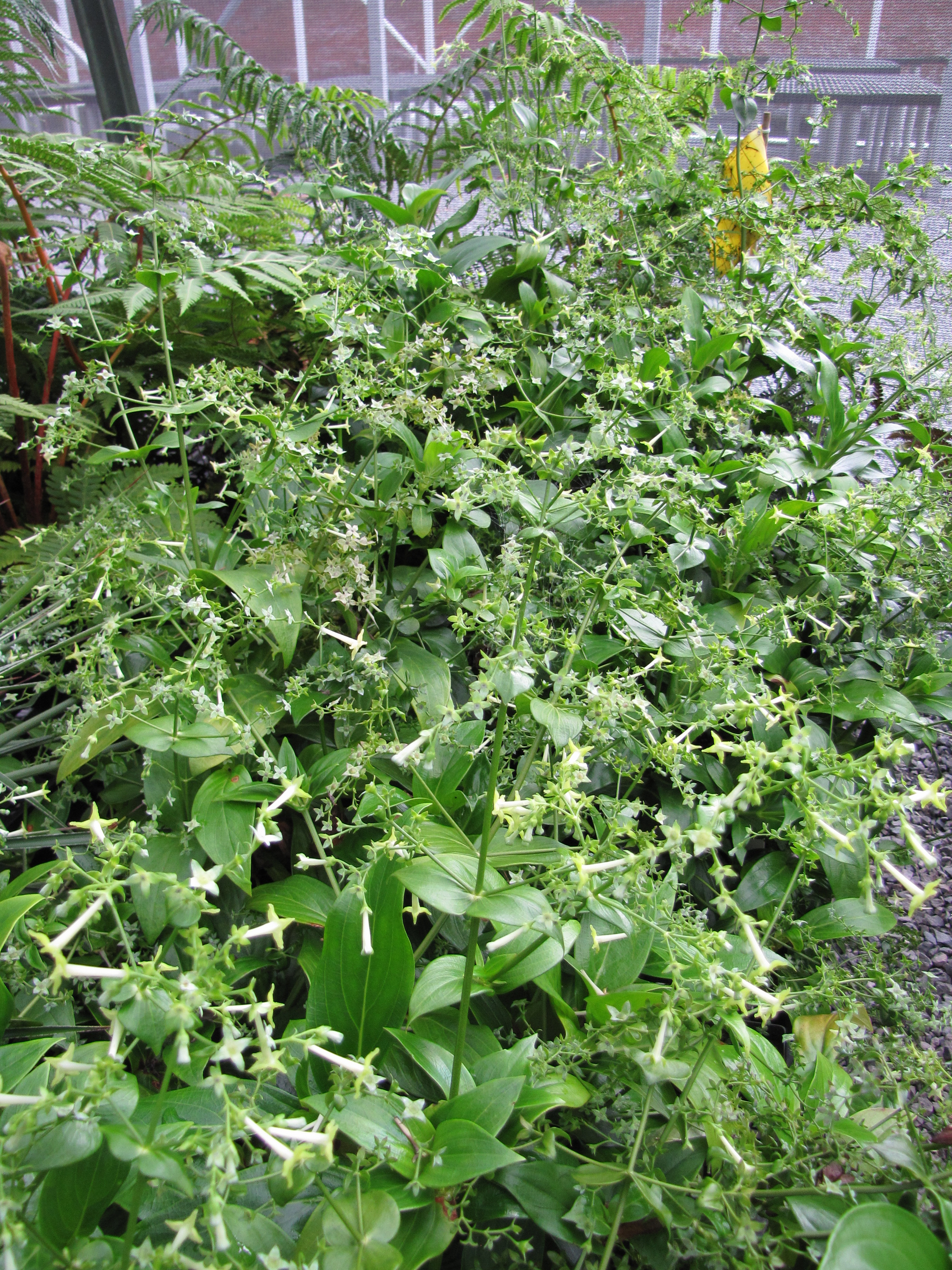

Conservation status
- Critically Endangered (IUCN 3.1)

- Critically Imperiled (NatureServe)

Scientific classification
- Kingdom: Plantae
- Clade: Tracheophytes
- Clade: Angiosperms
- Clade: Eudicots
- Clade: Asterids
- Order: Gentianales
- Family: Rubiaceae
- Genus: Kadua
- Species: K. laxiflora

Binomial name
- Kadua laxiflora H.Mann

Synonyms
- Homotypic Synonyms: Hedyotis mannii Fosberg; Hedyotis mannii var. laxiflora (H.Mann) Fosberg; Heterotypic Synonyms: Hedyotis mannii var. cuspidata Fosberg; Hedyotis mannii var. munroi Fosberg; Hedyotis mannii var. scaposa Fosberg; Hedyotis molokaiensis Fosberg; Hedyotis thyrsoidea Fosberg; Hedyotis thyrsoidea var. hillebrandii Fosberg

= Kadua laxiflora =

Species of plant

Kadua laxiflora is a species of rare flowering plant in the family Rubiaceae. It is sometimes referred to by the common names Mann's bluet and Hawaiian pilo. It is endemic to Hawaii, where it is known from Molokai, Lanai, and Maui. It is known to exist at four locations for a global population of under 100 plants. It is a federally listed endangered species of the United States.

This is a subshrub with clusters of greenish white flowers. Threats to its existence include non-native plant species.
