= Merimnetria notata =

Scientific classification
- Domain: Eukaryota
- Kingdom: Animalia
- Phylum: Arthropoda
- Class: Insecta
- Order: Lepidoptera
- Family: Gelechiidae
- Genus: Merimnetria
- Species: M. notata

Binomial name
- Merimnetria notata (Walsingham, 1907)

Synonyms
- Merimnetria (Aristoteliodes) notata; Aristotelia notata Walsingham, 1907

Species of moth

Merimnetria notata is a moth of the family Gelechiidae. It was first described by Lord Walsingham in 1907. It is endemic to the Hawaiian island of Molokai.

The wingspan is about 14 mm. The forewings are whitish ocherous with a small blackish spot at the extreme base of the costa, a larger diffused spot on the fold near its base, a triangular costal patch before the middle, its apex reaching to the fold, a patch at the end of the cell and a smaller one on the costa before the apex with a series of almost connected blackish spots in the whitish-ocherous terminal and costal cilia. The hindwings are pale rosy gray.
