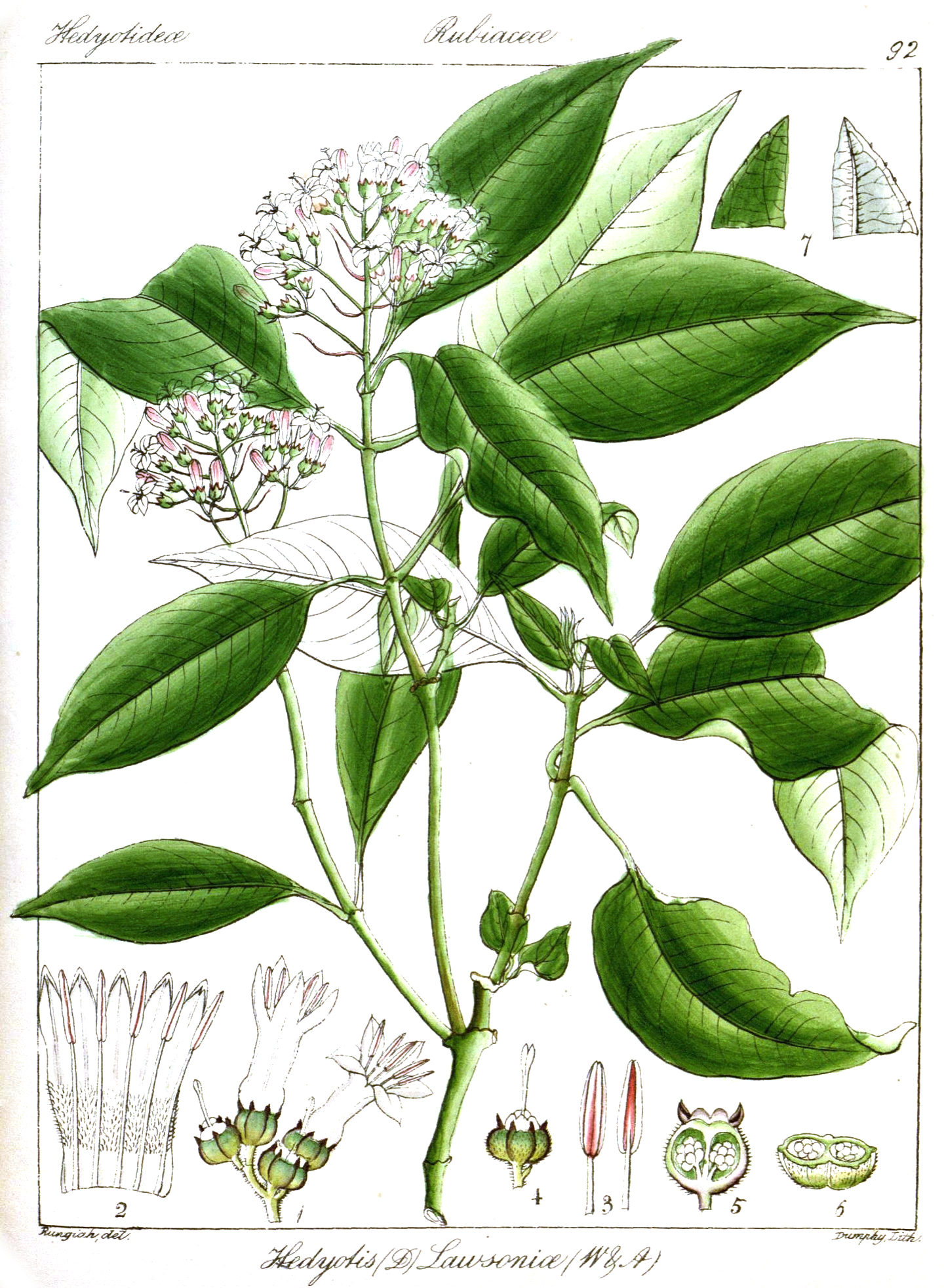

Scientific classification
- Kingdom: Plantae
- Clade: Tracheophytes
- Clade: Angiosperms
- Clade: Eudicots
- Clade: Asterids
- Order: Gentianales
- Family: Rubiaceae
- Genus: Hedyotis
- Species: H. lawsoniae

Binomial name
- Hedyotis lawsoniae Wight & Arn.

= Hedyotis lawsoniae =

Species of plant

Hedyotis lawsoniae is a species of flowering plant in the family Rubiaceae that is endemic to Sri Lanka.

== Uses ==
This species is ornamental.
