= Merimnetria maculaticornis =

Scientific classification
- Domain: Eukaryota
- Kingdom: Animalia
- Phylum: Arthropoda
- Class: Insecta
- Order: Lepidoptera
- Family: Gelechiidae
- Genus: Merimnetria
- Species: M. maculaticornis

Binomial name
- Merimnetria maculaticornis (Walsingham, 1907)

Synonyms
- Merimnetria (Aristoteliodes) maculaticornis; Aristotelia maculaticornis Walsingham, 1907

Species of moth

Merimnetria maculaticornis is a moth of the family Gelechiidae. It was first described by Lord Walsingham in 1907. It is endemic to the island of Hawaii.

The wingspan is about 20 mm. The forewings are white, with brownish-fuscous markings, all more or less broken up by the white ground color. There is a basal patch, broader on the dorsum than on the costa, a triangular costal patch before the middle, reaching to the fold, and an inverted costal patch before the apex reaching to the end of the cell. This points towards a few fuscous scales on the dorsum and is preceded on the costa by a similar group, others occurring about the apex and termen. The hindwings are pale cinereous (ash gray).
