= Merimnetria mendax =

Scientific classification
- Domain: Eukaryota
- Kingdom: Animalia
- Phylum: Arthropoda
- Class: Insecta
- Order: Lepidoptera
- Family: Gelechiidae
- Genus: Merimnetria
- Species: M. mendax

Binomial name
- Merimnetria mendax (Walsingham, 1907)

Synonyms
- Merimnetria (Aristoteliodes) mendax; Aristotelia mendax Walsingham, 1907

Species of moth

Merimnetria mendax is a moth of the family Gelechiidae. It was first described by Lord Walsingham in 1907. It is endemic to the Hawaiian island of Kauai.

The wingspan is 10–12 mm. The forewings are pale fawn ocherous, profusely sprinkled and minutely mottled with fawn brown, almost obliterating the paler ground color, a few blackish specks along the costa, especially before the middle. The hindwings are pale gray.
