= Merimnetria elegantior =

Scientific classification
- Domain: Eukaryota
- Kingdom: Animalia
- Phylum: Arthropoda
- Class: Insecta
- Order: Lepidoptera
- Family: Gelechiidae
- Genus: Merimnetria
- Species: M. elegantior

Binomial name
- Merimnetria elegantior (Walsingham, 1907)

Synonyms
- Merimnetria (Aristoteliodes) elegantior; Aristotelia elegantior Walsingham, 1907

Species of moth

Merimnetria elegantior is a moth of the family Gelechiidae. It was first described by Lord Walsingham in 1907. It is endemic to the island of Oahu and possibly Hawaii.

The wingspan is about 13 mm. The forewings are cinereous (ash gray), slightly suffused with gray along the dorsum and toward the apex. There is a large brown costal blotch before the middle, terminating in a bright ferruginous patch on the fold. This is followed by two spots, one before, the other at the end of the cell, brown on their upper half, bright ferruginous beneath. Some pale cinereous mottling extends around the apex on the costa and termen. The hindwings are grayish.

The larvae feed on the fruit of Kadua macrocarpa.
