= Merimnetria lanaiensis =

Scientific classification
- Domain: Eukaryota
- Kingdom: Animalia
- Phylum: Arthropoda
- Class: Insecta
- Order: Lepidoptera
- Family: Gelechiidae
- Genus: Merimnetria
- Species: M. lanaiensis

Binomial name
- Merimnetria lanaiensis (Walsingham, 1907)

Synonyms
- Merimnetria (Aristoteliodes) lanaiensis; Aristotelia lanaiensis Walsingham, 1907

Species of moth

Merimnetria lanaiensis is a moth of the family Gelechiidae. It was first described by Lord Walsingham in 1907. It is endemic to the Hawaiian island of Lanai.

The wingspan is about 11 mm. The forewings are ashy whitish, sparsely sprinkled with pale brownish fuscous, a small dark fuscous spot at the base of the costa is succeeded by a triangular fuscous costal patch, scarcely before the middle, and a few fuscous scales about the commencement of the costal cilia. The hindwings are ashy gray.
