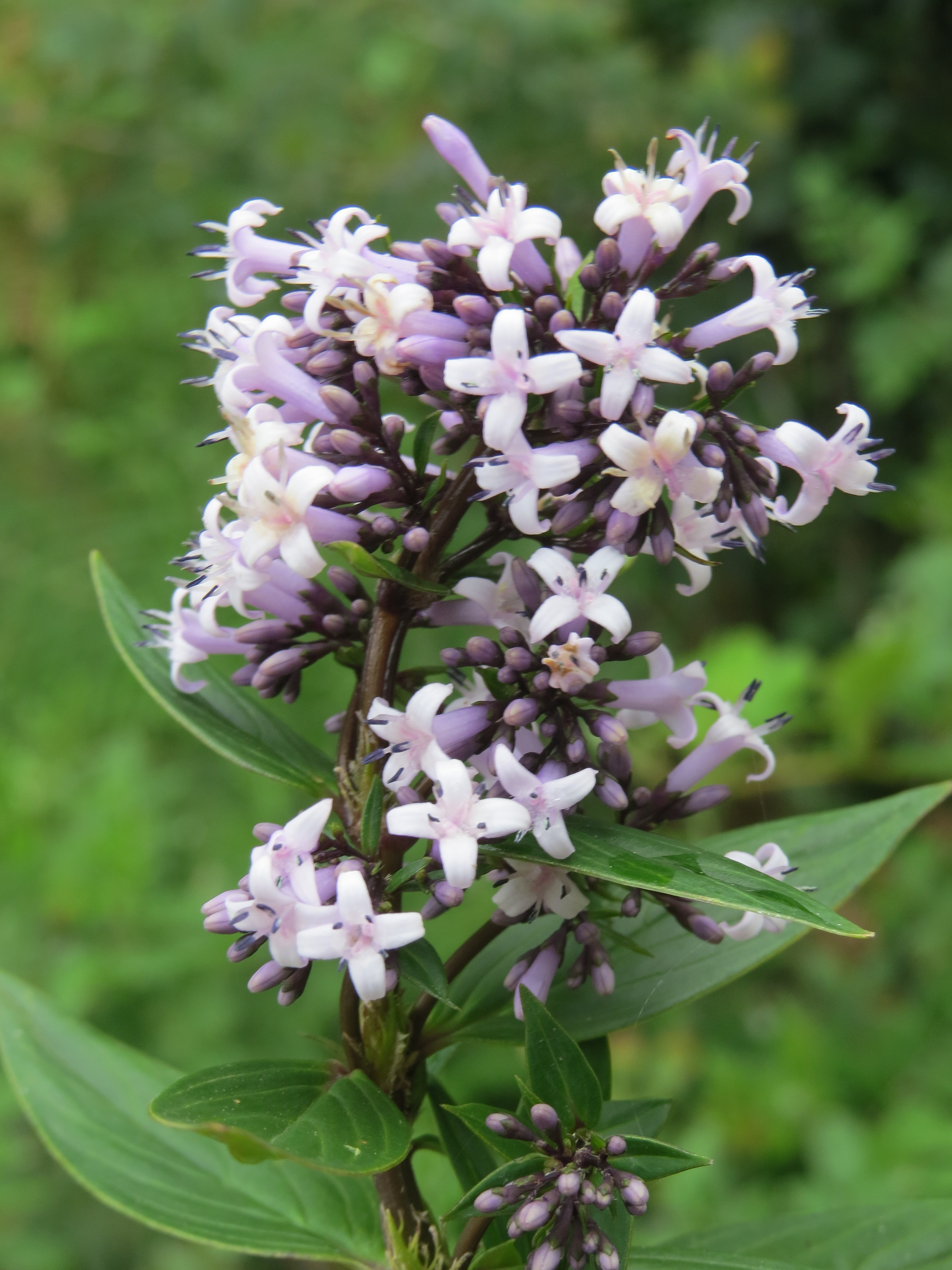

Scientific classification
- Kingdom: Plantae
- Clade: Tracheophytes
- Clade: Angiosperms
- Clade: Eudicots
- Clade: Asterids
- Order: Gentianales
- Family: Rubiaceae
- Genus: Hedyotis
- Species: H. articularis

Binomial name
- Hedyotis articularis R.Br. ex Wight & Arn.

= Hedyotis articularis =

Species of plant

Hedyotis articularis is a species of flowering plant in the family Rubiaceae. It is a subshrub endemic to southwestern India.
