= Merimnetria gratula =

Scientific classification
- Domain: Eukaryota
- Kingdom: Animalia
- Phylum: Arthropoda
- Class: Insecta
- Order: Lepidoptera
- Family: Gelechiidae
- Genus: Merimnetria
- Species: M. gratula

Binomial name
- Merimnetria gratula (Meyrick, 1928)

Synonyms
- Merimnetria (Aristoteliodes) gratula; Aristotelia gratula Meyrick, 1928

Species of insect

Merimnetria gratula is a moth of the family Gelechiidae. It was first described by Edward Meyrick in 1928. It is endemic to the Hawaiian island of Oahu.

The larvae feed on Psychotria kaduana, which is a tree that mainly grows in the mountains of Oahu. They mine the leaves of their host plant.
