= Merimnetria =

Scientific classification
- Domain: Eukaryota
- Kingdom: Animalia
- Phylum: Arthropoda
- Class: Insecta
- Order: Lepidoptera
- Family: Gelechiidae
- Subfamily: Thiotrichinae
- Genus: Merimnetria; Walsingham, 1907

Synonyms
- Aristoteliodes Zimmerman, 1978

Genus of moths

Merimnetria is a genus of moths in the family Gelechiidae. It was first described by Lord Walsingham in 1907. All species are endemic to Hawaii.

== Species ==
- Subgenus Aristoteliodes Zimmerman, 1978
  - Merimnetria arcuata (Walsingham, 1907)
  - Merimnetria compsodelta (Meyrick, 1928)
  - Merimnetria elegantior (Walsingham, 1907)
  - Merimnetria epermeniella (Walsingham, 1907)
  - Merimnetria gigantea (Swezey, 1913)
  - Merimnetria gratula (Meyrick, 1928)
  - Merimnetria homoxyla (Meyrick, 1928)
  - Merimnetria ichthyochroa (Walsingham, 1907)
  - Merimnetria lanaiensis (Walsingham, 1907)
  - Merimnetria maculaticornis (Walsingham, 1907)
  - Merimnetria mendax (Walsingham, 1907)
  - Merimnetria multiformis (Meyrick, 1928)
  - Merimnetria nigriciliella (Walsingham, 1907)
  - Merimnetria notata (Walsingham, 1907)
  - Merimnetria thurifica (Meyrick, 1928)
  - Merimnetria xylospila (Meyrick, 1928)
- Subgenus Merimnetria
  - Merimnetria flaviterminella Walsingham, 1907
  - Merimnetria straussiella (Swezey, 1953)

Furthermore, there are at least three undescribed species.
