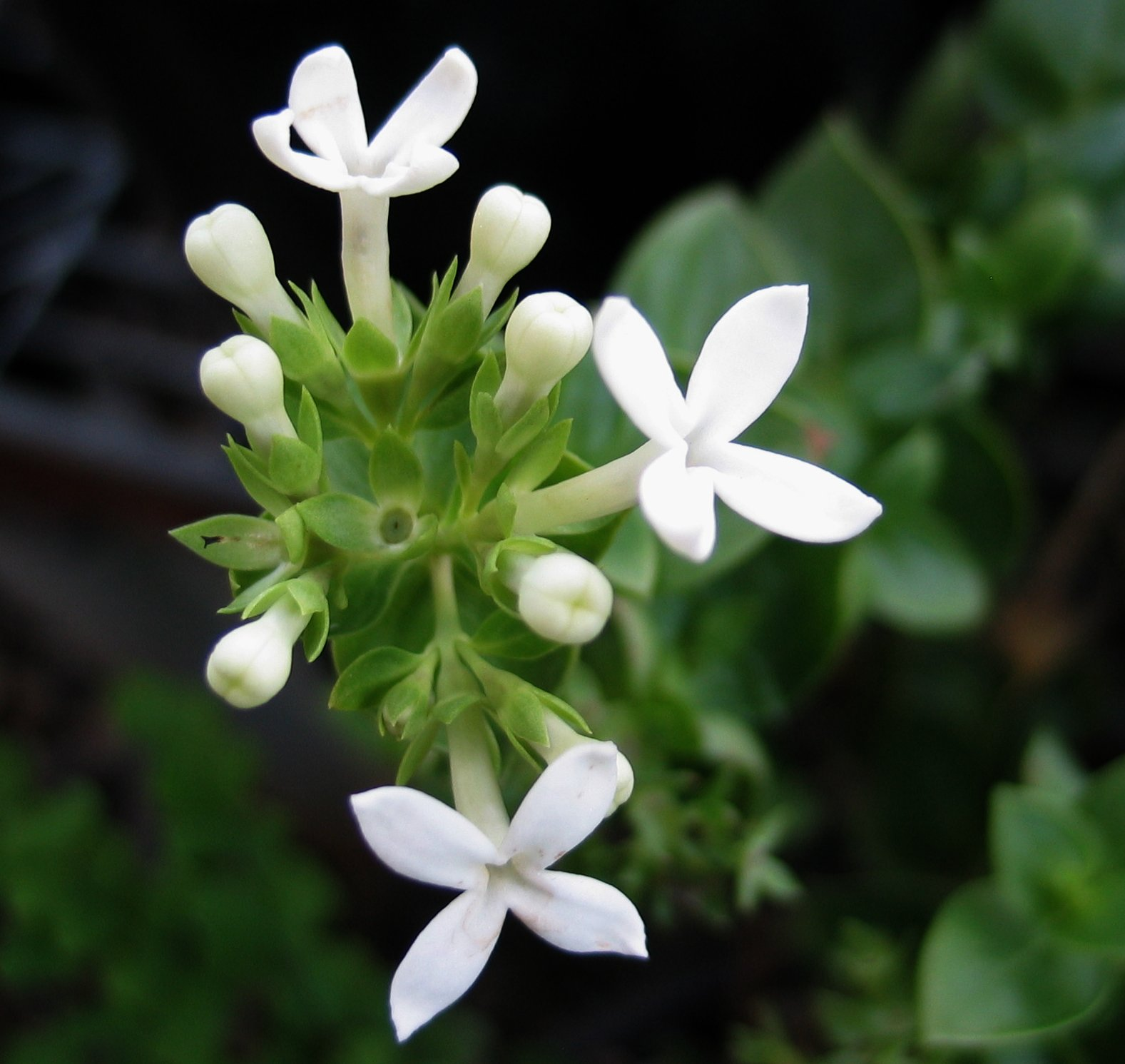

Conservation status
- Critically Imperiled (NatureServe)

Scientific classification
- Kingdom: Plantae
- Clade: Tracheophytes
- Clade: Angiosperms
- Clade: Eudicots
- Clade: Asterids
- Order: Gentianales
- Family: Rubiaceae
- Genus: Kadua
- Species: K. parvula

Binomial name
- Kadua parvula A.Gray

Synonyms
- Hedyotis parvula

= Kadua parvula =

Species of plant

Kadua parvula (formerly Hedyotis parvula) is a rare species of flowering plant in the coffee family known by the common name rockface star-violet. It is endemic to Hawaii, where it is known only from the Waiʻanae Range on the island of Oahu. It is a federally listed endangered species of the United States.

This is a branching shrub growing erect or spreading, the branches reaching 10 to 40 centimeters in length. The lance-shaped or pointed oval leaves are densely spaced on the branches, sometimes overlapping. Each is up to 4 centimeters long by 3 wide and leathery in texture. The flowers may be bisexual or functionally female with fleshy white lobes sometimes tinged pink at the tips. The plants grow on cliffs and ledges in moist areas of the Waiʻanae Range.

There are only two known populations extant. One is located on the Mākua Military Reservation, and the other is at Halona. Together they contain at least 263 individual plants.

Threats to the plant include habitat degradation and destruction by feral pigs and goats and non-native plants such as Ageratina riparia, Erigeron karvinskianus, Grevillea robusta, Melinis minutiflora, Rubus argutus, and Schinus terebinthifolius.
