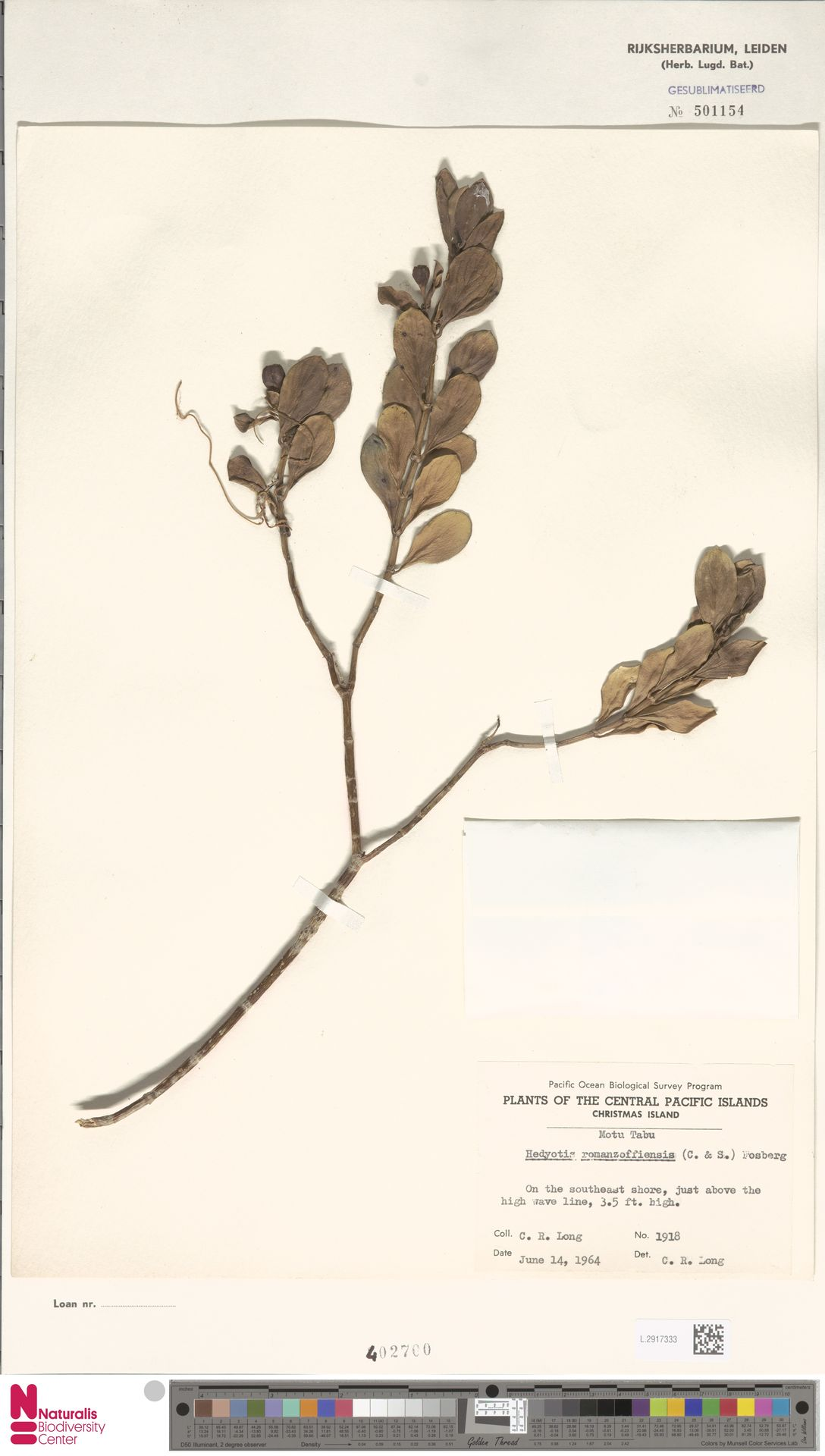

Scientific classification
- Kingdom: Plantae
- Clade: Tracheophytes
- Clade: Angiosperms
- Clade: Eudicots
- Clade: Asterids
- Order: Gentianales
- Family: Rubiaceae
- Genus: Kadua
- Species: K. romanzoffiensis

Binomial name
- Kadua romanzoffiensis Cham. & Schltdl.

= Kadua romanzoffiensis =

Species of plant

Kadua romanzoffiensis is a species of flowering plant in the family Rubiaceae, native to parts of the southwestern Pacific (Niue, Samoa, Tokelau and Manihiki, Tuvalu) and much of the south-central Pacific (the Cook Islands, the Line Islands, the Pitcairn Islands, the Society Islands, the Tuamotus, and the Tubuai Islands).
