= Merimnetria gigantea =

Scientific classification
- Domain: Eukaryota
- Kingdom: Animalia
- Phylum: Arthropoda
- Class: Insecta
- Order: Lepidoptera
- Family: Gelechiidae
- Genus: Merimnetria
- Species: M. gigantea

Binomial name
- Merimnetria gigantea (Swezey, 1913)

Synonyms
- Merimnetria (Aristoteliodes) gigantea; Aristotelia gigantea Swezey, 1913

Species of moth

Merimnetria gigantea is a moth of the family Gelechiidae. It was first described by Otto Swezey in 1913. It is endemic to the island of Hawaii.

This is the largest described species of Merimnetria with a wingspan of about is 28 mm. The forewings are whitish ocherous with a few orange scales at the base. The middle half of the costa is fuscous, bordered irregularly with a streak of ocherous brown. There is a fuscous spot near the middle of the fold, another near the dorsum about midway between this and the anal angle, as well as an orbicular and a discal fuscous dot. A streak of brownish suffusion is found in the dorsal half of the cell, extending to the termen, gradually widened to the apex. The hindwings are pale brownish ocherous.
