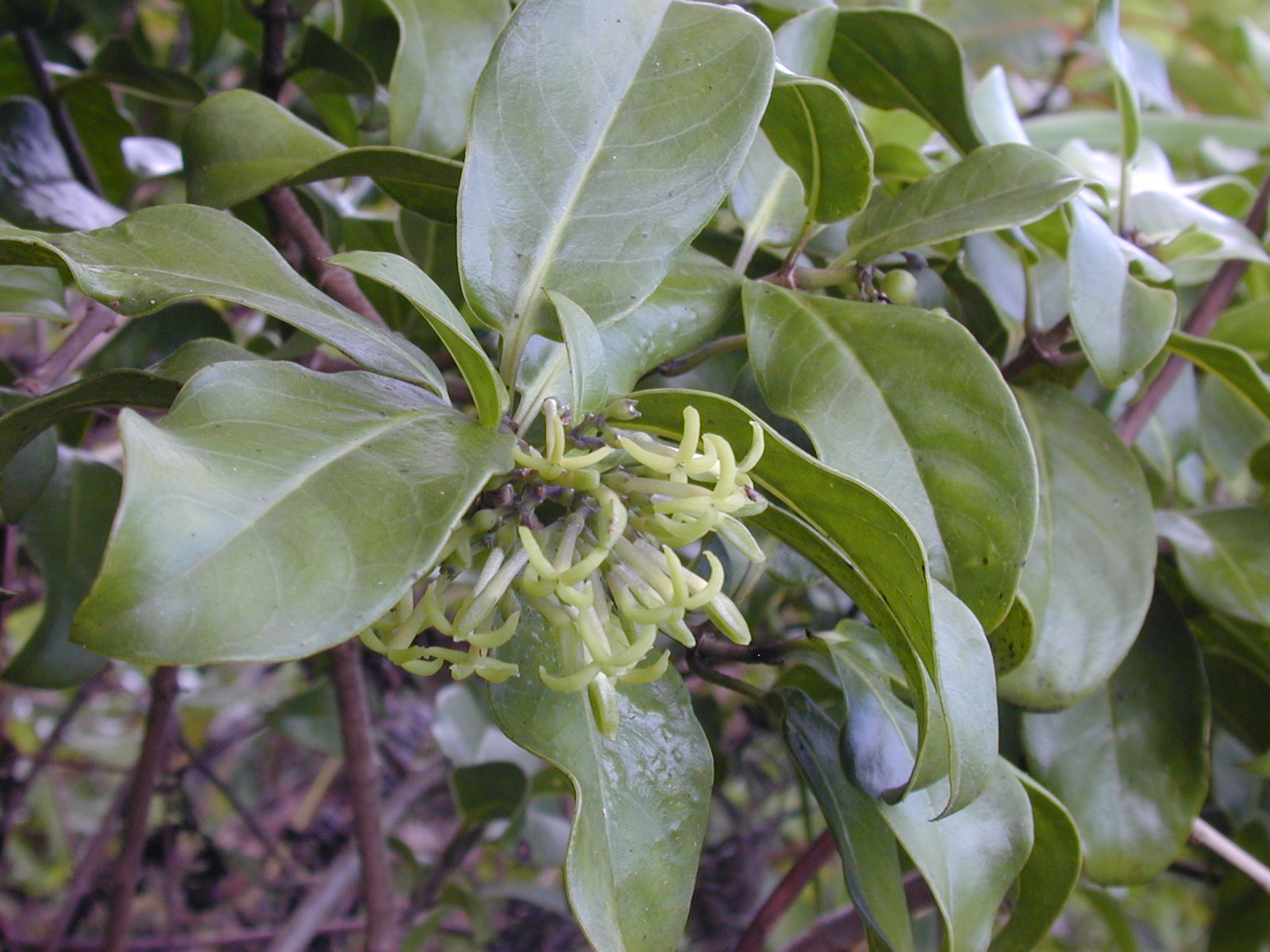
- Kadua affinis

Scientific classification
- Kingdom: Plantae
- Clade: Tracheophytes
- Clade: Angiosperms
- Clade: Eudicots
- Clade: Asterids
- Order: Gentianales
- Family: Rubiaceae
- Subfamily: Rubioideae
- Tribe: Spermacoceae
- Genus: Kadua; Cham. & Schltdl.

Type species
- Kadua acuminata Cham. & Schltdl.

Species
- ~ 29 species, see text

= Kadua =

Genus of flowering plants

Kadua is a genus of flowering plants in the family Rubiaceae. It comprises 29 species, all restricted to Polynesia. Twenty-two of these are endemic to the Hawaiian Islands. Some of the species are common at high elevation. Others are single-island endemics or very rare, and a few are probably extinct. Kadua affinis is widely distributed in Hawaii and is polymorphic. The type species for the genus is Kadua acuminata.

Kadua was formerly included in a broadly defined and polyphyletic Hedyotis, which encompassed, in addition to Kadua, species now placed in Oldenlandia, Oldenlandiopsis, Houstonia, and other genera. Hedyotis is now circumscribed more narrowly.

== Species ==
In the following list, Kadua haupuensis is added to the species listed by Edward E. Terrell et alii.

- Kadua acuminata Cham. & Schltdl.
- Kadua affinis (A.Gray) W.L.Wagner & Lorence
- Kadua axillaris (Wawra) W.L.Wagner & Lorence
- Kadua centranthoides Hook. & Arn.
- Kadua cookiana Cham. & Schltdl.
- Kadua cordata Cham. & Schltdl.
- Kadua coriacea (Sm.) W.L.Wagner & Lorence
- Kadua degeneri (Fosberg) W.L.Wagner & Lorence
- Kadua elatior (H.Mann) W.L.Wagner & Lorence
- Kadua fluviatilis C.N.Forbes
- Kadua flynnii (W.L.Wagner & Lorence) W.L.Wagner & Lorence
- Kadua foggiana (Fosberg) W.L.Wagner & Lorence
- Kadua foliosa Hillebr.
- Kadua formosa Hillebr.
- Kadua fosbergii W.L.Wagner & D.R.Herbst
- Kadua grantii (Fosberg) W.L.Wagner & Lorence
- Kadua haupuensis Lorence & W.L.Wagner
- Kadua knudsenii Hillebr.
- Kadua laxiflora H.Mann
- Kadua littoralis Hillebr.
- Kadua lucei (Lorence & J.Florence) W.L.Wagner & Lorence
- Kadua nukuhivensis (J.Florence & Lorence) W.L.Wagner & Lorence
- Kadua parvula A.Gray
- Kadua raiateensis J.W.Moore
- Kadua rapensis F.Br.
- Kadua romanzoffiensis Cham. & Schltdl.
- Kadua st-johnii (B.C.Stone & Lane) W.L.Wagner & Lorence
- Kadua tahuatensis (Lorence & J.Florence) W.L.Wagner & Lorence
- Kadua tryblium D.R.Herbst & W.L.Wagner

== History ==
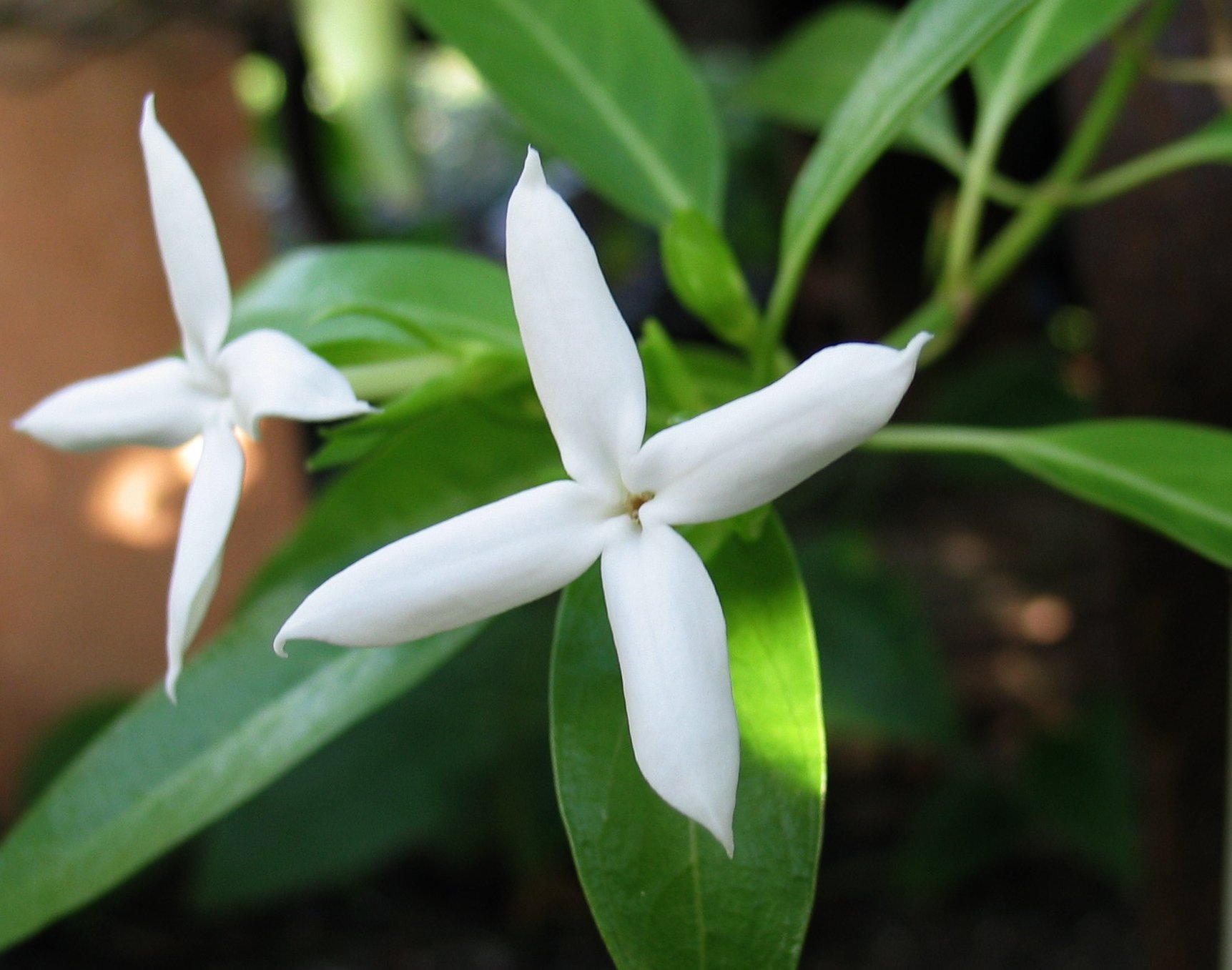
Kadua fluviatilis, endemic to the Hawaiian Islands, endangered, Oʻahu (Cultivated)

The genus Kadua was erected in 1829 by Adelbert von Chamisso and Diederich von Schlechtendal. They named it for Kadu, a native of Ulea, one of the Marshall Islands. Kadu was a friend of von Chamisso and provided valuable assistance to the 1815–1818 expedition led by Otto von Kotzebue. The generic name Kadua fell into disuse in the 20th century, because most authors considered it to be a synonym of Hedyotis. In 1999, twenty species of Kadua were described as species of Hedyotis in a Flora of Hawaii. Kadua flynnii was described in 1998, and Kadua haupuensis in 2010. Kadua was resurrected in 2005. This taxonomic change was corroborated by molecular phylogenetic studies of the tribe Spermacoceae in 2008 and 2009.

== Phylogeny ==
The following phylogenetic tree is partly based on a phylogenetic analysis of DNA sequences, and partly inferred from the classification followed in a 2005 paper.

- Kadua
  - - Kadua tryblium
    - - Kadua affinis
      - - Kadua fosbergii
        - Kadua axillaris
  - - - Kadua acuminata
      - Kadua fluviatilis
    - - - - Kadua rapensis
          - Kadua coriacea
        - - Kadua formosa
          - - Kadua knudsenii
            - Kadua foggiana
            - Kadua centranthoides
      - - Kadua parvula
        - - - Kadua degeneri
            - - Kadua littoralis
              - Kadua laxiflora
          - - Kadua cordata
            - - Kadua elatior
              - - Kadua flynnii
                - Kadua haupuensis
