= Parainvolucrella =

Scientific classification
- Kingdom: Plantae
- Clade: Tracheophytes
- Clade: Angiosperms
- Clade: Eudicots
- Clade: Asterids
- Order: Gentianales
- Family: Rubiaceae
- Genus: Parainvolucrella; R.J.Wang (2021)
- Species: P. scabra

Binomial name
- Parainvolucrella scabra (Wall. ex Kurz) M.D.Yuan & R.J.Wang

Synonyms
- Hedyotis scabra Wall. ex Kurz (1877); Oldenlandia scabra (Wall. ex Kurz) Kuntze (1891); Scleromitrion scabrum (Wall. ex Kurz) Neupane & N.Wikstr. (2015)

Genus of flowering plants

Parainvolucrella scabra is a species of flowering plant in the family Rubiaceae. It is the sole species in genus Parainvolucrella. It is an annual or perennial native to the eastern Indian subcontinent and Indochina, ranging from Arunachal Pradesh to Bangladesh, Myanmar, Thailand, Laos, and Vietnam.
