= Hedyotis =

Scientific classification
- Kingdom: Plantae
- Clade: Embryophytes
- Clade: Tracheophytes
- Clade: Angiosperms
- Clade: Eudicots
- Clade: Asterids
- Order: Gentianales
- Family: Rubiaceae
- Subfamily: Rubioideae
- Tribe: Spermacoceae
- Genus: Hedyotis; L.

Type species
- Hedyotis fruticosa L.

Species
- ~ 115 species, see text

Genus of flowering plants

Hedyotis (starviolet) is a genus of flowering plants in the family Rubiaceae. Many species of this genus such as Hedyotis biflora, H. corymbosa and H. diffusa are well known medicinal plants. Hedyotis is native to tropical and subtropical Asia and to islands of the northwest Pacific. It comprises about 115 species. The type species for the genus is Hedyotis fruticosa.

Hedyotis was named by Carl Linnaeus in 1753 in Species Plantarum. This generic name is derived from two Greek words, hedys, "sweet", and otos, "ear", in reference to the sweet-scented, ear-shaped leaves of some species.

== Taxonomy ==
Hedyotis was formerly defined very broadly by some authors, and included species now placed in Oldenlandia, Oldenlandiopsis, Houstonia, Kadua, and other genera. It is now circumscribed more narrowly, as a monophyletic group that is closely related to Agathisanthemum.

The genus Pleiocraterium was erected by Bremekamp with Hedyotis verticillaris moved to it as P. verticillare along with the species P. plantaginifolium from Sri Lanka, P. sumatranum and P. gentianifolium, both of Sumatra. Molecular phylogenetic studies however have found this genus to nest within other representatives of the genus Hedyotis with little support for a separate genus.

=== Species ===
As of March 2023, Plants of the World Online accepted the following species:

- Hedyotis acutangula Champ. ex Benth.
- Hedyotis aimiriikensis Kaneh.
- Hedyotis albonerva Bedd.
- Hedyotis articularis R.Br. ex Wight & Arn.
- Hedyotis atropurpurea Merr.
- Hedyotis austrosinica L.Wu & L.H.Yang
- Hedyotis bahaii J.F.Maxwell
- Hedyotis bambusetorum Merr.
- Hedyotis baotingensis W.C.Ko
- Hedyotis barberi (Gamble) A.N.Henry & Subr.
- Hedyotis beddomei Hook.f.
- Hedyotis benguetensis (Elmer) Elmer
- Hedyotis bourdillonii (Gamble) R.S.Rao & Hemadri ex N.C.Nair, V.J.Nair & R.Ansari
- Hedyotis brachyantha Merr.
- Hedyotis bracteosa Hance
- Hedyotis buxifolia Bedd.
- Hedyotis cagayanensis Merr.
- Hedyotis camarinensis Merr.
- Hedyotis cantoniensis F.C.How ex W.C.Ko
- Hedyotis cardiophylla Quisumb. & Merr.
- Hedyotis catanduanensis Merr.
- Hedyotis cathayana W.C.Ko
- Hedyotis caudata Merr.
- Hedyotis caudatifolia Merr. & F.P.Metcalf
- Hedyotis ceylanica N.Wikstr. & Neupane
- Hedyotis cheniana R.J.Wang
- Hedyotis cinereoviridis Thwaites
- Hedyotis communis W.C.Ko
- Hedyotis coprosmoides Trimen
- Hedyotis cornifolia Kaneh.
- Hedyotis cryptantha Dunn
- Hedyotis cushingiae Fosberg
- Hedyotis cyanantha Kurz
- Hedyotis cyanescens Thwaites
- Hedyotis decora E.T.Geddes
- Hedyotis dendroides Alston
- Hedyotis densa Craib
- Hedyotis devicolamensis Deb & Ratna Dutta
- Hedyotis diffusissima Merr.
- Hedyotis divaricata (Valeton) Hosok.
- Hedyotis edanoii Quisumb. & Merr.
- Hedyotis effusa Hance
- Hedyotis equisetiformis Wernham
- Hedyotis eualata (Gamble) A.N.Henry & Subr.
- Hedyotis eucapitata Merr.
- Hedyotis evenia Thwaites
- Hedyotis exserta Merr.
- Hedyotis fissistipula Merr.
- Hedyotis flavescens Thwaites
- Hedyotis flexuosa Ridl.
- Hedyotis fruticosa L.
- Hedyotis fruticulosa (Volkens) Merr.
- Hedyotis fumata Alston
- Hedyotis gamblei A.N.Henry & Subr.
- Hedyotis gardneri Thwaites
- Hedyotis garrettii Craib
- Hedyotis gartmorensis Ridsdale
- Hedyotis gentianifolia (Bremek.) N.Wikstr. & Neupane
- Hedyotis globiceps Ridl.
- Hedyotis griffithii Hook.f.
- Hedyotis hainanensis (Chun) W.C.Ko
- Hedyotis hamiguitanensis Santor, D.D.B.Santiago & Alejandro
- Hedyotis havilandii King
- Hedyotis hirsutissima Bedd.
- Hedyotis humilis Merr.
- Hedyotis inamoena Thwaites
- Hedyotis indirae K.M.P.Kumar & Aiswarya
- Hedyotis kamputensis (Pit.) Wangwasit & Chantar.
- Hedyotis korrorensis (Valeton) Hosok.
- Hedyotis kottangathattiensis M.B.Viswan. & Manik.
- Hedyotis kurzii Merr.
- Hedyotis laciniata Kaneh.
- Hedyotis lancea Thunb. ex Maxim.
- Hedyotis laotica (Pit.) Wangwasit & Chantar.
- Hedyotis lawsoniae Wight & Arn.
- Hedyotis leschenaultiana DC.
- Hedyotis lessertiana Arn.
- Hedyotis leuserensis N.Wikstr. & Neupane
- Hedyotis loganioides Benth.
- Hedyotis longiexserta Merr. & F.P.Metcalf
- Hedyotis longipedunculata Merr.
- Hedyotis longipetala Merr.
- Hedyotis luzoniensis Merr.
- Hedyotis lychnidifolia Craib
- Hedyotis macgregorii Merr.
- Hedyotis macraei Hook.f.
- Hedyotis macrophylla Wall. ex Wight & Arn.
- Hedyotis macrostegia Stapf
- Hedyotis maingayi Hook.f.
- Hedyotis marginata (Thwaites ex Trimen) Alston
- Hedyotis matthewii Dunn
- Hedyotis megalantha Merr.
- Hedyotis membranacea Thwaites
- Hedyotis mindorensis Quisumb.
- Hedyotis minutopuberula Merr. & F.P.Metcalf
- Hedyotis montana Merr.
- Hedyotis nairii Murug. & V.Balas.
- Hedyotis nankunshanensis R.J.Wang & S.J.Deng
- Hedyotis nanlingensis R.J.Wang
- Hedyotis neesiana Arn.
- Hedyotis neolessertiana Ridsdale
- Hedyotis nigrescens Merr.
- Hedyotis nodiflora Wall. ex G.Don
- Hedyotis nodulosa Arn.
- Hedyotis novoguineensis Merr. & L.M.Perry
- Hedyotis nutans (Valeton) P.Royen
- Hedyotis obscura Thwaites
- Hedyotis oligantha Merr.
- Hedyotis ovalis (Korth.) Walp.
- Hedyotis ovata Thunb. ex Maxim.
- Hedyotis papafranciscoi Alejandro
- Hedyotis paridifolia Dunn
- Hedyotis patens Ridl.
- Hedyotis phanerophlebia Merr.
- Hedyotis philippensis (Willd. ex Spreng.) Merr. ex C.B.Rob.
- Hedyotis pilosissima Merr.
- Hedyotis pinaster Ridl.
- Hedyotis plantaginifolia Arn.
- Hedyotis ponapensis (Valeton) Kaneh.
- Hedyotis prostrata Blume
- Hedyotis protrusa Stapf
- Hedyotis pruinosa Wight & Arn.
- Hedyotis puberulifolia Y.D.Xu & R.J.Wang
- Hedyotis pubescens (Valeton) Merr. & L.M.Perry
- Hedyotis puffii Wangwasit & Chantar.
- Hedyotis pulchella Stapf
- Hedyotis pulcherrima Dunn
- Hedyotis punicea Craib
- Hedyotis purpurascens Hook.f.
- Hedyotis quinquinervia Thwaites
- Hedyotis rajasekaranii Karupp. & V.Ravich.
- Hedyotis ramarowii (Gamble) R.S.Rao & Hemadri
- Hedyotis resupinata Ridl.
- Hedyotis rhinophylla Thwaites ex Trimen
- Hedyotis rigida (Blume) Walp.
- Hedyotis rivalis Ridl.
- Hedyotis rosmarinifolia (Pit.) Craib
- Hedyotis rugosa (Blume) Korth.
- Hedyotis sachetiana Fosberg
- Hedyotis scaberrima Merr.
- Hedyotis scaberula Hook.f.
- Hedyotis scabridifolia Kaneh.
- Hedyotis schlechteri Merr. & L.M.Perry
- Hedyotis scoparia (Pierre ex Pit.) P.H.Hô
- Hedyotis shenzhenensis Tao Chen
- Hedyotis shettyi K.Ravik. & V.Lakshm.
- Hedyotis shoolamudi Sunil, Naveen Kum. & K.M.P.Kumar
- Hedyotis sibuyanensis Elmer
- Hedyotis similis E.T.Geddes
- Hedyotis simplex Merr.
- Hedyotis simplicissima (Lour.) Merr.
- Hedyotis sithiravaraiensis Muruganand., Devanath., S.Ravik. & D.Naras.
- Hedyotis srilankensis Deb & Ratna Dutta
- Hedyotis stelligera Ridl.
- Hedyotis stylosa R.Br. ex Wight & Arn.
- Hedyotis suborthogona Hosok.
- Hedyotis subvelutina Elmer
- Hedyotis subvenosa Merr.
- Hedyotis subverticillata Alston
- Hedyotis swertioides Hook.f.
- Hedyotis symphyllarionoides Ridsdale
- Hedyotis taishanensis G.T.Wang & R.J.Wang
- Hedyotis tavoyensis N.P.Balakr.
- Hedyotis tenuipes Hemsl.
- Hedyotis terminaliflora Merr. & Chun
- Hedyotis ternata (Pierre ex Pit.) P.H.Hô
- Hedyotis tetrandra (Roxb.) Craib
- Hedyotis tetrangularis (Korth.) Walp.
- Hedyotis thwaitesii Hook.f.
- Hedyotis tomentosa (Valeton) Hosok.
- Hedyotis tonggulingensis G.B.Jiang & R.J.Wang
- Hedyotis travancorica Bedd.
- Hedyotis trichoneura Alston
- Hedyotis tridentata Ridsdale
- Hedyotis trimenii Deb & Ratna Dutta
- Hedyotis trisecta Elmer
- Hedyotis tuyamae Hosok.
- Hedyotis uncinella Hook. & Arn.
- Hedyotis vachellii Hook. & Arn.
- Hedyotis valetoniana Merr. & L.M.Perry
- Hedyotis verticillaris Wall. ex Wight & Arn.
- Hedyotis wangii R.J.Wang
- Hedyotis whiteheadii Merr.
- Hedyotis wuzhishanensis R.J.Wang
- Hedyotis xinyiensis X.Guo & R.J.Wang
- Hedyotis yangchunensis W.C.Ko & Zhang
- Hedyotis yazhouensis F.W.Xing & R.J.Wang
- Hedyotis zhihaoana Huan C.Wang & Xiao Lan Liu

==== Formerly placed here ====
- Parainvolucrella scabra (Wall. ex Kurz) M.D.Yuan & R.J.Wang (as Hedyotis scabra Wall. ex Kurz)

== Research ==
In traditional medicine, over 20 Hedyotis species have been used for treatment of diseases and in healing practices. The most popular among these are Hedyotis diffusa and Hedyotis corymbosa which are active principles in several Chinese remedies such as bai hua she she cao, peh hue juwa chi cao and feibao syrup. They are taken for treatment of cancers, infections and other diseases. Phytochemical investigation of Hedyotis species was first published in 1933 upon examining the active components of the medicinal plant H. auricularia. Since then, over 50 novel compounds have been isolated from various member of the genus Hedyotis. These compounds have highly divergent structures including alkaloids, anthraquinones, flavonoids, iridoids, triterpenoids, sterols, lignans and a number of other compounds.

Recently, two novel biological active peptides, hedyotide B1 and B2 (hedyotide = hedyotis + peptide), have been isolated from the ariel parts of the medicinal plant Hedyotis biflora. H. biflora is a small annual herb traditionally used to treat body pain in fever and malaria. Both hedyotide B1 and B2 belong to the cyclotide superfamily which was known to be an important part of plant innate defense. Hedyotide B1 has a cyclic-cystine-knot motif and displayed potent broad-spectrum activities against many bacteria including E. coli, S. salivarius, S. aureus, P. aeruginosa, B. cereus and B. megaterium. Hedyotide B1 and cyclotides are likely to exerted their antimicrobial actions by disrupting the bacteria membranes which eventually leads to cell death. As they target directly bacterial membranes. it is unlikely for bacteria to develop resistance. Therefore, hedyotide B1 with a novel mode of action has potential as a novel antimicrobial agent against drug-resistance bacteria.
