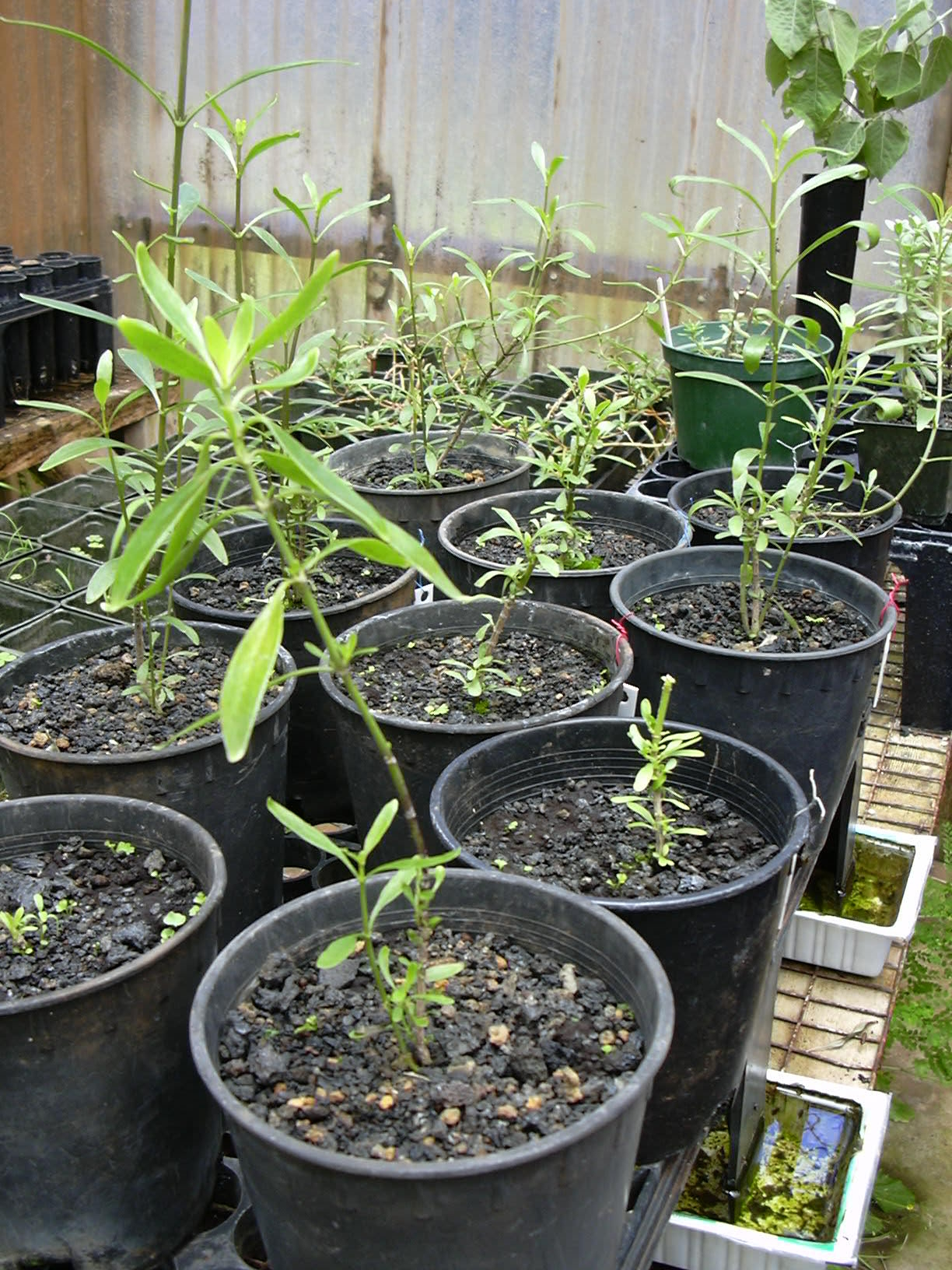

Conservation status
- Critically Imperiled (NatureServe)

Scientific classification
- Kingdom: Plantae
- Clade: Tracheophytes
- Clade: Angiosperms
- Clade: Eudicots
- Clade: Asterids
- Order: Gentianales
- Family: Rubiaceae
- Genus: Kadua
- Species: K. coriacea

Binomial name
- Kadua coriacea Sm.

Synonyms
- Hedyotis coriacea

= Kadua coriacea =

Species of flowering plant

Kadua coriacea (formerly Hedyotis coriacea) is a rare species of flowering plant in the coffee family known by the common name kioʻele. It is endemic to Hawaii, where it is known only from the island of Hawaiʻi and one individual remaining on Maui. It is a federally listed endangered species of the United States.

Today there are nine populations of the plant at the Pohakuloa Training Area on Hawaii totalling 155 individuals, plus 75 which have been planted in the habitat. There is one individual plant on Maui, but it was severely burned in a fire in 2007. The plant has been watered and monitored in an effort to revive it.

This plant grows in woodlands dominated by ʻōhiʻa lehua (Metrosideros polymorpha). Other plants in the habitat include aʻaliʻi (Dodonaea viscosa), koʻokoʻolau (Bidens menziesii), kawelu (Eragrostis variabilis), pili grass (Heteropogon contortus), kumuniu (Doryopteris decipiens), nehe (Melanthera lavarum), naio, (Myoporum sandwicense), ulei (Osteomeles anthyllidifolia), and ʻiliahialoʻe (Santalum ellipticum).

This is a shrub with leathery leaves up to 8 centimeters long by 3 wide. The plant blooms in cymes of fleshy tubular flowers up to a centimeter long. The fruit is a capsule containing dark brown seed.

Threats to this rare species include habitat damage and destruction by feral ungulates and introduced plant species.
