= Chewstick =

Chewstick or chew stick may refer to:

- Chew stick, a stick used for cleaning teeth
- Chewstick, a common name for several species of plants in the genus Gouania, including:
  - Chewstick, Gouania lupuloides, a Caribbean plant used for oral hygiene
  - Smoothfruit chewstick, Gouania meyenii, of Hawaii
  - O'ahu chewstick, Gouania vitifolia, of Hawaii
  - Hairyfruit chewstick, Gouania hillebrandii, of Hawaii

== See also ==
- Miswak
- Toothbrush
- Oral hygiene
