= Phyllostegia hispida =

Scientific classification
- Kingdom: Plantae
- Clade: Tracheophytes
- Clade: Angiosperms
- Clade: Eudicots
- Clade: Asterids
- Order: Lamiales
- Family: Lamiaceae
- Genus: Phyllostegia
- Species: P. hispida

Binomial name
- Phyllostegia hispida Hillebr.

Species of flowering plant

Phyllostegia hispida, the hispid phyllostegia, is an endangered species of flowering plant in the mint family, Lamiaceae. It is found only in wet forests at elevations of 2,300–4,200 feet (700–1,280 m) on the island of Molokaʻi in Hawaiʻi. This green vine's loosely spreading branches often form a large mass.

== Conservation ==
Only ten individual specimens were found between 1910 and 1996. P. hispida was thought to be extinct in 1997, but two seedlings were found at The Nature Conservancy's Kamakou Preserve in 2005. Since 2007, 24 wild plants have been discovered. A total of 238 plants are known to currently exist.

Phyllostegia hispida was classified as endangered by the United States Fish and Wildlife Service in 2009. P. hispida is the second species to be classified as endangered by the Barack Obama administration.
