= Phyllostegia knudsenii =

Conservation status
- Critically Imperiled (NatureServe)

- Critically endangered, possibly extinct (IUCN 3.1)

Scientific classification
- Kingdom: Plantae
- Clade: Tracheophytes
- Clade: Angiosperms
- Clade: Eudicots
- Clade: Asterids
- Order: Lamiales
- Family: Lamiaceae
- Genus: Phyllostegia
- Species: P. knudsenii

Binomial name
- Phyllostegia knudsenii Hillebr.

Species of flowering plant

Phyllostegia knudsenii is a rare species of flowering plant in the mint family known by the common name Waimea phyllostegia and Knudsen's phyllostegia. It is endemic to Hawaii, where it is known only from the island of Kauai. It is a federally listed endangered species of the United States.

This is a perennial herb or vine with limp leaves up to 18 centimeters long by 9 wide. The flowers are just under a centimeter long.

This plant was first collected in the 19th century and was not seen again until 1993, when a single plant was found. Three more were found later that year. Four additional plants were found in 1999 and five immature plants were located in 2001. There may be up to fifty plants remaining in unsurveyed areas.
