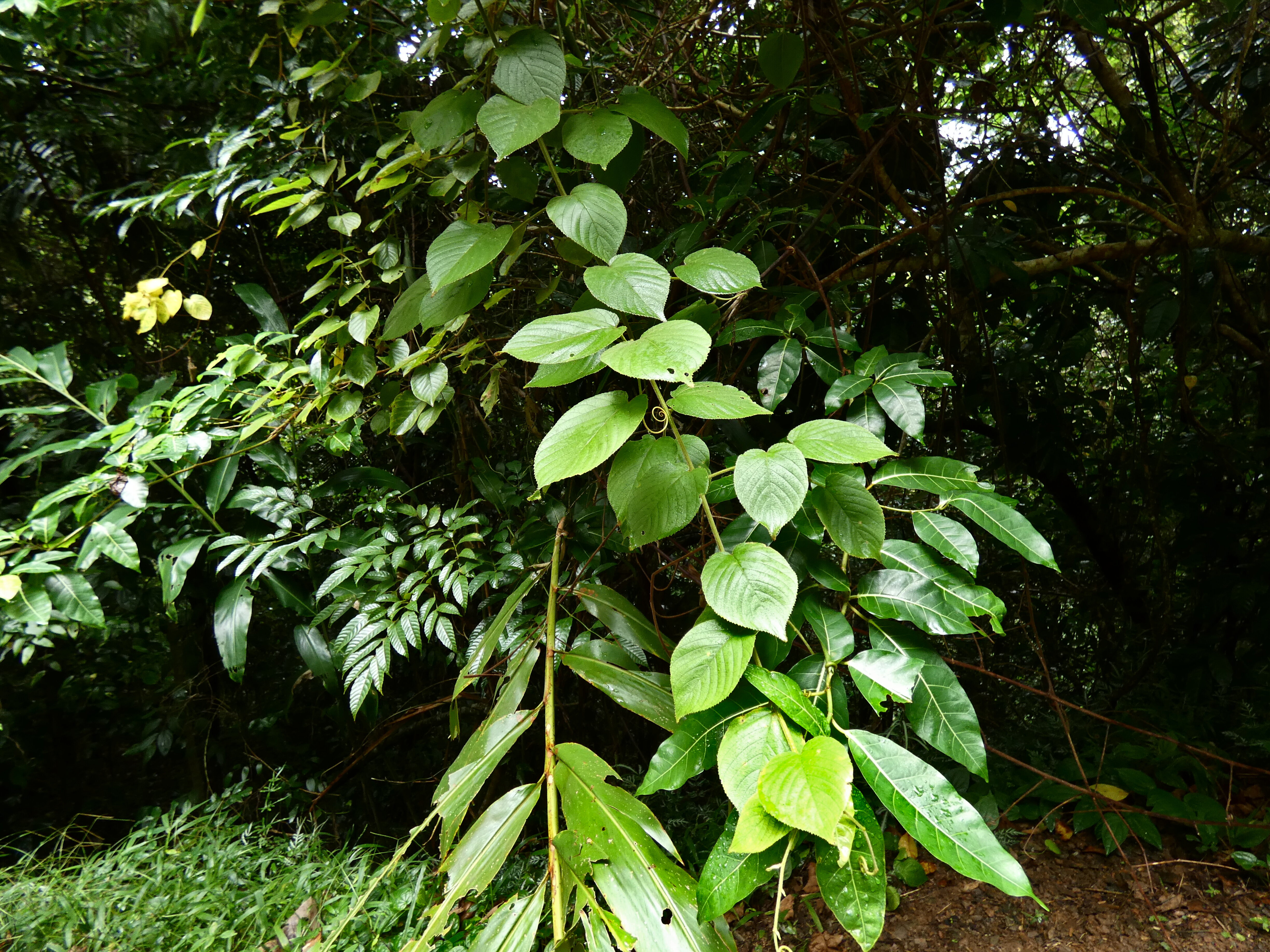

Scientific classification
- Kingdom: Plantae
- Clade: Embryophytes
- Clade: Tracheophytes
- Clade: Spermatophytes
- Clade: Angiosperms
- Clade: Eudicots
- Clade: Rosids
- Order: Rosales
- Family: Rhamnaceae
- Genus: Gouania
- Species: G. australiana

Binomial name
- Gouania australiana F.Muell.

= Gouania australiana =

Species of flowering plant

Gouania australiana is a species of plant in the family Rhamnaceae, first described in 1864. It is native to the Wet Tropics bioregion of Queensland, Australia, and has a conservation status of least concern.

== Description ==
Gouania australiana is a vine with a stem diameter up to 6 cm (2.4 in), which climbs by the use of tendrils growing from the leaf axils or at the ends of the branches. All parts of the plant have a dense covering of fine hairs. The leaves are almost circular in shape, growing up to 12 cm (4.7 in) long and 10 cm (3.9 in) wide, with a cordate base and an acuminate (shorty pointed) tip. The margins of the leaf blade are finely toothed, more so towards the tip.

The inflorescence is much-branched and consists of a number of spikes; they are clustered at the ends of the branches. Flowers are reported to have a pleasant fragrance, and are about 3 mm (0.12 in) diameter. Both the calyx and petals are white.

The fruit is a cluster of three pale brown samaras about 5 mm (0.20 in) wide and long, each with one seed about 1 mm (0.04 in) long.

=== Phenology ===
Flowering occurs between June and October, fruit occur between September and January.

== Distribution and habitat ==
It is endemic to the Wet Tropics area of Queensland and grows in lowland rainforest between the Daintree River in the north to Tully in the south. The altitudinal range is from near sea level to about 300 m (980 ft).

== Conservation ==
This species is listed as least concern under the Queensland Government's Nature Conservation Act. As of 12 June 2026, it has not been assessed by the International Union for Conservation of Nature (IUCN).

== Gallery ==
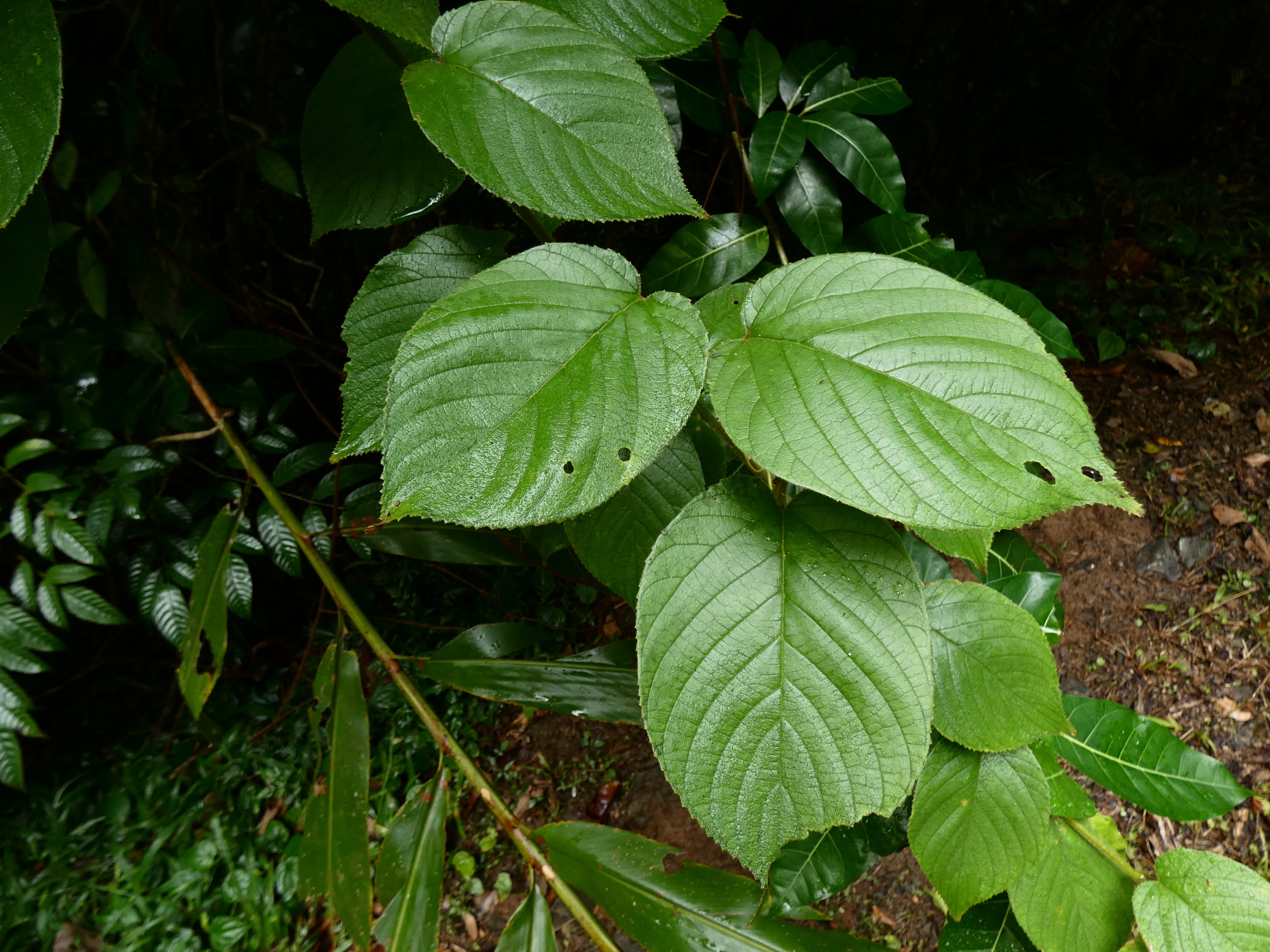
Leaves

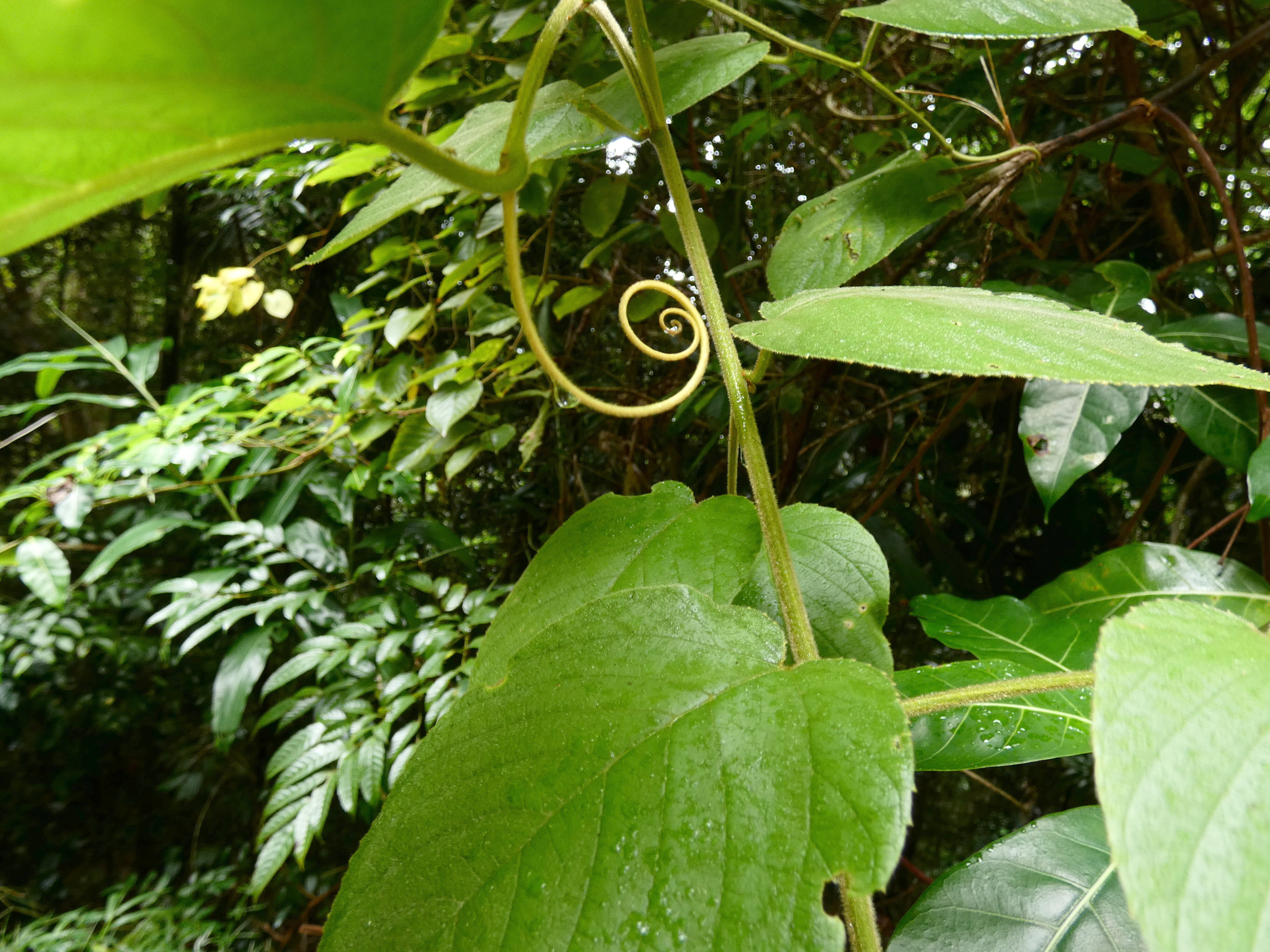
Tendril

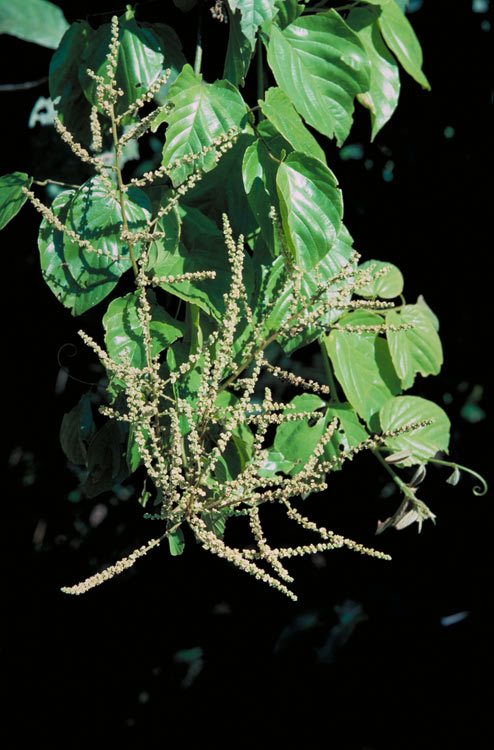
Flowers

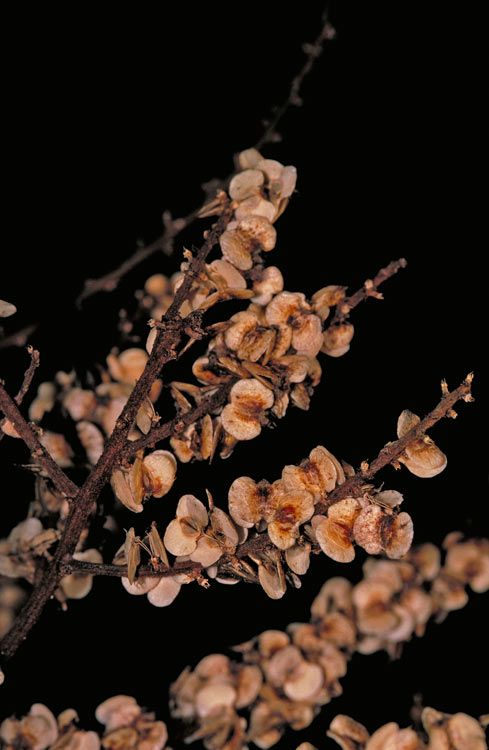
Fruit
