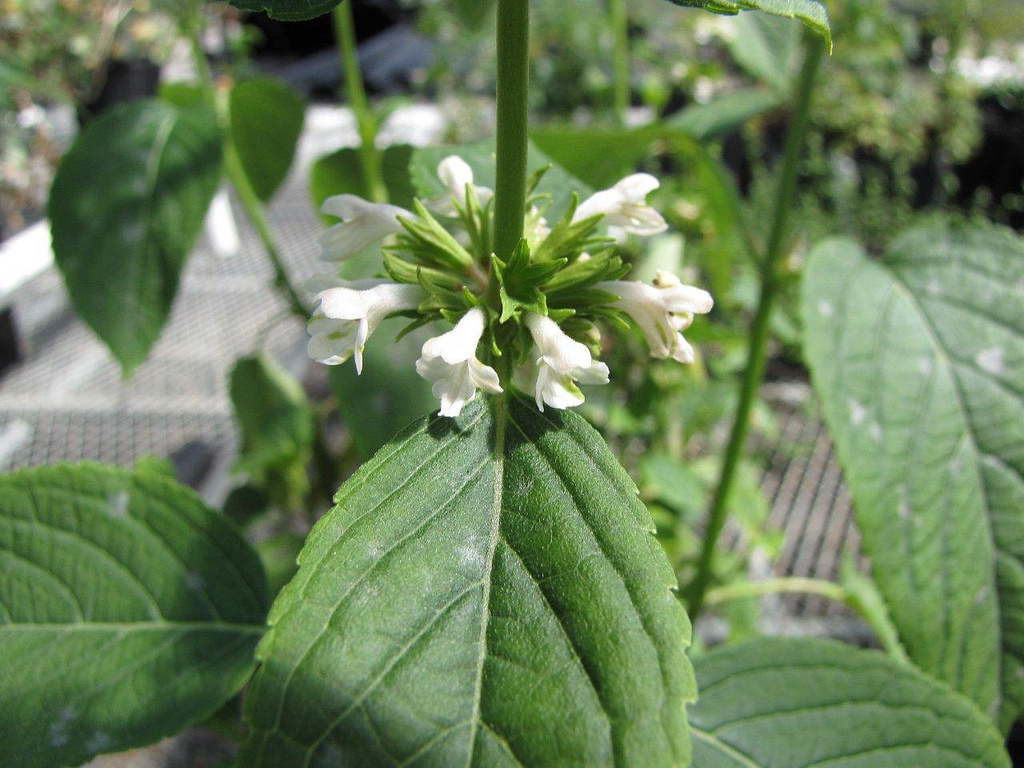
- Phyllostegia haliakalae

Scientific classification
- Kingdom: Plantae
- Clade: Tracheophytes
- Clade: Angiosperms
- Clade: Eudicots
- Clade: Asterids
- Order: Lamiales
- Family: Lamiaceae
- Subfamily: Lamioideae
- Genus: Phyllostegia; Benth.

= Phyllostegia =

Genus of plants

Phyllostegia is a genus of flowering plant in the mint family, Lamiaceae, first described in 1840. It is native to certain islands in the Pacific (Hawaii, Tonga and the Society Islands, although it appears to be extinct in the Society Islands). Phyllostegia glabra var. lanaiensis, became extinct before 2021, and was delisted from the Endangered Species Act based on extinction.

Species

1. Phyllostegia ambigua (A.Gray) Hillebr - Hawaii Big Island, Maui
2. Phyllostegia bracteata Sherff - Maui
3. Phyllostegia brevidens A.Gray - Hawaii Big Island, Maui
4. Phyllostegia electra C.N.Forbes - Kauai
5. Phyllostegia floribunda Benth - Hawaii Big Island
6. Phyllostegia glabra (Gaudich.) Benth. - Hawaiian Islands
7. Phyllostegia grandiflora (Gaudich.) Benth - Oahu
8. Phyllostegia haliakalae Wawra - Maui, Molokai
9. Phyllostegia helleri Sherff - Wai'alae Valley of Kauai
10. †Phyllostegia hillebrandii H.Mann ex Hillebr - Maui but extinct
11. Phyllostegia hirsuta Benth. - Oahu
12. Phyllostegia hispida Hillebr. - Molokai
13. Phyllostegia kaalaensis H.St.John - Oahu
14. Phyllostegia kahiliensis H.St.John - Kauai
15. Phyllostegia knudsenii Hillebr. - Kauai
16. Phyllostegia macrophylla (Gaudich.) Benth. - Hawaii Big Island, Maui
17. Phyllostegia mannii Sherff - Molokai, Maui
18. Phyllostegia micrantha H.St.John - Oahu
19. Phyllostegia mollis Benth. - Hawaiian Islands (Maui, Oʻahu)
20. Phyllostegia parviflora Benth. - Hawaiian Islands
21. Phyllostegia pilosa H.St.John - Hawaiian Islands
22. Phyllostegia racemosa Benth. - Hawaiian Islands
23. Phyllostegia renovans W.L.Wagner - Kauai
24. †Phyllostegia rockii Sherff - Maui but extinct
25. Phyllostegia stachyoides A.Gray - Hawaiian Islands
26. †Phyllostegia tahitensis Nadeaud - Tahiti but extinct
27. Phyllostegia tongaensis H.St.John - Tonga
28. †Phyllostegia variabilis Bitter - Midway Islands but extinct
29. Phyllostegia velutina (Sherff) H.St.John - Hawaii Big Island
30. Phyllostegia vestita Benth. - Hawaii Big Island
31. Phyllostegia waimeae Wawra - Kauai
32. Phyllostegia warshaueri H.St.John - Hawaii Big Island
33. Phyllostegia wawrana Sherff - Kauai
34. Phyllostegia × yamaguchii Hosaka & O.Deg. - Oahu (P. glabra × P. hirsuta)
