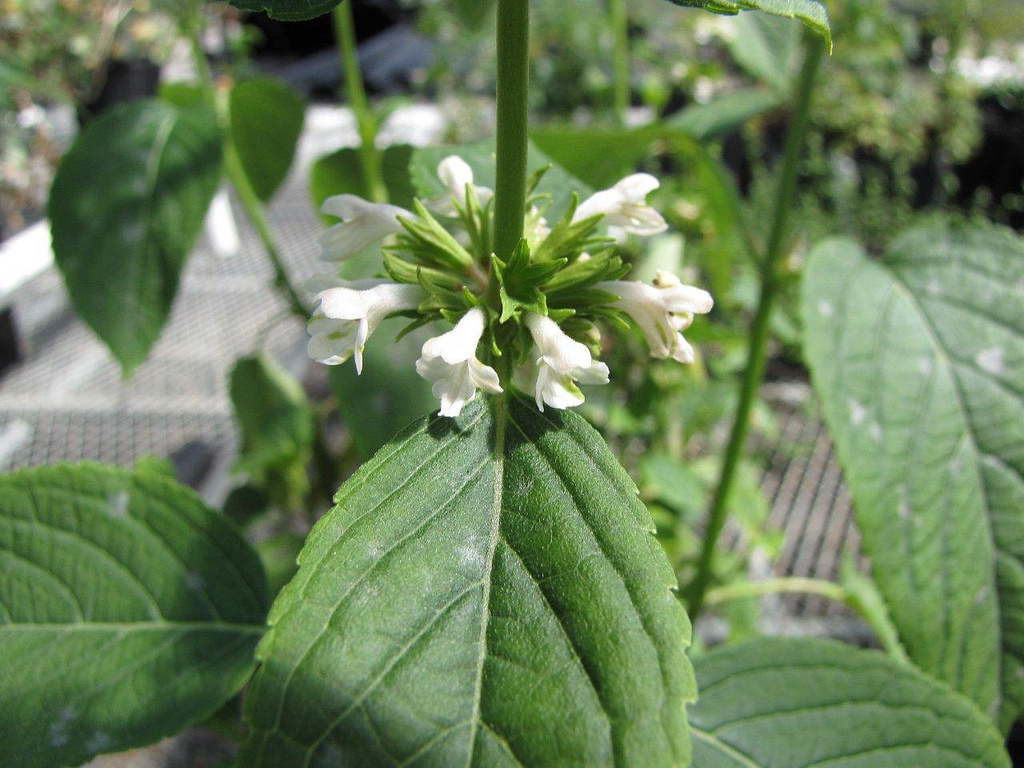

Conservation status
- Critically Endangered (IUCN 3.1)

Scientific classification
- Kingdom: Plantae
- Clade: Tracheophytes
- Clade: Angiosperms
- Clade: Eudicots
- Clade: Asterids
- Order: Lamiales
- Family: Lamiaceae
- Genus: Phyllostegia
- Species: P. haliakalae

Binomial name
- Phyllostegia haliakalae Wawra

Synonyms
- Phyllostegia deltoidea H.St.John; Phyllostegia helleri var. imminuta Sherff; Phyllostegia imminuta (Sherff) H.St.John; Phyllostegia makawaoensis H.St.John; Phyllostegia mollis var. micrantha Sherff; Phyllostegia triquetra H.St.John

= Phyllostegia haliakalae =

Species of flowering plant

Phyllostegia haliakalae, commonly known as the Haliakala phyllostegia, is a species of flowering plant in the mint family, Lamiaceae. It was described by Heinrich Wawra von Fernsee in 1872. The species Latin name derives from the Hawaiian word, "haliakala", which means "happy".

== Description ==
Phyllostegia haliakalae is a viny suberect herb plant, with forward-bending hairs on its stems. Ovate leaves, that are 9–22 cm (3.5-8.7 inches) long, 4–10 cm (1.6-3.9 inches) wide, and are generally thin and hairy, like most other species of phyllostegia. White flowers and blooms, that surround part of the upper leaflet. Seeds are on average 2 mm (0.1 inch) long.

== Distribution and habitat ==
Phyllostegia haliakalae is endemic to the Hawaiian Islands, primarily the islands of Maui (eastern portion), Lanai, Molokai, and recently Oahu, where the species grows in mesic forest, wet forest, wet cliff, and dry cliff ecosystems. It is known to grow beside other species of phyllostegia, but also other Hawaiian endemic plants, such as ferns.

== Classification and conservation ==
Phyllostegia haliakalae has had up to six synonyms in the past, which is quite a lot compared to other species in the genera, and other plants of Hawaii. The species was originally misclassified, being assigned to Phyllostegia pilosa, and afterwards, Pyllostegia mollis, until it was reassigned to its own appropriate taxon.

Phyllostegia haliakalae is currently listed as "Critically Endangered" by the IUCN Red List, for habitat loss, invasive plants, and disease are very potent to its decreasing population. Some botanists beg to differ about its current conservation status, for they believe it has already gone extinct, although there are four individuals remaining in the wild, but this number may have gradually changed to lower numbers. There are a few specimens in captivity though, which could possibly restore the population if there were to be an extinction event. The short-term trend for its population is at a decline of over 30% since 2012.

== Uses ==
There are no currently listed uses for Phyllostegia halaiakalae because of its endemicity and rarity, although there may be a few older uses before the drastic population decline.
