= Phyllostegia kaalaensis =

Conservation status
- Critically Endangered (IUCN 3.1)

Scientific classification
- Kingdom: Plantae
- Clade: Tracheophytes
- Clade: Angiosperms
- Clade: Eudicots
- Clade: Asterids
- Order: Lamiales
- Family: Lamiaceae
- Genus: Phyllostegia
- Species: P. kaalaensis

Binomial name
- Phyllostegia kaalaensis H.St.John

Species of flowering plant

Phyllostegia kaalaensis, the Kaala phyllostegia, is a species of flowering plant in the mint family, Lamiaceae, that is endemic to the island of Oʻahu in Hawaiʻi. It can be found in mesic forests on the slopes of the Waiʻanae Range at elevations of 374–796 metres (1,227–2,612 ft).

In 2003 there were 36 or 37 individuals remaining. By 2008 all wild individuals were thought to have been extirpated. Some plants are in propagation and have been planted in appropriate habitat.
