= Phyllostegia mannii =

Conservation status
- Critically endangered, possibly extinct in the wild (IUCN 3.1)

- Critically Imperiled (NatureServe)

Scientific classification
- Kingdom: Plantae
- Clade: Tracheophytes
- Clade: Angiosperms
- Clade: Eudicots
- Clade: Asterids
- Order: Lamiales
- Family: Lamiaceae
- Genus: Phyllostegia
- Species: P. mannii

Binomial name
- Phyllostegia mannii Sherff

Synonyms
- Phyllostegia bryanii (Sherff) H.St.John; Stenogyne parviflora H.Mann

Species of flowering plant

Phyllostegia mannii is a rare species of flowering plant in the mint family known by the common name Mann's phyllostegia. It is endemic to Hawaii, where it has been known from Maui and Molokai. It has not been observed on Maui since the early 20th century, or on Molokai since 1993, but it probably still exists in unsurveyed areas. It is a federally listed endangered species of the United States.
