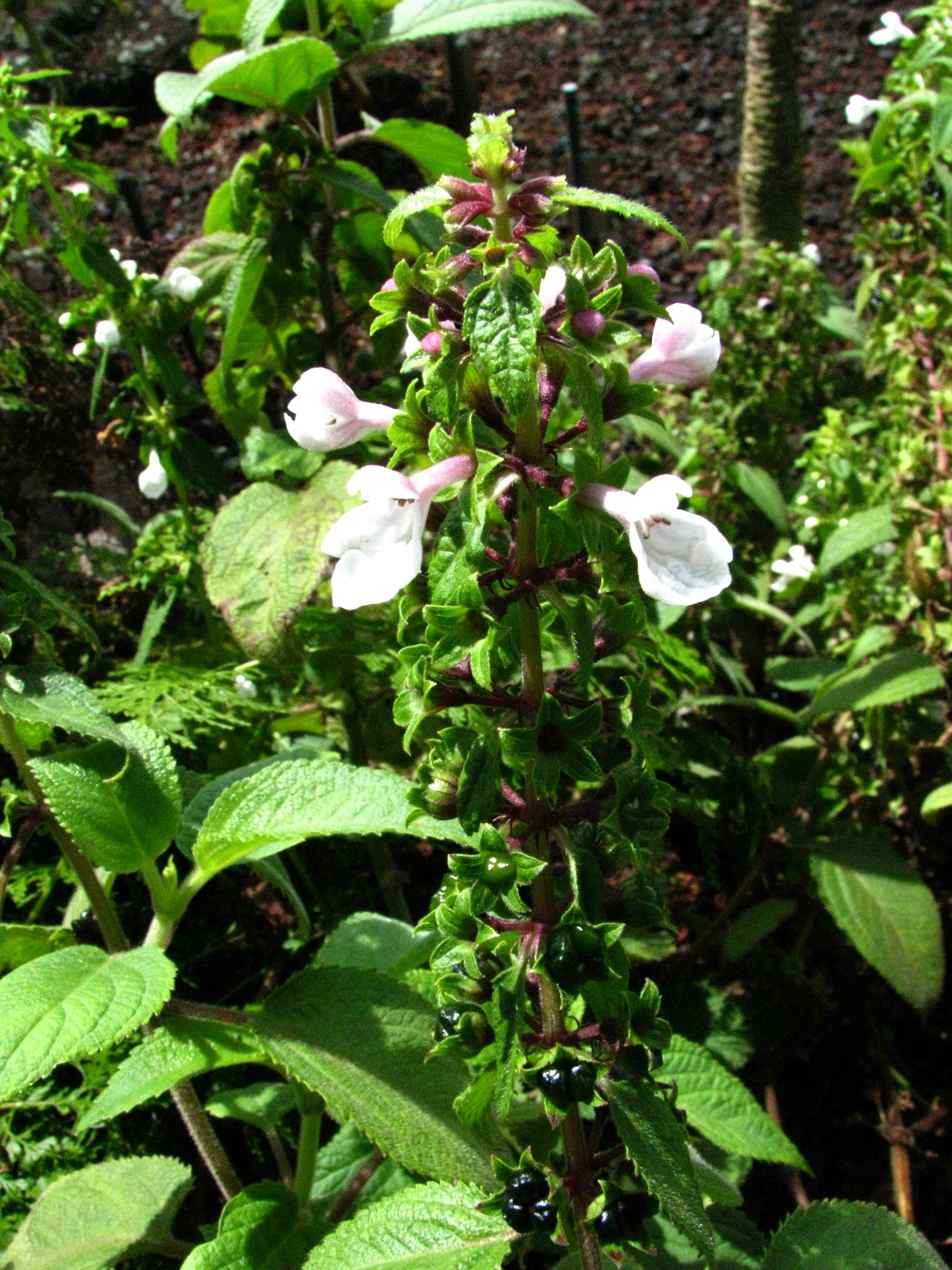

Conservation status
- Critically Imperiled (NatureServe)

Scientific classification
- Kingdom: Plantae
- Clade: Tracheophytes
- Clade: Angiosperms
- Clade: Eudicots
- Clade: Asterids
- Order: Lamiales
- Family: Lamiaceae
- Genus: Phyllostegia
- Species: P. renovans

Binomial name
- Phyllostegia renovans W.L.Wagner

= Phyllostegia renovans =

Species of flowering plant

Phyllostegia renovans is a rare species of flowering plant in the mint family known by the common name red-leaf phyllostegia. It is endemic to Hawaii, where it is known only from the island of Kauai. It was federally listed as an endangered species of the United States in 2010.

This species was discovered in 1989 and described to science in 1999. It is known from about 6 populations, but some of these populations contain only one plant each.

This subshrub has climbing stems that can reach 3 or 4 meters in length. The oval leaves are up to 20 centimeters long by 8.8 wide. The inflorescence is a raceme of white flowers each about 2 centimeters in length.
