= Phyllostegia hirsuta =

Conservation status
- Critically Imperiled (NatureServe)

Scientific classification
- Kingdom: Plantae
- Clade: Tracheophytes
- Clade: Angiosperms
- Clade: Eudicots
- Clade: Asterids
- Order: Lamiales
- Family: Lamiaceae
- Genus: Phyllostegia
- Species: P. hirsuta

Binomial name
- Phyllostegia hirsuta Benth.

Synonyms
- Phyllostegia laxior (O.Deg. & Sherff) H.St.John; Phyllostegia ternaria H.St.John

Species of flowering plant

Phyllostegia hirsuta is a species of flowering plant in the mint family known by the common names Molokai phyllostegia and hairy phyllostegia. It is endemic to Hawaii, where it is known only from the island of Oahu. It is a federally listed endangered species of the United States.

This plant is a subshrub or vine with hairy, glandular, oval-shaped leaves up to 30 centimeters long by 18 wide. The flower is white with purple tinting on its upper lip.

The plant occurs in the Waianae and Koʻolau Mountains of Oahu. There are nine populations totalling about 160 mature plants. In areas where the plant has apparently been extirpated, it may reappear in the future as plants sprout from the underground soil seed bank. Threats to the species include feral pigs and introduced species of plants. Some populations of the plant are or may soon be under the protection of the United States Army, which operates in the plant's habitat.
