= Phyllostegia velutina =

Conservation status
- Critically Imperiled (NatureServe)

Scientific classification
- Kingdom: Plantae
- Clade: Tracheophytes
- Clade: Angiosperms
- Clade: Eudicots
- Clade: Asterids
- Order: Lamiales
- Family: Lamiaceae
- Genus: Phyllostegia
- Species: P. velutina

Binomial name
- Phyllostegia velutina (Sherff) H.St.John

Synonyms
- Phyllostegia kilaueaensis H.St.John

Species of flowering plant

Phyllostegia velutina is a rare species of flowering plant in the mint family known by the common name velvet phyllostegia. It is endemic to Hawaii, where it is limited to the island of Hawaii, including the slopes of Mauna Loa and Mauna Kea. It is a federally listed endangered species of the United States.

This white-flowered vine grows in moist and wet forest habitat on volcanic soils. There are fewer than 60 individuals remaining. The species is threatened by feral pigs, introduced species of plants, and deforestation.
