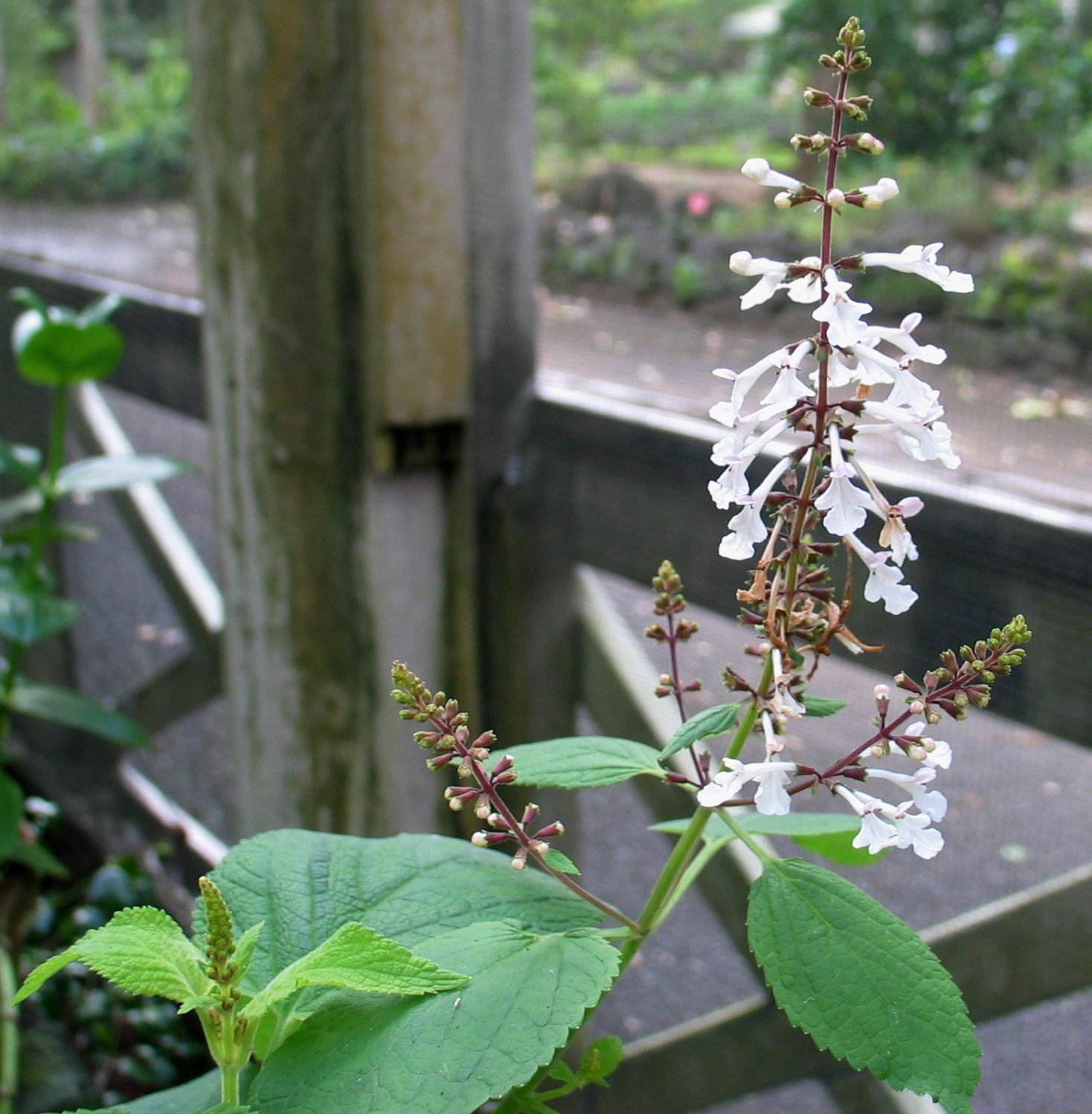

Conservation status
- Critically Endangered (IUCN 3.1)

Scientific classification
- Kingdom: Plantae
- Clade: Tracheophytes
- Clade: Angiosperms
- Clade: Eudicots
- Clade: Asterids
- Order: Lamiales
- Family: Lamiaceae
- Genus: Phyllostegia
- Species: P. mollis

Binomial name
- Phyllostegia mollis Benth.

Synonyms
- Phyllostegia honolulensis Wawra; Phyllostegia obatae H.St.John; Phyllostegia swezeyi H.St.John

= Phyllostegia mollis =

Species of flowering plant

Map of the endangered habitat

Phyllostegia mollis, the Waianae Range phyllostegia, is a species of flowering plant in the family Lamiaceae that is endemic to Hawaiʻi. It can be found in mesic and wet forests at elevations of 450–1,830 metres (1,480–6,000 ft) on the islands of Maui and Oʻahu. Some authors consider it to be an Oahu endemic, with the Maui populations belonging to a separate species, Phyllostegia pilosa. By 2003 there were fewer than 40 individuals remaining. It is threatened by habitat loss.
