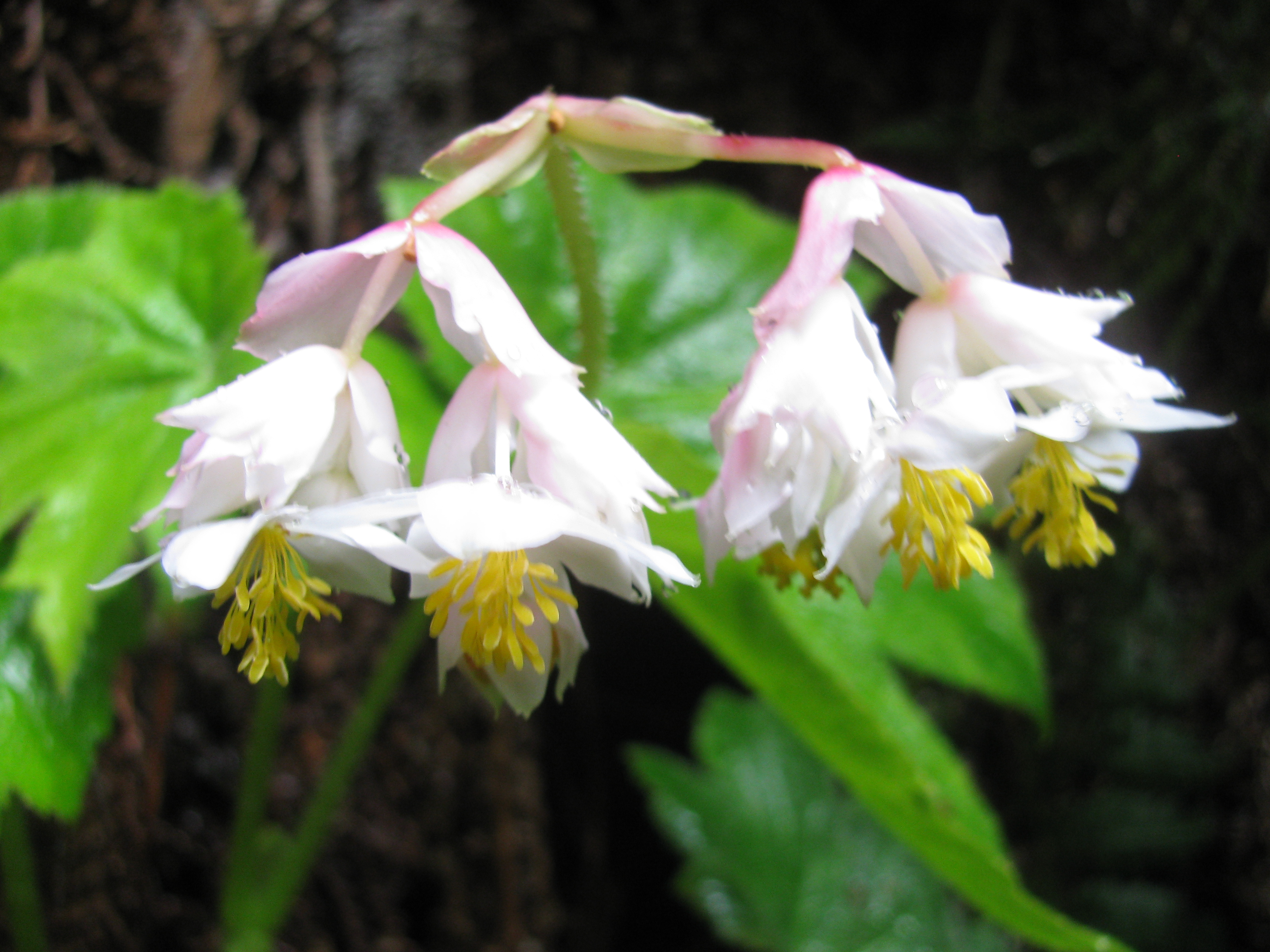

Conservation status
- Imperiled (NatureServe)

Scientific classification
- Kingdom: Plantae
- Clade: Tracheophytes
- Clade: Angiosperms
- Clade: Eudicots
- Clade: Rosids
- Order: Cucurbitales
- Family: Begoniaceae
- Genus: Hillebrandia; Oliv.
- Species: H. sandwicensis

Binomial name
- Hillebrandia sandwicensis Oliv.

= Hillebrandia =

Genus of succulents

Hillebrandia sandwicensis is a species of a herbaceous perennial flowering plant native to some of the Hawaiian Islands. Common names include ʻakaʻakaʻawa and pua maka nui. The genus name honors the German physician William Hillebrand.

== Description ==
In terms of morphology, H. sandwicensis is similar to Begonia, but differences in flower structure, pollen morphology, and fruit separate the two genera. It produces tubers, to which above-ground parts of the plant die back to after producing fruit in the summer. The seeds are very small. Plants regrow in January. It blooms from February to June. It is monoecious, with succulent branches.

== Taxonomy ==
It is classified in the family Begoniaceae and is the only species in the genus Hillebrandia; indeed, it is the only one of the 1900 or so species in the family Begoniaceae not to be a member of the genus Begonia. It is the sister taxon to the rest of its family. The time of the split precedes the oldest above-water Hawaiian Island (Kure Atoll) by an appreciable period of time. This raises the question as to how a monotypic genus got to a remote island chain considerably younger than itself.

It has been proposed that, even though forested ravines are not particularly windy, Hillebrandia island-hopped down the Hawaiian – Emperor seamount chain (then islands) via the wind often enough to colonize each island in turn, a process aided by a Cenozoic climate allowing it to live at lower altitudes than today, regardless of where the genus originated from. Hillebrandia may also be younger than previous estimates.

== Distribution and habitat ==
It is found in humid ravines covered with forest at altitudes of 900–1800 meters. Additionally, H. sandwicensis is the only species of Begoniaceae native to the Hawaiian Islands. H. sandwicensis is currently found only on the islands of Maui, Molokai, and Kauai. It is locally extinct on Oahu, and does not occur on the Big Island. Despite an abundance of suitable habitat, the species is localized and uncommon.

It has recently been getting rarer, but despite this, it is not (as of 2025) listed on the International Union for Conservation of Nature's Red List. However, a 1999 document from the American Fish and Wildlife Service did list H. sandwicensis as one of 202 "Other Species of Concern".
