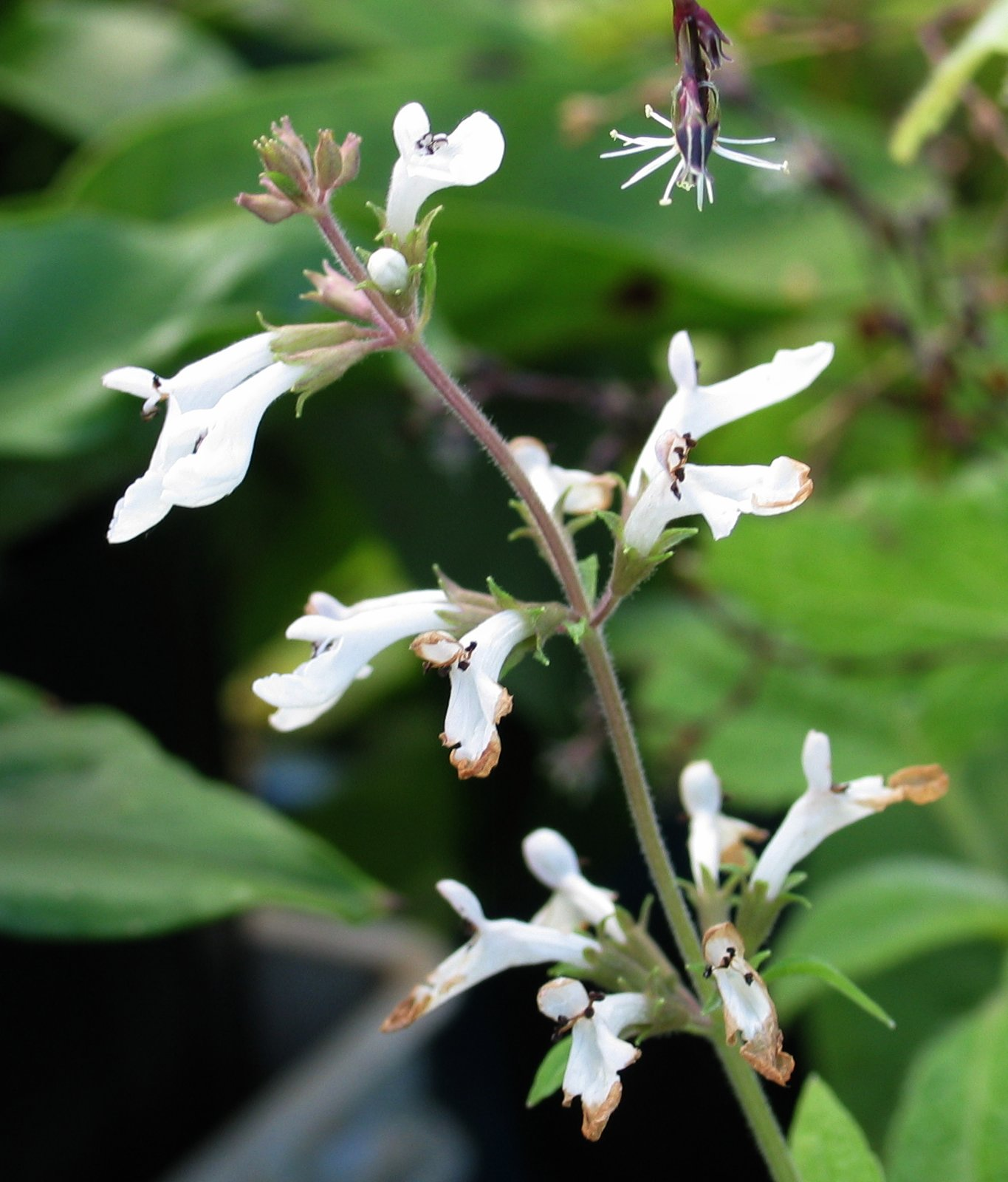
- Phyllostegia parviflora var. lydgatei

Conservation status
- Critically Imperiled (NatureServe)

Scientific classification
- Kingdom: Plantae
- Clade: Tracheophytes
- Clade: Angiosperms
- Clade: Eudicots
- Clade: Asterids
- Order: Lamiales
- Family: Lamiaceae
- Genus: Phyllostegia
- Species: P. parviflora

Binomial name
- Phyllostegia parviflora (Gaudich.) Benth.

Synonyms
- Phyllostegia leptostachya Benth.; Phyllostegia manoana H.St.John; Prasium parviflorum Gaudich.

= Phyllostegia parviflora =

Species of flowering plant

Phyllostegia parviflora is a rare species of flowering plant in the mint family known by the common name smallflower phyllostegia. It is endemic to Hawaii, where it is known from Maui, Oahu, and the island of Hawaii. It is a federally listed endangered species of the United States.

There are three varieties of this plant. The var. glabriuscula was not seen for a long time until it was rediscovered in 2006 on Hawaii. There are about 100 individuals remaining in the wild and some which have been planted in the habitat. The newly named variety lydgatei has been seen in the wild recently but now is thought to remain only in cultivation. The var. parviflora remains in a population of about 200 plants on Oahu, but it has not been seen on Maui in several years.
