= Phyllostegia tahitensis =

Scientific classification
- Kingdom: Plantae
- Clade: Tracheophytes
- Clade: Angiosperms
- Clade: Eudicots
- Clade: Asterids
- Order: Lamiales
- Family: Lamiaceae
- Genus: Phyllostegia
- Species: †P. tahitensis

Binomial name
- †Phyllostegia tahitensis Nadeaud

Species of flowering plant

Phyllostegia tahitensis, commonly known as the Tahitian phyllostegia, is an extinct species of flowering plant in the mint family, Lamiaceae. It was described by Jean Nadeaud in 1873. The species was endemic to the Society Islands, primarily Mount Marau, Tahiti, where the species was thought to have perished, but botanists do not exactly know when.
