= Phyllostegia wawrana =

Conservation status
- Critically Imperiled (NatureServe)

Scientific classification
- Kingdom: Plantae
- Clade: Tracheophytes
- Clade: Angiosperms
- Clade: Eudicots
- Clade: Asterids
- Order: Lamiales
- Family: Lamiaceae
- Genus: Phyllostegia
- Species: P. wawrana

Binomial name
- Phyllostegia wawrana Sherff

Species of flowering plant

Phyllostegia wawrana is a rare species of flowering plant in the mint family known by the common name fuzzystem phyllostegia. It is endemic to Hawaii, where it is limited to the island of Kauai. It is a federally listed endangered species of the United States.

When this plant was listed as an endangered species there were up to 36 individuals on Kauai. By 2006 there were up to 55 plants in three populations. This plant grows only in moist and wet forest habitat.
