= Phyllostegia variabilis =

Conservation status
- Possibly Extinct (NatureServe)

Scientific classification
- Kingdom: Plantae
- Clade: Tracheophytes
- Clade: Angiosperms
- Clade: Eudicots
- Clade: Asterids
- Order: Lamiales
- Family: Lamiaceae
- Genus: Phyllostegia
- Species: P. variabilis

Binomial name
- Phyllostegia variabilis Bitter

Synonyms
- Phyllostegia arenicola H.St.John

Species of flowering plant

Phyllostegia variabilis is an extinct species of flowering plant in the family Lamiaceae. It was described by Friedrich August Georg Bitter in 1900. The species was endemic to the Kure Atoll, Midway Islands, and the island of Laysan, all being a part of the Northwestern Hawaiian Islands. It was under the threat of military installations on the Kure Atoll, and the Midway Islands, but on the island of Laysan was threatened by invasive alien plants and animals. The species may or may not be still alive in its natural range, but no clear evidence of its survival is evident.
