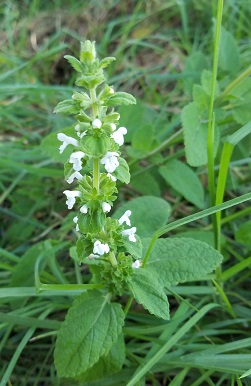

Conservation status
- Critically Imperiled (NatureServe)

Scientific classification
- Kingdom: Plantae
- Clade: Tracheophytes
- Clade: Angiosperms
- Clade: Eudicots
- Clade: Asterids
- Order: Lamiales
- Family: Lamiaceae
- Genus: Phyllostegia
- Species: P. racemosa

Binomial name
- Phyllostegia racemosa Benth.

Synonyms
- Phyllostegia rhuakos H.St.John

= Phyllostegia racemosa =

Species of flowering plant

Phyllostegia racemosa is a rare species of flowering plant in the mint family known by the common names kiponapona and racemed phyllostegia. It is endemic to Hawaii, where it is known only from the slopes of the volcanoes Mauna Loa and Mauna Kea. It is a federally listed endangered species of the United States.

This plant is a white-flowered vine with a "spicy" scent. There are probably fewer than 1000 individuals remaining in the moist and wet forests of the two volcanoes. Threats to the remaining plants include feral pigs and introduced species of plants.
