= Phyllostegia glabra =

Conservation status
- Vulnerable (NatureServe)

Scientific classification
- Kingdom: Plantae
- Clade: Tracheophytes
- Clade: Angiosperms
- Clade: Eudicots
- Clade: Asterids
- Order: Lamiales
- Family: Lamiaceae
- Genus: Phyllostegia
- Species: P. glabra

Binomial name
- Phyllostegia glabra (Gaudich.) Benth.

Synonyms
- Phyllostegia chamissonis Benth.; Phyllostegia macraei Benth.; Phyllostegia rubritincta H.St.John; Prasium glabrum Gaudich.

Species of flowering plant

Phyllostegia glabra is a species of flowering plant in the mint family known by the common name smooth phyllostegia. It is endemic to Hawaii.

Known varieties include Phyllostegia glabra var. glabra and P. g. var. lanaiensis, the latter being a perennial herb with dentate leaves, often reddish or red-veined, and white flowers, occasionally tinged with purple, distinguished from P. g. var. glabra by its shorter calyx and narrower leaves. As of 2021, NatureServe lists P. g. var. glabra as vulnerable and P. g. var. lanaiensis as possibly extinct.

In September 1991, the United States Fish and Wildlife Service (FWS) listed Phyllostegia glabra var. lanaiensis as an endangered species, stating that it had not been seen since a single plant was sighted on Lanai in the 1980s. The variety may still exist on the island, perhaps in rugged habitat that has not been surveyed recently. In September 2021, FWS stated that the last confirmed sighting of P. g. var. lanaiensis occurred in 1914 and proposed that the variety be declared extinct and stricken off the endangered species list. During the public comment period, surveys revealed new habitat that could support the species and the proposal was withdrawn.
