= Phyllostegia waimeae =

Conservation status
- Critically Imperiled (NatureServe)

- Critically Endangered (IUCN 3.1)

Scientific classification
- Kingdom: Plantae
- Clade: Tracheophytes
- Clade: Angiosperms
- Clade: Eudicots
- Clade: Asterids
- Order: Lamiales
- Family: Lamiaceae
- Genus: Phyllostegia
- Species: P. waimeae

Binomial name
- Phyllostegia waimeae Wawra

Synonyms
- Phyllostegia cordata H.St.John; Phyllostegia hobdyi H.St.John

Species of flowering plant

Phyllostegia waimeae is a rare species of flowering plant in the mint family known by the common name Kauai phyllostegia. It is endemic to Hawaii, where it is limited to the island of Kauai. It is a federally listed endangered species of the United States.

This plant was not seen since 1969 and was rediscovered in 2000. This pink-flowered subshrub grows in moist and wet forest habitat. There are only two wild individuals known to exist, but more are likely to be growing in habitat not recently surveyed. Additionally, there are several individuals that have been planted.

The species is threatened by feral pigs, feral goats, rats, introduced species of plants, and overcollection.
