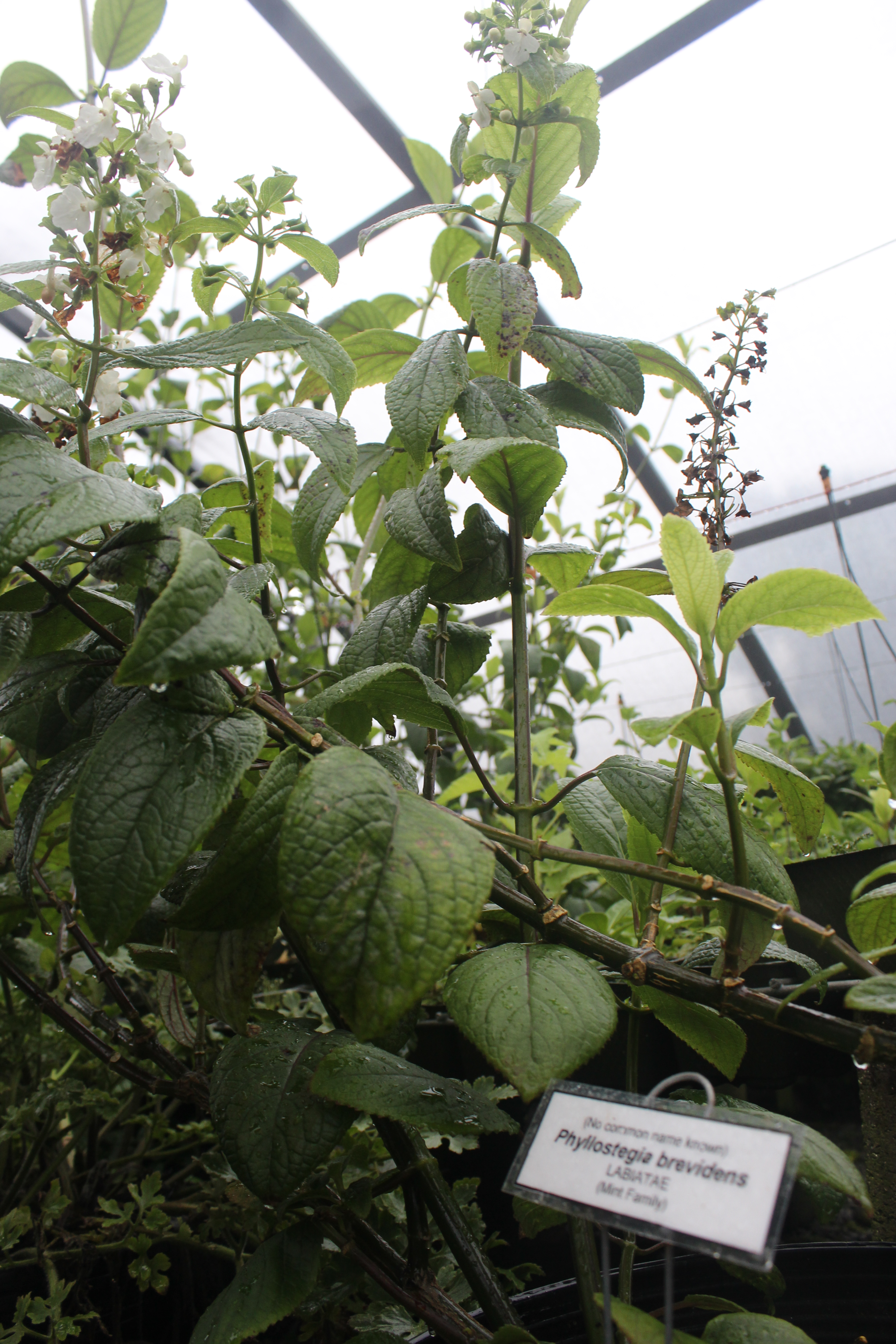

Scientific classification
- Kingdom: Plantae
- Clade: Tracheophytes
- Clade: Angiosperms
- Clade: Eudicots
- Clade: Asterids
- Order: Lamiales
- Family: Lamiaceae
- Genus: Phyllostegia
- Species: P. brevidens

Binomial name
- Phyllostegia brevidens A.Gray

Synonyms
- Phyllostegia polyantha H.St.John

= Phyllostegia brevidens =

Species of flowering plant

Phyllostegia brevidens, the Mauna Kea phyllostegia, is a plant species in the family Lamiaceae first described in 1862. It is found on Hawaii (Big Island) and on Maui.
