= Phyllostegia warshaueri =

Conservation status
- Critically Imperiled (NatureServe)

Scientific classification
- Kingdom: Plantae
- Clade: Tracheophytes
- Clade: Angiosperms
- Clade: Eudicots
- Clade: Asterids
- Order: Lamiales
- Family: Lamiaceae
- Genus: Phyllostegia
- Species: P. warshaueri

Binomial name
- Phyllostegia warshaueri Wawra

Species of flowering plant

Phyllostegia warshaueri is a rare species of flowering plant in the mint family known by the common name Laupahoehoe phyllostegia. It is endemic to Hawaii, where it is limited to the island of Hawaii. It is a federally listed endangered species of the United States.

This plant grows only on Mauna Kea and the Kohala Mountains of Hawaii, where its habitat is wet forests. There are four occurrences, for a total of under 20 individual plants. This liana can grow to 3 meters in length. It bears white flowers with pink upper lips.

The species is threatened by feral pigs, cattle, and introduced species of plants.
