= Phyllostegia hillebrandii =

Conservation status
- Possibly Extinct (NatureServe)

Scientific classification
- Kingdom: Plantae
- Clade: Tracheophytes
- Clade: Angiosperms
- Clade: Eudicots
- Clade: Asterids
- Order: Lamiales
- Family: Lamiaceae
- Genus: Phyllostegia
- Species: P. hillebrandii

Binomial name
- Phyllostegia hillebrandii H.Mann ex Hillebr.

Species of flowering plant

Phyllostegia hillebrandii, commonly known as Hillebrand's phyllostegia, is an extinct species of flowering plant in the mint family, Lamiaceae. The name was first used by Horace Mann Jr. in a list of Hawaiian plants published in 1869. It was first described (posthumously) by William Hillebrand in his Flora of the Hawaiian Islands, published in 1888. The species is thought to have gone extinct, although this can't be officially ruled out. It was endemic to the island of Maui, primarily the eastern region, where it was threatened by alien invasive species and deforestation. The last specimens were collected sometime before 1871.
