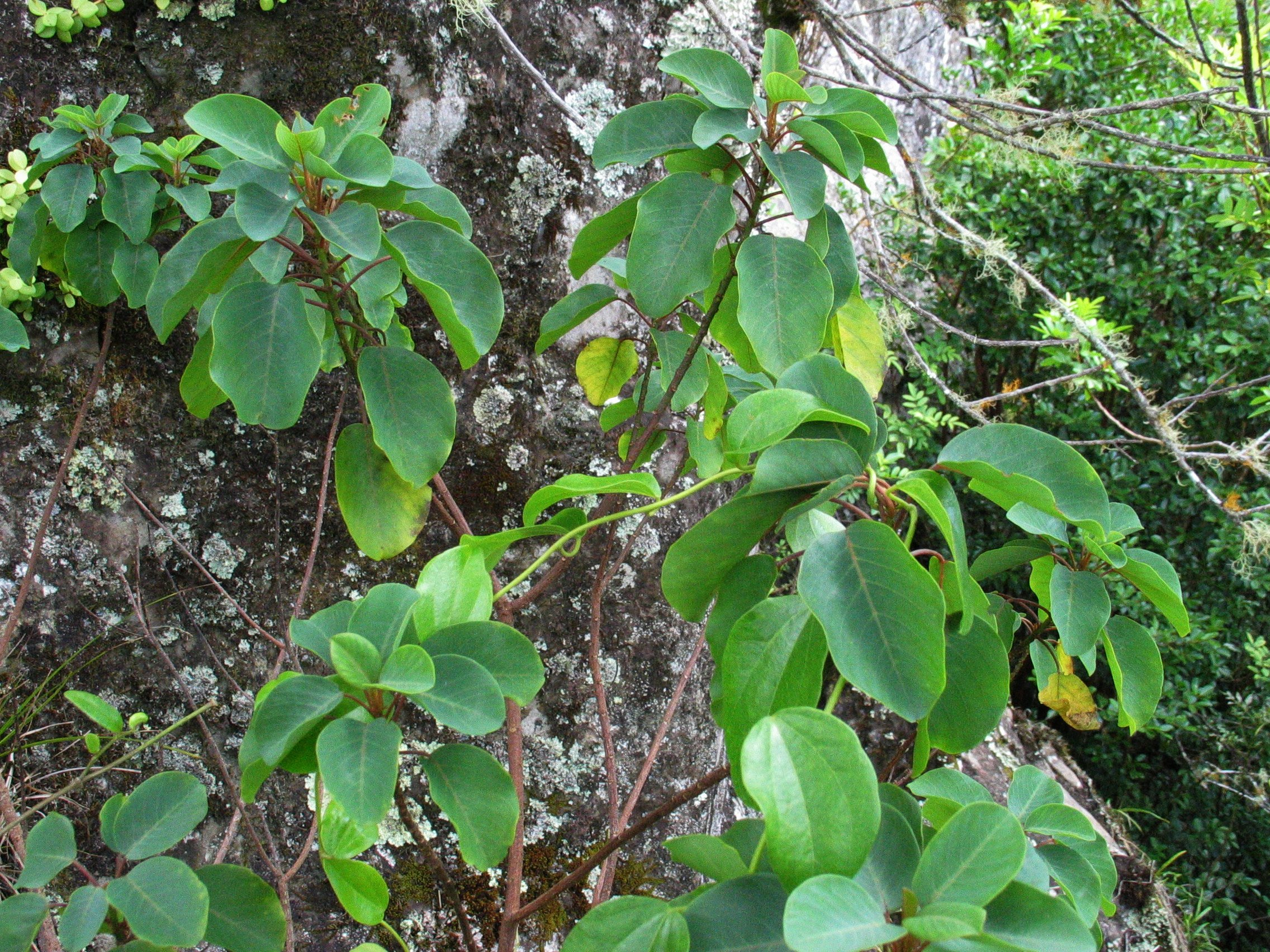

Conservation status
- Critically Endangered (IUCN 3.1)

- Critically Imperiled (NatureServe)

Scientific classification
- Kingdom: Plantae
- Clade: Embryophytes
- Clade: Tracheophytes
- Clade: Angiosperms
- Clade: Eudicots
- Clade: Rosids
- Order: Rosales
- Family: Rhamnaceae
- Genus: Gouania
- Species: G. meyenii

Binomial name
- Gouania meyenii Steud.

= Gouania meyenii =

Species of flowering plant

Gouania meyenii is a rare species of flowering plant known by the common name smoothfruit chewstick or Meyen's gouania. It is endemic to Hawaii, where it is known only from Oahu and Kauai. It is estimated that there are between 38 and 63 individuals of this species remaining in the wild. It is a federally listed endangered species of the United States.

This is a shrub with stems growing erect or spreading and growing up to 7 feet (2.1 m) in height. The leaves have oval blades up to 7 centimeters long by 4.5 wide borne on short petioles. The inflorescence is a cyme of several flowers with tiny white petals and slightly larger white sepals no more than 3 millimeters long. The small winged fruit contains brown seeds.

This shrub grows in dry or moist forest and shrubland habitat in the Waiʻanae Range of Oahu and Nā Pali Coast State Park on Kauai. It is associated with other plants such as koa (Acacia koa), maile (Alyxia stellata), kookoolau (Bidens torta), lama (Diospyros sandwicensis), aalii (Dodonaea viscosa), and naenae (Dubautia plantaginea).

Threats to this rare species and its habitat include introduced plant species, such as mistflower (Ageratina riparia), silk oak (Grevillea robusta), airplant (Kalanchoe pinnata), lantana (Lantana camara), haole koa (Leucaena leucocephala). Feral pigs and feral goats degrade the habitat. Fire, rockslides, and landslides can also damage populations.
