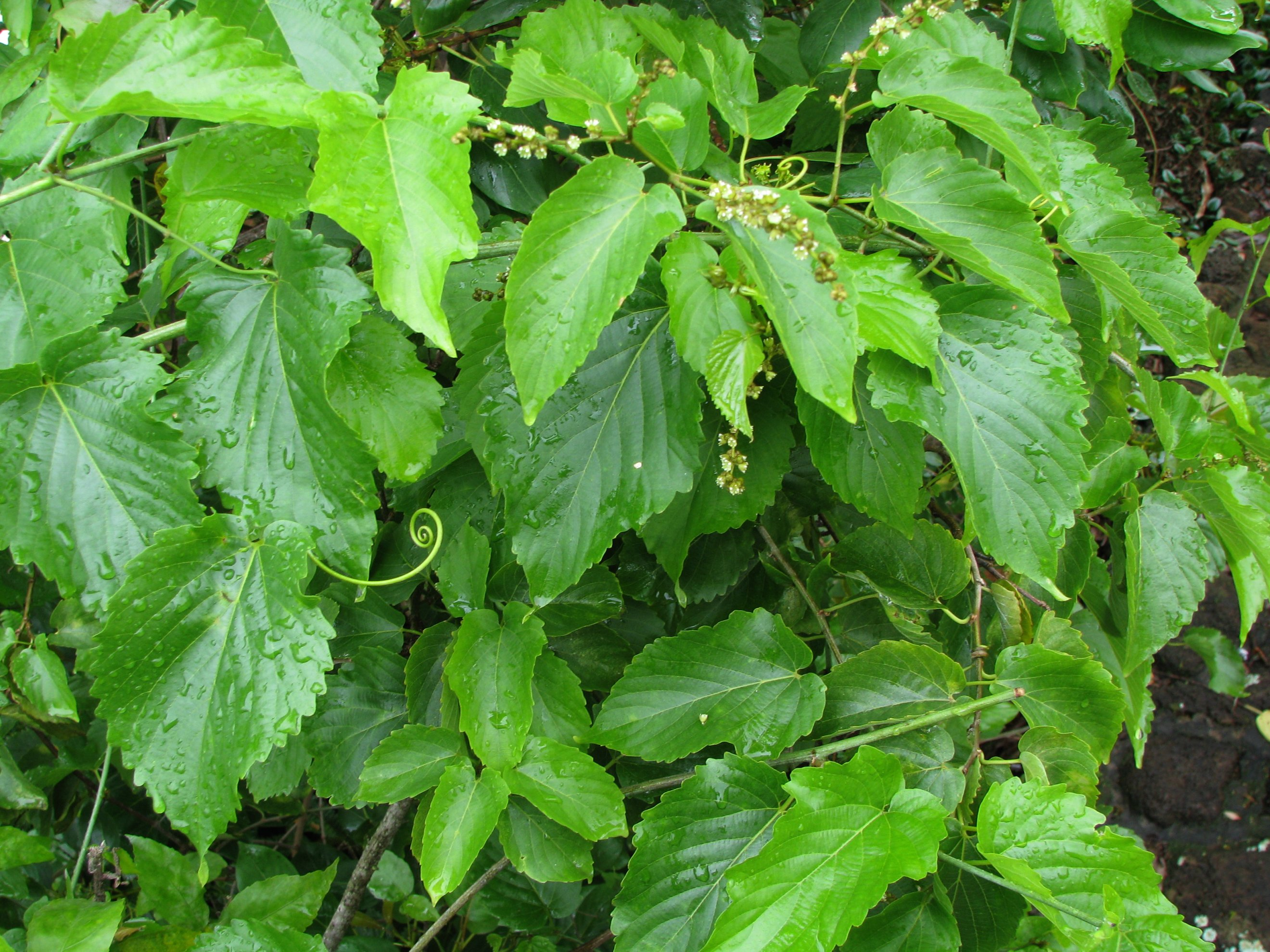

Conservation status
- Critically Endangered (IUCN 3.1)

- Endangered (ESA)

Scientific classification
- Kingdom: Plantae
- Clade: Tracheophytes
- Clade: Angiosperms
- Clade: Eudicots
- Clade: Rosids
- Order: Rosales
- Family: Rhamnaceae
- Genus: Gouania
- Species: G. vitifolia

Binomial name
- Gouania vitifolia A.Gray, 1854

= Gouania vitifolia =

Species of flowering plant

Gouania vitifolia, also known as gray Oʻahu chewstick, is a critically endangered flowering plant in the buckthorn family, Rhamnaceae that is endemic to Hawaii. There are less than 50 known remaining plants, many of which are believed to have perished in a 2018 wildfire.

== Description ==
It is a climbing shrub or woody vine with tendrils and elliptical, broadly oval leaves which have toothed margins. The leaves are covered on both sides with moderate to dense soft hairs. When in bloom, it has small white flowers.

== Distribution and habitat ==
Gouania vitifolia inhabits dry, coastal mesic, and mixed mesic forests on Oʻahu (Waiʻanae Mountains), the Island of Hawaiʻi (Kaʻū district), and west Maui. However, the only currently known populations are on O'ahu and Hawaiʻi, with no reported occurrences in Maui since the 1800s. It was thought to be extinct before its rediscovery in 1991.

== Conservation ==
In 2007 there were no more than 64 plants left on Oahu and two populations with a total "numbering in the tens" on Hawaii. A wildfire in 2018 is believed to have extinguished many of the remaining plants. Other threats include feral pigs and invasive plants.
