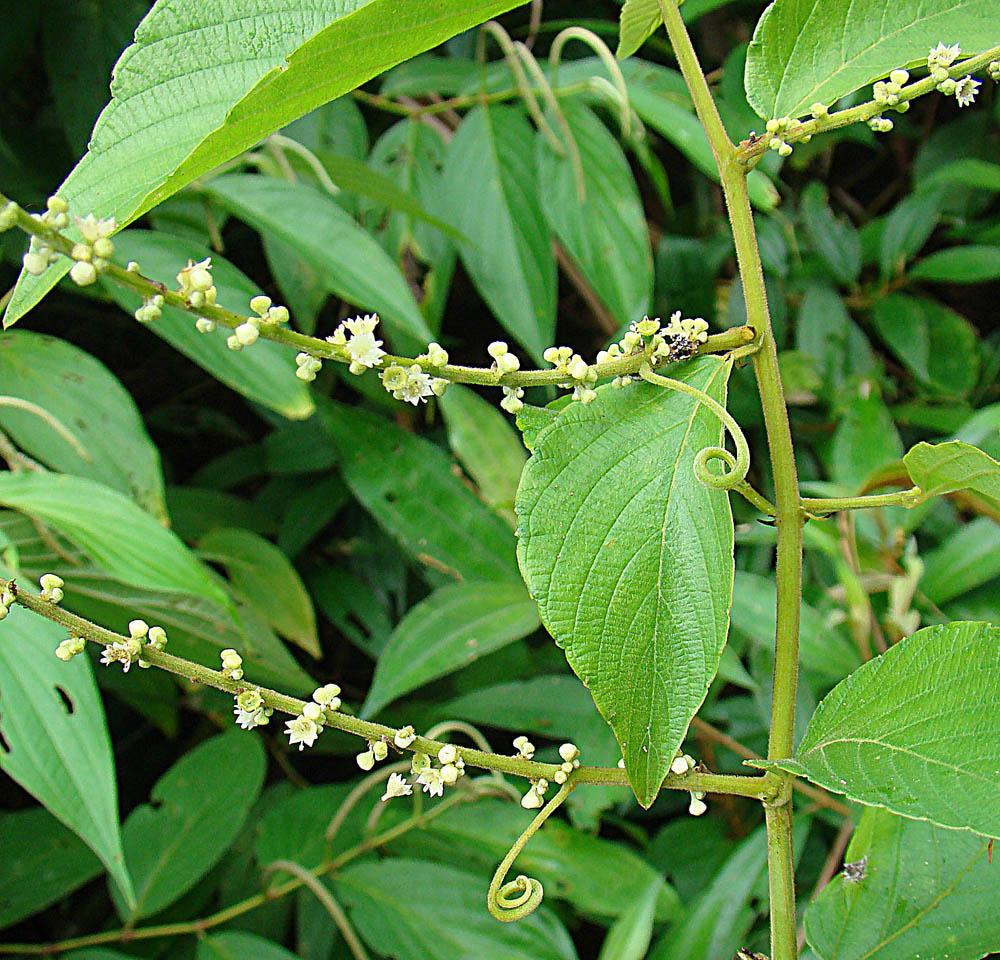

Conservation status
- Secure (NatureServe)

Scientific classification
- Kingdom: Plantae
- Clade: Tracheophytes
- Clade: Angiosperms
- Clade: Eudicots
- Clade: Rosids
- Order: Rosales
- Family: Rhamnaceae
- Genus: Gouania
- Species: G. lupuloides

Binomial name
- Gouania lupuloides (L.) Urb.

= Gouania lupuloides =

Species of plant

Gouania lupuloides, known as chewstick or whiteroot, is a neotropical plant of the family Rhamnaceae. It is occasionally used as a teeth-cleaning implement.

== Description ==
Gouania lupuloides ranges from Mexico in the north to the top of South America in the south, and to the West Indies in the west.

Gouania lupuloides is plentiful around the edges of clearings but appears only occasionally in the forest canopy. G. lupuloides flowers from November to March, usually in the early dry season; the plant does not often flower in March and rarely flowers in the rainy season. G. lupuloides can fruit as early as January, and as late as May with a peak in March and April.

== Uses ==
In Jamaican patois a vine is called a wis (wythie). To clean one's teeth with this plant one cuts off a portion of the vine, peels off the bark and chews the tip. The tip becomes fibrous and frothy. Chewstick tastes slightly bitter but not unpleasant. The plant is used to make a commercial toothpaste. Chewstick may also be used as an ingredient in Jamaican ginger beer.
