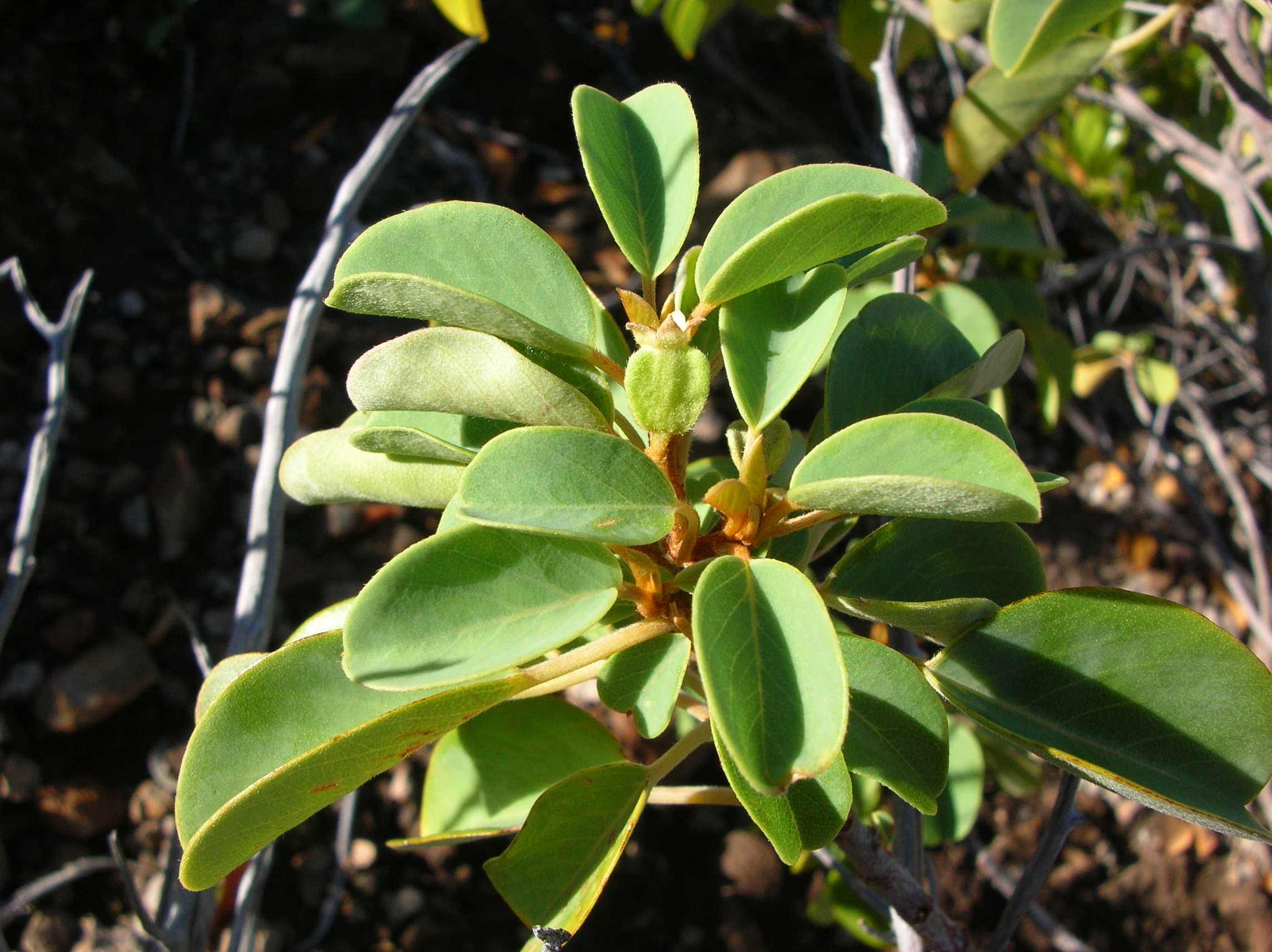
- Gouania hillebrandii

Scientific classification
- Kingdom: Plantae
- Clade: Tracheophytes
- Clade: Angiosperms
- Clade: Eudicots
- Clade: Rosids
- Order: Rosales
- Family: Rhamnaceae
- Tribe: Gouanieae
- Genus: Gouania; Jacq.

Species
- See text

Synonyms
- Pleuranthodes Weberb.

= Gouania =

Genus of flowering plants

Gouania is a genus of flowering plants in the family Rhamnaceae. The 50 to 70 species it contains are native to tropical and subtropical regions of the world, including Africa, Madagascar, the Indian Ocean islands, southern Asia, the Americas and Hawaii. They are shrubs or lianas. A revision of the species in Madagascar and the other western Indian Ocean islands is in preparation, where the genus has an important centre of diversity. The work will recognise several new species.

== Selected species ==
- Gouania corylifolia Raddi (Brazil)
- Gouania hillebrandii Oliv. ex Hillebr. (Hawaii)
- Gouania leptostachya DC. (South Asia, Southeast Asia)
- Gouania longispicata (Central Africa)
- Gouania lupuloides (L.) Urb. – chewstick or toothbrush tree (Mexico, the Caribbean, Central America, northern South America)
- Gouania meyenii Steud. – smoothfruit chewstick (Hawaii)
- Gouania napalensis Wall. (India, Nepal)
- Gouania polygama (Jacq.) Urb. (Mexico, Central and South America)
- Gouania vitifolia A.Gray – Oʻahu chewstick (Hawaii)
