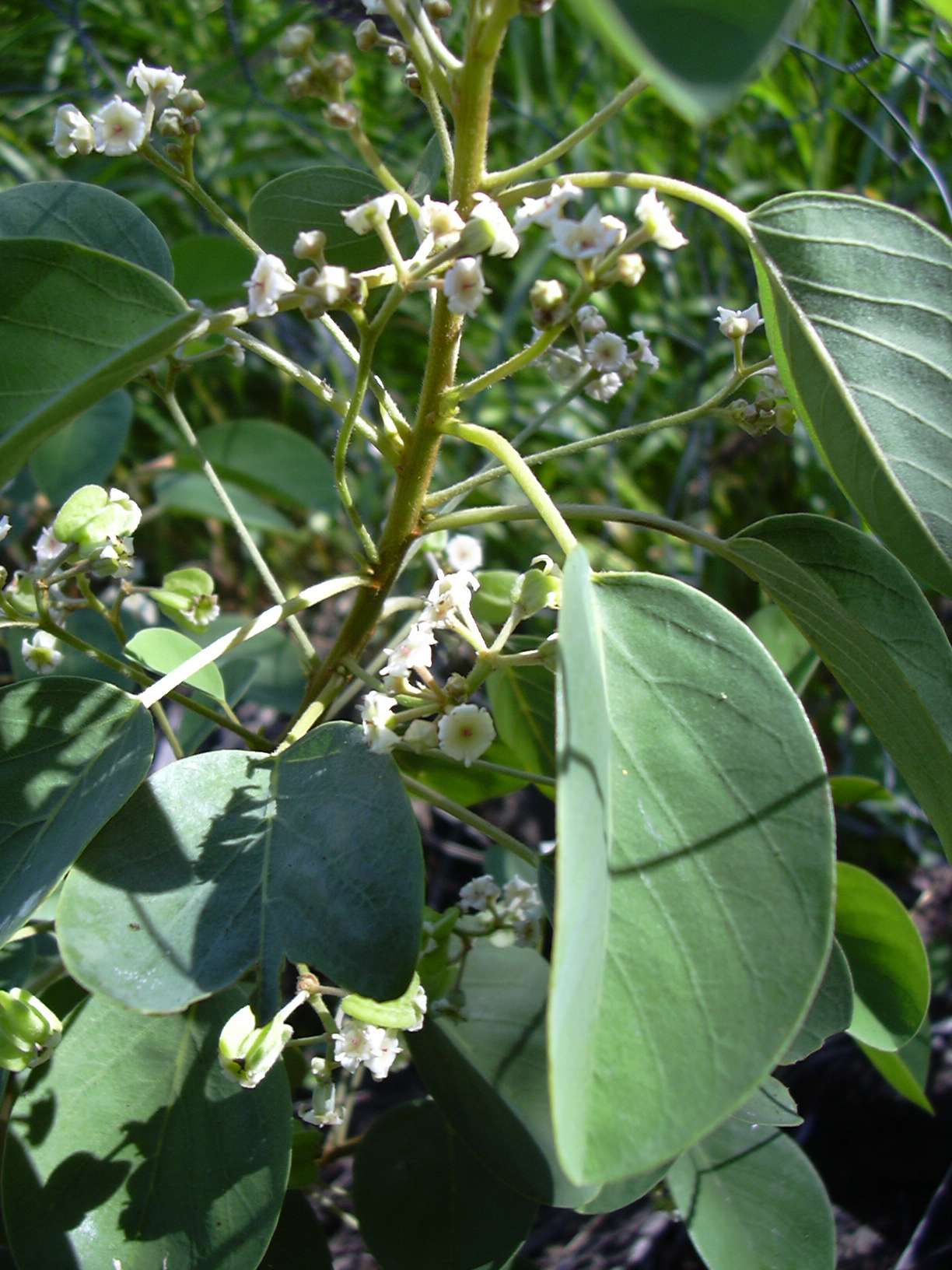

Conservation status
- Critically Endangered (IUCN 3.1)

- Critically Imperiled (NatureServe)

Scientific classification
- Kingdom: Plantae
- Clade: Tracheophytes
- Clade: Angiosperms
- Clade: Eudicots
- Clade: Rosids
- Order: Rosales
- Family: Rhamnaceae
- Genus: Gouania
- Species: G. hillebrandii

Binomial name
- Gouania hillebrandii Oliv. ex Hillebr.

= Gouania hillebrandii =

Species of flowering plant

Gouania hillebrandii, also known as hairyfruit chewstick, is an endangered species of Gouania that is endemic to Hawaii. It formerly could be found on Maui, Molokaʻi, Lānaʻi and Kahoʻolawe, but is today restricted to western Maui near Lahaina. It inhabits dry forests at elevations of 244–518 m (801–1,699 ft). Hairyfruit chewstick is a single branched shrub with small, white flowers.

The plant is federally listed as an endangered species of the United States.
