= William Hillebrand =

American physician (1821–1886)

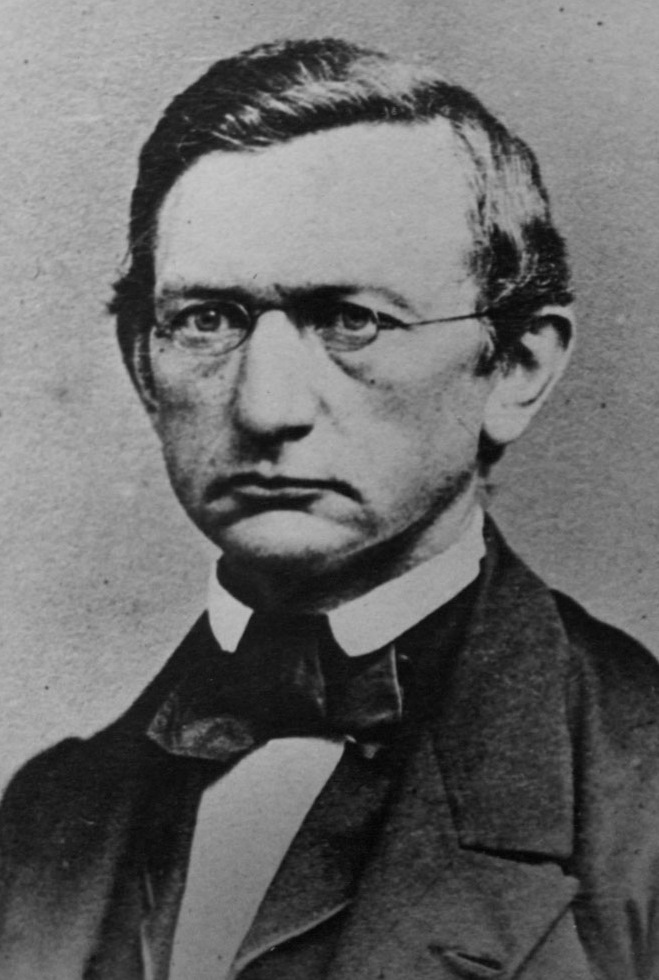
- Born: November 13, 1821; Nieheim, Westphalia, Germany
- Died: July 13, 1886 (aged 64); Heidelberg, Germany
- Scientific career
- Fields: Botany, medicine

Wilhelm or William Hillebrand (November 13, 1821 – July 13, 1886) was a German medical doctor. He practiced medicine in several countries, including the Hawaiian Islands for over 20 years. In 1850, Hillebrand lived at what is now Foster Botanical Garden in Honolulu and gained acknowledgement as a botanist.

== Life and career ==
Hillebrand was born on November 13, 1821, in Nieheim, Province of Westphalia, Prussia. His father was Judge Franz Josef Hillebrand, and mother Louise Pauline Konig. He studied medicine at Heidelberg and Berlin, and practiced at Paderborn. He sought a warmer climate to recover from a lung problem, (perhaps tuberculosis), first traveling to Australia in 1849, and then the Philippines.

Hillebrand then went to San Francisco and finally arrived in the Hawaii on December 22, 1850. He stayed for a little over 20 years and made significant contributions to local medical practice. He was able to speak the Hawaiian language as well as his native German, English, Latin, and French.

He went into practice with Dr. Wesley Newcomb, and married his stepdaughter Anna Post on November 16, 1852. In 1853, Hillebrand purchased 13 acres (53,000 m^{2}) of land from Queen Kalama, just a short distance from where he worked. He had a keen interest in plants, and over the years, planted a number of exotic and native trees in his garden.

Six years after his arrival, he and nine other Honolulu physicians petitioned to charter an organization called the Hawaiian Medical Society. Two months later, the petition was granted. Today, it is the Hawaii Medical Association. After the death of Thomas Charles Byde Rooke in 1858, he was appointed physician to the royal family of King Kamehameha IV. Hillebrand also served as chief (and only) physician at The Queen's Hospital (now The Queen's Medical Center), from 1860 to 1871. The hospital was named after Queen Emma, Dr. Rooke's adoptive daughter who was Kamehameha IV's wife.

In 1865 he was appointed to the King's Privy Council, the Board of Health, and Bureau of Immigration. In April 1865 Hillebrand traveled to Asia and the East Indies on behalf of the Hawaiian government. He had three main goals: to find sources of labor for the sugarcane plantations, to learn about the latest treatments for leprosy, and to collect and import plants and animals that would be useful to the Islands. Hillebrand wrote an article on leprosy that was published in 1883. Another European immigrant to Hawaii, Joseph Francis Charles Rock (1884–1962) would continue Hillebrand's work of identifying Hawaiian species.

Hillebrand moved back to Germany in 1871. In 1877 he arranged for the first immigrants from Portugal to come to Hawaii as plantation workers. For nearly a decade he considered returning to Hawaii. In 1880, he determined that would never happen, so sold his home to shipping entrepreneur Captain Thomas Foster and his wife Mary, who lived on an adjacent lot. Years later, Mary Foster bequeathed the land to the city, which opened it to the public as Foster Botanical Garden in 1930.

He died July 13, 1886, in Heidelberg. He is the father of William Francis Hillebrand (1853–1925), an American chemist.

== Awards and honors ==
- Many plants are named in his honor, including the genus Hillebrandia, Diospyros hillebrandii, Gouania hillebrandii, Lobelia hillebrandii, Lysimachia hillebrandii, Pritchardia hillebrandii, Dubautia linearis subsp. hillebrandii, Sicyos hillebrandii, Cyperus hillebrandii, Geranium hillebrandii, and Phyllostegia hillebrandii, all endemic to Hawaii, and Veronica hillebrandii and Phebalium hillebrandii from Australia.

== Publications and Botanical Legacy ==
Hillebrand authored the following work: William Hillebrand (1888). Flora of the Hawaiian Islands: a description of their phanerogams and vascular cryptogams. Williams & Norgate.

Specimens collected by Hillebrand are cared for at herbaria worldwide, including the National Herbarium of Victoria (MEL), Royal Botanic Gardens Victoria, the Natural History Museum of the United Kingdom, the Peabody Museum of Natural History and the Royal Botanic Gardens Edinburgh.
