= Kauai schiedea =

Kauai schiedea is a common name for several plants and may refer to:

- Schiedea apokremnos
- Schiedea kauaiensis
