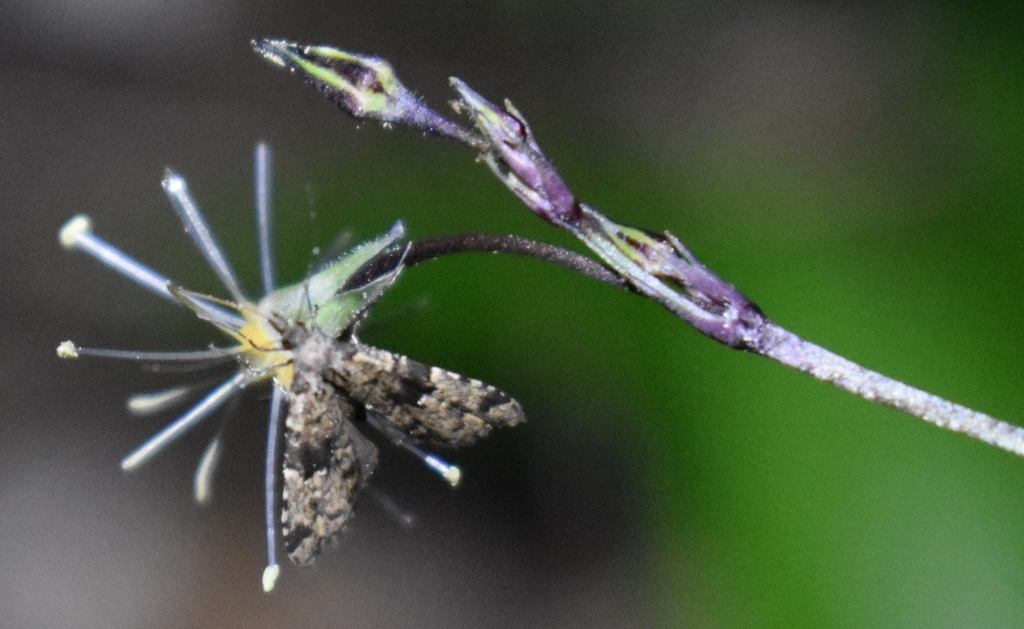

Scientific classification
- Kingdom: Animalia
- Phylum: Arthropoda
- Clade: Pancrustacea
- Class: Insecta
- Order: Lepidoptera
- Superfamily: Noctuoidea
- Family: Erebidae
- Genus: Pseudoschrankia
- Species: P. brevipalpis

Binomial name
- Pseudoschrankia brevipalpis Medeiros, 2015

= Pseudoschrankia brevipalpis =

Species of moth

Pseudoschrankia brevipalpis is a species of moth in the genus Pseudoschrankia, endemic to Oahu in the Hawaiian Islands. It is a pollinator of Schiedea kaalae.
