= Schiedea sarmentosa =

Conservation status
- Critically Imperiled (NatureServe)

Scientific classification
- Kingdom: Plantae
- Clade: Tracheophytes
- Clade: Angiosperms
- Clade: Eudicots
- Order: Caryophyllales
- Family: Caryophyllaceae
- Genus: Schiedea
- Species: S. sarmentosa

Binomial name
- Schiedea sarmentosa O.Deg. & Sherff

Species of flowering plant

Schiedea sarmentosa is a rare species of flowering plant in the family Caryophyllaceae known by the common name cliff schiedea. It is endemic to Hawaii, where it is known only from the island of Molokai. It is threatened by the degradation and destruction of its habitat. It is a federally listed endangered species of the United States.

This plant is a subshrub with many branches reaching 30 to 45 centimeters tall. It has very narrow, threadlike leaves up to 4.5 centimeters long oppositely arranged on the branches. The plant produces many inflorescences of flowers with green sepals and no petals. It grows in dry and moist forest habitat, sometimes on cliff faces. Other plants in the habitat include Schiedea lydgatei (Lydgate's schiedea), Styphelia tameiameiae (pukiawe), Chenopodium oahuensis (’aheahea), Alyxia oliviformis (maile), Dracaena sp. (hala pepe), and Chamaesyce sp. (’akoko).

There are two populations of this plant for a total of not more than 1000 individuals.
