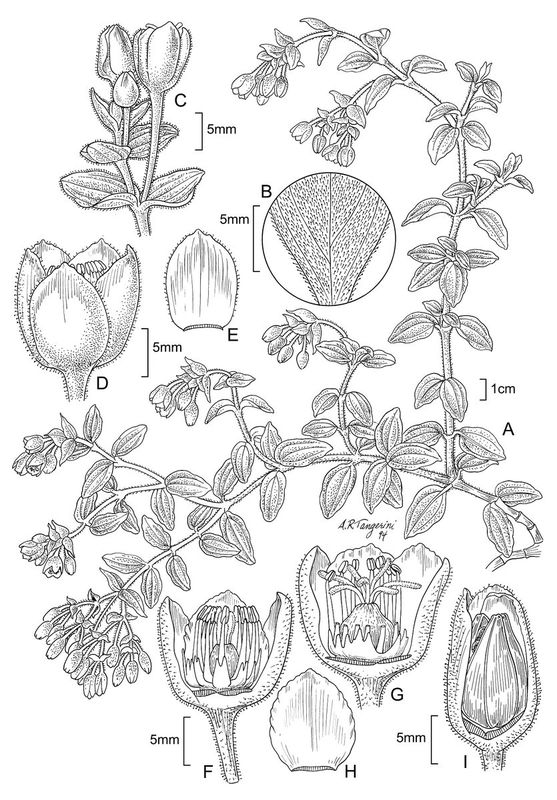

Conservation status
- Critically Endangered (IUCN 3.1)

Scientific classification
- Kingdom: Plantae
- Clade: Embryophytes
- Clade: Tracheophytes
- Clade: Spermatophytes
- Clade: Angiosperms
- Clade: Eudicots
- Order: Caryophyllales
- Family: Caryophyllaceae
- Genus: Schiedea
- Species: S. viscosa

Binomial name
- Schiedea viscosa H.Mann (1866)

Synonyms
- Homotypic Synonyms: Alsinidendron viscosum (H.Mann) Sherff; Heterotypic Synonyms: Alsinidendron viscosum var. laeve Sherff; Schiedea viscosa var. laevis (Sherff) H.St.John

= Schiedea viscosa =

Species of flowering plant

Schiedea viscosa is a species of flowering plant in the family Caryophyllaceae. It is sometimes referred to by the common name climbing alsinidendron. It is endemic to lowland and montane moist forests on Kauai in the Hawaiian Islands. It is threatened by habitat loss.
