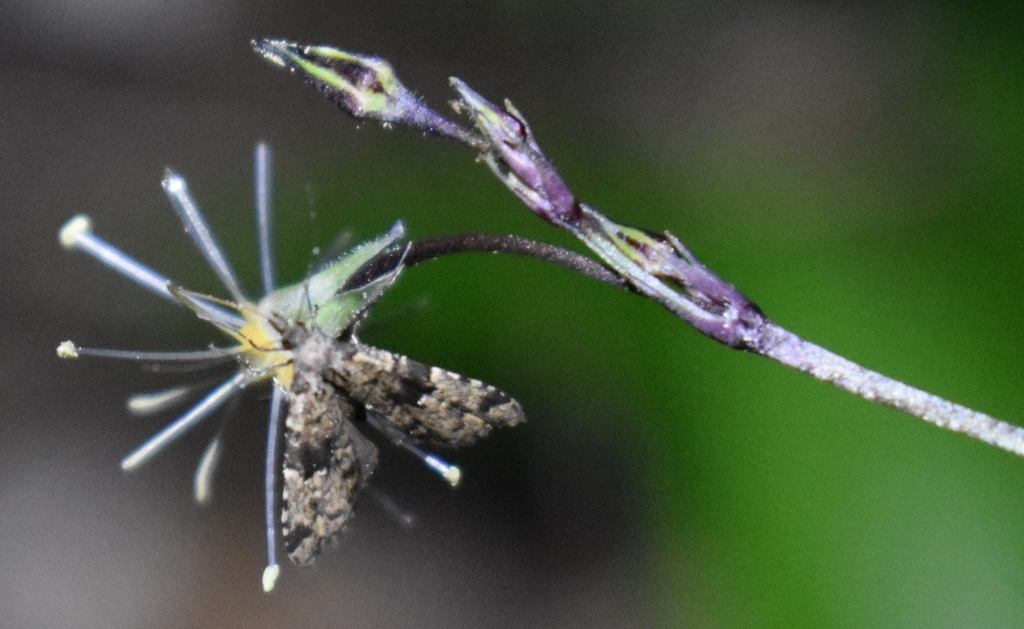

Scientific classification
- Kingdom: Animalia
- Phylum: Arthropoda
- Clade: Pancrustacea
- Class: Insecta
- Order: Lepidoptera
- Superfamily: Noctuoidea
- Family: Erebidae
- Subfamily: Hypeninae
- Genus: Pseudoschrankia; Zimmerman, 1958

= Pseudoschrankia =

Genus of moths

Pseudoschrankia is a Hawai‘ian genus of moths of the family Erebidae.

== Species ==
- Pseudoschrankia cyanias (Meyrick, 1899)
- Pseudoschrankia epichalca (Meyrick, 1899)
- Pseudoschrankia leptoxantha (Meyrick, 1904)
- Pseudoschrankia brevipalpis Medeiros, 2015
