= Pseudoschrankia epichalca =

Scientific classification
- Kingdom: Animalia
- Phylum: Arthropoda
- Class: Insecta
- Order: Lepidoptera
- Superfamily: Noctuoidea
- Family: Erebidae
- Genus: Pseudoschrankia
- Species: P. epichalca

Binomial name
- Pseudoschrankia epichalca (Meyrick, 1899)

Synonyms
- Hypenodes epichalca Meyrick, 1899

Species of moth

Pseudoschrankia epichalca is a moth of the family Noctuidae. It was first described by Edward Meyrick in 1899. It is endemic to the island of Hawaii.

It has a variable black and yellow pattern.
