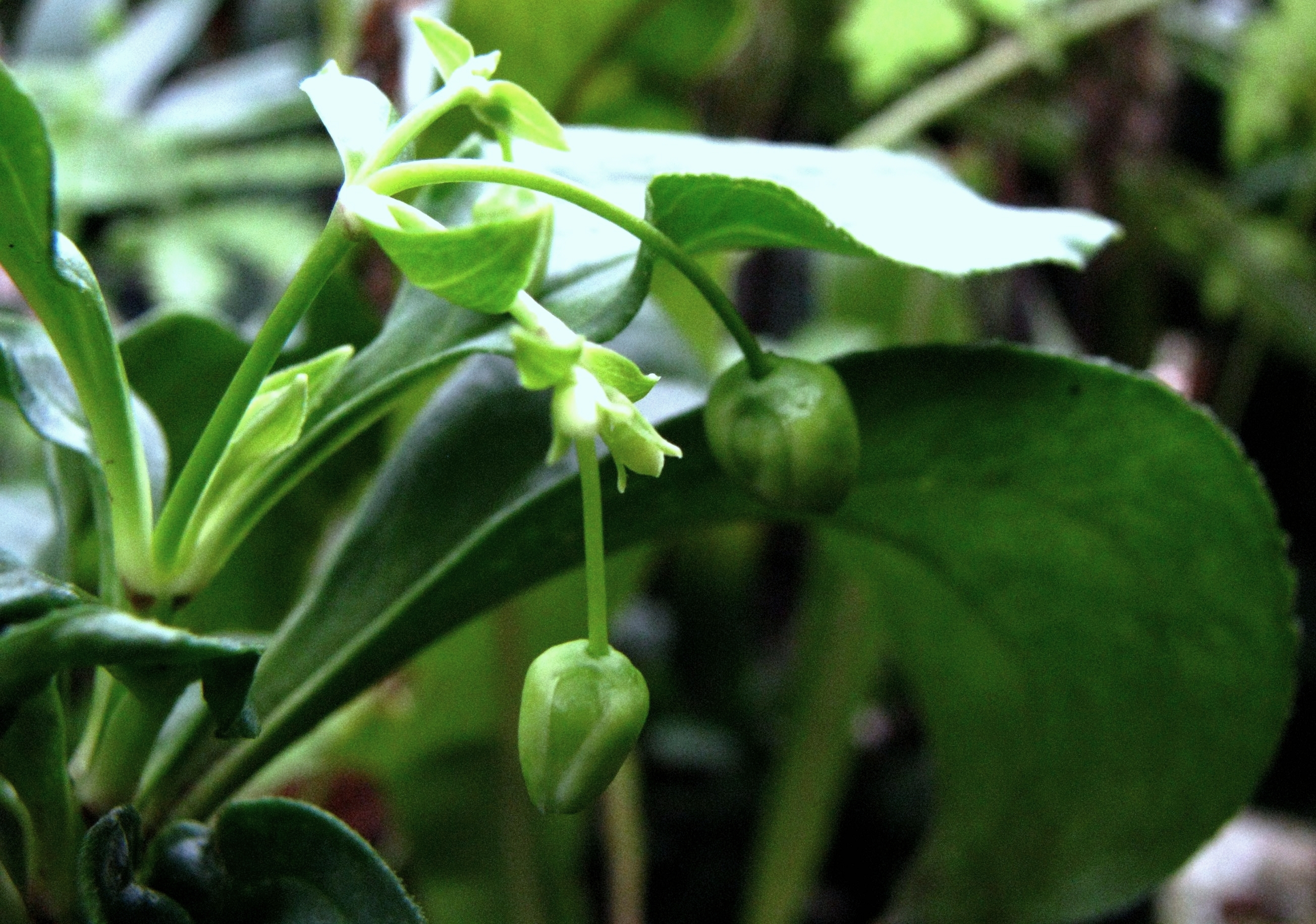

Conservation status
- Critically Endangered (IUCN 3.1)

Scientific classification
- Kingdom: Plantae
- Clade: Tracheophytes
- Clade: Angiosperms
- Clade: Eudicots
- Order: Caryophyllales
- Family: Caryophyllaceae
- Genus: Schiedea
- Species: S. trinervis

Binomial name
- Schiedea trinervis (H.Mann) Pax & K.Hoffm. (1934)

Synonyms
- Alsinidendron trinerve H.Mann (1866)

= Schiedea trinervis =

Species of flowering plant

Schiedea trinervis is a species of flowering plant in the family Caryophyllaceae. It is called three nerved alsinidendron and is endemic to island of Oʻahu in Hawaii. It is a subshrub, reaching a height of 30–80 cm (12–31 in).

Three-nerved alsinidendron inhabits mixed mesic and wet forests on the slopes of the Waiʻanae Range at elevations of 900–1,230 m (2,950–4,040 ft). Associated plants include pilo (Coprosma spp.), ʻapeʻape (Gunnera petaloidea), ʻalani (Melicope spp.), hāpuʻu (Cibotium spp.), hame (Antidesma platyphyllum), and māmaki (Pipturus albidus). It is threatened by habitat loss.
