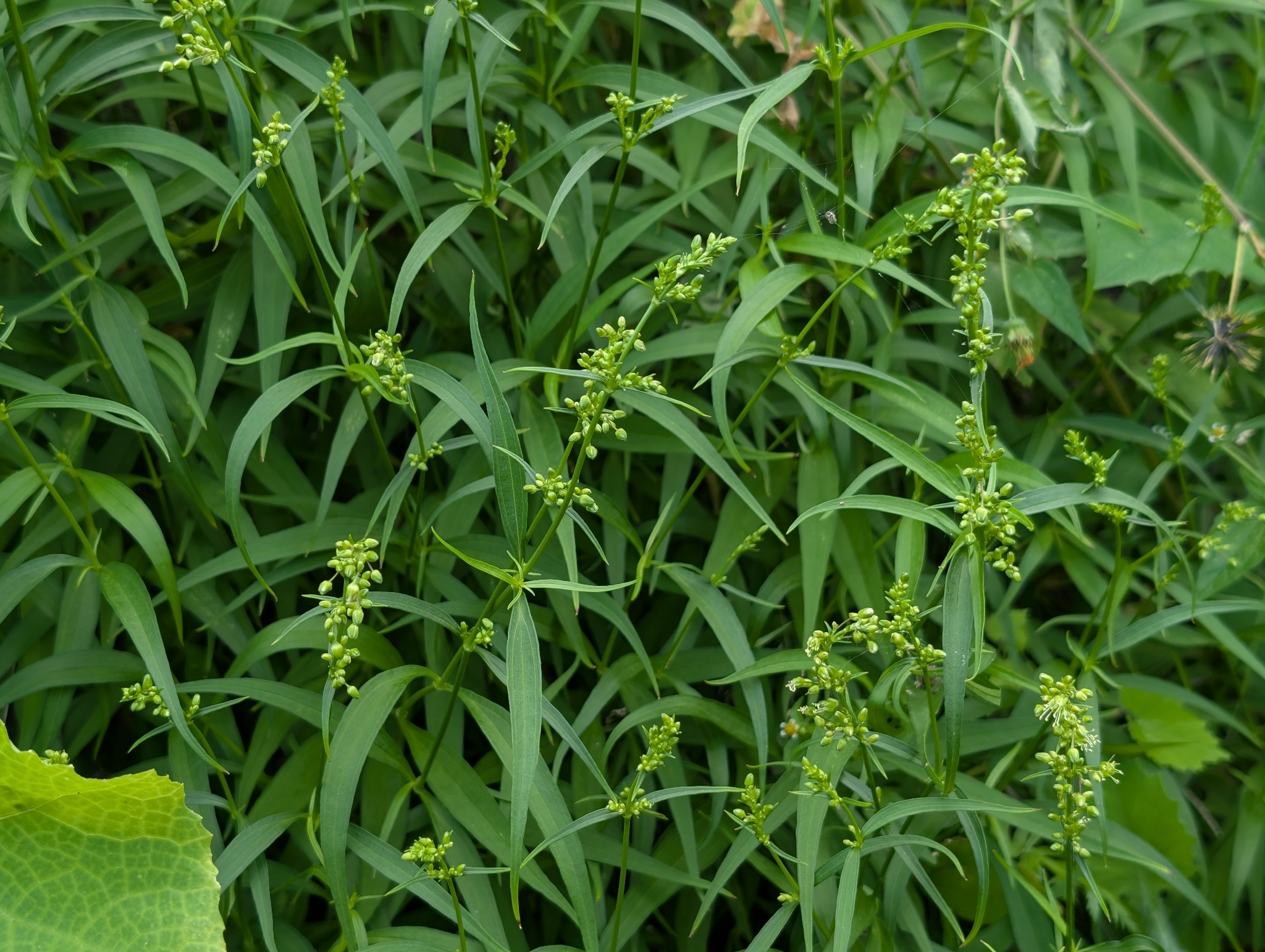

Conservation status
- Critically Imperiled (NatureServe)

Scientific classification
- Kingdom: Plantae
- Clade: Embryophytes
- Clade: Tracheophytes
- Clade: Spermatophytes
- Clade: Angiosperms
- Clade: Eudicots
- Order: Caryophyllales
- Family: Caryophyllaceae
- Genus: Schiedea
- Species: S. kealiae

Binomial name
- Schiedea kealiae Caum & Hosaka

= Schiedea kealiae =

Species of flowering plant

Schiedea kealiae is a rare species of flowering plant in the family Caryophyllaceae known by the common name Waianae Range schiedea. It is endemic to Hawaii, where it is known only from the Waianae Range on the island of Oahu. It is threatened by the degradation and destruction of its habitat. It was federally listed as an endangered species of the United States in 1996.

This plant is a subshrub with woody-based, hairless branches up to half a meter long. The oppositely arranged leaves have narrow, dark green blades up to 8 centimeters long by 1.1 wide. The inflorescence is a branching cluster of flowers with small green sepals and no petals.

This plant is now limited to three populations containing 300 to 500 individuals in the Waianae Mountains of Oahu. The populations are threatened by the invasion of introduced species of plants into its habitat.
