= Schiedea helleri =

Conservation status
- Critically Imperiled (NatureServe)

Scientific classification
- Kingdom: Plantae
- Clade: Tracheophytes
- Clade: Angiosperms
- Clade: Eudicots
- Order: Caryophyllales
- Family: Caryophyllaceae
- Genus: Schiedea
- Species: S. helleri

Binomial name
- Schiedea helleri Sherff

Species of flowering plant

Schiedea helleri is a rare species of flowering plant in the family Caryophyllaceae known by the common names Heller's schiedea and Kaholuamanu schiedea. It is endemic to Hawaii, where it is known only from the island of Kauai. It is threatened by the degradation of its habitat. It was federally listed as an endangered species of the United States in 1996.

This plant is a vine growing at least 15 centimeters long. The oppositely arranged leaves have thick blades up to 14 centimeters long by 6 wide and are mostly hairless in texture, except for a few hairs near the edges. The inflorescence is a branching cluster of flowers. The plant is easily distinguished from other Schiedea on Kauai, which are not vines.

This plant was thought to be extinct until it was rediscovered in 1993. It occurs in wet forest habitat near a stream at the edge of Alakai Wilderness Preserve. By 2010 there were two populations containing up to 101 plants.
