= Schiedea spergulina =

Conservation status
- Imperiled (NatureServe)

Scientific classification
- Kingdom: Plantae
- Clade: Tracheophytes
- Clade: Angiosperms
- Clade: Eudicots
- Order: Caryophyllales
- Family: Caryophyllaceae
- Genus: Schiedea
- Species: S. spergulina

Binomial name
- Schiedea spergulina A.Gray

Species of flowering plant

Schiedea spergulina is a rare species of flowering plant in the family Caryophyllaceae known by the common name canyon schiedea and spreading schiedea. It is endemic to Hawaii, where it is known only from the island of Kauai. It is threatened by the degradation and destruction of its habitat. There are two varieties of this plant, one federally listed as an endangered species of the United States, and the other listed threatened.

This plant is a subshrub growing erect to a maximum height around 60 centimeters.

The var. leiopoda is known from a single population containing no more than 325 individuals, including immature plants and seedlings. The var. spergulina exists in six populations with up to 585 individuals.

The two varieties are distinguished mainly by the amount of hairs they have, and by geography. These varieties are sometimes combined so that the plants are considered all one species without subtaxa.
