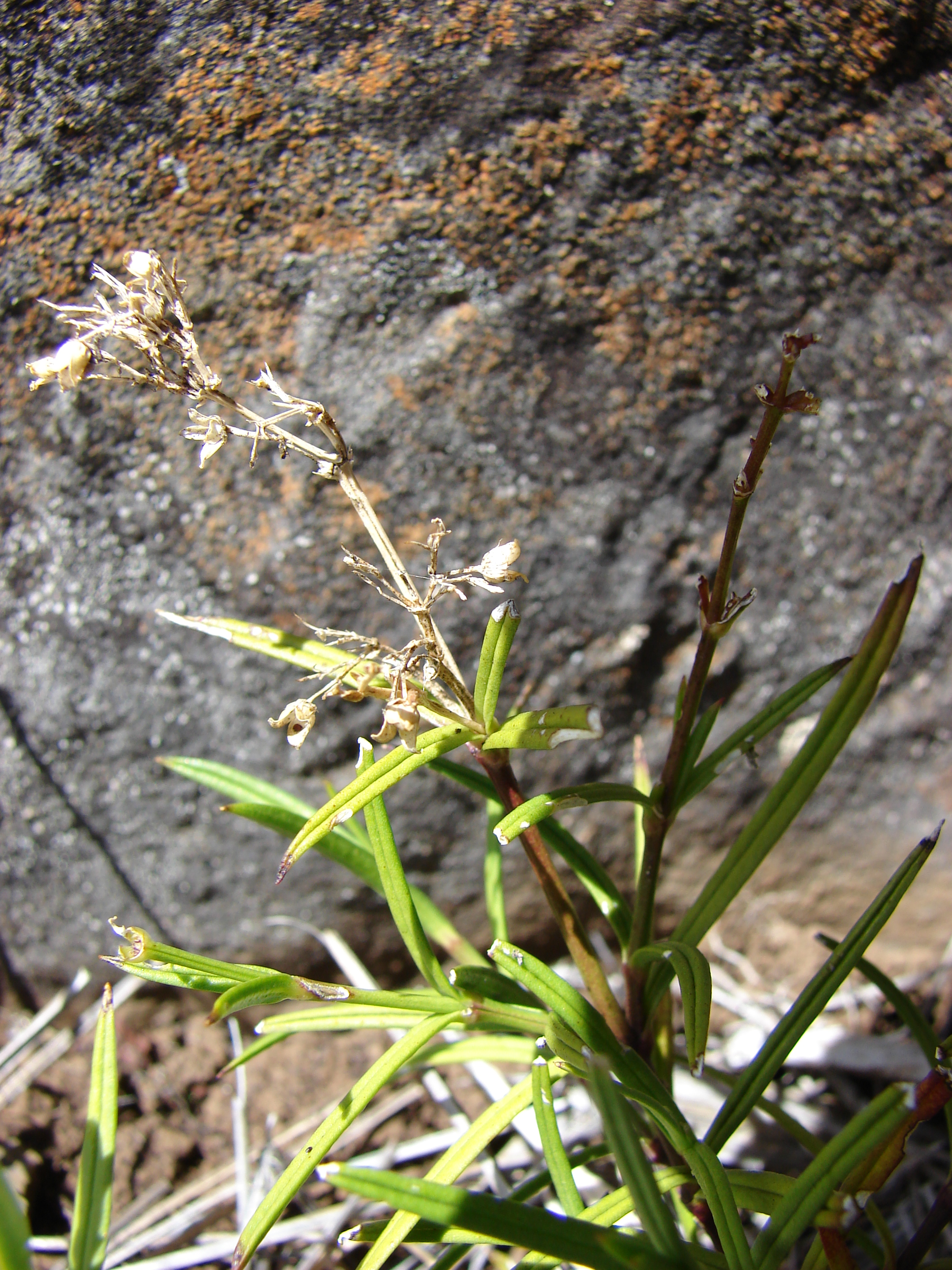

Conservation status
- Critically Imperiled (NatureServe)

Scientific classification
- Kingdom: Plantae
- Clade: Tracheophytes
- Clade: Angiosperms
- Clade: Eudicots
- Order: Caryophyllales
- Family: Caryophyllaceae
- Genus: Schiedea
- Species: S. haleakalensis

Binomial name
- Schiedea haleakalensis O.Deg. & Sherff

= Schiedea haleakalensis =

Species of flowering plant

Schiedea haleakalensis is a rare species of flowering plant in the family Caryophyllaceae known by the common name Haleakalā schiedea. It is endemic to Hawaii, where it is known only from Haleakalā National Park on the island of Maui. It is threatened by the degradation of its habitat. It was federally listed as an endangered species of the United States in 1992. Its native habitat includes dry subalpine cliffs with native shrubs.

This plant is a shrub growing up 30 to 60 centimeters tall. The leaves have narrow blades measuring up to 8 centimeters long but just a few millimeters in width. The inflorescence is a cluster of flowers with tiny green sepals and no petals.

This shrub is known from two locations in Haleakalā National Park; it is named for the volcano Haleakalā. It has been threatened by the presence of feral goats in its habitat, but most of these have been excluded.
