= Pseudoschrankia cyanias =

Scientific classification
- Kingdom: Animalia
- Phylum: Arthropoda
- Class: Insecta
- Order: Lepidoptera
- Superfamily: Noctuoidea
- Family: Erebidae
- Genus: Pseudoschrankia
- Species: P. cyanias

Binomial name
- Pseudoschrankia cyanias (Meyrick, 1899)

Synonyms
- Hypenodes cyanias Meyrick, 1899

Species of moth

Pseudoschrankia cyanias is a moth of the family Noctuidae. It was first described by Edward Meyrick in 1899. It is endemic to the island of Hawaii.
