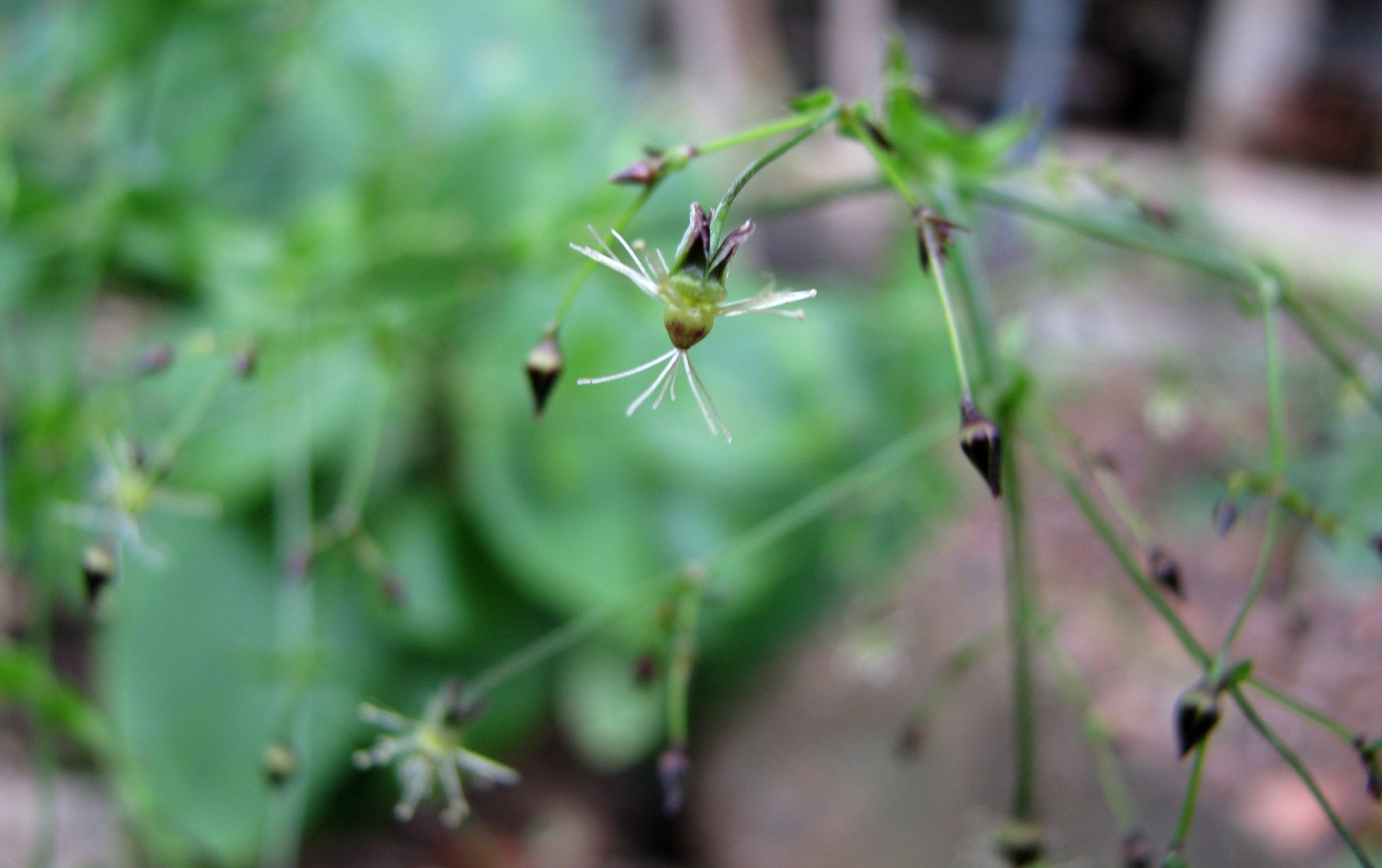

Conservation status
- Critically Imperiled (NatureServe)

Scientific classification
- Kingdom: Plantae
- Clade: Tracheophytes
- Clade: Angiosperms
- Clade: Eudicots
- Order: Caryophyllales
- Family: Caryophyllaceae
- Genus: Schiedea
- Species: S. membranacea

Binomial name
- Schiedea membranacea H.St.John

= Schiedea membranacea =

Species of flowering plant

Schiedea membranacea is a rare species of flowering plant in the pink family known by the common name papery schiedea and membranous schiedea. It is endemic to Hawaii, where it is known only from the island of Kauai. It is threatened by the degradation and destruction of its habitat. It is a federally listed endangered species of the United States.

This plant is a perennial herb growing from a woody caudex. The stem grows up to a meter long and has no branches. The species grows in moist and wet forest habitat, often on steep cliffs.

Populations of the plant have declined. In 1996 there were six populations of the plant totalling at least 250 individuals. In 2010 there were five populations with fewer than 90 plants. Threats to the species include feral goats, feral pigs, introduced species of plants, and garlic snails (Oxychilus alliarius).
