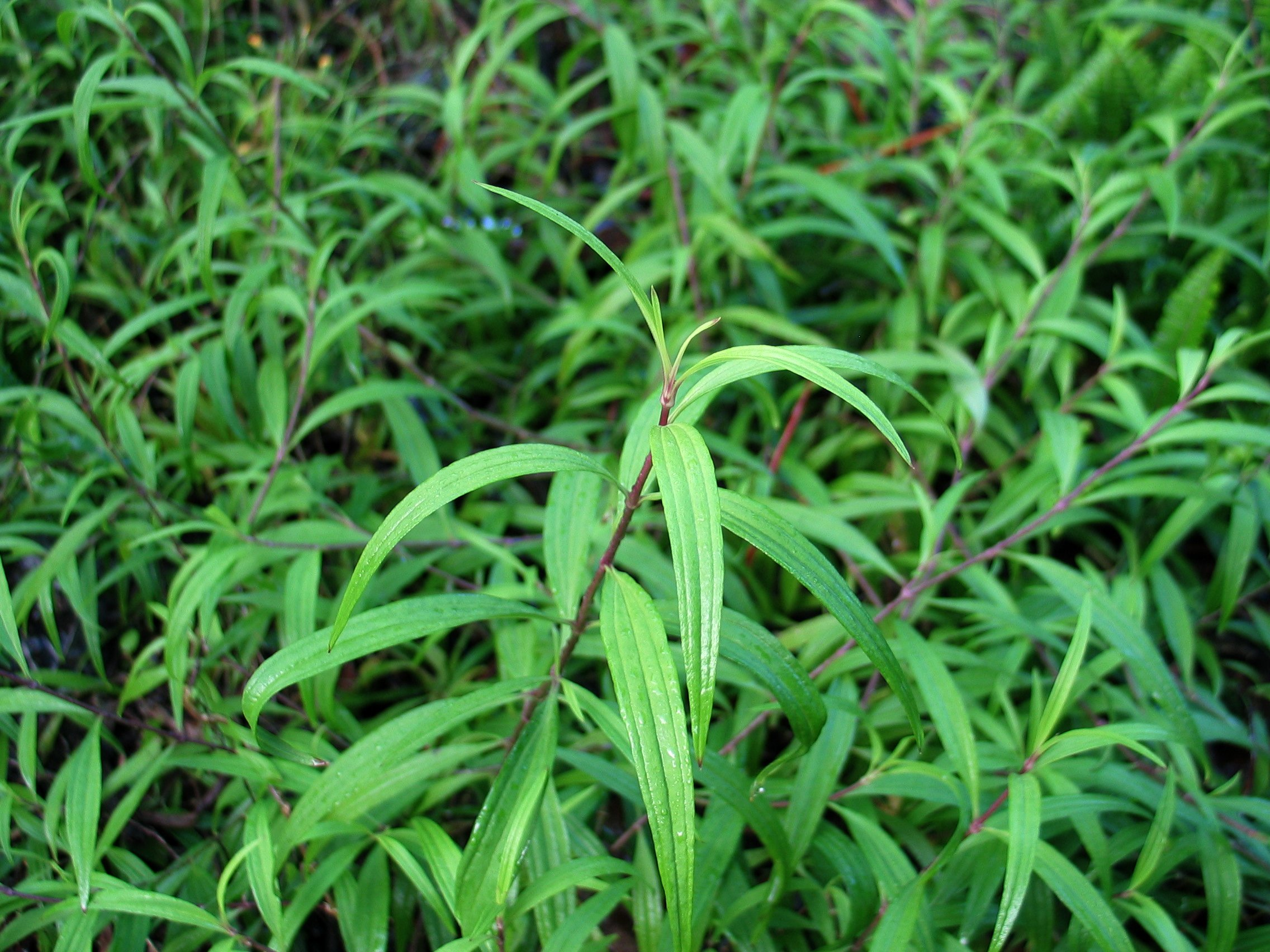

Conservation status
- Critically Imperiled (NatureServe)

Scientific classification
- Kingdom: Plantae
- Clade: Tracheophytes
- Clade: Angiosperms
- Clade: Eudicots
- Order: Caryophyllales
- Family: Caryophyllaceae
- Genus: Schiedea
- Species: S. hookeri

Binomial name
- Schiedea hookeri A.Gray

= Schiedea hookeri =

Species of flowering plant

Schiedea hookeri is a rare species of flowering plant in the family Caryophyllaceae known by the common names Hooker's schiedea and sprawling schiedea. It is endemic to Hawaii, where it is known only from the island of Oahu. It is thought to have been extirpated from Haleakalā on Maui. It is threatened by the degradation and destruction of its habitat. It was federally listed as an endangered species of the United States in 1996.

This plant is a shrub growing 30 to 50 centimeters long, taking a creeping, sprawling form or a more clumpy form. The oppositely arranged leaves have thin blades up to 8 centimeters long by 1.5 wide. The inflorescence is a hairy, sticky cluster of flowers with small green or purple sepals and no petals.

This plant is now limited to the Waianae Range on the island of Oahu. There are about 11 populations totalling no more than about 330 individuals. The habitat is dry to moist forest. It is threatened by damage to the habitat by feral goats and pigs and by the invasion of introduced species of plants.
