= Pseudoschrankia leptoxantha =

Scientific classification
- Kingdom: Animalia
- Phylum: Arthropoda
- Class: Insecta
- Order: Lepidoptera
- Superfamily: Noctuoidea
- Family: Erebidae
- Genus: Pseudoschrankia
- Species: P. leptoxantha

Binomial name
- Pseudoschrankia leptoxantha (Meyrick, 1904)

Synonyms
- Hypenodes leptoxantha Meyrick, 1904

Species of moth

Pseudoschrankia leptoxantha is a moth of the family Noctuidae. It was first described by Edward Meyrick in 1904. It is endemic to the Hawaiian island of Molokai.
