= Schiedea stellarioides =

Conservation status
- Critically Imperiled (NatureServe)

- Critically Endangered (IUCN 3.1)

Scientific classification
- Kingdom: Plantae
- Clade: Tracheophytes
- Clade: Angiosperms
- Clade: Eudicots
- Order: Caryophyllales
- Family: Caryophyllaceae
- Genus: Schiedea
- Species: S. stellarioides

Binomial name
- Schiedea stellarioides H.Mann

Synonyms
- Heterotypic Synonyms: Schiedea stellarioides var. brevifolia Sherff; Schiedea stellarioides var. hillebrandii Hochr.; Schiedea stellarioides var. implexoides Sherff; Schiedea stellarioides var. longifolia Sherff

Species of flowering plant

Schiedea stellarioides is a species of rare flowering plant in the family Caryophyllaceae. It is known by the common name lau lihilihi. It is endemic to Hawaii, where it is known only from the island of Kauai. It is threatened by the degradation and destruction of its habitat. The plant is federally listed as an endangered species of the United States.

This plant is a sprawling or somewhat erect subshrub growing to a maximum height around 60 centimeters. It grows in moist forest habitat.

This species was once thought to be extinct; it was rediscovered in the 1990s. There are small populations remaining for a total of perhaps a few hundred individuals.
