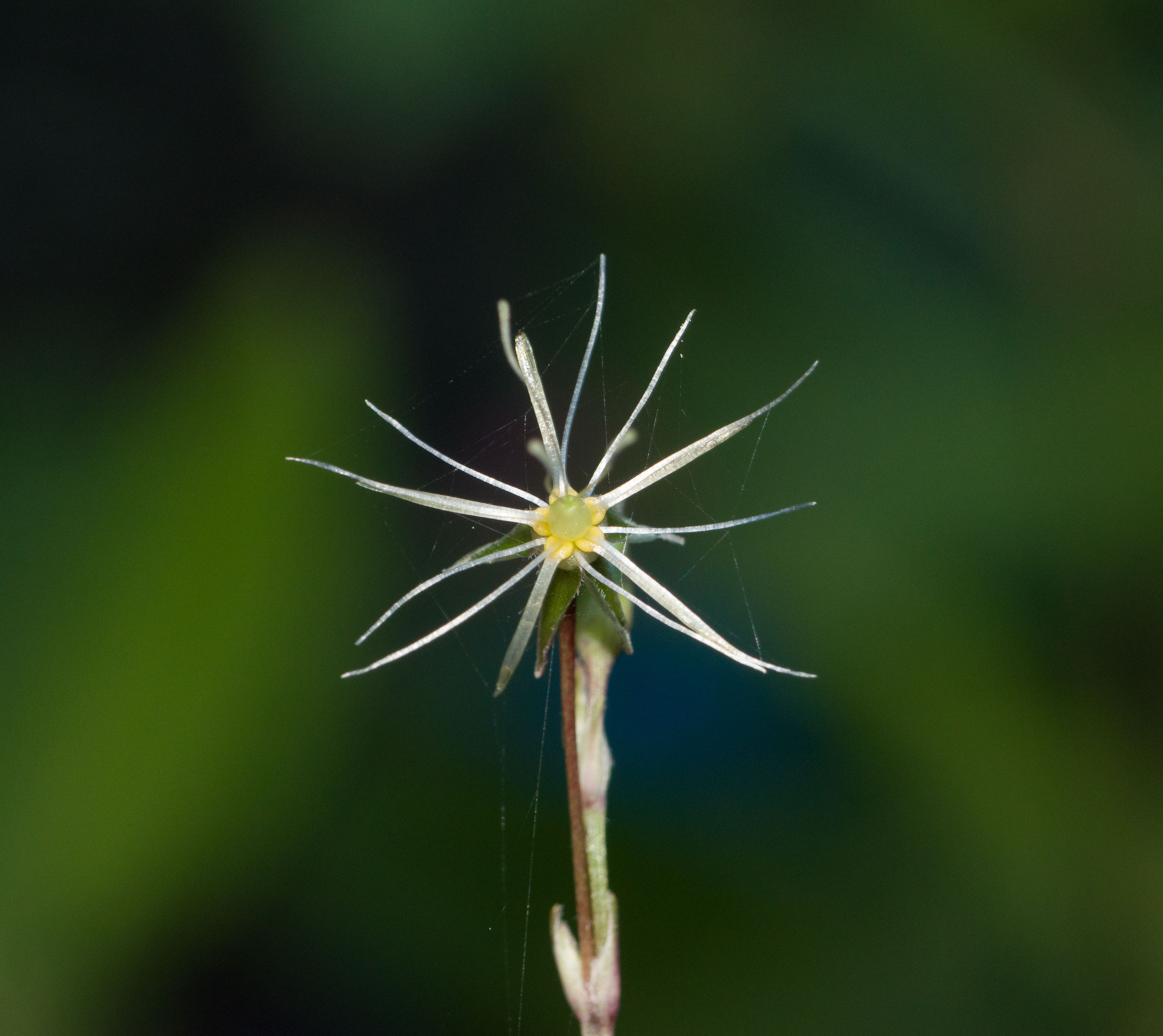
- Flower of Schiedea nuttallii

Conservation status
- Critically Imperiled (NatureServe)

Scientific classification
- Kingdom: Plantae
- Clade: Tracheophytes
- Clade: Angiosperms
- Clade: Eudicots
- Order: Caryophyllales
- Family: Caryophyllaceae
- Genus: Schiedea
- Species: S. nuttallii

Binomial name
- Schiedea nuttallii Hook.

= Schiedea nuttallii =

Species of flowering plant

Schiedea nuttallii is a rare species of flowering plant in the family Caryophyllaceae known by the common name valley schiedea. It is endemic to Hawaii, where it is known only from the island of Oahu. It has been extirpated from Maui and Molokai. Plants in a population known from Kauai are actually members of other species. Thus, the species is now endemic to Oahu. It is threatened by the degradation and destruction of its habitat. It is a federally listed endangered species of the United States.

This plant is a subshrub growing 30 centimeters to nearly 2 meters tall. It grows in moist forest habitat.

As of 2007, there is only one population of this species which includes 19 mature individuals plus a number of immature and reintroduced individuals. Conservation efforts include propagation of new plants from tissue culture.
