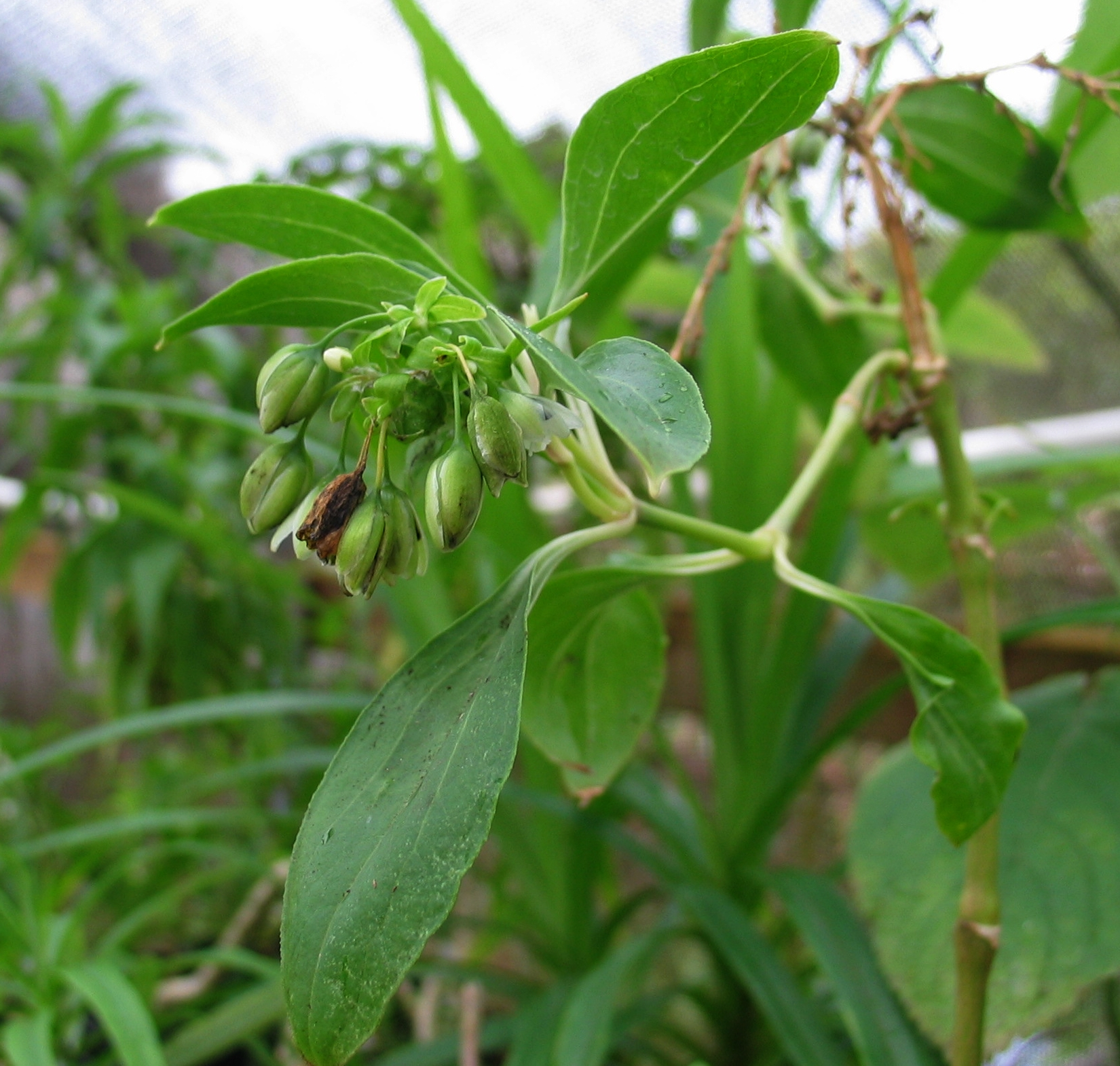

Conservation status
- Critically Endangered (IUCN 3.1)

Scientific classification
- Kingdom: Plantae
- Clade: Tracheophytes
- Clade: Angiosperms
- Clade: Eudicots
- Order: Caryophyllales
- Family: Caryophyllaceae
- Genus: Schiedea
- Species: S. obovata

Binomial name
- Schiedea obovata (Sherff) W.L.Wagner & Weller (2005)

Synonyms
- Alsinidendron obovatum Sherff (1951); Alsinidendron obovatum var. parvifolium O.Deg. & Sherff (1951)

= Schiedea obovata =

Species of flowering plant

Schiedea obovata is a species of flowering plant in the family Caryophyllaceae. It is a shrub endemic to the island of Oahu in the Hawaiian Islands, where it grows in lowland moist forests from 550 to 800 meters elevation. There are only 38 plants in the single known population, and the species is assessed as Critically Endangered. It is threatened by habitat loss.
