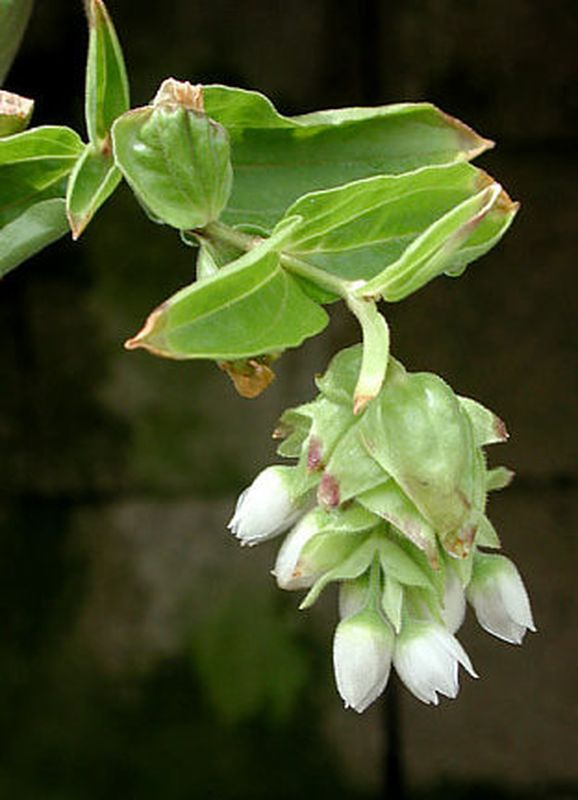

Conservation status
- Critically Endangered (IUCN 3.1)

Scientific classification
- Kingdom: Plantae
- Clade: Embryophytes
- Clade: Tracheophytes
- Clade: Spermatophytes
- Clade: Angiosperms
- Clade: Eudicots
- Order: Caryophyllales
- Family: Caryophyllaceae
- Genus: Schiedea
- Species: S. lychnoides

Binomial name
- Schiedea lychnoides Hillebr. (1888)

Synonyms
- Alsinidendron lychnoides (Hillebr.) Sherff (1944)

= Schiedea lychnoides =

Species of flowering plant

Scheidea lychnoides is a species of plant in the family Caryophyllaceae. It is endemic to dry forests and low shrublands in Hawaiʻi. It is threatened by habitat loss.
