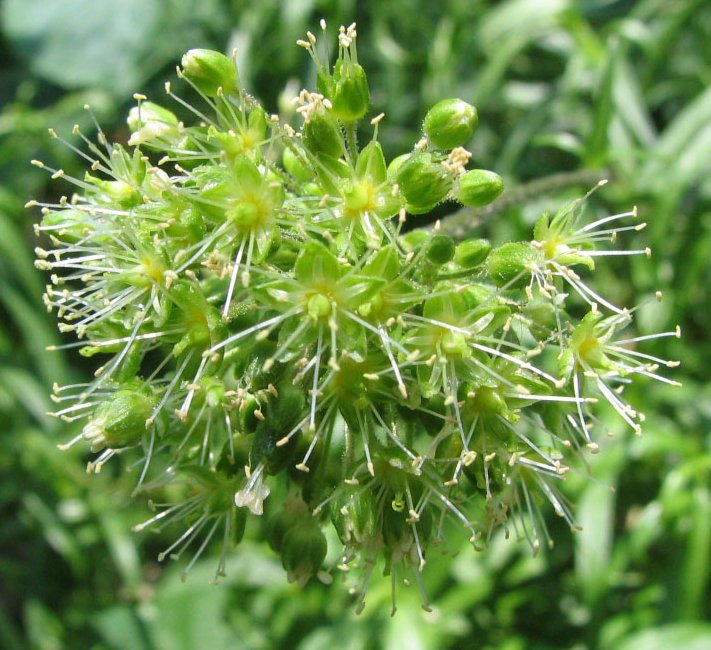
- Schiedea globosa

Scientific classification
- Kingdom: Plantae
- Clade: Tracheophytes
- Clade: Angiosperms
- Clade: Eudicots
- Order: Caryophyllales
- Family: Caryophyllaceae
- Genus: Schiedea; Cham. & Schltdl.

Type species
- Schiedea ligustrina Cham. & Schltdl.

Synonyms
- Alsinidendron H.Mann (1866); Eucladus Nutt. ex Hook. (1844)

= Schiedea =

Genus of flowering plants

Schiedea is a genus of flowering plants in the family Caryophyllaceae. It contains 35 species which are endemic to Hawaii.

The 35th species was spotted in 2016 by Tom DeMent while surveying a forest near Laupāhoehoe on Hawai‘i Island. It was named S. haakoaensis in 2022.

== Species ==
- Schiedea adamantis H.St.John – Diamond Head schiedea (Oʻahu, Hawaii)
- Schiedea amplexicaulis H.Mann
- Schiedea apokremnos H.St.John
- Schiedea attenuata W.L.Wagner, Weller & Sakai
- Schiedea diffusa A.Gray
- Schiedea globosa H.Mann
- Schiedea haakoaensis W.L.Wagner, Weller & A.K.Sakai
- Schiedea haleakalensis O.Deg. & Sherff
- Schiedea hawaiiensis Hillebr.
- Schiedea helleri Sherff
- Schiedea hookeri A.Gray
- Schiedea implexa (Hillebr.) Sherff
- Schiedea jacobii W.L.Wagner, Weller & A.C.Medeiros
- Schiedea kaalae Wawra – Maʻoliʻoli (Oʻahu, Hawaii)
- Schiedea kauaiensis H.St.John
- Schiedea kealiae Caum & Hosaka
- Schiedea laui W.L.Wagner & Weller
- Schiedea ligustrina Cham. & Schltdl.
- Schiedea lychnoides Hillebr.
- Schiedea lydgatei Hillebr.
- Schiedea mannii H.St.John
- Schiedea membranacea H.St.John
- Schiedea menziesii Hook.
- Schiedea nuttallii Hook.
- Schiedea obovata (Sherff) W.L.Wagner & Weller
- Schiedea pentandra W.L.Wagner & E.Harris
- Schiedea perlmanii W.L.Wagner & Weller
- Schiedea pubescens Hillebr.
- Schiedea salicaria Hillebr.
- Schiedea sarmentosa O.Deg. & Sherff
- Schiedea spergulina A.Gray
- Schiedea stellarioides H.Mann
- Schiedea trinervis (H.Mann) Pax & K.Hoffm.
- Schiedea verticillata F.Br. – Nīhoa carnation (Nīhoa, Northwestern Hawaiian Islands)
- Schiedea viscosa H.Mann

== Gallery ==
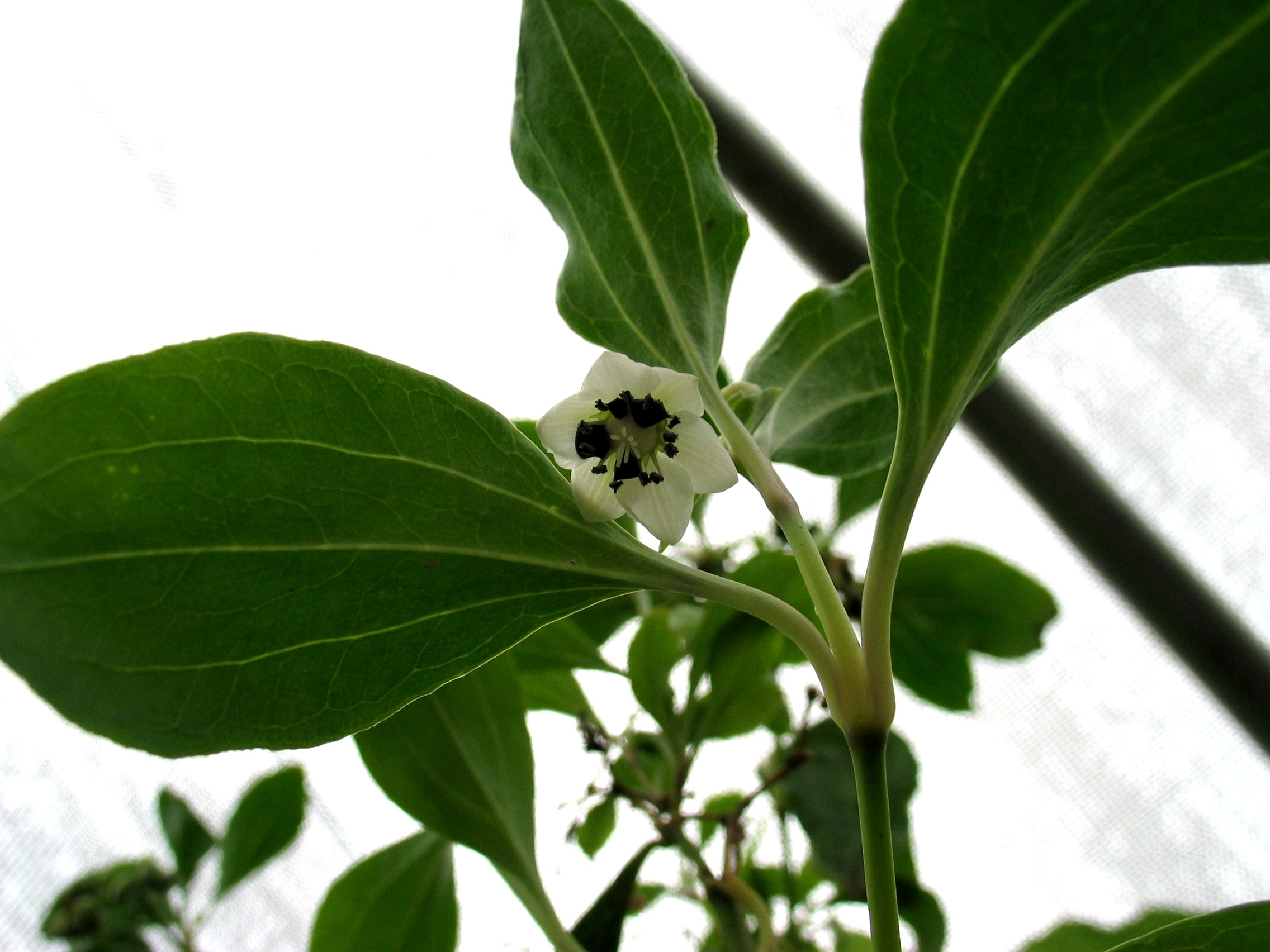
Schiedea obovata flowers

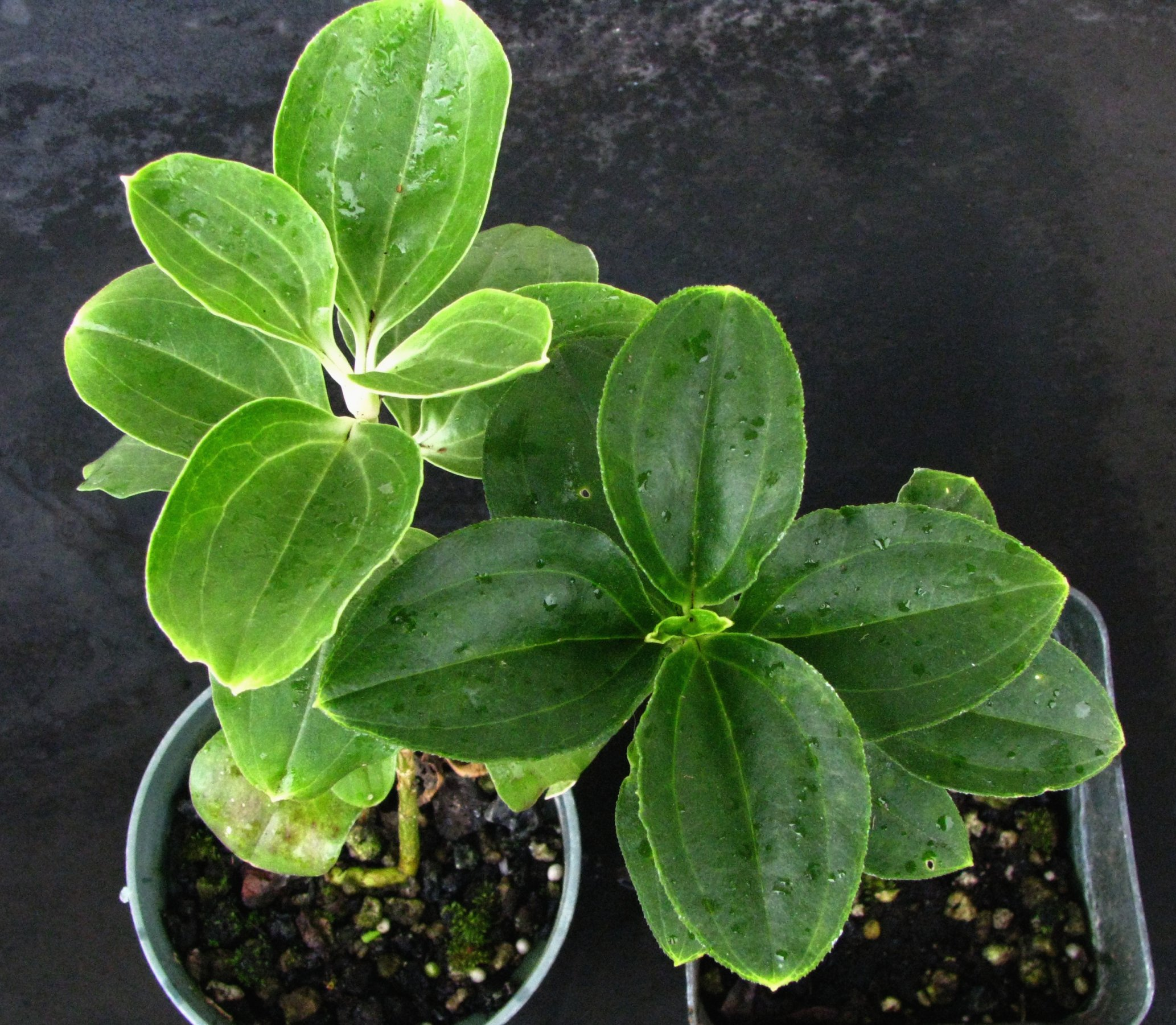
S. obovata (left), S. trinervis (right)
