= Schiedea kauaiensis =

Conservation status
- Critically Imperiled (NatureServe)

Scientific classification
- Kingdom: Plantae
- Clade: Tracheophytes
- Clade: Angiosperms
- Clade: Eudicots
- Order: Caryophyllales
- Family: Caryophyllaceae
- Genus: Schiedea
- Species: S. kauaiensis

Binomial name
- Schiedea kauaiensis H.St.John

Species of flowering plant

Schiedea kauaiensis is a rare species of flowering plant in the family Caryophyllaceae known by the common name Kauai schiedea. It is endemic to Hawaii, where it is known only from the island of Kauai. It is threatened by the degradation and destruction of its habitat. It was federally listed as an endangered species of the United States in 1996.

This plant is a subshrub with branches up to 1.5 meters long. The oppositely arranged leaves have green or purplish blades up to 13 centimeters long by 3.5 wide. The inflorescence is a hairy cluster of flowers with small green or purple-tinged sepals and no petals.

This plant is now limited to two populations on the island of Kauai, totalling only 12 individuals. Before these populations were located the plant had been feared extinct. Threats to the species include habitat degradation by feral pigs and introduced species of plants such as Ageratina riparia (Hamakua pamakani), Clidemia hirta (Koster's curse), Clusia rosea (autograph tree), Erigeron karvinskianus (daisy fleabane), Lantana camara (lantana), Psidium guajava (common guava), Heptapleurum actinophyllum (octopus tree), Schinus terebinthifolius (Christmasberry), Rubus rosifolius (thimbleberry), Passiflora mollissima (banana poka), Rubus argutus (prickly Florida blackberry), Drymaria cordata (Pipili), and Paspalum conjugatum (Hilo grass).
