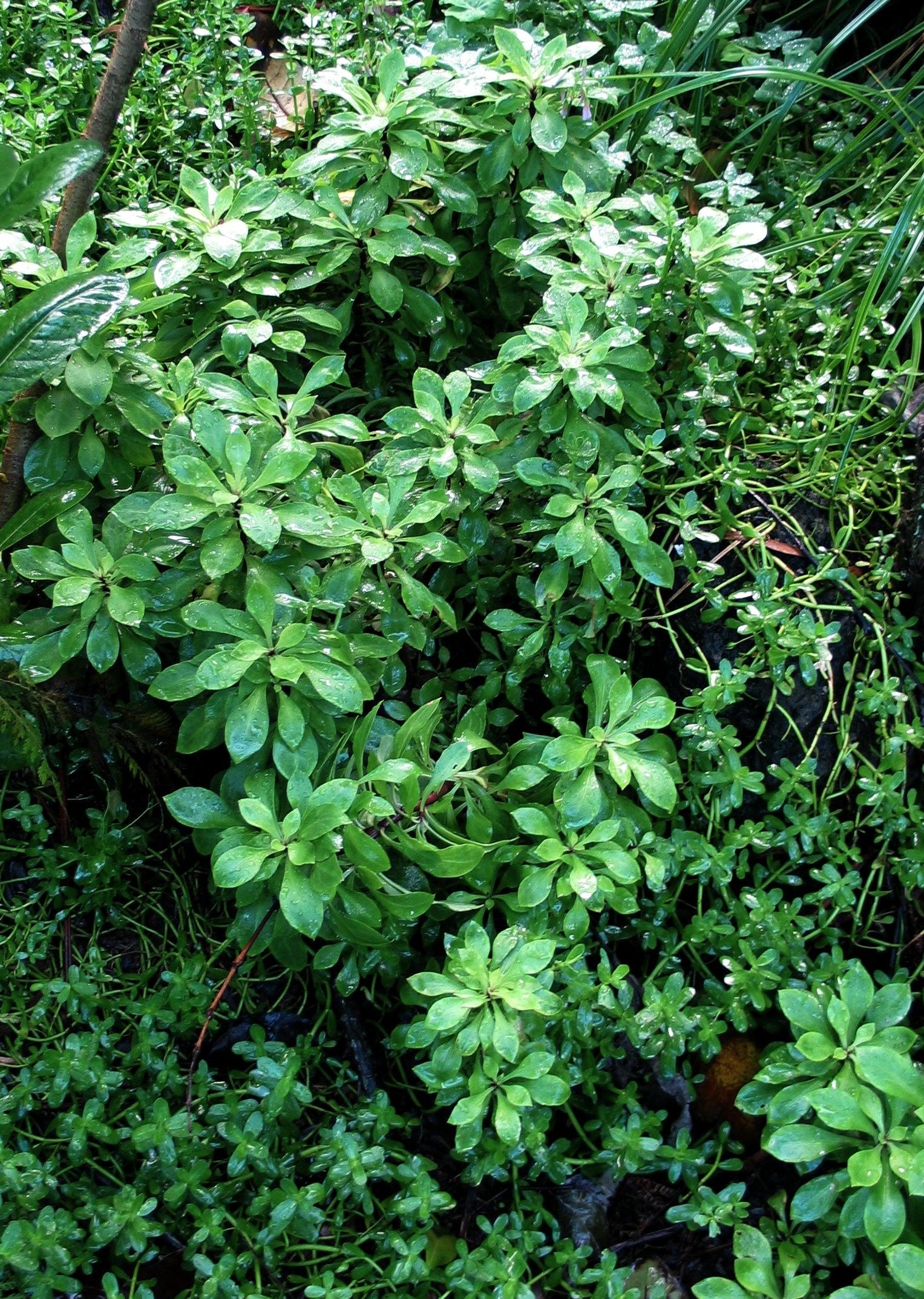

Conservation status
- Critically Endangered (IUCN 3.1)

Scientific classification
- Kingdom: Plantae
- Clade: Tracheophytes
- Clade: Angiosperms
- Clade: Eudicots
- Order: Caryophyllales
- Family: Caryophyllaceae
- Genus: Schiedea
- Species: S. kaalae

Binomial name
- Schiedea kaalae Wawra

= Schiedea kaalae =

Species of flowering plant

Schiedea kaalae, known as Oahu schiedea or Maʻoliʻoli in Hawaiian, is a species of flowering plant in the family Caryophyllaceae, that is endemic to the island of Oʻahu in Hawaii. It inhabits coastal mesic and mixed mesic forests at elevations of 210–790 m (690–2,590 ft) in the Koʻolau and Waiʻanae Ranges. It is threatened by habitat loss.
