= Schiedea lydgatei =

Conservation status
- Critically Imperiled (NatureServe)

Scientific classification
- Kingdom: Plantae
- Clade: Embryophytes
- Clade: Tracheophytes
- Clade: Angiosperms
- Clade: Eudicots
- Order: Caryophyllales
- Family: Caryophyllaceae
- Genus: Schiedea
- Species: S. lydgatei

Binomial name
- Schiedea lydgatei Hillebr.

Species of flowering plant

Schiedea lydgatei is a rare species of flowering plant in the family Caryophyllaceae known by the common name Kamalo Gulch schiedea and Pacific schiedea. It is endemic to Hawaii, where it is known only from the island of Molokai. It is threatened by the degradation and destruction of its habitat. It is a federally listed endangered species of the United States.

This plant is a subshrub growing up to a meter tall. It is the only hermaphroditic species among genus Schiedea; it is likely the plant's ancestors were gynodioecious, with some all-female flowers and the others bisexual. The flowers have green sepals and no petals. The flowers have a sweet fragrance during certain times of the day. Pyralid moths can commonly be found on the flowers. They are probably also pollinated by the wind.

This plant grows in moist forests and shrublands on Molokai. There are probably fewer than 10,000 individuals remaining. It is threatened by fire, feral ungulates, and introduced species of plants.
