= Schiedea apokremnos =

Conservation status
- Critically Imperiled (NatureServe)

Scientific classification
- Kingdom: Plantae
- Clade: Tracheophytes
- Clade: Angiosperms
- Clade: Eudicots
- Order: Caryophyllales
- Family: Caryophyllaceae
- Genus: Schiedea
- Species: S. apokremnos

Binomial name
- Schiedea apokremnos H.St.John

Species of flowering plant

Schiedea apokremnos is a rare species of flowering plant in the family Caryophyllaceae known by the common names Kauai schiedea, Na Pali Coast schiedea, and ma`oli`oli. It is endemic to Hawaii, where it is known only from the island of Kauai. It is threatened by the degradation of its habitat. It is a federally listed endangered species of the United States.

This plant is a shrub growing 20 to 50 centimeters tall. The oppositely arranged leaves have fleshy, hairless blades 3 to 5 centimeters long and up to 1.2 centimeters wide. The flowers are borne in clusters. Each has green or purplish bracts and sepals and no petals. The fruit is a capsule.

By 2003 there were five populations totalling about 201 individuals; only two of the populations contained more than five plants. Since 2003 some more small, scattered populations have been located but others are believed to have been extirpated. It grows in dry coastal habitat among other shrubs, often on basalt cliffs.

One major threat to the species is the feral goat population. The goats eat the plants and foster the invasion of non-native plants by degrading the terrain. It is also threatened by fire.
