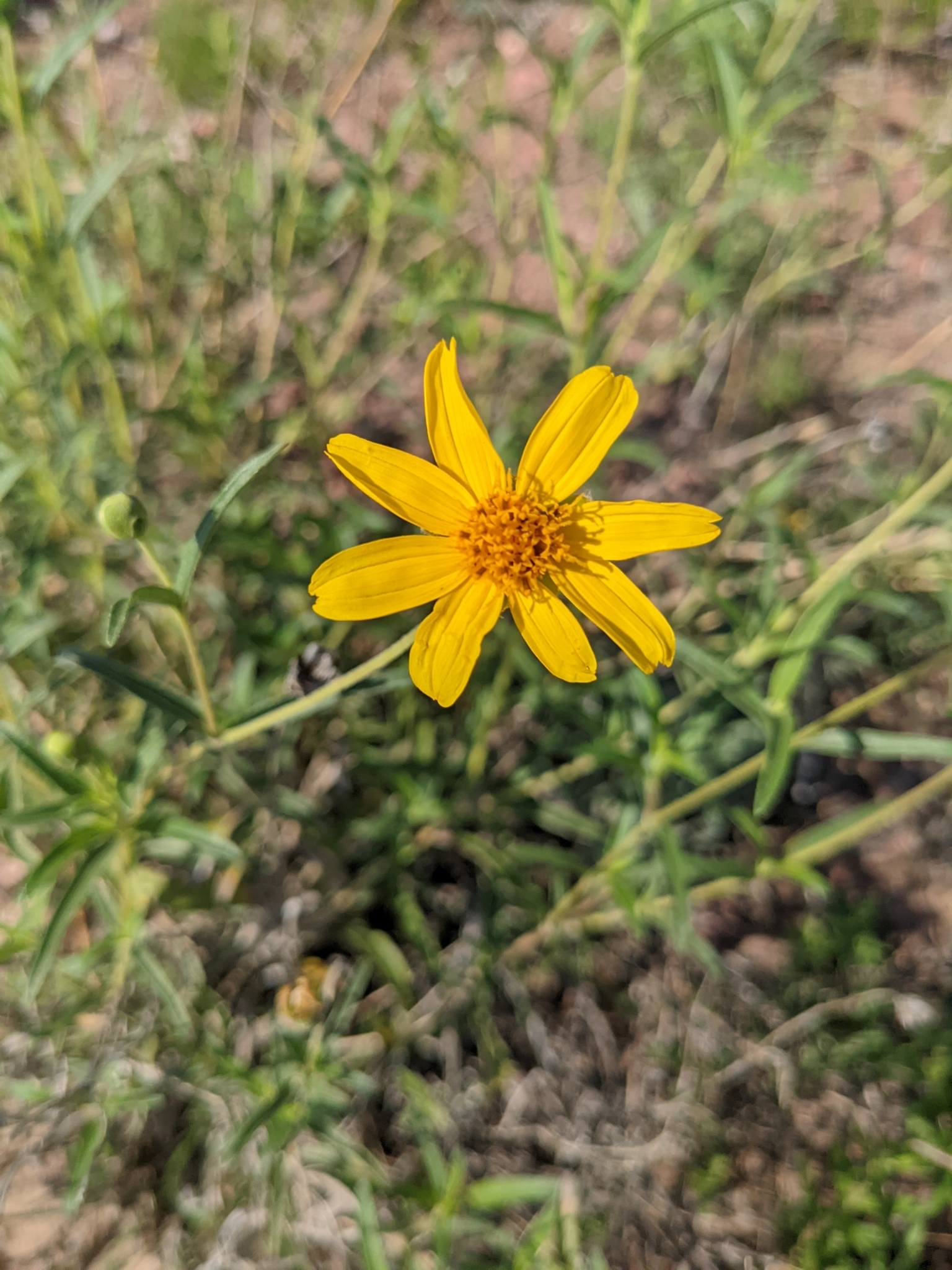
- Zexmenia buphtalmiflora

Scientific classification
- Kingdom: Plantae
- Clade: Tracheophytes
- Clade: Angiosperms
- Clade: Eudicots
- Clade: Asterids
- Order: Asterales
- Family: Asteraceae
- Subfamily: Asteroideae
- Tribe: Heliantheae
- Subtribe: Ecliptinae
- Genus: Zexmenia; La Llave

Type species
- Zexmenia serrata La Llave

= Zexmenia =

Genus of flowering plants

Zexmenia is a genus of Latin American plants in the tribe Heliantheae within the family Asteraceae.

Species

- Zexmenia brachylepis (Griseb.) Cabrera - Bolivia, Paraguay, northern Argentina
- Zexmenia buphtalmiflora (Lorentz) Ariza - Argentina
- Zexmenia foliosa Rusby ex W.W.Jones - Bolivia
- Zexmenia monocephala (DC.) Heynh. - Veracruz in Mexico
- Zexmenia phyllocephala (Hemsl.) Standl. & Steyerm. - Guatemala
- Zexmenia serrata La Llave - Veracruz in Mexico
- Zexmenia virgulta Klatt - Chiapas, Central America

Formerly included

numerous species now considered more suited to other genera: Angelphytum Calyptocarpus Dimerostemma Jefea Lasianthaea Lundellianthus Oblivia Otopappus Oyedaea Sanvitalia Tuxtla Verbesina Wamalchitamia Wedelia
