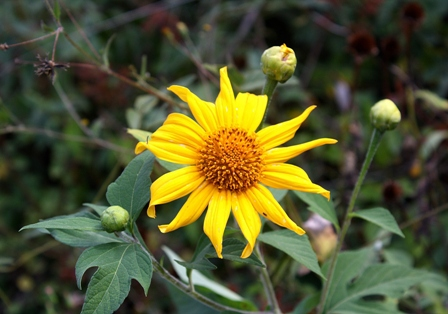
- Oyedaea verbesinoides

Scientific classification
- Kingdom: Plantae
- Clade: Embryophytes
- Clade: Tracheophytes
- Clade: Angiosperms
- Clade: Eudicots
- Clade: Asterids
- Order: Asterales
- Family: Asteraceae
- Subfamily: Asteroideae
- Tribe: Heliantheae
- Subtribe: Ecliptinae
- Genus: Oyedaea; DC.

Type species
- Oyedaea verbesinoides DC.

Synonyms
- Serpaea Gardner

= Oyedaea =

Genus of flowering plants

Oyedaea is a genus of South American flowering plants in the tribe Heliantheae within the family Asteraceae.

Species

- Oyedaea boliviana Britton – Bolivia
- Oyedaea bullata J. Koster – Bolivia
- Oyedaea buphthalmoides DC. – Peru
- Oyedaea camargoana (S.Díaz) S.Díaz – Colombia
- Oyedaea cuatrecasasii Pruski – Colombia
- Oyedaea huilensis Cuatrec. – Colombia
- Oyedaea lanceolata (Rusby) S.F.Blake – Bolivia
- Oyedaea maculata S.F.Blake – Venezuela
- Oyedaea neei Pruski – Bolivia
- Oyedaea obovata S.F.Blake – Colombia
- Oyedaea ovata (Gardner) Benth. – Goiás
- Oyedaea reticulata S.F.Blake – Colombia
- Oyedaea rusbyi S.F.Blake – Bolivia, Peru
- Oyedaea scaberrima (Benth.) S.F.Blake – Venezuela, Guyana
- Oyedaea tepuiana (V.M.Badillo) Pruski – Venezuela
- Oyedaea verbesinoides DC. – Panama, Colombia
- Oyedaea wedelioides (Klatt) S.F.Blake – Peru

formerly included

see Bahiopsis Dimerostemma Gochnatia Lundellianthus Otopappus Perymeniopsis Steiractinia Stomatanthes Viguiera Zyzyxia

- Oyedaea acuminata – Viguiera acuminata
- Oyedaea annua – Dimerostemma annuum
- Oyedaea helianthoides – Steiractinia helianthoides
- Oyedaea humboldtiana – Dimerostemma humboldtianum
- Oyedaea lippioides – Stomatanthes warmingii
- Oyedaea lundellii – Zyzyxia lundellii
- Oyedaea macrophylla – Bahiopsis microphylla
- Oyedaea mexicana – Otopappus mexicanus
- Oyedaea ovalifolia – Perymeniopsis ovalifolia
- Oyedaea seemannii – Viguiera seemannii
- Oyedaea steyermarkii – Lundellianthus steyermarkii
- Oyedaea vestita – Gochnatia densicephala
