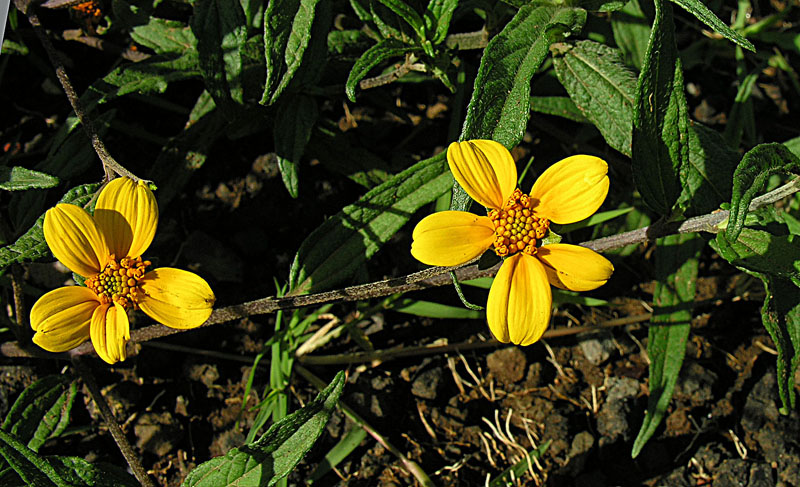
- Perymenium discolor

Scientific classification
- Kingdom: Plantae
- Clade: Tracheophytes
- Clade: Angiosperms
- Clade: Eudicots
- Clade: Asterids
- Order: Asterales
- Family: Asteraceae
- Subfamily: Asteroideae
- Tribe: Heliantheae
- Subtribe: Ecliptinae
- Genus: Perymenium; Schrad.

Type species
- Perymenium discolor Schrad.

= Perymenium =

Genus of flowering plants

Perymenium is a genus of South American and Mesoamerican plants in the tribe Heliantheae within the family Asteraceae.

== Species ==
65 species are accepted.

- Perymenium alticola McVaugh – Jalisco
- Perymenium arriagae Rzed. & Calderón – San Luis Potosí, Querétaro, and Hidalgo
- Perymenium asperifolium Sch.Bip. ex Klatt – Oaxaca and Puebla
- Perymenium ayutlanum B.L.Turner – Jalisco
- Perymenium basaseachicanum B.L.Turner – Chihuahua
- Perymenium beckeri B.L.Turner – Sinaloa
- Perymenium berlandieri DC. – México State, Morelos, Puebla, Guerrero, Hidalgo, Guanajuato, D.F., and Oaxaca
- Perymenium bishopii H.Rob. – Peru
- Perymenium buphthalmoides DC. – Chihuahua, Durango, Guanajuato, México State, Jalisco, and Michoacán
- Perymenium celendianum B.L.Turner – Peru
- Perymenium chloroleucum S.F.Blake – Guatemala, Chiapas, and Oaxaca
- Perymenium colombianum B.L.Turner – Colombia
- Perymenium consobrinum S.F.Blake – southwestern Mexico
- Perymenium cornutum Brandegee – San Luis Potosí
- Perymenium cualense B.L.Turner – Jalisco
- Perymenium discolor Schrad. – Oaxaca, Puebla
- Perymenium episcopale J.J.Fay – Guerrero
- Perymenium fayi B.L.Turner – Sinaloa
- Perymenium featherstonei S.F.Blake – Peru
- Perymenium garciaruizii Rzed. – Michoacán
- Perymenium ghiesbreghtii B.L.Rob. & Greenm. – Chiapas
- Perymenium glandulosum Brandegee – Puebla
- Perymenium globosum B.L.Rob. – Michoacán
- Perymenium gracile Hemsl. – Veracruz, Oaxaca, Guatemala, and Chiapas
- Perymenium grande Hemsl. – Guatemala, Costa Rica, Oaxaca, Honduras, Chiapas, and El Salvador
- Perymenium gymnolomoides (Less.) DC. – Veracruz, Belize, Campeche, Quintana Roo, Tabasco, Chiapas, Guatemala, and Oaxaca
- Perymenium gypsophilum (B.L.Turner) B.L.Turner – Nuevo León
- Perymenium harlingii H.Rob. – Ecuador
- Perymenium hintonii McVaugh – Michoacán
- Perymenium hintoniorum B.L.Turner – Nuevo León
- Perymenium hondurense Pruski – Honduras
- Perymenium huascaranum B.L.Turner – Peru
- Perymenium huentitanum B.L.Turner – Jalisco
- Perymenium ibarrarum Rzed. & Calderón – México State and Michoacán
- Perymenium jalapanum Standl. & Steyerm. – Guatemala
- Perymenium jaliscense B.L.Rob. & Greenm. – Jalisco
- Perymenium jelskii (Hieron.) S.F.Blake – Peru and Ecuador
- Perymenium klattianum J.J.Fay – Chiapas, Veracruz, and Oaxaca
- Perymenium macrocephalum Greenm. – Guerrero
- Perymenium matthewsii S.F.Blake – Peru
- Perymenium mendezii DC. – Guanajuato, Durango, Guerrero, Chihuahua, Oaxaca, Hidalgo, Tamaulipas, México State, Puebla, Jalisco, and San Luis Potosí
- Perymenium moctezumae Rzed. & Calderón – Querétaro and Hidalgo
- Perymenium nesomii B.L.Turner – Chihuahua
- Perymenium nicaraguense S.F.Blake – El Salvador, Guatemala, Nicaragua, and Honduras
- Perymenium oaxacanum B.L.Turner – Oaxaca
- Perymenium ovatum Brandegee – Puebla and Oaxaca
- Perymenium oxycarphum S.F.Blake – Sinaloa, Guerrero, and Michoacán
- Perymenium paneroi B.L.Turner – Michoacán
- Perymenium parvifolium A.Gray – northeastern Mexico
- Perymenium pinetorum Brandegee – Chiapas and Oaxaca
- Perymenium pringlei B.L.Rob. & Greenm. – Jalisco
- Perymenium reticulatum J.J.Fay – México State
- Perymenium rogmacvaughii Rzed. & Calderón – México State and Michoacán
- Perymenium rude B.L.Rob. & Greenm. – Chihuahua
- Perymenium sedasanum J.J.Fay – Oaxaca
- Perymenium sonoranum (B.L.Turner) B.L.Turner – Sonora and Chihuahua
- Perymenium sotoarenasii Rzed. & Calderón – Querétaro and San Luis Potosí
- Perymenium stenophyllum S.F.Blake – Chihuahua, Sinaloa, and Nayarit
- Perymenium subsquarrosum B.L.Rob. & Greenm. – Zacatecas
- Perymenium tamaulipense B.L.Turner – Tamaulipas and Nuevo León
- Perymenium tehuacanum Villaseñor & Panero – Puebla
- Perymenium uxoris McVaugh – Nayarit
- Perymenium vandevenderorum B.L.Turner – Sonora
- Perymenium wilburorum McVaugh – Jalisco
- Perymenium yanezii B.L.Turner – Tamaulipas

=== Formerly included ===
Several species were once considered members of Perymenium but are now placed in other genera, including Damnxanthodium, Oteiza, and Steiractinia. They include:

- Oteiza acuminata La Llave (as Perymenium acuminatum (La Llave) S.F.Blake)
