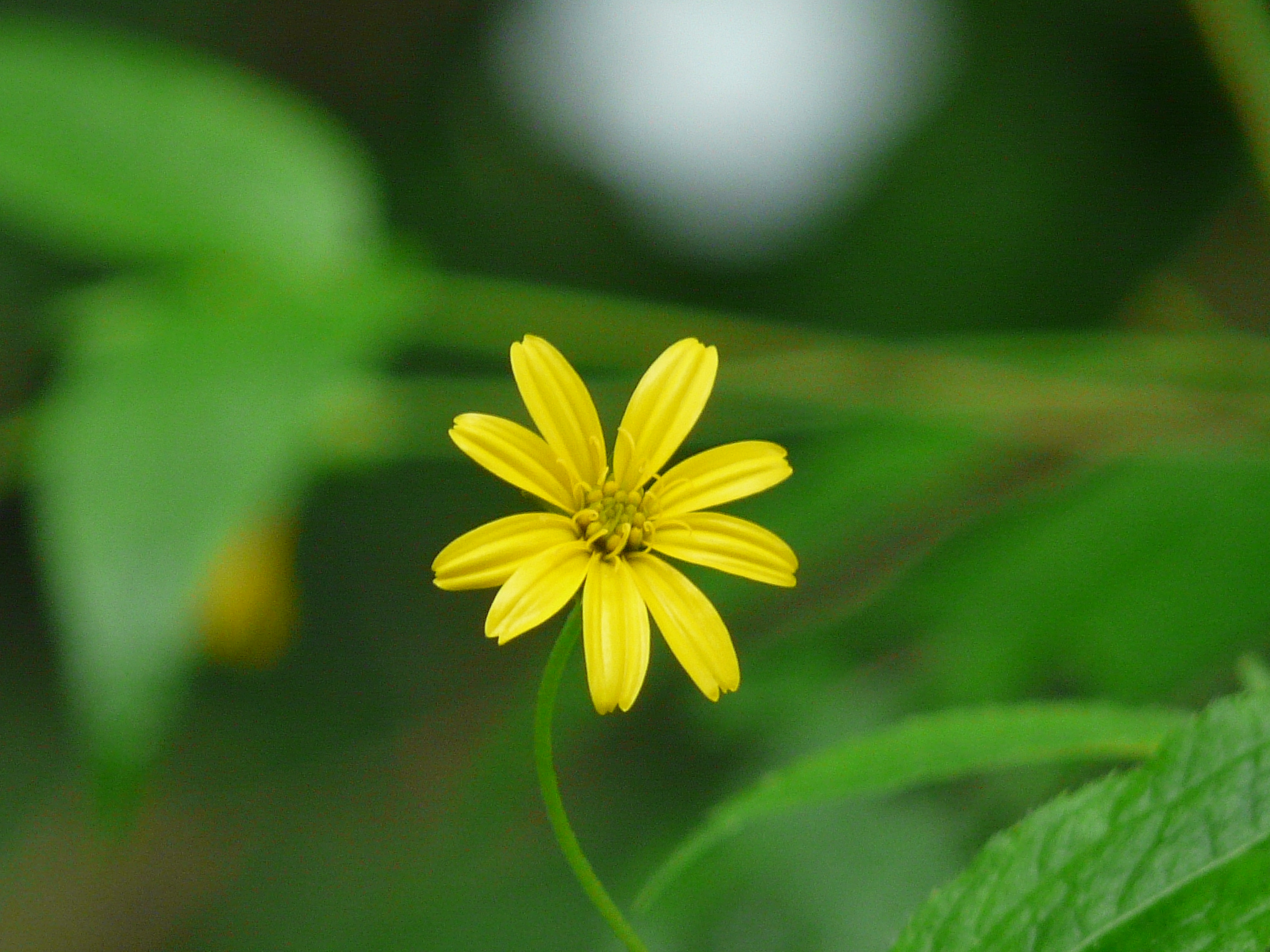
- Lipoblepharis urticifolia

Scientific classification
- Kingdom: Plantae
- Clade: Tracheophytes
- Clade: Angiosperms
- Clade: Eudicots
- Clade: Asterids
- Order: Asterales
- Family: Asteraceae
- Genus: Lipoblepharis; Orchard

Species
- See text.

= Lipoblepharis =

Genus of plants

Lipoblepharis is a genus consisting of five species of flowering plants in the family Asteraceae. It is native to Tropical Asia, Subtropical Asia and Vanuatu. Most of these species were once classified under the genus Wedelia and were only re-classified as Lipoblepharis in 2013 by A.E. Orchard. The species are perennial or annual, having yellow flowers and awns on their pappus.

== Description ==
Like other genera in the family Asteraceae, Lipoblepharis have yellow flowers. These flowers consist of staminate discs in the centre, surrounded by fertile, pistillate ray florets. Their pappus has up to 2 awns that resemble stiff bristles. Despite what its name suggests, Lipoblepharis awns, while fragile, do not detach easily. Species in Lipoblepharis also have hairy leaves which differ in shape, ranging from ovate to lanceolate and linear.

== Taxonomy ==
The genus Lipoblepharis was established by Anthony Orchard in 2013. The name Lipoblepharis was inspired by the genus name Lipotriche, which comes from the Greek words lipo (‘abandon’) and trichos (‘hair’). This referred to species in Lipotriche having tiny, caducous (easily detached) hairs on their pappus. Compared to Lipotriche, species in Lipoblepharis have awns on their pappus that are more robust and do not detach easily. Thus, the name Lipoblepharis was coined (blepharis is Greek for ‘eyelash’) since eyelashes are slightly thicker than hair.

As of December 2025, the Global Compositae Database placed the genus in the tribe Heliantheae, but treated it as "uncertain > unassessed".

=== Species ===
As of December 2025, Plants of the World Online accepted the following species:

- Lipoblepharis asperrima (Decne.) Orchard
- Lipoblepharis floribunda Orchard
- Lipoblepharis stenophylla (Merr.) Orchard
- Lipoblepharis thailandica (H.Koyama) Orchard
- Lipoblepharis urticifolia (Blume) Orchard

== Distribution ==
Lipoblepharis is native to a wide range of countries in Tropical and Subtropical Asia, including India, Thailand and Vietnam. It can even be found in parts of Australia and the island country of Vanuatu.
