= Lone fleabane =

Lone fleabane is a common name for several plants and may refer to:

- Erigeron cavernensis
- Erigeron uncialis, native to the western United States
