= Rensonia =

Scientific classification
- Kingdom: Plantae
- Clade: Tracheophytes
- Clade: Angiosperms
- Clade: Eudicots
- Clade: Asterids
- Order: Asterales
- Family: Asteraceae
- Subfamily: Asteroideae
- Tribe: Heliantheae
- Subtribe: Ecliptinae
- Genus: Rensonia; S.F.Blake
- Species: R. salvadorica

Binomial name
- Rensonia salvadorica S.F.Blake

Genus of plants

Rensonia is a genus of Mesoamerican plants in the tribe Heliantheae within the family Asteraceae.

The genus is named for Salvadoran botanist Carlos Renson.

Species

The only known species is Rensonia salvadorica, native to Mesoamerica (Costa Rica, El Salvador, Guatemala, Chiapas, Oaxaca, Veracruz)
