= Blakiella =

Scientific classification
- Kingdom: Plantae
- Clade: Embryophytes
- Clade: Tracheophytes
- Clade: Angiosperms
- Clade: Eudicots
- Clade: Asterids
- Order: Asterales
- Family: Asteraceae
- Subfamily: Asteroideae
- Tribe: Astereae
- Subtribe: Baccharidinae
- Genus: Blakiella; Cuatrec.
- Species: B. bartsiifolia

Binomial name
- Blakiella bartsiifolia (S.F.Blake) Cuatrec.

Synonyms
- Podocoma bartsiaefolia S.F.Blake

Genus of flowering plants

Blakiella is a monotypic genus of flowering plants in the family Asteraceae, containing the single species Blakiella bartsiifolia. It is native to northeastern South America, where it occurs in Colombia and Venezuela.

This species is a perennial herb, producing several unbranched stems up to 30 centimeters tall from a woody base. The leaves are coated in glandular trichomes that hold drops of sticky exudate, which is likely protective against solar radiation. Its flower heads contain yellow flowers. This plant occurs in high mountain páramo habitat, taking hold in small accumulations of organic matter in rocky cracks and crevices.
