= Erigeron maxonii =

Scientific classification
- Kingdom: Plantae
- Clade: Tracheophytes
- Clade: Angiosperms
- Clade: Eudicots
- Clade: Asterids
- Order: Asterales
- Family: Asteraceae
- Genus: Erigeron
- Species: E. maxonii

Binomial name
- Erigeron maxonii S.F.Blake

Synonyms
- Erigeron chiriquensis Standley

Species of flowering plant

Erigeron maxonii is a Central American species of flowering plant in the family Asteraceae. It has been found only in Panama and Costa Rica. It is named for the botanist William Ralph Maxon.

Erigeron maxonii is a perennial subshrub with a woody stem up to 50 cm (20 inches) tall, producing a woody taproot. Stems are sometimes erect (standing straight up), sometimes reclining on the ground or leaning on other vegetation. The plant produces flower heads on long, thin stalks. Each head contains 40-115 white, pink, or red ray florets surrounding numerous yellow disc florets.
