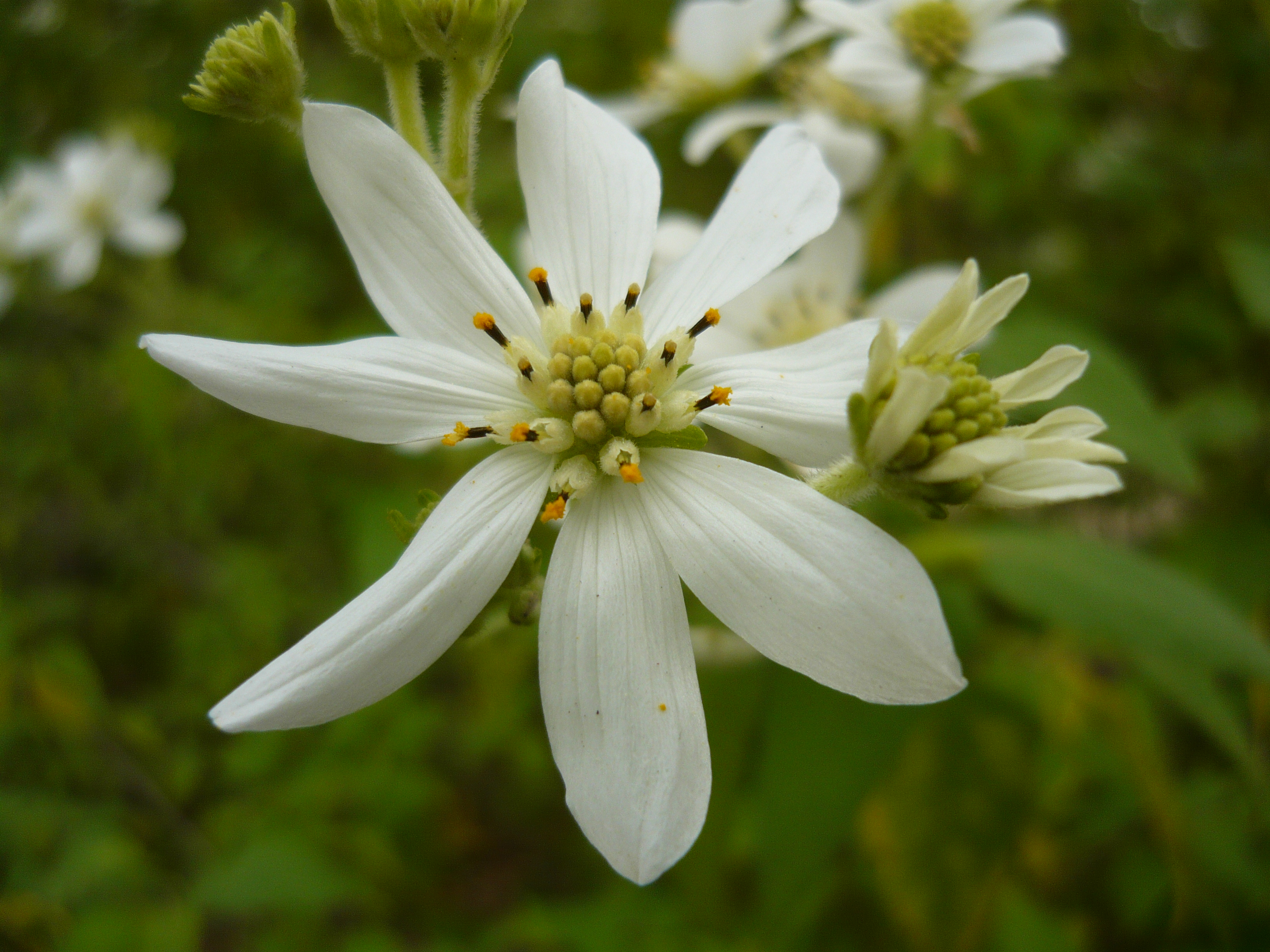
- Podachaenium paniculatum

Scientific classification
- Kingdom: Plantae
- Clade: Tracheophytes
- Clade: Angiosperms
- Clade: Eudicots
- Clade: Asterids
- Order: Asterales
- Family: Asteraceae
- Subfamily: Asteroideae
- Tribe: Heliantheae
- Subtribe: Verbesininae
- Genus: Podachaenium; Benth.

Type species
- Podachaenium paniculatum Benth.

Synonyms
- Aspiliopsis Greenm.; Altamirania Greenm.; Cosmophyllum K.Koch; Dicalymma Lem.

= Podachaenium =

Genus of plants

Podachaenium is a genus of Mesoamerican plants in the tribe Heliantheae within the family Asteraceae.

Species

- Podachaenium chiapanum B.L.Turner & Panero - Chiapas
- Podachaenium eminens (Lag.) Sch.Bip. ex Sch.Bip. - from Sinaloa to Costa Rica
- Podachaenium pachyphyllum (Sch.Bip. ex Klatt) R.K.Jansen, N.A.Harriman & Urbatsch - Puebla, Oaxaca
- Podachaenium paniculatum Benth. - Costa Rica

formerly included

see Squamopappus Verbesina

- Podachaenium skutchii (S.F.Blake) H.Rob. - Squamopappus skutchii (S.F.Blake) R.K.Jansen, N.A.Harriman & Urbatsch
- Podachaenium standleyi (Steyerm.) B.L.Turner & Panero - Verbesina standleyi (Steyerm.) D.L.Nash
