= Syncretocarpus =

Scientific classification
- Kingdom: Plantae
- Clade: Embryophytes
- Clade: Tracheophytes
- Clade: Angiosperms
- Clade: Eudicots
- Clade: Asterids
- Order: Asterales
- Family: Asteraceae
- Subfamily: Asteroideae
- Tribe: Heliantheae
- Subtribe: Helianthinae
- Genus: Syncretocarpus; S.F.Blake

Genus of flowering plants

Syncretocarpus is a genus of flowering plants in the family Asteraceae.

It consists of sub-shrubs that are endemic to the Andean Mountain region of Peru. They occur in dry, rocky canyons. It is a member of the subtribe Helianthinae, which includes the common sunflower (Helianthus).

The genus is characterized by the presence of corky margins on the cypselae (achenes), as well as the presence in two species of a conspicuous elaiasome. It appears to be the sister group to the Andean genus Pappobolus, which lacks either corky margins or an elaiasome on its cypselae.

Species

- Syncretocarpus anchashino Panero & A.Granda
- Syncretocarpus sericeus S.F.Blake
- Syncretocarpus similis S.F.Blake
