= Tuxtla =

Tuxtla may refer to:

Cities and towns

- Tuxtla Gutiérrez, capital of the Mexican state of Chiapas
- San Andrés Tuxtla, Veracruz
- Santiago Tuxtla, Veracruz
- Tuxtla Chico, Chiapas

Other

- Los Tuxtlas, region of Veracruz
- Sierra de los Tuxtlas, mountain range in Veracruz
- Tuxtla Statuette, early Olmec relic
- Tuxtla quail-dove, bird of the family Columbidae
- Tuxtla (plant), a genus of Mesoamerican plants in the sunflower family
