= Oblivia ceronii =

Conservation status
- Vulnerable (IUCN 3.1)

Scientific classification
- Kingdom: Plantae
- Clade: Tracheophytes
- Clade: Angiosperms
- Clade: Eudicots
- Clade: Asterids
- Order: Asterales
- Family: Asteraceae
- Tribe: Heliantheae
- Genus: Oblivia
- Species: O. ceronii

Binomial name
- Oblivia ceronii H.Rob.

Species of flowering plant

Oblivia ceronii is a species of flowering plant in the family Asteraceae. It is found only in Ecuador. Its natural habitat is subtropical or tropical moist lowland forests. It is threatened by habitat loss.
