= Oteiza acuminata =

Scientific classification
- Kingdom: Plantae
- Clade: Tracheophytes
- Clade: Angiosperms
- Clade: Eudicots
- Clade: Asterids
- Order: Asterales
- Family: Asteraceae
- Genus: Oteiza
- Species: O. acuminata

Binomial name
- Oteiza acuminata La Llave

Synonyms
- Calea elegans DC.; Perymenium acuminatum (La Llave) S.F.Blake

Species of flowering plant

Oteiza acuminata is a species of flowering plant in the tribe Heliantheae within the family Asteraceae. It is endemic to Mexico.
