= Dugesia mexicana =

- Dugesia mexicana

Scientific classification
- Kingdom: Plantae
- Clade: Tracheophytes
- Clade: Angiosperms
- Clade: Eudicots
- Clade: Asterids
- Order: Asterales
- Family: Asteraceae
- Subfamily: Asteroideae
- Tribe: Heliantheae
- Subtribe: Dugesiinae; Panero
- Genus: Dugesia; A.Gray
- Species: D. mexicana

Binomial name
- Dugesia mexicana (A.Gray) A.Gray

Synonyms
- Lindheimera mexicana A.Gray; Schizoptera lyrata Klatt

Genus of flowering plants

floral head from above

large bracts below floral head

dissected head showing cypselae with no pappuses

undersurface of deeply lobed blade

plant in habitat

Dugesia mexicana, with no English name, is the only species in the plant genus Dugesia, which should not be confused with the flatworm genus Dugesia. Native only to Mexico, Dugesia mexicana belongs to the vast Aster, Composite or Sunflower Family, the Asteraceae. It is endemic to south-central Mexico, where it grows along roadsides and in open, grassy areas. In traditional medicine, it is used to treat ailments such as diarrhea, tooth pain, and stomach ache.

== Description ==
An enormous number of yellow-flowered members of the huge Aster Family exist. However, as might be expected of the single species in a monotypic genus, Dugesia mexicana exhibits a unique combination of features. Here are the key ones:

- It is an herbaceous plant which can become perennial. Its stems, only up to 30 cm (12 in) long, lie close to the ground or ascend, and form dense,circular mats. Vegetative parts are variously hairy, sometimes densely so.
- Principle leaves concentrate at the base forming rosettes. They have petioles up to 8 cm (3 1/4 in) long and deeply pinnately or twice-pinnately lobed blades up to 12 cm (4 1/2 in) long and 5 cm (2 in) broad. Stem leaves are smaller than basal ones.
- Floral heads arise at stem tips or where leaves attach to their stem, on peduncles up to 8 cm (3 in) long. At the floral head's base there are 5 broad, leafy bracts up to 12 mm (1/2 in) long. Above these broad bracts there are smaller bracts about half the length and much narrower, and of the same number, 8-13, as the flat, petal-like "ray florets." The ray florets' yellow corollas, up to 12 mm (1/2 in) long, are deeply notched at their tips and display conspicuous brown to black nerves. The floral head's "eye" consists of 60-80 "disc florets" with cylindrical, yellow corollas. Ray flowers produce fruits, but disc florets are sterile.
- The browish, one-seeded, cypsela-type fruits commonly are broadest above their middles, flattened, their sides bearing remarkable "wings" divided into as many as 6 more or less semicircular segments diminishing in size toward the cypsela's base. Unlike most Aster Family species, cypselae in Dugesia mexicana develop no pappuses.

== Distribution ==
Dugesia mexicana is endemic just to the south-central Mexican states of Hidalgo, México, Michoacán, Puebla, Querétro, San Luis Potosí, Tlaxcala and Veracruz.

== Habitat ==
Dugesia mexicana often appears along roadsides and in open, grassy areas at elevations of 2,000–2,550 m (6,560–8,370 ft) above sea level.

== Ecology ==
In the Mexican state of Hidalgo, Dugesia mexicana is utilized by butterflies.

== Phenology ==
Dugesia mexicana flowers and fruits in September. Images on this page show an individual flowering in late August.

== As traditional medicine ==
In Mexico's Hidalgo state, Dugesia mexicana -- known locally as hierba del puerco, translatable to "pigweed"-- is used to treat diarrhea of babies when their teeth are emerging, also for tooth pain in general, for stomach ache and dolor de riñones, which in this area refers to low back pain.

== Taxonomy ==
In 1882 when Asa Gray formally described and named Dugesia mexicana, at the same time he erected the genus Dugesia, in which today it remains the sole species.

=== Phylogeny ===
A phylogenetic analysis using DNA sequencing data involving internal transcribed spacers and external transcribed spacers indicated that among the six genera of the subtribe Engelmanniinae of the tribe Heliantheae, and five genera closely related to the Engelmanniinae, the genus Dugesia appeared to be "... a paleoendemic relict isolated in the mountains of Mexico." Thus apparently Dugesia mexicana is a species that formerly was widespread but now is restricted to a smaller area, a mountainous refugium. Climate change is thought to be the driving force in evolving such species, generally involving habitat loss.

Moreover, the genus Dugesia was found to be sister to the similarly monotypic genus Rojasianthe of southern Mexico and Guatemala. These two genera were the most basal genera of the subtribe Engelmanniinae.

=== Etymology ===
The genus name Dugesia honors Alfredo Dugès, a zoologist in the Mexican state of Guanajuato, who supplied plant specimens from central Mexico to Asa Gray, who formally named and described the genus.

The species name mexicana refers to Mexico, its only native home.
