= Plagiolophus =

Plagiolophus is the scientific name of two genera of organisms and may refer to:

- Plagiolophus (plant), a genus of plants in the family Asteraceae
- Plagiolophus (mammal), a genus of odd-toed ungulates in the family Pachynolophidae
