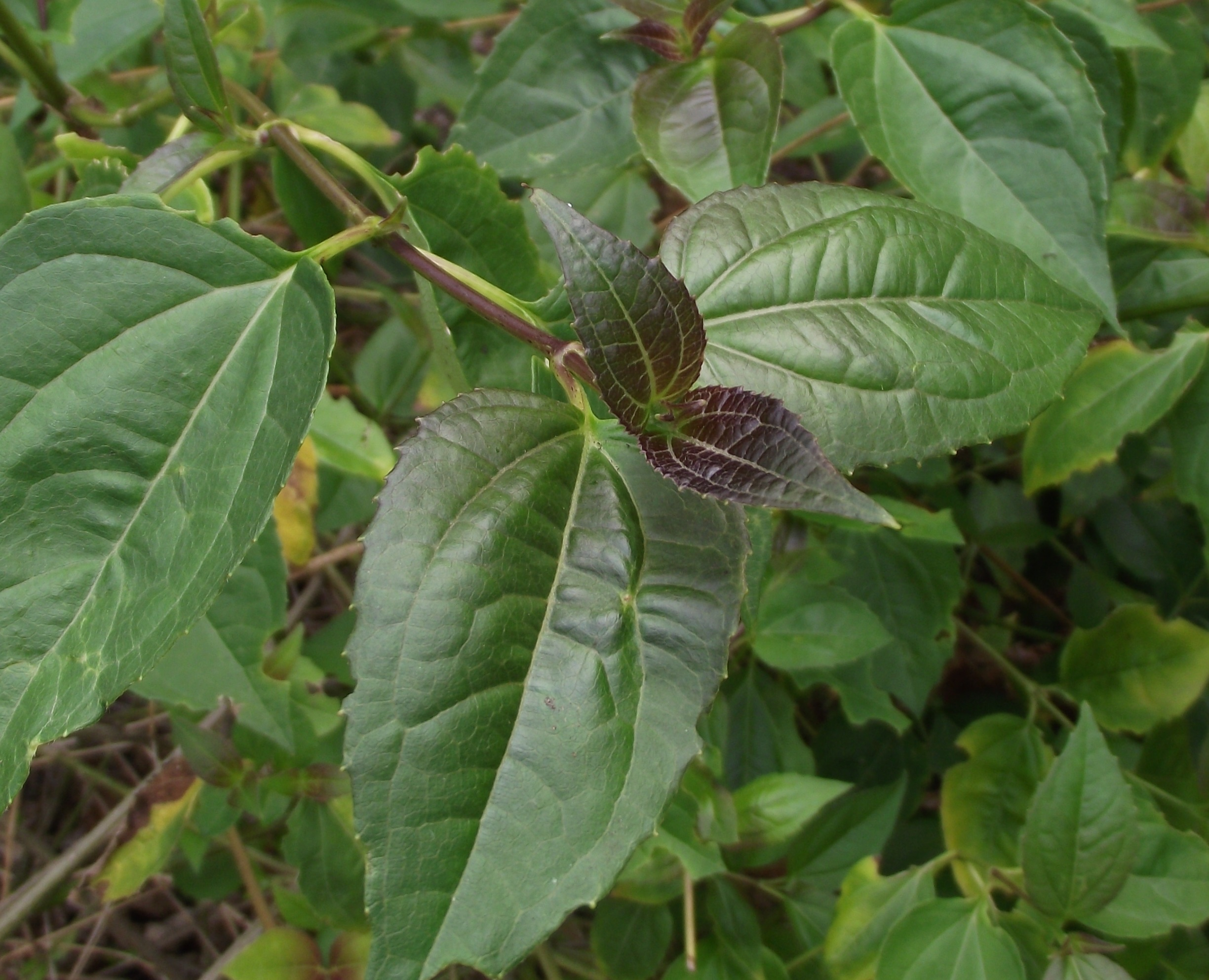
- Salmea oligocephala

Scientific classification
- Kingdom: Plantae
- Clade: Embryophytes
- Clade: Tracheophytes
- Clade: Angiosperms
- Clade: Eudicots
- Clade: Asterids
- Order: Asterales
- Family: Asteraceae
- Subfamily: Asteroideae
- Tribe: Heliantheae
- Subtribe: Spilanthinae
- Genus: Salmea; DC.

Type species
- Salmea scandens (L.) DC.

Synonyms
- Salmeopsis Benth.; Hopkirkia Spreng.; Fornicaria Raf.

= Salmea =

Genus of plants

Salmea is a genus of plants in the tribe Heliantheae within the family Asteraceae.

Species

- Salmea caleoides Griseb. - Cuba
- Salmea eupatoria DC. - Bolivia
- Salmea glaberrima C.Wright ex Griseb. - Cuba
- Salmea insipida (Jacq.) Bolick & R.K.Jansen - Cuba
- Salmea oligocephala Hemsl. - Oaxaca, Chiapas, México State, Michoacán
- Salmea orthocephala Standl. & Steyerm. - Guatemala, Honduras, Chiapas
- Salmea palmeri S.Watson - Guerrero, Jalisco, Michoacán
- Salmea petrobioides Griseb. - Bahamas
- Salmea scandens (L.) DC. - widespread in Mesoamerica, West Indies, + South America
- Salmea umbratilis B.L.Rob. - Cuba

formerly included

several species now placed in other genera: Oblivia Otopappus Trichospira
