= Trichocoryne =

Scientific classification
- Kingdom: Plantae
- Clade: Tracheophytes
- Clade: Angiosperms
- Clade: Eudicots
- Clade: Asterids
- Order: Asterales
- Family: Asteraceae
- Subfamily: Asteroideae
- Tribe: Heliantheae
- Subtribe: Zinniinae
- Genus: Trichocoryne; S.F.Blake
- Species: T. connata

Binomial name
- Trichocoryne connata S.F.Blake

Genus of flowering plants

Trichocoryne is a genus of flowering plants in the tribe Heliantheae within the family Asteraceae.

Species

The only known species is Trichocoryne connata, native to the State of Durango in Mexico.
