= Spilanthes =

Scientific classification
- Kingdom: Plantae
- Clade: Tracheophytes
- Clade: Angiosperms
- Clade: Eudicots
- Clade: Asterids
- Order: Asterales
- Family: Asteraceae
- Subfamily: Asteroideae
- Tribe: Heliantheae
- Subtribe: Spilanthinae
- Genus: Spilanthes; Jacq.

Type species
- Spilanthes urens Jacq.

Synonyms
- Spilanthus L., alternate spelling; Ceruchis Gaertn. ex Schreb.; Spilanthes sect. Salivaria DC.; Ceratocephalus Kuntze

Genus of asters

Spilanthes is a genus of African and South American plants in the tribe Heliantheae within the family Asteraceae.

== Species ==
The species within Spilanthes include:

- Spilanthes anactina F.Muell.
- Spilanthes callimorpha A.H.Moore
- Spilanthes commutata K.Koch
- Spilanthes costata Benth.
- Spilanthes intermedia (Rich.) DC.
- Spilanthes montana Britton & S.F.Blake
- Spilanthes ocymifolia (Lam.) A.H.Moore
- Spilanthes ovata Merr.
- Spilanthes paraguayensis R.K.Jansen
- Spilanthes pauciceps (Griseb.) S.F.Blake
- Spilanthes sartorii Sch.Bip. ex Klatt
- Spilanthes sessilis Poepp. & Endl.
- Spilanthes urens Jacq.

== Formerly included ==
Numerous species once included in Spilanthes are now considered members of other genera. The best known of these is the toothache plant, which was formerly Spilanthes acmella but is now considered part of its own genus and is referred to as Acmella oleracea. Other taxa formerly included in Spilanthes include:

- Adenostemma
- Eclipta
- Heliopsis
- Isocarpha
- Jaegeria
- Melampodium
- Salmea
- Verbesina
- Wollastonia
- Zinnia
