= Oxycarpha =

Scientific classification
- Kingdom: Plantae
- Clade: Tracheophytes
- Clade: Angiosperms
- Clade: Eudicots
- Clade: Asterids
- Order: Asterales
- Family: Asteraceae
- Subfamily: Asteroideae
- Tribe: Heliantheae
- Subtribe: Spilanthinae
- Genus: Oxycarpha; S.F.Blake
- Species: O. suaedifolia

Binomial name
- Oxycarpha suaedifolia S.F.Blake

Synonyms
- Oxycarpha suaedaefolia S.F.Blake, alternate spelling, see ICN

Genus of flowering plants

Oxycarpha is a genus of Colombian flowering plants in the tribe Heliantheae within the family Asteraceae.

Species

The only known species is Oxycarpha suaedifolia, native to the Guajira Peninsula of northeastern Colombia.
