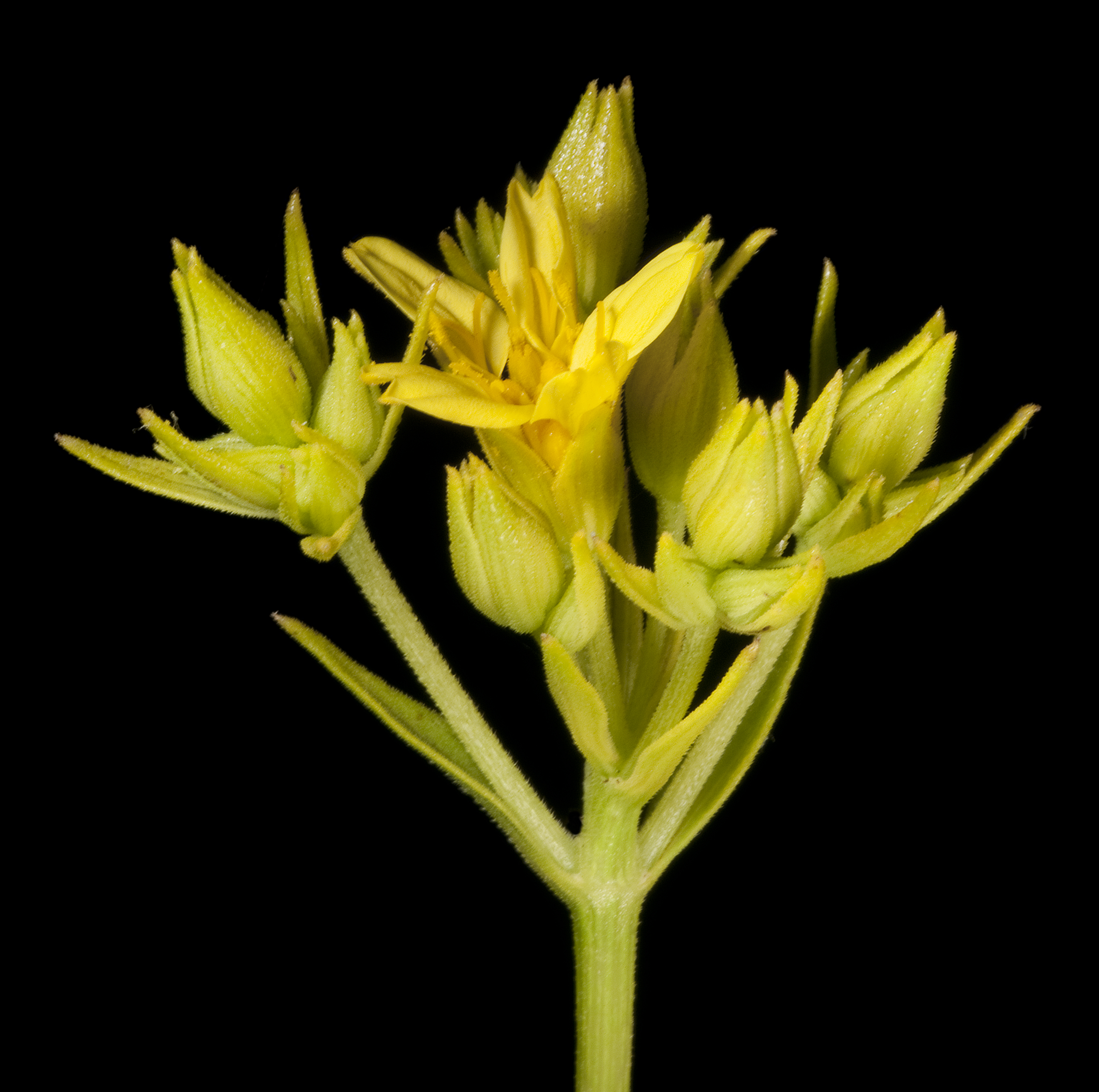

Scientific classification
- Kingdom: Plantae
- Clade: Tracheophytes
- Clade: Angiosperms
- Clade: Eudicots
- Clade: Asterids
- Order: Asterales
- Family: Asteraceae
- Genus: Pentalepis
- Species: P. trichodesmoides

Binomial name
- Pentalepis trichodesmoides F.Muell.

= Pentalepis trichodesmoides =

Species of plant

Pentalepis trichodesmoides is a species of flowering plant endemic to Australia, and found in the Northern Territory and Western Australia.

It was first described by Ferdinand von Mueller in 1863. The species epithet, trichodesmoides, refers to the likeness of this plant to Trichodesma zeylanicum at the beginning of flowering.
