= Chromolepis =

Scientific classification
- Kingdom: Plantae
- Clade: Tracheophytes
- Clade: Angiosperms
- Clade: Eudicots
- Clade: Asterids
- Order: Asterales
- Family: Asteraceae
- Subfamily: Asteroideae
- Tribe: Heliantheae
- Subtribe: Chromolepidinae; Panero
- Genus: Chromolepis; Benth.
- Species: C. heterophylla

Binomial name
- Chromolepis heterophylla Benth.

Genus of flowering plants

Chromolepis is a genus of flowering plants in the family Asteraceae.

There is only one known species, Chromolepis heterophylla, endemic to Mexico (States of México and Michoacán).
