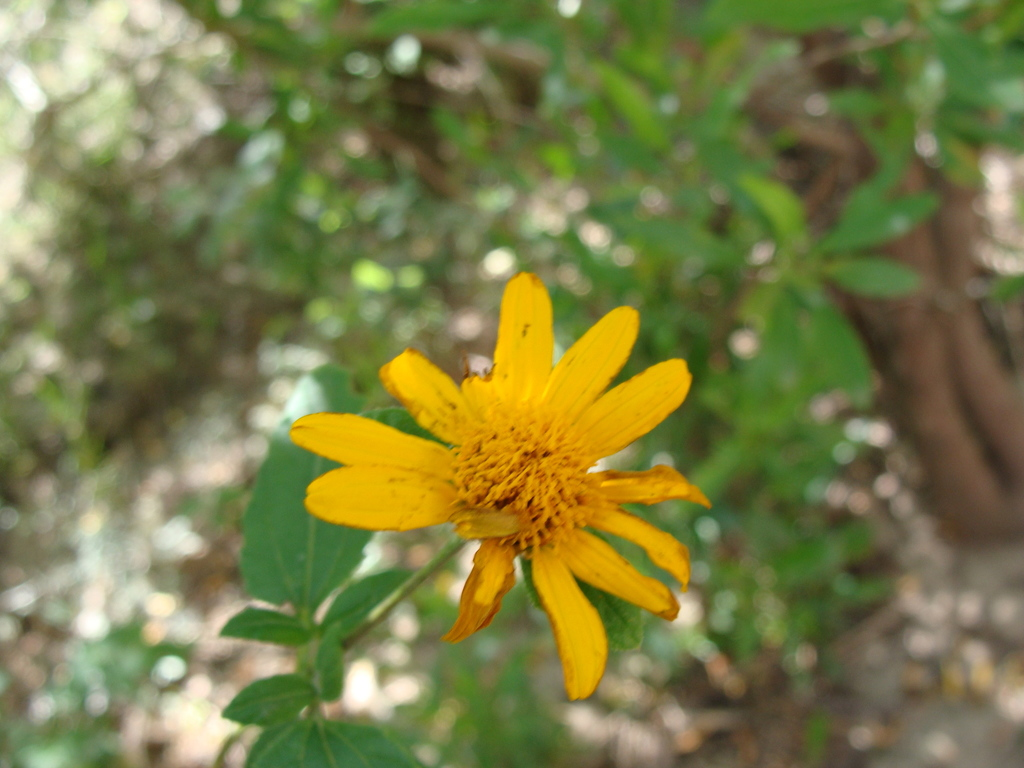

Scientific classification
- Kingdom: Plantae
- Clade: Tracheophytes
- Clade: Angiosperms
- Clade: Eudicots
- Clade: Asterids
- Order: Asterales
- Family: Asteraceae
- Subfamily: Asteroideae
- Tribe: Heliantheae
- Subtribe: Ecliptinae
- Genus: Jefea; Strother 1991

Type species
- Jefea lantanifolia 1991 (S.Schauer) Strother

= Jefea =

Genus of flowering plants

Jefea is a genus of North American flowering plants in the family Asteraceae, native to Mexico and the southwestern United States. These are shrubs up to 200 cm (80 inches) tall, with yellow or orange flower heads containing both ray and disc flowers.

Species

- Jefea brevifolia (A.Gray) Strother - Chihuahua, Coahuila, Nuevo León, Zacatecas, San Luis Potosí, Texas, New Mexico
- Jefea gnaphalioides (A.Gray) Strother - Tamaulipas, Nuevo León
- Jefea lantanifolia (S.Schauer) Strother - Tamaulipas, Nuevo León, Querétaro, San Luis Potosí, Hidalgo
- Jefea pringlei (Greenm.) Strother - Oaxaca, Puebla

formerly included

see Zexmenia

- Jefea phyllocephala (Hemsl.) Strother - Zexmenia phyllocephala (Hemsl.) Standl. & Steyerm. - Guatemala
