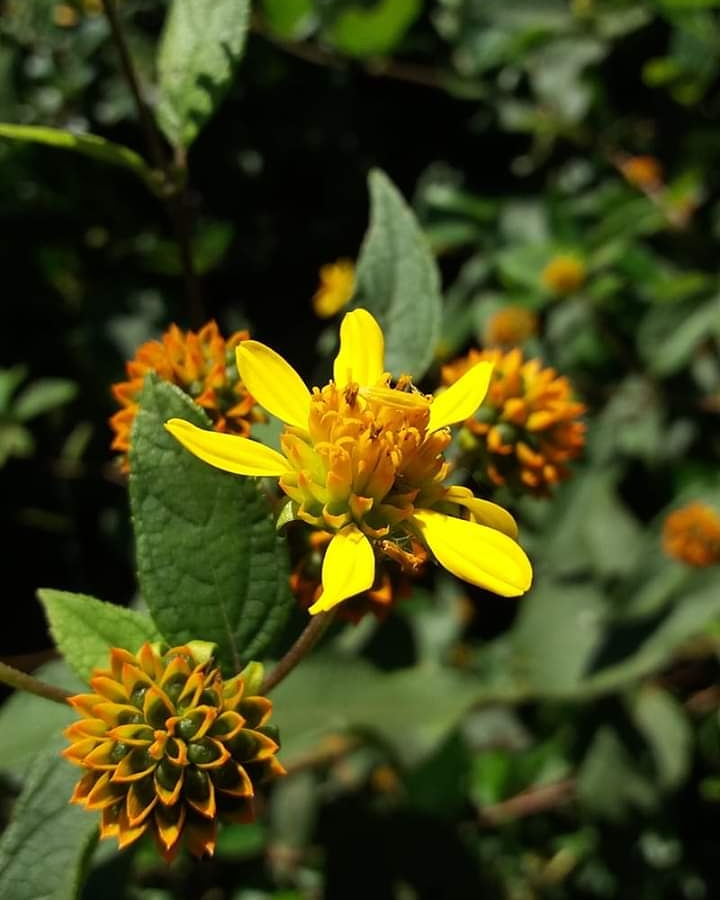
- Tilesia baccata

Scientific classification
- Kingdom: Plantae
- Clade: Tracheophytes
- Clade: Angiosperms
- Clade: Eudicots
- Clade: Asterids
- Order: Asterales
- Family: Asteraceae
- Subfamily: Asteroideae
- Tribe: Heliantheae
- Subtribe: Ecliptinae
- Genus: Tilesia; G.Mey.

Type species
- Tilesia capitata (syn of T. baccata) G.Mey.

Synonyms
- Crodisperma Poit. ex Cass.; Chatiakella Cass.; Chylodia Rich. ex Cass.; Wulffia Neck. ex Cass.

= Tilesia =

Genus of flowering plants

Tilesia is a genus of flowering plants in the family Asteraceae. Species in the genus Tilesia are found in Cuba and South America.

Species

- Tilesia baccata (L.) Pruski - South America from Venezuela to Paraguay
- Tilesia macrocephala (H.Rob.) Pruski - Colombia, Ecuador, western Venezuela
- Tilesia rubens (Alexander) Pruski - Guyana
