= Riencourtia =

Scientific classification
- Kingdom: Plantae
- Clade: Tracheophytes
- Clade: Angiosperms
- Clade: Eudicots
- Clade: Asterids
- Order: Asterales
- Family: Asteraceae
- Subfamily: Asteroideae
- Tribe: Heliantheae
- Subtribe: Ecliptinae
- Genus: Riencourtia; Cass.

Type species
- Riencourtia spiculifera Cass.

Synonyms
- Riencurtia Cass., alternate spelling; Tetrantha Poit. ex DC.; Pontesia Vell.

Genus of plants

Riencourtia is a genus of South American plants in the tribe Heliantheae within the family Asteraceae.

The generic name honors the birth name of Cassini's wife, Riencourt.

Species

- Riencourtia latifolia Gardner - Venezuela, Guyana, Brazil
- Riencourtia longifolia Baker - Brazil
- Riencourtia oblongifolia Gardner - Brazil, Bolivia, Suriname
- Riencourtia pedunculosa (Rich.) Pruski - Venezuela, Guyana, Fr Guiana, Suriname, Brazil
- Riencourtia spiculifera Cass.
- Riencourtia tenuifolia Gardner - Brazil
