= Iogeton =

Scientific classification
- Kingdom: Plantae
- Clade: Embryophytes
- Clade: Tracheophytes
- Clade: Angiosperms
- Clade: Eudicots
- Clade: Asterids
- Order: Asterales
- Family: Asteraceae
- Subfamily: Asteroideae
- Tribe: Heliantheae
- Subtribe: Ecliptinae
- Genus: Iogeton; Strother
- Species: I. nowickeanus

Binomial name
- Iogeton nowickeanus (D'Arcy) Strother

Synonyms
- Lasianthaea nowickeana D'Arcy

Genus of flowering plants

Iogeton is a monotypic genus of flowering plants in the family Asteraceae.

It only contains one known species, Iogeton nowickeanus, known only from San Blas Province in Panama.

The genus name of Iogeton is in reference to the Greek mythology character of Io (a goddess associated with rivers) and -geton (the Greek word meaning neighbour) and which is because the plant is found near streams.
