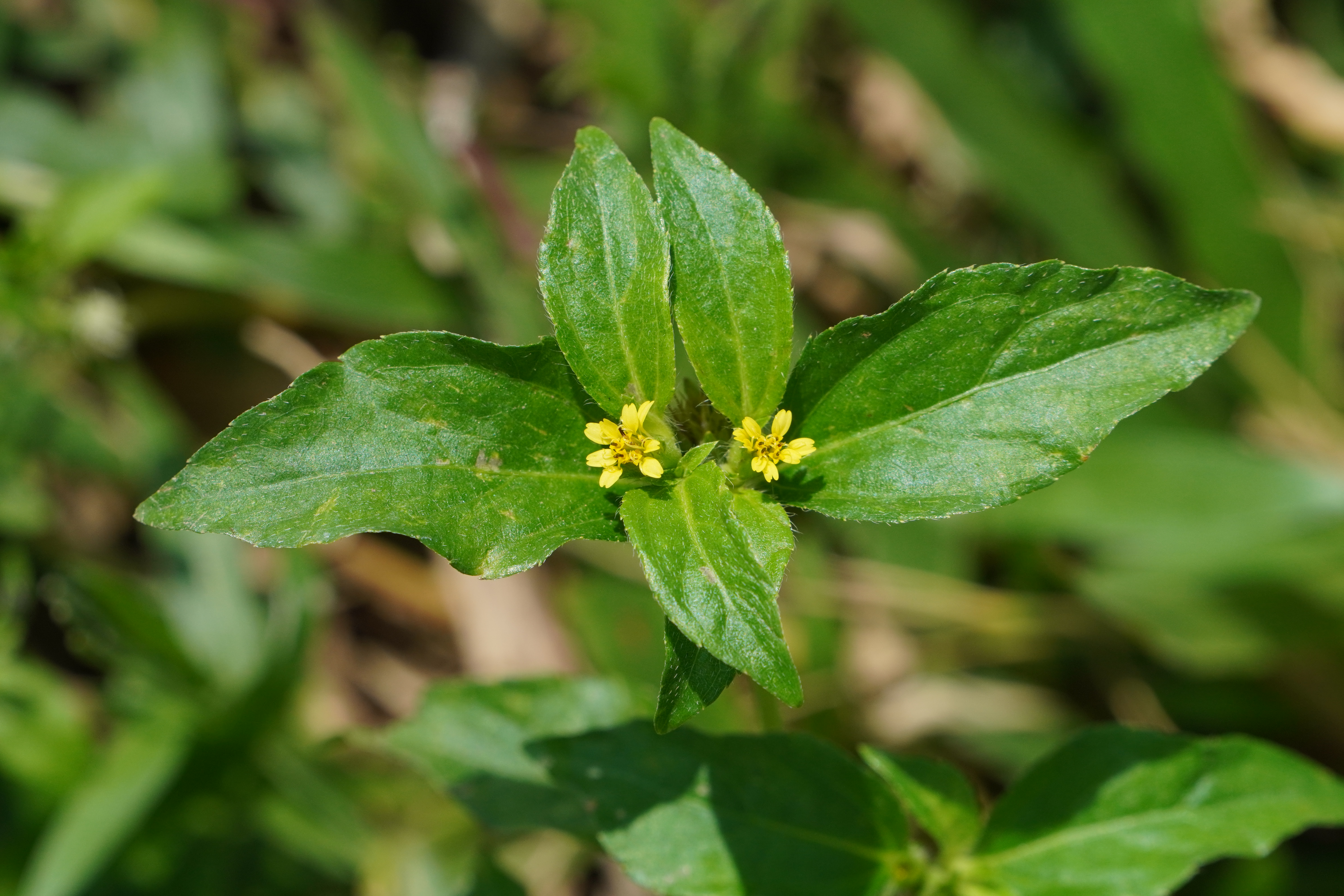
- Eleutheranthera ruderalis

Scientific classification
- Kingdom: Plantae
- Clade: Embryophytes
- Clade: Tracheophytes
- Clade: Angiosperms
- Clade: Eudicots
- Clade: Asterids
- Order: Asterales
- Family: Asteraceae
- Subfamily: Asteroideae
- Tribe: Heliantheae
- Subtribe: Ecliptinae
- Genus: Eleutheranthera; Poit.

Type species
- Eleutheranthera ovata Poit.

Synonyms
- Eleutheranthera Poit. ex Bosc. 1803; Eleuthrantheron Steud.; Fingalia Schrank; Kegelia Sch.Bip.; Ogiera Cass.

= Eleutheranthera =

Genus of flowering plants

Eleutheranthera is a genus of flowering plants in the family Asteraceae.

Species

- Eleutheranthera ruderalis (Sw.) Sch.Bip. - native to Central America, the West Indies, and northern South America; naturalized in Asia, Australia, southern South America, and various oceanic islands
- Eleutheranthera tenella (Kunth) H.Rob. - Colombia
