= Lantanopsis =

Scientific classification
- Kingdom: Plantae
- Clade: Embryophytes
- Clade: Tracheophytes
- Clade: Angiosperms
- Clade: Eudicots
- Clade: Asterids
- Order: Asterales
- Family: Asteraceae
- Subfamily: Asteroideae
- Tribe: Heliantheae
- Subtribe: Ecliptinae
- Genus: Lantanopsis; C.Wright ex Griseb.

Type species
- Lantanopsis hispidula C.Wright ex Griseb.

Genus of flowering plants

Lantanopsis is a genus of Caribbean flowering plants in the family Asteraceae.

Species

- Lantanopsis hispidula C.Wright ex Griseb. - Cuba
- Lantanopsis hoffmannii Urb. - Hispaniola
- Lantanopsis tomentosa Borhidi & Moncada - Cuba
