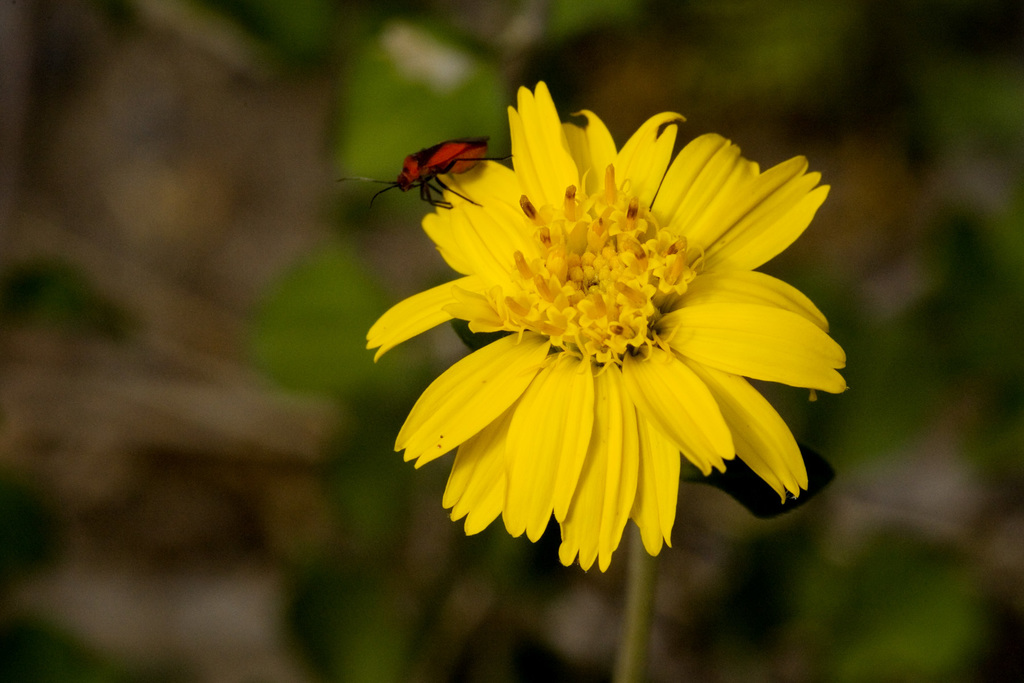

Scientific classification
- Kingdom: Plantae
- Clade: Tracheophytes
- Clade: Angiosperms
- Clade: Eudicots
- Clade: Asterids
- Order: Asterales
- Family: Asteraceae
- Genus: Jefea
- Species: J. brevifolia

Binomial name
- Jefea brevifolia (A.Gray) Strother 1991

Synonyms
- Zexmenia brevifolia A.Gray 1852

= Jefea brevifolia =

Species of flowering plant

Jefea brevifolia, the shortleaf jefea, is a North American species of flowering plants in the family Asteraceae. It is native to northern Mexico, and the southwestern and south-central United States, in Chihuahua, Coahuila, Durango, Nuevo León, Zacatecas, San Luis Potosí, Texas, and New Mexico

Jefea brevifolia is a small branching shrub, woody at the base but producing long flower stalks. Each stalk has one flower head at the top, each head containing 3-20 ray flowers and 30-100 disc flowers.
