= Tuberculocarpus =

Scientific classification
- Kingdom: Plantae
- Clade: Embryophytes
- Clade: Tracheophytes
- Clade: Angiosperms
- Clade: Eudicots
- Clade: Asterids
- Order: Asterales
- Family: Asteraceae
- Subfamily: Asteroideae
- Tribe: Heliantheae
- Subtribe: Ecliptinae
- Genus: Tuberculocarpus; Pruski
- Species: T. ruber

Binomial name
- Tuberculocarpus ruber (Aristeg.) Pruski

Synonyms
- Aspilia rubra Aristeg.; Wedelia rubra (Aristeg.) B.L.Turner

Genus of flowering plants

Tuberculocarpus is a genus of plants in the family Asteraceae.

There is only one known species, Tuberculocarpus ruber, endemic to the State of Amazonas in southern Venezuela.
