= Tehuana calzadae =

Scientific classification
- Kingdom: Plantae
- Clade: Tracheophytes
- Clade: Angiosperms
- Clade: Eudicots
- Clade: Asterids
- Order: Asterales
- Family: Asteraceae
- Tribe: Heliantheae
- Subtribe: Zinniinae
- Genus: Tehuana; Panero & Villaseñor
- Species: T. calzadae

Binomial name
- Tehuana calzadae Panero & Villaseñor

Species of flowering plant

Tehuana calzadae is a species of flowering plant in the family Asteraceae. It is an annual native to the southern Mexican states of Chiapas and Oaxaca. It is the sole species in genus Tehuana.
