= Alvordia =

Scientific classification
- Kingdom: Plantae
- Clade: Embryophytes
- Clade: Tracheophytes
- Clade: Angiosperms
- Clade: Eudicots
- Clade: Asterids
- Order: Asterales
- Family: Asteraceae
- Subfamily: Asteroideae
- Tribe: Heliantheae
- Subtribe: Helianthinae
- Genus: Alvordia; T.S.Brandegee

Type species
- Alvordia glomerata T.S.Brandegee

Synonyms
- Agiabampoa Rose ex O.Hoffm.

Genus of flowering plants

Alvordia is a genus of flowering plants in the family Asteraceae. It includes 4 species of shrubs which occur in the states of Baja California and Sonora, Mexico. The genus is characterized by having a secondary clustering of heads into compound units, so that what appears to be a single head is actually a group of heads packed together. The genus is classified as a member of subtribe Helianthinae, the same subtribe that contains the common sunflower (Helianthus). Based on the reported chromosome counts, Alvordia includes both diploid and polyploid species, but the relationships among these have not yet been studied in detail. No chromosome count has yet been reported for the species A. congesta from Sonora, which was a later transfer to the genus.

The genus is endemic to northwestern Mexico, known from the 3 states of Sonora, Baja California, and Baja California Sur.

Species

- Alvordia brandegeei A. M. Carter - Baja California Sur
- Alvordia congesta (Rose ex Hoffm.) B. L. Turner - Sonora
- Alvordia fruticosa Brandegee - Baja California, Baja California Sur
- Alvordia glomerata Brandegee - Baja California Sur
