= Synedrellopsis =

Scientific classification
- Kingdom: Plantae
- Clade: Tracheophytes
- Clade: Angiosperms
- Clade: Eudicots
- Clade: Asterids
- Order: Asterales
- Family: Asteraceae
- Subfamily: Asteroideae
- Tribe: Heliantheae
- Subtribe: Ecliptinae
- Genus: Synedrellopsis; Hieron. & Kuntze
- Species: S. grisebachii

Binomial name
- Synedrellopsis grisebachii Hieron. & Kuntze

Synonyms
- Synedrellopsis grisebachii var. inversa Hassl.

Genus of plants

Synedrellopsis is a genus of South American plants in the tribe Heliantheae within the family Asteraceae.

Species

The only known species is Synedrellopsis grisebachii, native to Bolivia, Paraguay, and Argentina.
