= Idiopappus =

Conservation status
- Endangered (IUCN 3.1)

Scientific classification
- Kingdom: Plantae
- Clade: Tracheophytes
- Clade: Angiosperms
- Clade: Eudicots
- Clade: Asterids
- Order: Asterales
- Family: Asteraceae
- Subfamily: Asteroideae
- Tribe: Heliantheae
- Genus: Idiopappus; H.Rob. & Panero
- Species: I. saloyensis

Binomial name
- Idiopappus saloyensis (Domke) H.Rob. & Panero

Synonyms
- Verbesina saloyensis Domke; Idiopappus quitensis H.Rob. & Panero

Species of flowering plant

Idiopappus is a monotypic genus of flowering plant in the family Asteraceae. Its only species is Idiopappus saloyensis, endemic to Ecuador. Its natural habitat is subtropical or tropical high-elevation grassland. It is threatened by habitat loss.
