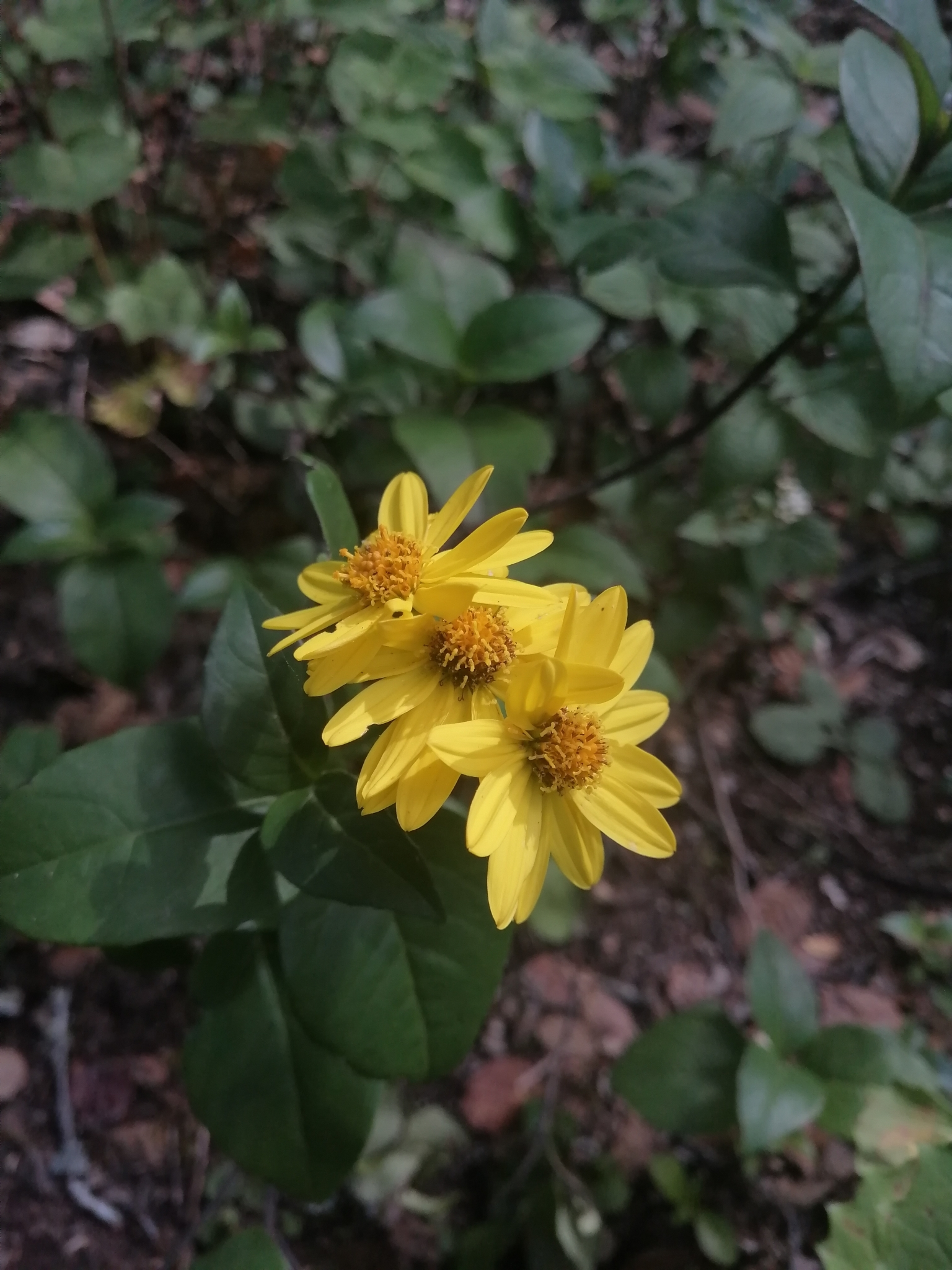
- Tetrachyron websteri in Mexico

Scientific classification
- Kingdom: Plantae
- Clade: Tracheophytes
- Clade: Angiosperms
- Clade: Eudicots
- Clade: Asterids
- Order: Asterales
- Family: Asteraceae
- Subfamily: Asteroideae
- Tribe: Heliantheae
- Subtribe: Verbesininae
- Genus: Tetrachyron; Schltdl.

Type species
- Tetrachyron manicatum Schltdl.

Synonyms
- Tephrocalea A.Gray; Calea sect. Tetrachyron (Schltdl.) Benth. & Hook.f.; Calea subg. Tephrocalea (A.Gray) B.L.Rob. & Greenm.

= Tetrachyron =

Genus of plants

Tetrachyron is a genus of Mesoamerican plants in the tribe Heliantheae within the family Asteraceae.

Species

- Tetrachyron brandegeei (Greenm.) Wussow & Urbatsch - Oaxaca, Puebla
- Tetrachyron discolor (A.Gray) Wussow & Urbatsch - Hidalgo
- Tetrachyron grayi (Klatt) Wussow & Urbatsch - Tamaulipas, Nuevo León
- Tetrachyron manicatum Schltdl. - Oaxaca, Veracruz
- Tetrachyron orizabaensis (Klatt) Wussow & Urbatsch - Guatemala, Chiapas, Oaxaca, Puebla, Veracruz
- Tetrachyron torresii B.L.Turner - Oaxaca
- Tetrachyron websteri (Wussow & Urbatsch) B.L.Turner - Tamaulipas, Hidalgo, Querétaro

formerly included

see Calea

- Tetrachyron oaxacana - Calea oaxacana
