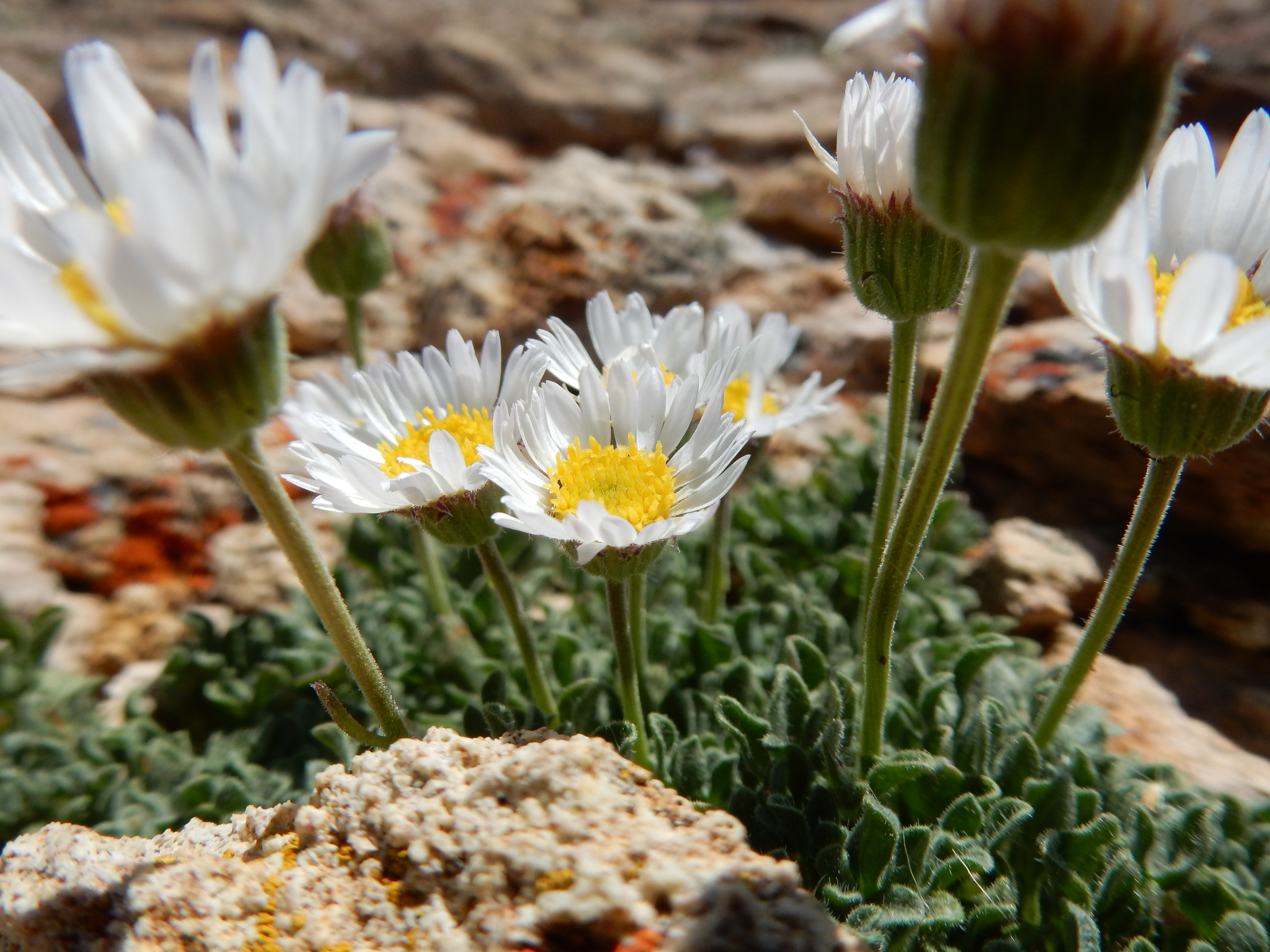
- In Nevada

Scientific classification
- Kingdom: Plantae
- Clade: Tracheophytes
- Clade: Angiosperms
- Clade: Eudicots
- Clade: Asterids
- Order: Asterales
- Family: Asteraceae
- Genus: Erigeron
- Species: E. uncialis

Binomial name
- Erigeron uncialis S.F.Blake

= Erigeron uncialis =

Species of flowering plant

Erigeron uncialis is a North American species of flowering plant in the family Asteraceae known by the common name lone fleabane or limestone daisy. It is native to the western United States, in the states of Nevada and California.

Erigeron uncialis grows on cliff faces, usually limestone, often alongside various conifer trees. It is a clump-forming perennial herb rarely more than 7 centimeters (2.8 inches) tall, producing a taproot and a woody underground caudex. The inflorescence is made up of only one flower heads per stem. Each head contains 22–30 white or pink ray florets surrounding numerous yellow disc florets.

Varieties

- Erigeron uncialis var. conjugans S.F.Blake - Nevada
- Erigeron uncialis var. uncialis - California
