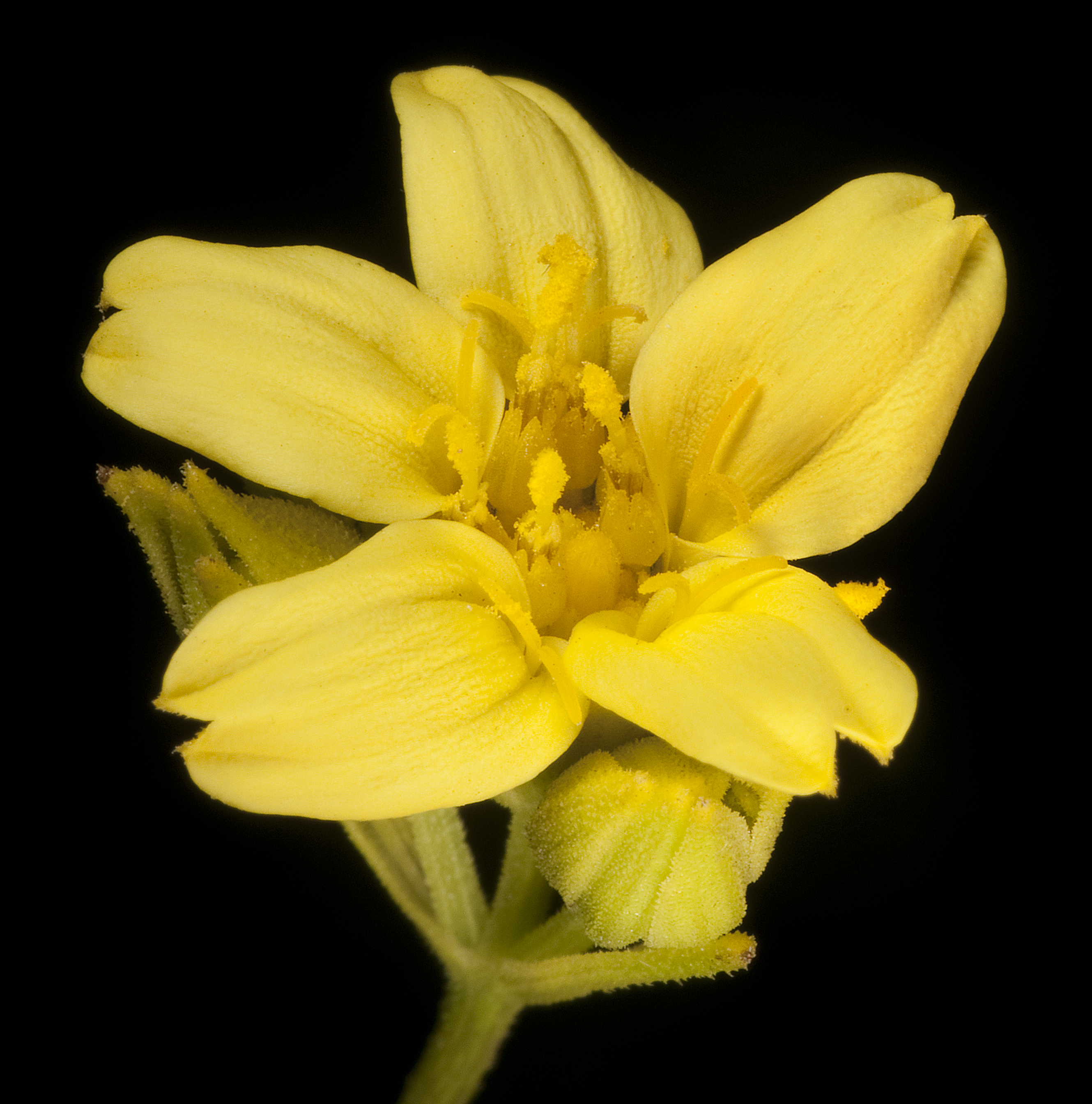
- Pentalepis trichodesmoides

Scientific classification
- Kingdom: Plantae
- Clade: Tracheophytes
- Clade: Angiosperms
- Clade: Eudicots
- Clade: Asterids
- Order: Asterales
- Family: Asteraceae
- Subfamily: Asteroideae
- Tribe: Heliantheae
- Subtribe: Ecliptinae
- Genus: Pentalepis; F.Muell.

Species
- See text

= Pentalepis =

Genus of daisy

Pentalepis is a genus of flowering plants in the family Asteraceae which is endemic to Australia and found only in the Northern Territory and Western Australia.

The genus was first described by Ferdinand von Mueller in 1863.

== Etymology ==
The genus name, Pentalepis, comes from the Greek for "five" (penta) and "scale" (lepis), and refers to the single whorl of five bracts that surrounds the inflorescence.

== Species ==
There are 6 accepted species:

- Pentalepis ecliptoides F.Muell.
- Pentalepis grandis E.W.Cross
- Pentalepis kakaduensis E.W.Cross
- Pentalepis linearifolia Orchard
- Pentalepis trichodesmoides F.Muell.
- Pentalepis walcottii E.W.Cross
