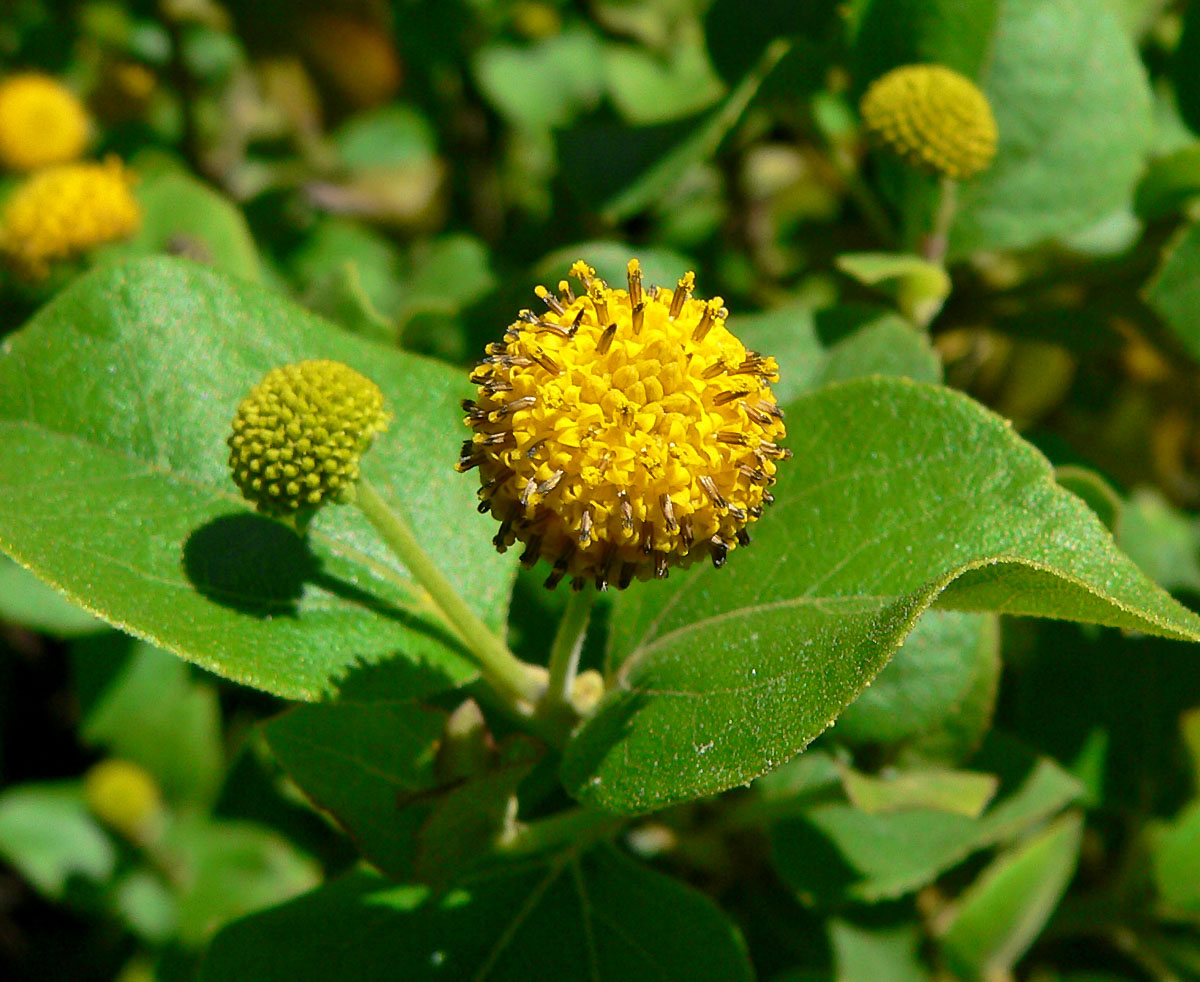
- Podanthus ovatifolius

Scientific classification
- Kingdom: Plantae
- Clade: Tracheophytes
- Clade: Angiosperms
- Clade: Eudicots
- Clade: Asterids
- Order: Asterales
- Family: Asteraceae
- Subtribe: Ecliptinae
- Genus: Podanthus; Lag.

Type species
- Podanthus ovatifolius Lag.

Synonyms
- Euxenia Cham.

= Podanthus =

Species of plant

Podanthus is a genus of Chilean plants in the tribe Heliantheae within the family Asteraceae.

Species

- Podanthus mitiqui Lindl. - Chile (Coquimbo, Santiago, Maule, Valparaíso, O'Higgins)
- Podanthus ovatifolius Lag. - Chile (Biobío, Coquimbo, Maule, La Araucania, Valparaíso, O'Higgins)
