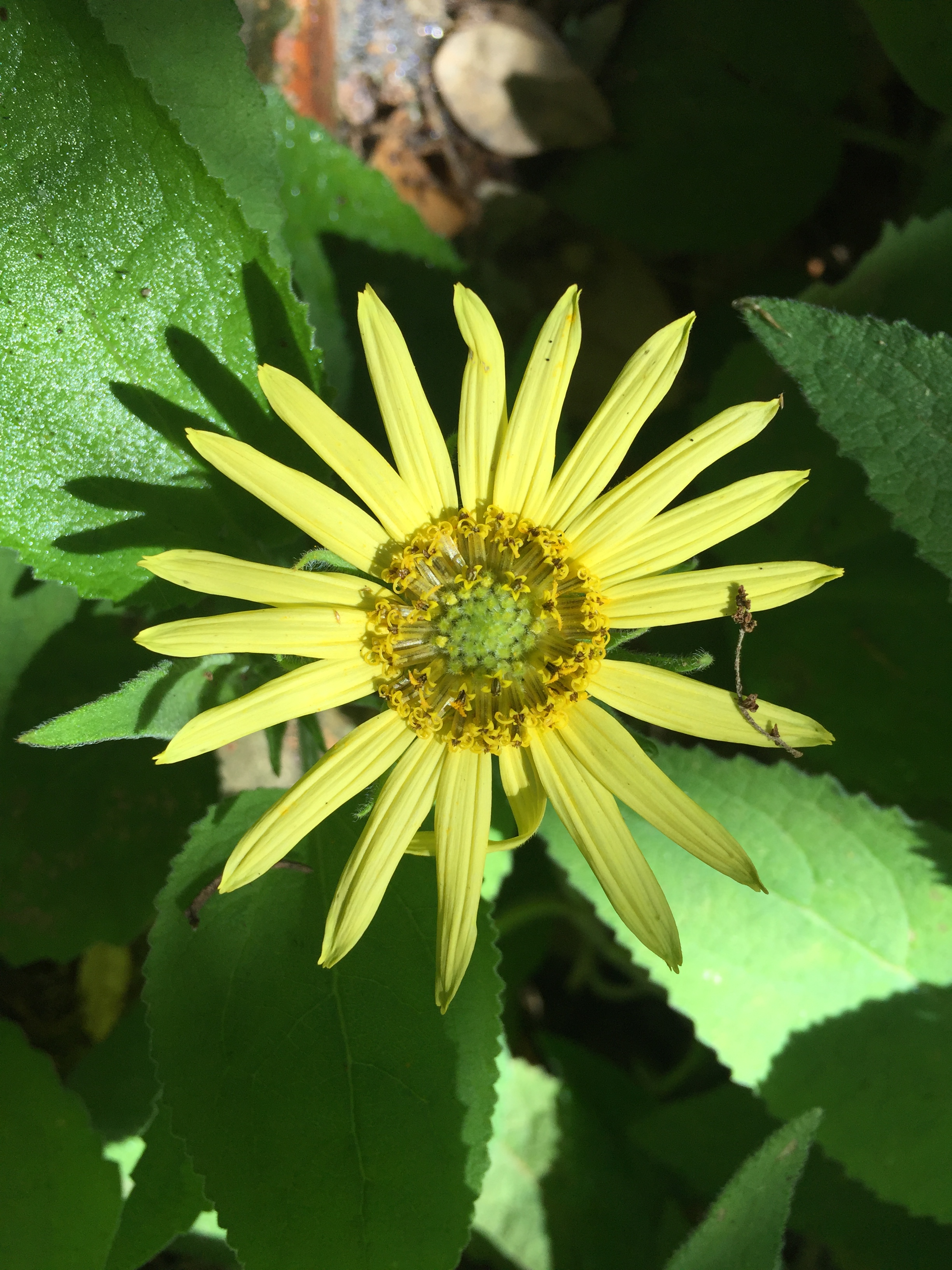
- Cultivated Vigethia mexicana in bloom

Scientific classification
- Kingdom: Plantae
- Clade: Embryophytes
- Clade: Tracheophytes
- Clade: Angiosperms
- Clade: Eudicots
- Clade: Asterids
- Order: Asterales
- Family: Asteraceae
- Subfamily: Asteroideae
- Tribe: Heliantheae
- Subtribe: Engelmanniinae
- Genus: Vigethia; W.A.Weber
- Species: V. mexicana

Binomial name
- Vigethia mexicana (S.Watson) W.A.Weber

Synonyms
- Wyethia mexicana S. Watson

= Vigethia =

Genus of flowering plants

Vigethia is a genus of Mexican flowering plants in the tribe Heliantheae within the family Asteraceae.

Species

There is only one known species, Vigethia mexicana, called the Mexican green-eyed sunflower, native to the State of Nuevo León in northern Mexico.
