= Neoblakea =

Scientific classification
- Kingdom: Plantae
- Clade: Tracheophytes
- Clade: Angiosperms
- Clade: Eudicots
- Clade: Asterids
- Order: Gentianales
- Family: Rubiaceae
- Genus: Neoblakea; Standl.

Genus of plants

Neoblakea is a genus of flowering plants belonging to the family Rubiaceae.

It is native to Venezuela and Ecuador.

The genus name of Neoblakea is in honour of Sidney Fay Blake (1892–1959), an American botanist and plant taxonomist, and it was first described and published in Publ. Field Mus. Nat. Hist., Bot. Series 8, on page 54 in 1930.

== Known species ==
According to Kew:

- Neoblakea ecuadorensis C.M.Taylor
- Neoblakea venezuelensis Standl.
