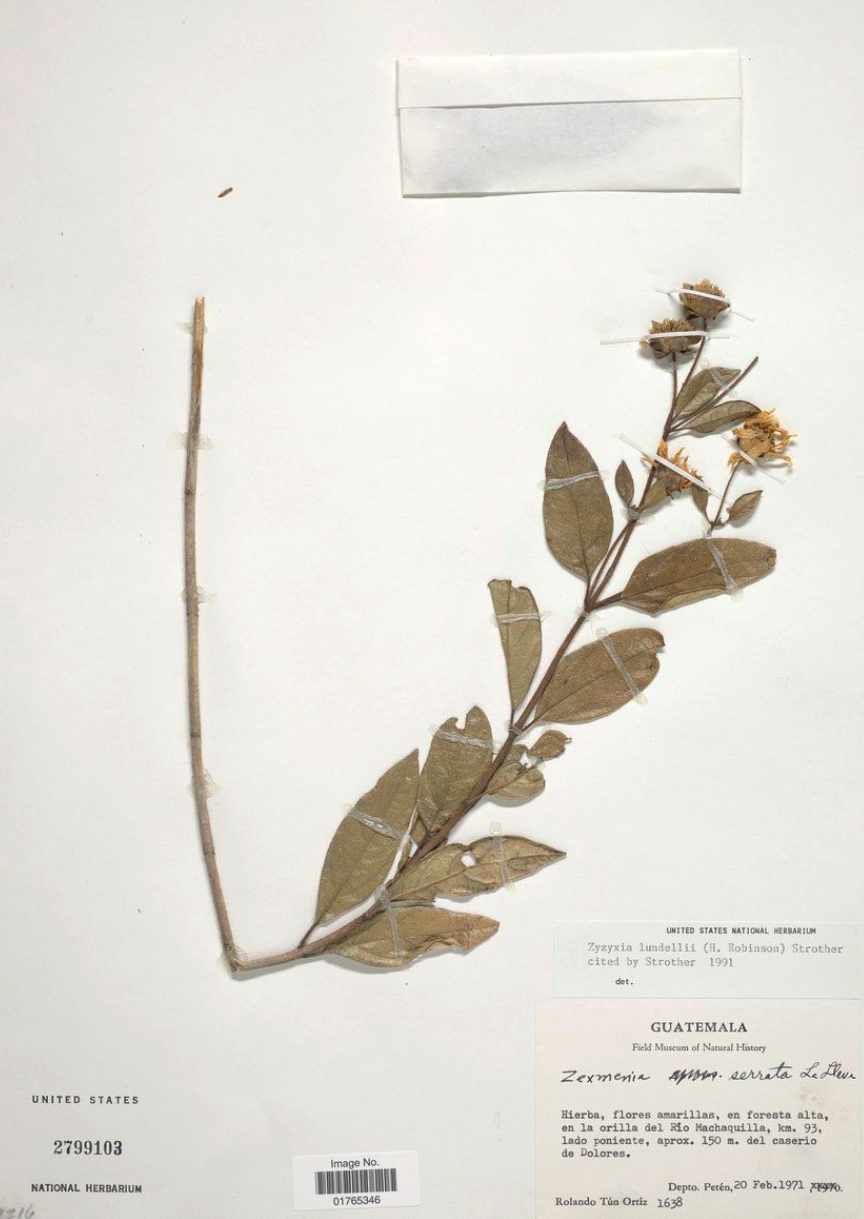

Scientific classification
- Kingdom: Plantae
- Clade: Embryophytes
- Clade: Tracheophytes
- Clade: Spermatophytes
- Clade: Angiosperms
- Clade: Eudicots
- Clade: Asterids
- Order: Asterales
- Family: Asteraceae
- Subfamily: Asteroideae
- Tribe: Heliantheae
- Subtribe: Ecliptinae
- Genus: Zyzyxia; Strother, 1991
- Species: Z. lundellii

Binomial name
- Zyzyxia lundellii (H.Robinson) Strother, 1991

Synonyms
- Lasianthaea lundellii (H.Rob.) B.L.Turner; Oyedaea lundellii H.Robinson, 1981

= Zyzyxia =

Species of plant

Zyzyxia is a genus of tropical shrubs in the family Asteraceae native to Central America. There is only one known species, Zyzyxia lundellii.

== Description and distribution ==
Zyzyxia is a shrub that grows to 3 meters tall. Its leaves are covered in very rough hairs. The ray and disc petals are both yellow, and the fruits are brown.

All known collections of Zyzyxia come from Guatemala and Belize. There, the shrubs grow in dry tropical forests of pine or ericaceous scrub forest.

== Naming ==
Around 1990, John L. Strother was revising the six North American genera of the subtribe Ecliptinae in the sunflower family (Asteraceae) for publication in Systematic Botany Monographs. He carefully examined species in the genus Wedelia, and decided that "something was looking odd and different" in some of the specimens. For one, the achenes (fruits) did not have a thin winged membrane around the edge as other species in the genus were supposed to have. Strother decided that the plant was actually a new and previously unnamed genus of plant.

By this time, the lengthy monograph he had written was in the final stages of proofing for publication. His editor insisted that the genera be treated alphabetically, and to insert a new genus in the middle of his 100-page treatment would mean numerous changes to the format and layout of the article. The only way the editor would accept the new genus was if it were placed alphabetically after the last genus in the article, Zexmenia. This would put it nearly at the end of the article, and minimize the changes needed for publication.

Knowing this, Strother decided he might as well make the genus the last one likely ever to exist in any list, and named the plant Zyzyxia.
