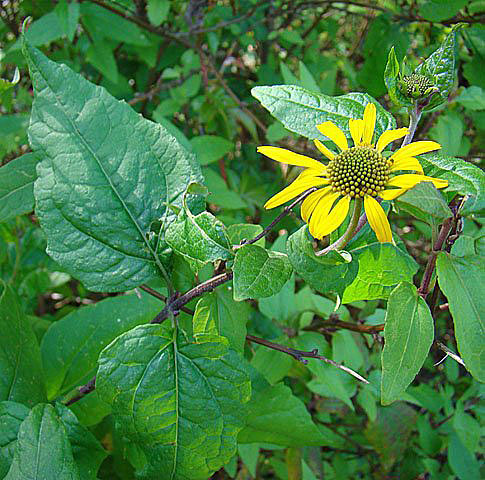

Scientific classification
- Kingdom: Plantae
- Clade: Tracheophytes
- Clade: Angiosperms
- Clade: Eudicots
- Clade: Asterids
- Order: Asterales
- Family: Asteraceae
- Subfamily: Asteroideae
- Tribe: Heliantheae
- Subtribe: Ecliptinae
- Genus: Leptocarpha; DC.
- Species: L. rivularis

Binomial name
- Leptocarpha rivularis DC.

= Leptocarpha =

Genus of plants

Leptocarpha is a monotypic genus of flowering plants in the family Asteraceae. It is endemic to central Chile.

== Species ==
There is only one known species, Leptocarpha rivularis, native to the La Araucania Region of Chile.
