= Exomiocarpon =

Scientific classification
- Kingdom: Plantae
- Clade: Tracheophytes
- Clade: Angiosperms
- Clade: Eudicots
- Clade: Asterids
- Order: Asterales
- Family: Asteraceae
- Subfamily: Asteroideae
- Tribe: Heliantheae
- Subtribe: Ecliptinae
- Genus: Exomiocarpon; Lawalrée
- Species: E. madagascariense

Binomial name
- Exomiocarpon madagascariense (Humbert) Lawalrée

Synonyms
- Eleutheranthera madagascariensis Humbert

Genus of flowering plants

Exomiocarpon is a genus of flowering plants in the family Asteraceae.

There is only one known species, Exomiocarpon madagascariense, endemic to Madagascar.
