= Damnxanthodium =

Scientific classification
- Kingdom: Plantae
- Clade: Embryophytes
- Clade: Tracheophytes
- Clade: Angiosperms
- Clade: Eudicots
- Clade: Asterids
- Order: Asterales
- Family: Asteraceae
- Subfamily: Asteroideae
- Tribe: Heliantheae
- Subtribe: Ecliptinae
- Genus: Damnxanthodium; Strother
- Species: D. calvum

Binomial name
- Damnxanthodium calvum (Greenm.) Strother

Synonyms
- Perymenium calvum Greenm.; Lasianthaea calva (Greenm.) B.L. Turner

Genus of flowering plants

Damnxanthodium is a monotypic genus of flowering plants in the family Asteraceae, containing the single species Damnxanthodium calvum. It is native to northern Mexico.

The plant was separated from the genus Perymenium. It was given the new genus name Damnxanthodium because it is difficult to distinguish from similar asters.
