= Stuessya =

Scientific classification
- Kingdom: Plantae
- Clade: Tracheophytes
- Clade: Angiosperms
- Clade: Eudicots
- Clade: Asterids
- Order: Asterales
- Family: Asteraceae
- Subfamily: Asteroideae
- Tribe: Heliantheae
- Subtribe: Helianthinae
- Genus: Stuessya; B.L.Turner & F.G.Davies

Type species
- Stuessya perennans B.L.Turner & F.G.Davies

Genus of plants

Stuessya is a genus of Mexican plants in the tribe Heliantheae within the family Asteraceae.

Species

- Stuessya apiculata (S.F.Blake) B.L.Turner & F.G.Davies - Michoacán, Guerrero
- Stuessya perennans B.L.Turner & F.G.Davies - Michoacán

formerly included

see Viguiera

- Stuessya michoacana - Viguiera michoacana
