= Squamopappus =

Scientific classification
- Kingdom: Plantae
- Clade: Tracheophytes
- Clade: Angiosperms
- Clade: Eudicots
- Clade: Asterids
- Order: Asterales
- Family: Asteraceae
- Subfamily: Asteroideae
- Tribe: Heliantheae
- Subtribe: Verbesininae
- Genus: Squamopappus; R.K.Jansen, N.A.Harriman & Urbatsch
- Species: S. skutchii

Binomial name
- Squamopappus skutchii (S.F.Blake) R.K.Jansen, N.A.Harriman & Urbatsch

Synonyms
- Podachaenium skutchii (S.F.Blake) H.Rob.; Calea skutchii S.F. Blake

Genus of plants

Squamopappus is a genus of Mesoamerican plants in the tribe Heliantheae within the family Asteraceae.

The only known species is Squamopappus skutchii native to Chiapas and Guatemala.
