= Erigeron cavernensis =

Conservation status
- Critically Imperiled (NatureServe)

Scientific classification
- Kingdom: Plantae
- Clade: Tracheophytes
- Clade: Angiosperms
- Clade: Eudicots
- Clade: Asterids
- Order: Asterales
- Family: Asteraceae
- Genus: Erigeron
- Species: E. cavernensis

Binomial name
- Erigeron cavernensis S.L.Welsh & N.D.Atwood

Species of flowering plant

Erigeron cavernensis is a North American species of flowering plants in the family Asteraceae known by the common name lone fleabane. It has been found only in the State of Nevada in the western United States, on ridges, cliff faces, and rocky outcrops at high elevations in the mountains of Nye and White Pine Counties.

Erigeron cavernensis is a very small perennial herb up rarely more than 6 cm (2.4 inches) tall, forming clumps of many individuals close together. Most of the leaves are low and close to the ground. Each stem produces only one flower head, with 12–24 white, pink or lavender ray florets plus numerous yellow disc florets.
