= Perymeniopsis =

Scientific classification
- Kingdom: Plantae
- Clade: Tracheophytes
- Clade: Angiosperms
- Clade: Eudicots
- Clade: Asterids
- Order: Asterales
- Family: Asteraceae
- Subfamily: Asteroideae
- Tribe: Heliantheae
- Subtribe: Ecliptinae
- Genus: Perymeniopsis; H.Rob. 1978 not Sch.Bip. ex Klatt 1887 (the latter not validly published because given as synonym)
- Species: P. ovalifolia

Binomial name
- Perymeniopsis ovalifolia (A.Gray) H.Rob.

Synonyms
- Oyedaea ovalifolia A.Gray; Perymenium ovalifolium (A.Gray) B.L.Turner

Genus of flowering plants

Perymeniopsis is a genus of flowering plants in the family Asteraceae.

There is only one known species, Perymeniopsis ovalifolia, native to Mexico (Oaxaca, Veracruz, Tamaulipas, San Luis Potosí).
