= Oteiza (plant) =

Scientific classification
- Kingdom: Plantae
- Clade: Tracheophytes
- Clade: Angiosperms
- Clade: Eudicots
- Clade: Asterids
- Order: Asterales
- Family: Asteraceae
- Subfamily: Asteroideae
- Tribe: Millerieae
- Subtribe: Galinsoginae
- Genus: Oteiza; La Llave

Type species
- Oteiza acuminata La Llave

Synonyms
- Calea sect. Oteiza (La Llave) Benth. & Hook.f.; Calea subgen. Oteiza (La Llave) B.L.Rob. & Greenm.

Genus of flowering plants

Oteiza is a genus of Mesoamerican flowering plants in the tribe Millerieae within the family Asteraceae.

Species

- Oteiza acuminata La Llave : from San Luis Potosí to Oaxaca
- Oteiza mixtecana Villaseñor & Panero, Oaxaca
- Oteiza ruacophila (Donn.Sm.) J.J. Fay, Guatemala
- Oteiza scandens Panero & Villaseñor, Oaxaca
