= Otopappus =

Scientific classification
- Kingdom: Plantae
- Clade: Tracheophytes
- Clade: Angiosperms
- Clade: Eudicots
- Clade: Asterids
- Order: Asterales
- Family: Asteraceae
- Subfamily: Asteroideae
- Tribe: Heliantheae
- Subtribe: Ecliptinae
- Genus: Otopappus; Benth.

Type species
- Otopappus verbesinoides Benth.

Synonyms
- Notoptera Urb.; Zexmenia sect. Otopappus (Benth.) O.Hoffm.

Genus of flowering plants

Otopappus is a genus of flowering plants in the tribe Heliantheae within the family Asteraceae, primarily Mesoamerican but with one species from Jamaica.

Species

- Otopappus acuminatus S.Watson – Jalisco
- Otopappus brevipes B.L.Rob. – from Chiapas to Nicaragua
- Otopappus calarcanus S.Díaz – Colombia
- Otopappus curviflorus (R.Br.) Hemsl. – from Veracruz to Nicaragua
- Otopappus epaleaceus Hemsl. – from Puebla to Guatemala
- Otopappus glabratus (J.M.Coult.) S.F.Blake – Guatemala, Honduras, El Salvador
- Otopappus guatemalensis (Urb.) R.L.Hartm. & Stuessy – Guatemala, Belize, Yucatán
- Otopappus hirsutus (Sw.) R.L.Hartm. & Stuessy – Jamaica
- Otopappus imbricatus (Sch.Bip.) S.F.Blake – Puebla, Morelos, Michoacán, Guerrero
- Otopappus koelzii McVaugh – Michoacán, Colima, Jalisco
- Otopappus mexicanus (Rzed.) H.Rob. – Guerrero, Oaxaca
- Otopappus microcephalus S.F.Blake – Colima, Jalisco, Guerrero, Oaxaca
- Otopappus robustus Hemsl. – Veracruz
- Otopappus scaber S.F.Blake – Guatemala, Belize, Yucatán, Chiapas
- Otopappus syncephalus Donn.Sm. – Guatemala
- Otopappus tequilanus (A.Gray) B.L.Rob. – Sinaloa, Jalisco, Nayarit, Michoacán, Guerrero, Oaxaca
- Otopappus verbesinoides Benth. – from Oaxaca to Nicaragua

formerly included

Several species one included in Otopappus are now regarded as better suited to other genera: Lundellianthus Oblivia Verbesina
