= Plagiolophus millspaughii =

Scientific classification
- Kingdom: Plantae
- Clade: Tracheophytes
- Clade: Angiosperms
- Clade: Eudicots
- Clade: Asterids
- Order: Asterales
- Family: Asteraceae
- Subfamily: Asteroideae
- Tribe: Heliantheae
- Subtribe: Ecliptinae
- Genus: Plagiolophus; Greenm.
- Species: P. millspaughii

Binomial name
- Plagiolophus millspaughii Greenm.

Genus of plants

Plagiolophus is a genus of Mexican plants in the tribe Heliantheae within the family Asteraceae.

Species

The only known species is Plagiolophus millspaughii, native to the Yucatán Peninsula in Mexico (States of Yucatán and Campeche).
