= Wamalchitamia =

Scientific classification
- Kingdom: Plantae
- Clade: Tracheophytes
- Clade: Angiosperms
- Clade: Eudicots
- Clade: Asterids
- Order: Asterales
- Family: Asteraceae
- Subfamily: Asteroideae
- Tribe: Heliantheae
- Subtribe: Ecliptinae
- Genus: Wamalchitamia; Strother

Type species
- Wamalchitamia aurantiaca (Klatt) Strother (Zexmenia aurantiaca Klatt)

Genus of flowering plants

Wamalchitamia is a genus of Mesoamerican flowering plants in the family Asteraceae.

Species

- Wamalchitamia appressipila (S.F.Blake) Strother - Chiapas
- Wamalchitamia aurantiaca (Klatt) Strother - Chiapas, Oaxaca, Guatemala, Honduras, Nicaragua, Costa Rica
- Wamalchitamia dionysi Strother - Chiapas
- Wamalchitamia strigosa (DC.) Strother - Chiapas, Oaxaca
- Wamalchitamia williamsii (Standl. & Steyerm.) Strother - Honduras, Nicaragua
