= Lipotriche =

Scientific classification
- Kingdom: Plantae
- Clade: Tracheophytes
- Clade: Angiosperms
- Clade: Eudicots
- Clade: Asterids
- Order: Asterales
- Family: Asteraceae
- Subfamily: Asteroideae
- Tribe: Heliantheae
- Subtribe: Ecliptinae
- Genus: Lipotriche; R.Br.

Species
- 12; see text

Synonyms
- Psathurochaeta DC.; Trigonotheca Sch.Bip.; Wuerschmittia Sch.Bip. ex Walp.

Genus of flowering plants

Lipotriche is a genus of flowering plants in the family Asteraceae. It includes 12 species native to sub-Saharan Africa, Madagascar, and Yemen.

== Species ==
12 species are accepted.

- Lipotriche abyssinica (Sch.Bip. ex A.Rich.) Orchard – tropical Africa and Yemen
- Lipotriche elliptica (O.Hoffm.) D.J.N.Hind – west and west-central tropical Africa
- Lipotriche felicis (C.D.Adams) D.J.N.Hind – Guinea
- Lipotriche gambica (Hutch. & Dalziel) Orchard – west Africa
- Lipotriche marlothiana (O.Hoffm.) D.J.N.Hind – tropical Africa
- Lipotriche pungens (Oliv. & Hiern) Orchard – tropical Africa
- Lipotriche rhombifolia (O.Hoffm. & Muschl.) D.J.N.Hind – west and west-central Africa
- Lipotriche richardsiae (Wild) D.J.N.Hind – central Africa
- Lipotriche robinsonii (Wild) D.J.N.Hind – Democratic Republic of the Congo, Tanzania, and Zambia
- Lipotriche scaberrima (Hiern) D.J.N.Hind – Angola
- Lipotriche scandens (Schumach. & Thonn.) Orchard – sub-Saharan Africa and Madagascar
- Lipotriche tithonioides (Aké Assi) D.J.N.Hind – Guinea and Côte d'Ivoire
