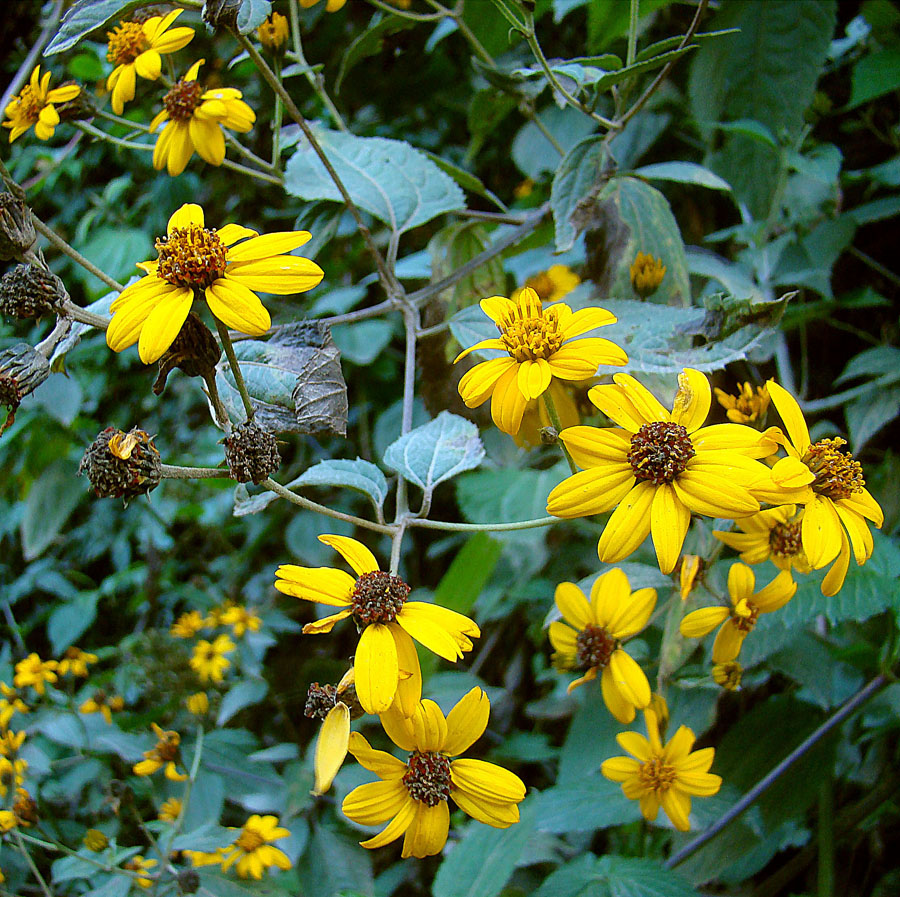
- Lasianthaea fruticosa

Scientific classification
- Kingdom: Plantae
- Clade: Tracheophytes
- Clade: Angiosperms
- Clade: Eudicots
- Clade: Asterids
- Order: Asterales
- Family: Asteraceae
- Subfamily: Asteroideae
- Tribe: Heliantheae
- Subtribe: Ecliptinae
- Genus: Lasianthaea; DC.

Type species
- Lasianthaea helianthoides Zucc. ex DC.

Synonyms
- Telesia Raf.; Lasianthea Endl.

= Lasianthaea =

Genus of flowering plants

Lasianthaea is a genus of flowering plants in the family Asteraceae. The species are native primarily to Mexico, with one species extending just over the border into the United States and another south to northwestern South America.

Species

- Lasianthaea aurea (D.Don) K.M.Becker - México State
- Lasianthaea beckeri B.L.Turner - Jalisco
- Lasianthaea ceanothifolia (Willd.) K.M.Becker - central Mexico
- Lasianthaea crocea (A.Gray) K.M.Becker - Oaxaca, Jalisco, Morelos, Nayarit, Michoacán, México State
- Lasianthaea fruticosa (L.) K.M.Becker - Mexico, Central America, Colombia, Venezuela
- Lasianthaea gentryi B.L.Turner - Sinaloa
- Lasianthaea helianthoides Zucc. ex DC. - Oaxaca, Jalisco, Morelos, Nayarit, Michoacán, México State
- Lasianthaea machucana B.L.Turner - Jalisco
- Lasianthaea macrocephala (Hook. & Arn.) K.M.Becker - Oaxaca, Jalisco, Morelos, Nayarit, Michoacán, México State, Colima, Sinaloa
- Lasianthaea palmeri (Greenm.) K.M.Becker - Jalisco, Chihuahua, Nayarit, Zacatecas
- Lasianthaea podocephala (A.Gray) K.M.Becker - Chihuahua, Sonora, Sinaloa, Arizona (Pima, Santa Cruz, Cochise Cos), New Mexico (Hidalgo Co)
- Lasianthaea ritovegana B.L.Turner - Sinaloa
- Lasianthaea rosei (Greenm.) McVaugh - Nayarit
- Lasianthaea seemannii (A.Gray) K.M.Becker - Nayarit, Sonora
- Lasianthaea squarrosa (Greenm. ex Greenm.) K.M.Becker - Guerrero
- Lasianthaea zinnioides (Hemsl.) K.M.Becker - Nayarit
