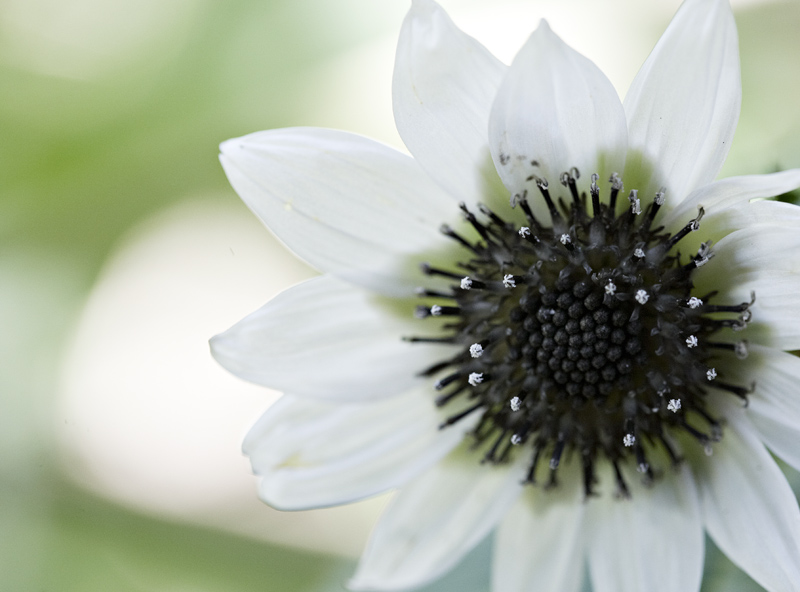

Scientific classification
- Kingdom: Plantae
- Clade: Tracheophytes
- Clade: Angiosperms
- Clade: Eudicots
- Clade: Asterids
- Order: Asterales
- Family: Asteraceae
- Subfamily: Asteroideae
- Tribe: Heliantheae
- Subtribe: Rojasianthinae; Panero
- Genus: Rojasianthe; Standl. & Steyerm.
- Species: R. superba

Binomial name
- Rojasianthe superba Standl. & Steyerm.

= Rojasianthe =

Genus of plants

Rojasianthe is a genus of Mesoamerican flowering plants in the family Asteraceae.

The only known species is Rojasianthe superba, the white sunflower tree, native to Chiapas and Guatemala.
