= Steiractinia =

Scientific classification
- Kingdom: Plantae
- Clade: Tracheophytes
- Clade: Angiosperms
- Clade: Eudicots
- Clade: Asterids
- Order: Asterales
- Family: Asteraceae
- Subfamily: Asteroideae
- Tribe: Heliantheae
- Subtribe: Ecliptinae
- Genus: Steiractinia; S.F.Blake

Type species
- Steiractinia mollis (syn of S. sodiroi) S.F.Blake

Genus of plants

Steiractinia is a genus of South American plants in the tribe Heliantheae within the family Asteraceae.

== Species ==
14 species are accepted.

- Steiractinia aspera Cuatrec. – Colombia
- Steiractinia cupulifera Cuatrec. – Colombia
- Steiractinia glandulosa S.F.Blake – Colombia
- Steiractinia grantii Cuatrec. – Colombia
- Steiractinia helianthoides (Triana) S.Díaz & Vélez-Nauer – Colombia
- Steiractinia klattii S.F.Blake – Colombia
- Steiractinia lucidula S.F.Blake – Colombia
- Steiractinia meridensis Aristeg. – Colombia (Norte de Santander) and northwestern Venezuela
- Steiractinia ocanensis S.F.Blake – Colombia
- Steiractinia rusbyana S.F.Blake – Colombia
- Steiractinia sararensis Cuatrec. – Colombia
- Steiractinia schlimii S.F.Blake – Colombia
- Steiractinia sodiroi S.F.Blake – Colombia and Ecuador
- Steiractinia tachirensis Aristeg. – Venezuela
