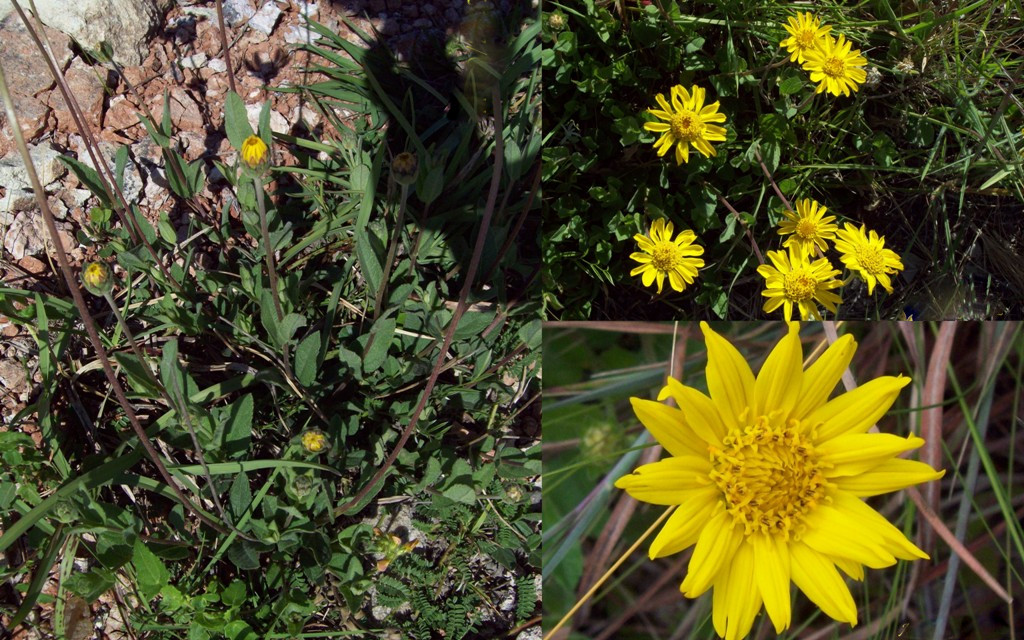
- Dimerostemma grisebachii

Scientific classification
- Kingdom: Plantae
- Clade: Embryophytes
- Clade: Tracheophytes
- Clade: Angiosperms
- Clade: Eudicots
- Clade: Asterids
- Order: Asterales
- Family: Asteraceae
- Subfamily: Asteroideae
- Tribe: Heliantheae
- Subtribe: Ecliptinae
- Genus: Dimerostemma; Cass.

Type species
- Dimerostemma brasilianum Cass.

Synonyms
- Dimenostemma Steud.; Angelphytum G.M.Barroso

= Dimerostemma =

Genus of flowering plants

Dimerostemma is a genus of flowering plants in the family Asteraceae. It now includes all the species in the former genus Angelphytum as the two were merged in 2007.

Most species occur in Brazil, with a few in Bolivia.

== Species ==
The following species are recognised in the genus Dimerostemma:

- Dimerostemma annuum (Hassl.) H.Rob. - Mato Grosso do Sul, Peru, Paraguay
- Dimerostemma apense (Chodat) M.D.Moraes
- Dimerostemma arnottii (Baker) M.D.Moraes
- Dimerostemma asperatum S.F.Blake - Brasilia, Goiás, Mato Grosso do Sul, Minas Gerais, Rondônia, Bolivia
- Dimerostemma aspilioides (Griseb.) M.D.Moraes
- Dimerostemma bahiense (H.Rob.) M.D.Moraes - Bahia
- Dimerostemma bishopii H.Rob. - west-central Brazil
- Dimerostemma brasilianum Cass. - Brasilia, Goiás, Mato Grosso do Sul, Minas Gerais, São Paulo, Bolivia
- Dimerostemma episcopale (H.Rob.) H.Rob.
- Dimerostemma goyazense (Gardner) M.D.Moraes - Goiás, Minas Gerais
- Dimerostemma grazielae H.Rob.
- Dimerostemma grisebachii (Baker) M.D.Moraes
- Dimerostemma hatschbachii (H.Rob.) M.D.Moraes
- Dimerostemma herzogii (Hassl.) M.D.Moraes - Bolivia
- Dimerostemma hieronymi (Hassl.) M.D.Moraes
- Dimerostemma humboldtianum (Gardner) H.Rob. - Brasilia, Goiás, Minas Gerais
- Dimerostemma indutum (Chodat) M.D.Moraes
- Dimerostemma lippioides S.F.Blake - Brasilia, Goiás, Mato Grosso, Minas Gerais, São Paulo, Bahia
- Dimerostemma matogrossense (G.M.Barroso) M.D.Moraes
- Dimerostemma myrtifolium (Chodat) M.D.Moraes
- Dimerostemma oblongum (Gardner) M.D.Moraes - Minas Gerais
- Dimerostemma oppositifolium (A.A.Sáenz) M.D.Moraes
- Dimerostemma paneroi M.D.Moraes
- Dimerostemma paraguariense (Chodat) M.D.Moraes
- Dimerostemma pseudosilphioides (Hassl.) M.D.Moraes
- Dimerostemma reitzii (H.Rob.) M.D.Moraes - Mato Grosso do Sul, Paraná, Santa Catarina
- Dimerostemma retifolium S.F.Blake - Goiás, Mato Grosso do Sul
- Dimerostemma scabrosum V.R.Bueno & J.N.Nakaj.
- Dimerostemma tenuifolium (Hassl.) M.D.Moraes
- Dimerostemma vestitum S.F.Blake - Brasilia, Goiás, Minas Gerais
- Dimerostemma virgosum H.Rob. - Mato Grosso do Sul
