= Tuxtla pittieri =

Scientific classification
- Kingdom: Plantae
- Clade: Tracheophytes
- Clade: Angiosperms
- Clade: Eudicots
- Clade: Asterids
- Order: Asterales
- Family: Asteraceae
- Subfamily: Asteroideae
- Tribe: Heliantheae
- Subtribe: Ecliptinae
- Genus: Tuxtla; Villaseñor & Strother
- Species: T. pittieri

Binomial name
- Tuxtla pittieri (Greenm.) Villaseñor & Strother

Synonyms
- Zexmenia pittieri Greenm.

Species of flowering plant

Tuxtla is a genus of Mesoamerican flowering plants, in the family Asteraceae.

Species

There is only one known species, Tuxtla pittieri, native to Costa Rica and to the Los Tuxtlas region in the State of Veracruz in eastern Mexico.
