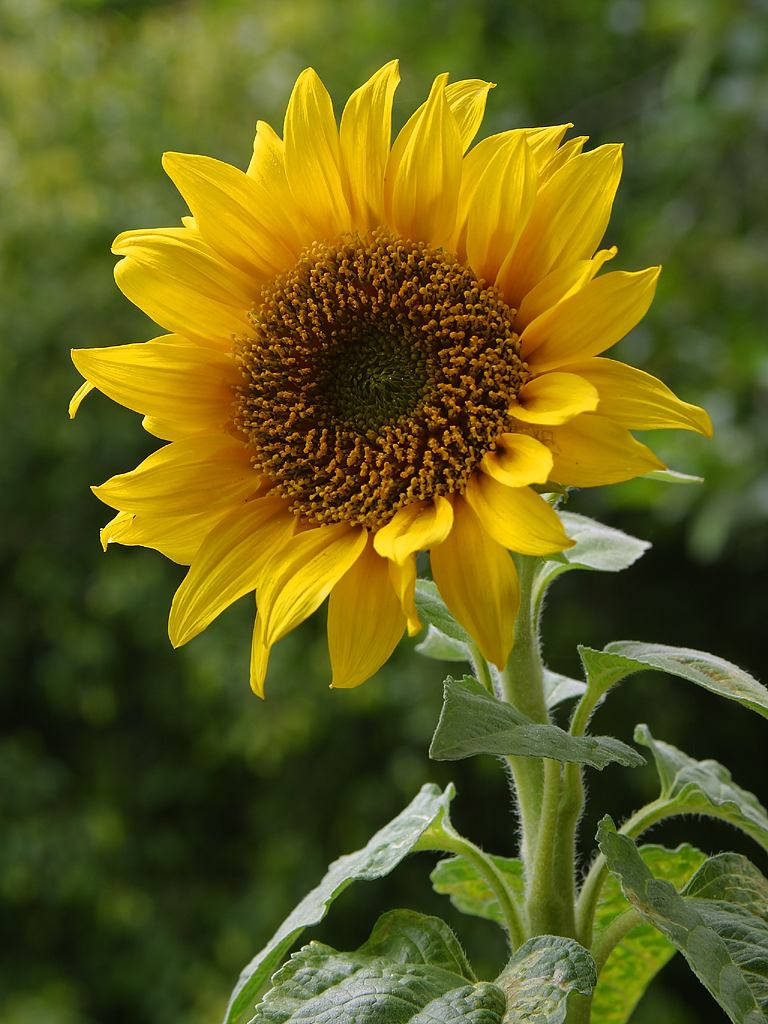
- Sunflowers display bright yellow colors.

Scientific classification
- Kingdom: Plantae
- Clade: Tracheophytes
- Clade: Angiosperms
- Clade: Eudicots
- Clade: Asterids
- Order: Asterales
- Family: Asteraceae
- Subfamily: Asteroideae
- Tribe: Heliantheae; Cassini, 1819

Subtribes
- See text

Diversity
- About 190 genera and 2500 species

= Heliantheae =

Tribe of sunflower plants

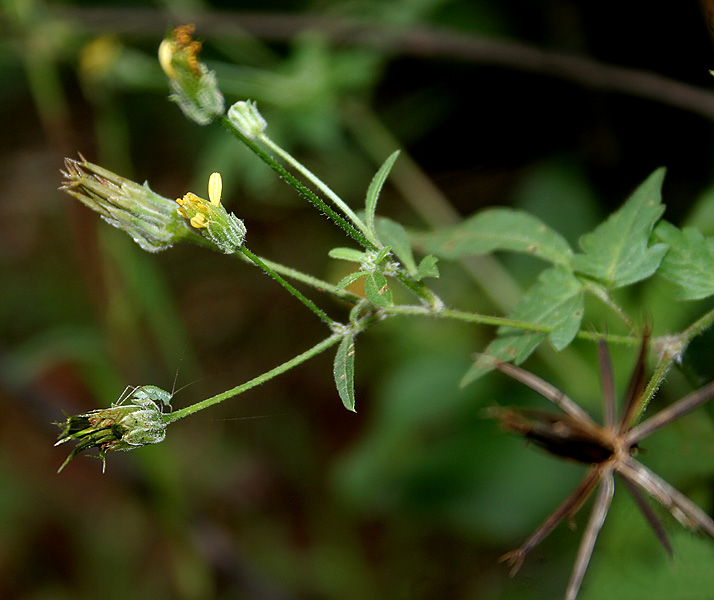
Bidens biternata- Spanish needles

The Heliantheae (sometimes called the sunflower tribe) are the third-largest tribe in the sunflower family (Asteraceae). With some 190 genera and nearly 2500 recognized species, only the tribes Senecioneae and Astereae are larger. The name is derived from the genus Helianthus, which is Greek for sun flower. Most genera and species are found in North America (particularly in Mexico) and South America. A few genera are pantropical.

Most Heliantheae are herbs or shrubs, but some grow to the size of small trees. Leaves are usually hairy and arranged in opposite pairs. The anthers are usually blackened.

The above statements about the size and distribution of the tribe apply to a broad definition of Heliantheae, which was followed throughout the 20th century. Some recent authors break the tribe up into a dozen or so smaller tribes.

== Uses ==
Commercially important plants in the Heliantheae include sunflower and Jerusalem artichoke. Many garden flowers are also in this group, such as Coreopsis, Cosmos, Echinacea, Rudbeckia, and Zinnia. Some authors separate Coreopsis and Cosmos into the Coreopsideae tribe.

In contrast to the benefits brought by the group, some are problematic weeds. Species of Ambrosia (ragweed) produce large quantities of highly allergenic pollen. Each plant is reputed to be able to produce about a billion grains of pollen over a season, and the plant is wind-pollinated.

== Taxonomy ==
The traditional circumscription of the Heliantheae arises from Cassini's 19th-century classification of the Asteraceae. This broad group been divided by some authors into smaller tribes: Bahieae, Chaenactideae, Coreopsideae, Helenieae, Heliantheae sensu stricto, Madieae, Millerieae, Perityleae, Polymnieae, and Tageteae. Because the Eupatorieae originated from within the Heliantheae (broadly defined), to maintain monophyletic taxa it is necessary to either make Eupatorieae a subtribe within Heliantheae or to split the Heliantheae into smaller tribes. Such classifications may define a supertribe Helianthodae including these smaller tribes, the Eupatorieae, and a few other tribes such as Inuleae.

=== Subtribes and genera ===
Heliantheae subtribes and genera recognized by the Global Compositae Database as of May 2022:

- Subtribe Ambrosiinae Less.
  - Ambrosia L.
  - Dicoria Torr. & A.Gray
  - Euphrosyne DC.
  - Hedosyne (A.Gray) Strother
  - Iva L.
  - Parthenice A.Gray
  - Parthenium L.
  - Xanthium L.
- Subtribe Chromolepidinae Panero
  - Chromolepis Benth.
- Subtribe Dugesiinae Panero
  - Dugesia A.Gray
- Subtribe Ecliptinae Less.
  - Aspilia Thouars
  - Baltimora L.
  - Blainvillea Cass.
  - Calyptocarpus Less.
  - Clibadium F.Allam. ex L.
  - Damnxanthodium Strother
  - Delilia Spreng.
  - Dimerostemma Cass.
  - Eclipta L.
  - Elaphandra Strother
  - Eleutheranthera Poit.
  - Exomiocarpon Lawalrée
  - Fenixia Merr.
  - Hoffmanniella Schltr. ex Lawalrée
  - Idiopappus H.Rob. & Panero
  - Iogeton Strother
  - Jefea Strother
  - Kingianthus H.Rob.
  - Lantanopsis C.Wright ex Griseb.
  - Lasianthaea DC.
  - Leptocarpha DC.
  - Lipochaeta DC.
  - Lipotriche R.Br.
  - Lundellianthus H.Rob.
  - Melanthera Rohr
  - Monactis Kunth
  - Oblivia Strother
  - Otopappus Benth.
  - Oyedaea DC.
  - Pascalia Ortega
  - Pentalepis F.Muell.
  - Perymeniopsis H.Rob.
  - Perymenium Schrad.
  - Plagiolophus Greenm.
  - Podanthus Lag.
  - Rensonia S.F.Blake
  - Riencourtia Cass.
  - Schizoptera Turcz.
  - Sphagneticola O.Hoffm.
  - Steiractinia S.F.Blake
  - Synedrella Gaertn.
  - Synedrellopsis Hieron. & Kuntze
  - Tilesia G.Mey.
  - Trigonopterum Hook.f.
  - Tuberculocarpus Pruski
  - Tuxtla Villaseñor & Strother
  - Wamalchitamia Strother
  - Wedelia Jacq.
  - Wollastonia DC. ex Decne
  - Zexmenia La Llave & Lex.
  - Zyzyxia Strother
- Subtribe Enceliinae Panero
  - Encelia Adans.
  - Enceliopsis (A.Gray) A.Nelson
  - Flourensia DC.
  - Geraea Torr. & A.Gray
  - Helianthella Torr. & A.Gray
- Subtribe Engelmanniinae Stuessy
  - Agnorhiza (Jeps.) W.A.Weber
  - Berlandiera DC.
  - Borrichia Adans.
  - Chrysogonum L.
  - Engelmannia A.Gray ex Nutt.
  - Lindheimera A.Gray & Engelm.
  - Silphium L.
  - Vigethia W.A.Weber
  - Wyethia Nutt. (including Balsamorhiza Hook. ex Nutt.)
- Subtribe Helianthinae Dumort
  - Aldama La Llave
  - Alvordia Brandegee
  - Bahiopsis Kellogg
  - Calanticaria (B.L.Rob. & Greenm.) E.E.Schill. & Panero
  - Davilanthus E.E.Schill. & Panero
  - Helianthus L.
  - Heliomeris Nutt.
  - Hymenostephium Benth.
  - Iostephane Benth.
  - Lagascea Cav.
  - Pappobolus S.F.Blake
  - Phoebanthus S.F.Blake
  - Rhysolepis S.F.Blake
  - Scalesia Arn. ex Arn.
  - Sclerocarpus Jacq.
  - Simsia Pers.
  - Stuessya B.L.Turner & F.G.Davies
  - Syncretocarpus S.F.Blake
  - Tithonia Desf. ex Juss.
  - Viguiera Kunth
- Subtribe Montanoinae H.Rob.
  - Montanoa Cerv.
- Subtribe Rojasianthinae Panero
  - Rojasianthe Standl. & Steyerm.
- Subtribe Rudbeckiinae H.Rob.
  - Ratibida Raf.
  - Rudbeckia L.
- Subtribe Spilanthinae Panero
  - Acmella Rich. ex Pers.
  - Oxycarpha S.F.Blake
  - Salmea DC.
  - Spilanthes Jacq.
  - Tetranthus Sw.
- Subtribe Verbesininae Benth. & Hook.f.
  - Podachaenium Benth.
  - Squamopappus R.K.Jansen, N.A.Harriman & Urbatsch
  - Tetrachyron Schltdl.
  - Verbesina L.
- Subtribe Zaluzaniinae H.Rob.
  - Hybridella Cass.
  - Zaluzania Pers.
- Subtribe Zinniinae Benth. & Hook.f.
  - Echinacea Moench
  - Heliopsis Pers.
  - Philactis Schrad.
  - Sanvitalia Lam.
  - Tehuana Panero & Villaseñor
  - Trichocoryne S.F.Blake
  - Zinnia L.

== Bibliography ==
- Funk, Vicki A.; Susanna, A.; Stuessy, T. F.; Bayer, R. J., eds. (2009). Systematics, Evolution, and Biogeography of Compositae. Vienna: International Association for Plant Taxonomy. ISBN 978-3-9501754-3-1.(Available here at Internet Archive)
- Panero, J L (2007). "Heliantheae". In Kadereit, Joachim W.; Jeffrey, Charles; Kubitzki, Klaus (eds.). The families and genera of vascular plants v. 8 Flowering Plants. Eudicots: Asterales. Springer Science & Business Media. pp. 440–477. ISBN 978-3-540-31051-8.
- Urbatsch, Lowell E.; Baldwin, Bruce G.; Donoghue, Michael J. (July 2000). "Phylogeny of the Coneflowers and Relatives (Heliantheae: Asteraceae) Based on Nuclear rDNA Internal Transcribed Spacer (ITS) Sequences and Chlorplast DNA Restriction Site Data". Systematic Botany. 25 (3): 539. Bibcode:2000SysBo..25..539U. doi:10.2307/2666695. JSTOR 2666695. S2CID 28581817.
- Bremer, Kåre. (1994). Asteraceae: Cladistics & Classification. Portland, OR: Timber Press. ISBN 0-88192-275-7.
- Robinson, Harold Ernest. (1981). A Revision of the Tribal and Subtribal Limits of the Heliantheae (Asteraceae). Smithsonian Contributions to Botany: 51.
- Strother, John L. (1991). Taxonomy of Complaya, Elaphandra, Iogeton, Jefea, Wamalchitamia, Wedelia, Zexmenia, and Zyzyxia (Compositae - Heliantheae - Ecliptinae). Systematic Botany Monographs: 33. ISBN 0-912861-33-9
