= Lundellianthus =

Scientific classification
- Kingdom: Plantae
- Clade: Tracheophytes
- Clade: Angiosperms
- Clade: Eudicots
- Clade: Asterids
- Order: Asterales
- Family: Asteraceae
- Subfamily: Asteroideae
- Tribe: Heliantheae
- Subtribe: Ecliptinae
- Genus: Lundellianthus; H.Rob.

Type species
- Lundellianthus petenensis H.Rob.

Genus of flowering plants

Lundellianthus is a genus of Mesoamerican flowering plants in the tribe Heliantheae within the family Asteraceae.

Species

- Lundellianthus belizeanus (B.L.Turner) Strother - Belize
- Lundellianthus breedlovei (B.L.Turner) Strother - Chiapas
- Lundellianthus guatemalensis (Donn.Sm.) Strother - Guatemala, Belize, Chiapas, Quintana Roo, El Salvador
- Lundellianthus harrimanii Strother - Nicaragua, Honduras
- Lundellianthus jaliscensis (McVaugh) Strother - Jalisco
- Lundellianthus kingii (H.Rob.) Strother - Guatemala
- Lundellianthus salvinii (Hemsl.) Strother - Guatemala, Honduras, Chiapas
- Lundellianthus steyermarkii (S.F.Blake) Strother - Guatemala
