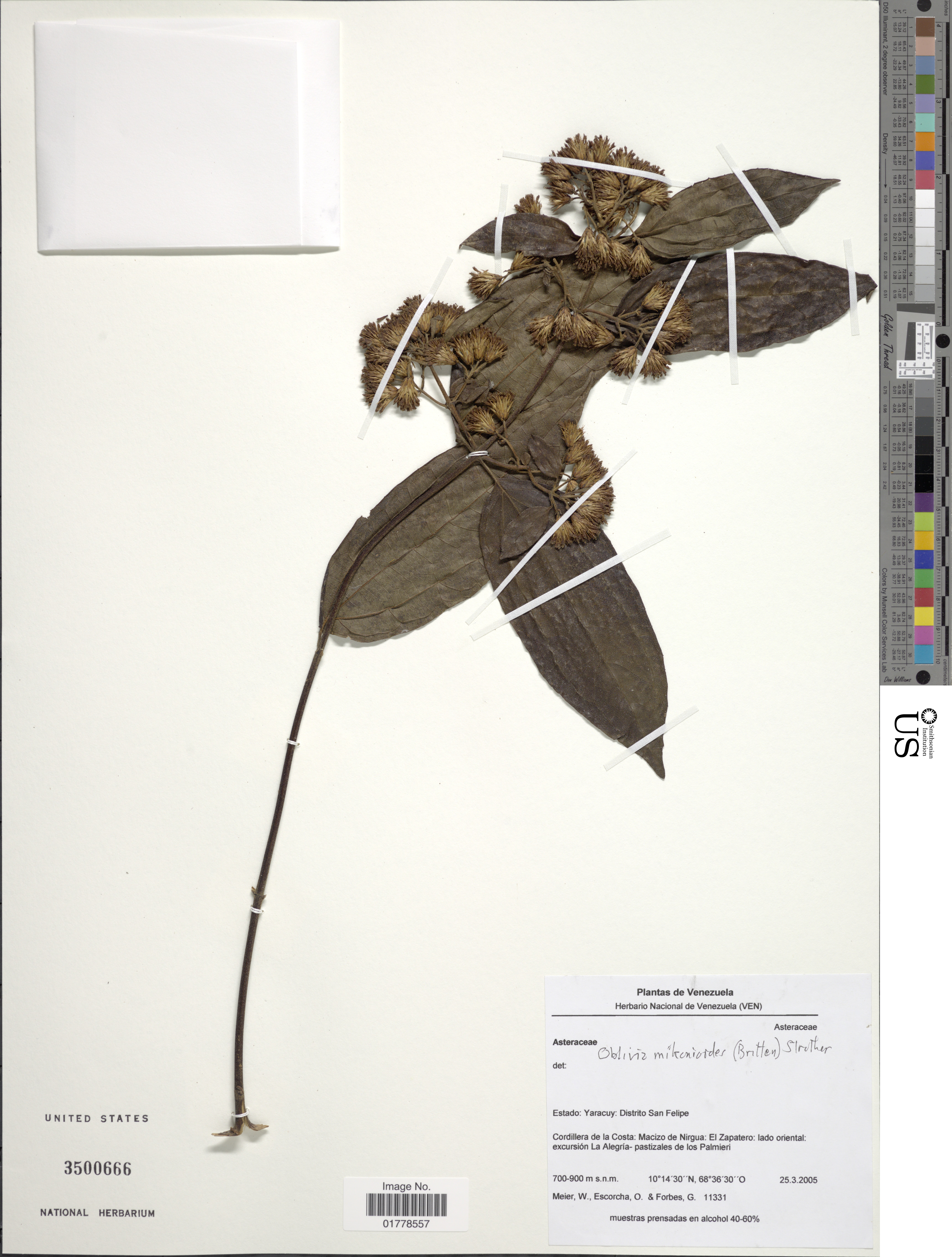

Scientific classification
- Kingdom: Plantae
- Clade: Embryophytes
- Clade: Tracheophytes
- Clade: Spermatophytes
- Clade: Angiosperms
- Clade: Eudicots
- Clade: Asterids
- Order: Asterales
- Family: Asteraceae
- Subfamily: Asteroideae
- Tribe: Heliantheae
- Subtribe: Ecliptinae
- Genus: Oblivia; Strother

Type species
- Salmea mikanioides Britt.

= Oblivia =

Genus of flowering plants

Oblivia is a genus of flowering plant in the tribe Heliantheae within the family Asteraceae.

Species

- Oblivia ceronii H.Rob. - Perú, Ecuador
- Oblivia mikanioides (Britt.) Strother - Bolivia, Perú, Ecuador, Colombia, Panamá, Venezuela
- Oblivia simplex (V.M.Badillo) H.Rob. - Venezuela
