= Sidney Fay Blake =

American botanist and plant taxonomist (1892-1959)

- Born: August 31, 1892; Stoughton, Massachusetts
- Died: December 31, 1959 (aged 67); Beltsville, Maryland
- Education: Harvard University
- Scientific career
- Fields: Botany
- Workplaces: United States Department of Agriculture
- Author abbrev. (botany): S.F.Blake

Sidney Fay Blake (1892–1959) was an American botanist and plant taxonomist, "recognized as one of the world's experts on botanical nomenclature."

== Early life and education ==
Blake was born in 1892 in Stoughton, Massachusetts. In 1912, he received a bachelor's degree from Harvard University, a master's degree in 1913, and a Ph.D. in botany in 1917 with a thesis on Viguiera.

== Career ==
The same year he received his Ph.D., he started his botanical career at the Bureau of Plant Industry for the United States Department of Agriculture, and worked there till he died in 1959. In 1943 he was elected president of the American Society of Plant Taxonomists. Blake published many articles and monographs but only one two-volume work, Geographical Guide to Floras of the World. The first volume, co-authored by Alice C. Atwood (1876–1947), was published in 1942. The second volume, written by Blake alone, was published in 1961 two years after his death.

His area was the Compositae. In 1956 he was named one of the 50 greatest living botanists in America by the Botanical Society of America. Blake contributed a treatment of the Polygalaceae to the original North American Flora. Additionally, Blake was a bibliographer. The "Geographical Guide to the Floras of the World," which he began with Alice C. Atwood, a librarian at the Department of Agriculture library, provides a reference to obscure and famous floras, both books and articles, arranged geographically.

He married the entomologist Doris M. Holmes in 1918. They had one daughter.

In 1930, botanist Standl. published Neoblakea, a genus of flowering plants from South America, belonging to the family Rubiaceae, with the name honouring Sidney Fay Blake. Then in 2011, botanists E.E.Schill. and Panero published Sidneya, which is a genus of flowering plants from Mexico and surrounds belonging to the family Asteraceae.
