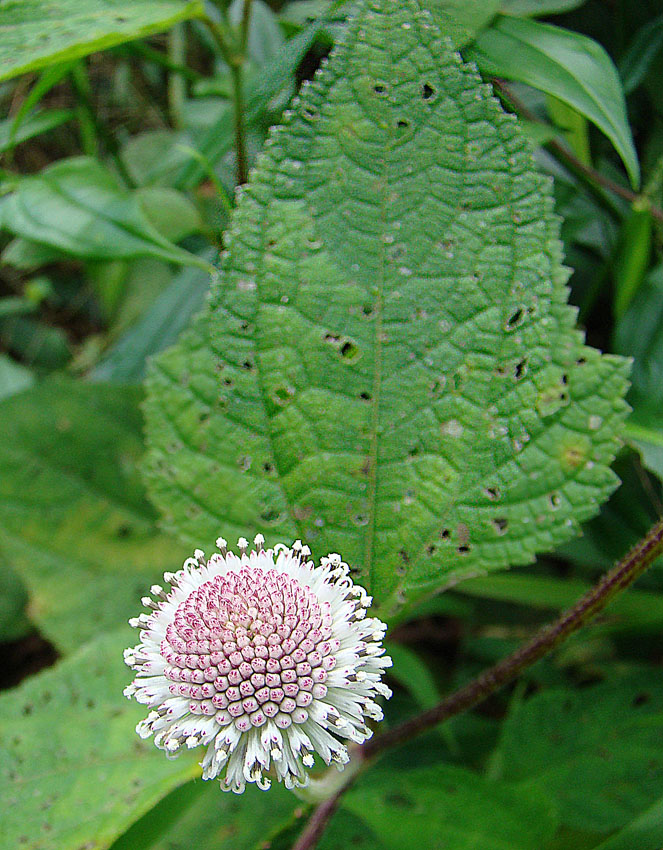
- Melanthera nivea

Scientific classification
- Kingdom: Plantae
- Clade: Embryophytes
- Clade: Tracheophytes
- Clade: Angiosperms
- Clade: Eudicots
- Clade: Asterids
- Order: Asterales
- Family: Asteraceae
- Subfamily: Asteroideae
- Tribe: Heliantheae
- Subtribe: Ecliptinae
- Genus: Melanthera; Rohr

Synonyms
- Echinocephalum Gardner; Melananthera Michx.

= Melanthera =

Genus of flowering plants

Melanthera (common name: squarestem), is a genus of perennial flowering plants in the family Asteraceae, native to the tropical and subtropical Americas.

Despite their general hardiness, leaves of Melanthera species are often attacked by rusts such as Uromyces columbianus and Uromyces martinii.

== Taxonomy ==
The classification of this genus was uncertain. At times it included species native North and South America, as well as Africa, Asia and Oceania, including Hawaiʻi. Further studies are needed to clarify its taxonomic and phylogenetic relationships.

The genus now includes three species native to the tropical Americas. Species formerly placed in genus Melanthera are now placed in Lipochaeta (Hawaiian species), Lipotriche (sub-Saharan African species), and Wollastonia (species from eastern Africa, tropical and subtropical Asia, Australia, and the Pacific).

== Species ==
Three species are currently accepted.

- Melanthera latifolia (Gardner) Cabrera - Brazil, Bolivia, Paraguay, Uruguay, and northern Argentina
- Melanthera nivea (L.) Small – Pineland Squarestem, Snow Squarestem, Yerba de Cabra; SE United States (LA MS AL GA FL SC TN KY IL), Caribbean, Mexico (from Tamaulipas to Quintana Roo), Central America, South America (Colombia, Venezuela, Guyana, northern Brazil, Ecuador, Peru, and Bolivia)
- Melanthera parvifolia Small – Small-leaf Squarestem - southern Florida

=== Unplaced names ===
- Melanthera cinerea Schweinf. - Africa

=== Formerly placed here ===
- Lipochaeta bryanii Sherff – Pili Nehe; Hawaiʻi (as Melanthera bryanii (Sherff) W.L.Wagner & H.Rob.)
- Lipochaeta fauriei H.Lév. – Olokele Canyon Nehe; Hawaiʻi (as Melanthera fauriei (H. Lév.) W.L.Wagner & H.Rob.)
- Lipochaeta integrifolia (Nutt.) A.Gray – Kure Atoll Nehe; Hawaiʻi (as Melanthera integrifolia (Nutt.) W.L.Wagner & H.Rob.)
- Lipochaeta kamolensis O.Deg. & Sherff – Maui Nehe; MauʻI (as Melanthera kamolensis (O.Deg.) & Sherff) W.L.Wagner & H.Rob.)
- Lipochaeta lavarum (Gaudich.) DC. – Coastal Nehe; Hawaiʻi. (as Melanthera lavarum (Gaudich.) W.L. Wagner & H.Rob.)
- Lipochaeta micrantha (Nutt.) A.Gray - Hawaiʻi (as Melanthera micrantha (Nutt.) W.L.Wagner & H.Rob.)
- Lipochaeta perdita Sherff – Koʻokoʻolau; Hawaiʻi (as Melanthera perdita (Sherff) W.L.Wagner & H.Rob.)
- Lipochaeta populifolia (Sherff) R.C.Gardner – Grassland Nehe; Hawaiʻi (as Melanthera populifolia (Sherff) W.L. Wagner & H.Rob.)
- Lipochaeta remyi A.Gray – Annual Nehe; Hawaiʻi (as Melanthera remyi (A.Gray) W.L.Wagner & H.Rob.)
- Lipochaeta subcordata A.Gray - Hawaiʻi (as Melanthera subcordata (A.Gray) W.L.Wagner & H.Rob.)
- Lipochaeta tenuis O.Deg. & Sherff – Streambed Nehe; Hawaiʻi (as Melanthera tenuis (O.Deg. & Sherff) W.L.Wagner & H.Rob.)
- Lipochaeta tenuifolia A.Gray – Waianae Range Nehe; Oʻahu (as Melanthera tenuifolia (A.Gray) W.L.Wagner & H.Rob.)
- Lipochaeta venosa Sherff – Spreading Nehe; Hawaiʻi (as Melanthera venosa (Sherff) W.L. Wagner & H.Rob.)
- Lipochaeta waimeaensis H.St.John – Waimea Canyon Nehe; KauaʻI (as Melanthera waimeaensis (H.St.John) W.L. Wagner & H.Rob.)
- Lipotriche abyssinica (Sch.Bip. ex A.Rich.) Orchard (as Melanthera abyssinica (Sch.Bip. ex A.Rich.) Benth. & Hook.f. ex Vatke, M. djalonensis A.Chev., and M. sokodensis Muschl. ex Hutch. & Dalziel)
- Lipotriche elliptica (O.Hoffm.) D.J.N.Hind (as Melanthera elliptica O.Hoffm. and M. chevalieri O.Hoffm. & Muschl.)
- Lipotriche felicis (C.D.Adams) D.J.N.Hind (as Melanthera felicis C.D.Adams)
- Lipotriche gambica (Hutch. & Dalziel) Orchard (as Melanthera gambica Hutch. & Dalziel)
- Lipotriche marlothiana (O.Hoffm.) D.J.N.Hind (as Melanthera marlothiana O.Hoffm.)
- Lipotriche pungens (Oliv. & Hiern) Orchard (as Melanthera pungens Oliv. & Hiern)
- Lipotriche rhombifolia (O.Hoffm. & Muschl.) D.J.N.Hind) (as Melanthera rhombifolia O.Hoffm. & Muschl.)
- Lipotriche richardsiae (Wild) D.J.N.Hind (as Melanthera richardsae Wild)
- Lipotriche robinsonii (Wild) D.J.N.Hind (as Melanthera robinsonii Wild)
- Lipotriche scaberrima (Hiern) D.J.N.Hind (as Melanthera scaberrima Hiern)
- Lipotriche scandens (Schumach. & Thonn.) Orchard (as Melanthera scandens (Schumach. & Thonn.) Brenan)
- Lipotriche tithonioides (Aké Assi) D.J.N.Hind (as Melanthera tithonioides Aké Assi)
- Lipotriche triternata (Klatt) Orchard (as Melanthera baumii O.Hoffm., M. monochaeta Hiern, M. schinziana S.Moore, M. triternata (Klatt) Wild, and M. varians Hiern)
- Wollastonia biflora (L.) DC. (as Melanthera biflora (L.) Wild.)
- Wollastonia dentata (H.Lév. & Vaniot) Orchard (as Melanthera prostrata (Hemsl.) W.L.Wagner & H.Rob., M. robusta (Makino) K.Ohashi & H.Ohashi, or M. taiwanensis S.S.Ying)
- Wollastonia lifuana (Hochr. (as Melanthera lifuana (Hochr.) W.L.Wagner & H.Rob.)
