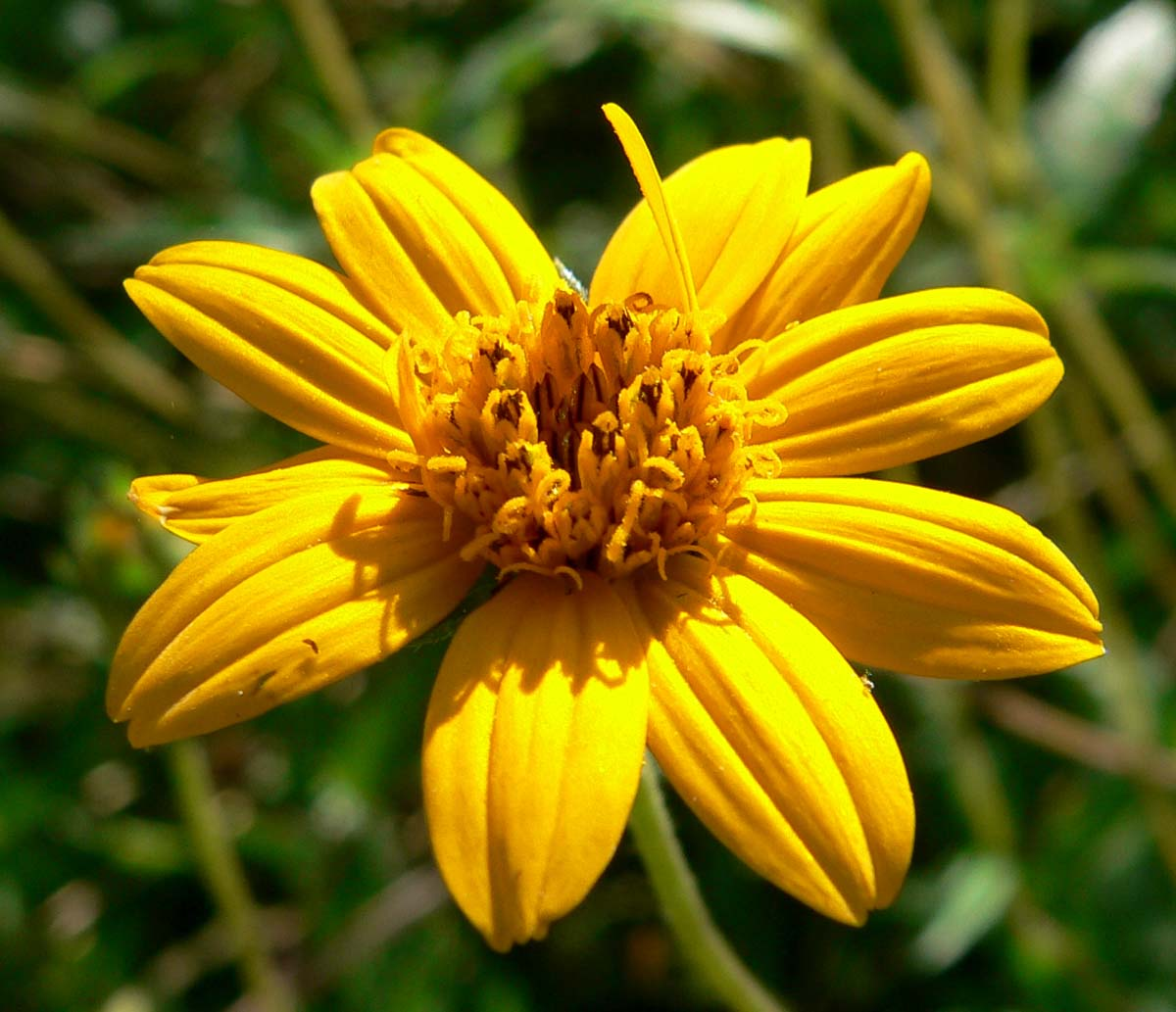
- Wedelia acapulcensis

Scientific classification
- Kingdom: Plantae
- Clade: Tracheophytes
- Clade: Angiosperms
- Clade: Eudicots
- Clade: Asterids
- Order: Asterales
- Family: Asteraceae
- Subfamily: Asteroideae
- Tribe: Heliantheae
- Subtribe: Ecliptinae
- Genus: Wedelia; Jacq. 1760, conserved name, not Loefl. 1758 (Nyctaginaceae)

Type species
- Wedelia fructicosa Jacq.

Synonyms
- Anomostephium DC.; Trichostephus Cass.; Aspilia Thouars; Anthemiopsis Bojer ex DC.; Seruneum Rumph. ex Kuntze; Dipterotheca Sch.Bip. ex Hochst.; Dipterotheca Sch.Bip.; Wedelia sect. Cyathophora DC.; Thelechitonia Cuatrec.; Niebuhria Neck. ex Britton; Trichostemma Cass.; Niebuhria Neck. ex Britten; Wirtgenia Sch.Bip.; Trichostephium Cass.; Stemmodontia Cass.; Coronocarpus Schumach. & Thonn.; Menotriche Steetz; Niebuhria Neck.; Gymnolomia Kunth; Harpephora Endl.

= Wedelia =

Genus of flowering plants

Wedelia is a genus of flowering plants in the family Asteraceae. They are one of the genera commonly called "creeping-oxeyes".

The genus is named in honor of German botanist and physician Georg Wolfgang Wedel, 1645–1721.

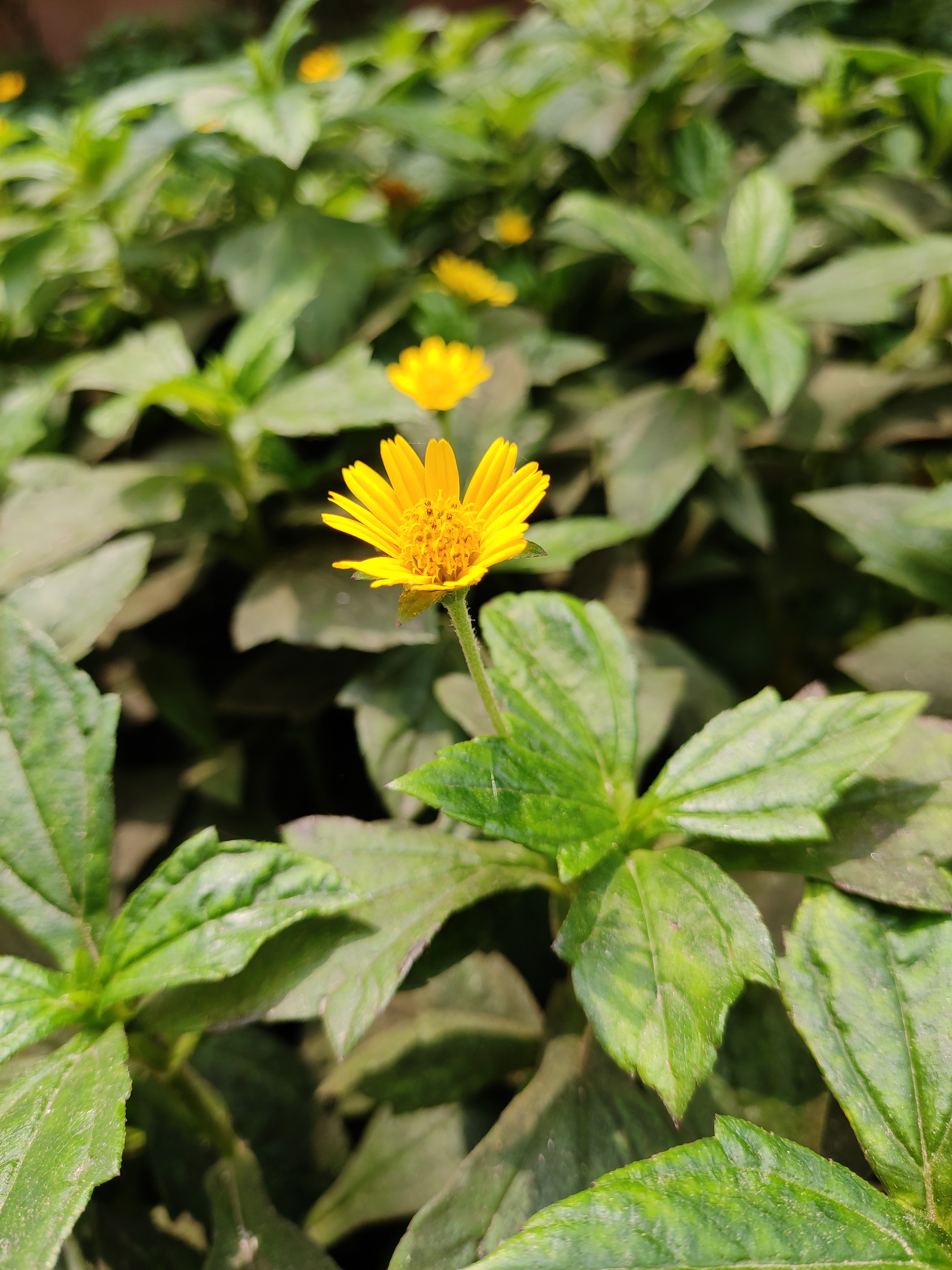
Wedelia in Noida, near New Delhi

== Taxonomy ==
There are difficulties regarding the classification of this genus for its affinities are uncertain. Further studies are needed to clarify its taxonomic and phylogenetic relationships.

Many species were once considered part of Wedelia but have been now transferred to other genera, including Angelphytum, Aspilia, Baltimora, Blainvillea, Chrysogonum, Eclipta, Elaphandra, Eleutheranthera, Guizotia, Heliopsis, Kingianthus, Lasianthaea, Melampodium, Melanthera, Moonia, Sphagneticola, Synedrella, Tuberculocarpus, Verbesina, Viguiera, Villanova, Wollastonia and Zexmenia.

== Species list ==
Species accepted by Plants of the World Online as of December 2022:

- Wedelia acapulcensis Kunth
- Wedelia aggregata (Greenm.) B.L.Turner
- Wedelia alagoensis Baker
- Wedelia almedae H.Rob.
- Wedelia ambigens S.F.Blake
- Wedelia andersonii (H.Rob.) B.L.Turner
- Wedelia angustifolia (Gardner) B.L.Turner
- Wedelia asperrima (Gardner) B.L.Turner
- Wedelia attenuata (Gardner) B.L.Turner
- Wedelia aurantiaca (Griseb.) B.L.Turner
- Wedelia avilensis (Aristeg. & Steyerm.) B.L.Turner
- Wedelia ayerscottiana B.L.Turner
- Wedelia bahamensis O.E.Schulz
- Wedelia bahiensis H.Rob.
- Wedelia baorucana Alain
- Wedelia bishopii H.Rob.
- Wedelia bishoplecta (H.Rob.) B.L.Turner
- Wedelia bonplandiana (Gardner) B.L.Turner
- Wedelia cachimboensis (H.Rob.) B.L.Turner
- Wedelia caleoides Aristeg.
- Wedelia calycina Rich.
- Wedelia camporum (Chodat) B.L.Turner
- Wedelia cardenasii (H.Rob.) B.L.Turner
- Wedelia chihuahuana B.L.Turner
- Wedelia cordiformis McVaugh
- Wedelia cronquistii B.L.Turner
- Wedelia cylindrocephala (H.Rob.) B.L.Turner
- Wedelia diffusiflora (H.Rob.) B.L.Turner
- Wedelia ehrenbergii Less.
- Wedelia elata (Pilg.) B.L.Turner
- Wedelia elliptica (DC.) B.L.Turner
- Wedelia elottiana B.L.Turner
- Wedelia episcopalis H.Rob.
- Wedelia filipes Hemsl.
- Wedelia floribunda (Gardner) B.L.Turner
- Wedelia foliacea (Spreng.) B.L.Turner
- Wedelia forbesii S.Moore
- Wedelia frioana B.L.Turner
- Wedelia frustrata B.L.Turner
- Wedelia fruticosa Jacq.
- Wedelia gardneri B.L.Turner
- Wedelia gaudichaudii DC.
- Wedelia gentryi B.L.Turner
- Wedelia gonzaleziarum B.L.Turner
- Wedelia goyazensis Gardner
- Wedelia grandiflora Benth.
- Wedelia grayi McVaugh
- Wedelia greenmanii B.L.Turner
- Wedelia hassleriana (Chodat) B.L.Turner
- Wedelia hatschbachii H.Rob.
- Wedelia helianthoides Kunth
- Wedelia heringeri H.Rob.
- Wedelia heringeriana (H.Rob.) B.L.Turner
- Wedelia hintoniorum B.L.Turner
- Wedelia hispidula (Baker) J.U.Santos
- Wedelia hoffmanniana Bruns
- Wedelia holwayi S.F.Blake
- Wedelia homogama V.R.Bueno & J.N.Nakaj.
- Wedelia hookeriana Gardner
- Wedelia iners (S.F.Blake) Strother
- Wedelia isolepis S.F.Blake
- Wedelia jugata (H.Rob.) B.L.Turner
- Wedelia juxtlahuacana B.L.Turner
- Wedelia keilii B.L.Turner
- Wedelia kerrii N.E.Br.
- Wedelia kirkbridei H.Rob.
- Wedelia laevissima (Baker) B.L.Turner
- Wedelia lanceolata DC.
- Wedelia leucanthema (Chodat) B.L.Turner
- Wedelia leucoglossa (Malme) B.L.Turner
- Wedelia ligulifolia (Standl. & L.O.Williams) Strother
- Wedelia longifolia Mart. ex Baker
- Wedelia loxensis H.Rob.
- Wedelia lundii DC.
- Wedelia macedoi H.Rob.
- Wedelia macrodonta DC.
- Wedelia martii (Baker) B.L.Turner
- Wedelia mexicana (Sch.Bip.) McVaugh
- Wedelia modesta Baker
- Wedelia montevidensis (Spreng.) B.L.Turner
- Wedelia oligocephala Baker
- Wedelia ovalifolia (DC.) B.L.Turner
- Wedelia oxylepis S.F.Blake
- Wedelia pallida Gardner
- Wedelia pascalioides (Griseb.) B.L.Turner
- Wedelia pauciflora V.R.Bueno, S.C.Ferreira & J.N.Nakaj.
- Wedelia penninervia S.F.Blake
- Wedelia pertenuis H.Rob.
- Wedelia phyllostachya (Baker) B.L.Turner
- Wedelia pimana B.L.Turner
- Wedelia podophylla (Baker) B.L.Turner
- Wedelia procumbens (Baker) B.L.Turner
- Wedelia pseudoyedaea (H.Rob.) B.L.Turner
- Wedelia puberula DC.
- Wedelia purpurea (Greenm.) B.L.Turner
- Wedelia ramagii (Ridl.) J.U.Santos
- Wedelia reflexa (Baker) B.L.Turner
- Wedelia regis H.Rob.
- Wedelia reticulata DC.
- Wedelia riedelii (Baker) B.L.Turner
- Wedelia rosei (Greenm.) McVaugh
- Wedelia rudis (Baker) H.Rob.
- Wedelia rugosa Greenm.
- Wedelia saltensis Cabrera
- Wedelia serrata Rich.
- Wedelia serrulata (Baker) B.L.Turner
- Wedelia silphioides (Hook. & Arn.) B.L.Turner
- Wedelia simpsoniae (H.Rob.) B.L.Turner
- Wedelia simsioides McVaugh
- Wedelia souzae H.Rob.
- Wedelia squarrosa (Baker) B.L.Turner
- Wedelia strigosa Hook. & Arn.
- Wedelia stuebelii Hieron.
- Wedelia subalpestris (Baker) J.U.Santos
- Wedelia subpetiolata (Baker) B.L.Turner
- Wedelia subvelutina DC.
- Wedelia symmetrica Rusby
- Wedelia talpana B.L.Turner
- Wedelia tambilloana B.L.Turner
- Wedelia tehuantepecana B.L.Turner
- Wedelia tenuifolia V.R.Bueno & J.N.Nakaj.
- Wedelia tomentosa (Baker) B.L.Turner
- Wedelia trichostephia DC.
- Wedelia urbanii O.E.Schulz
- Wedelia vauthieri DC.
- Wedelia veadeirosensis H.Rob.
- Wedelia vexata Strother
- Wedelia vieirae (H.Rob.) B.L.Turner
- Wedelia villosa Gardner
- Wedelia warmingii (Baker) B.L.Turner
- Wedelia xylopoda (Greenm.) B.L.Turner
- Wedelia zuliana S.Jiménez
