= Aspilia elegans =

Aspilia elegans may refer to:

- Aspilia elegans (C.D.Adams) J.-P.Lebrun & A.Stork, a synonym of Aspilia lisowskiana D.J.N.Hind
- Aspilia elegans Benth. & Hook.f. ex B.D.Jacks., a synonym of Wedelia foliacea (Spreng.) B.L.Turner
