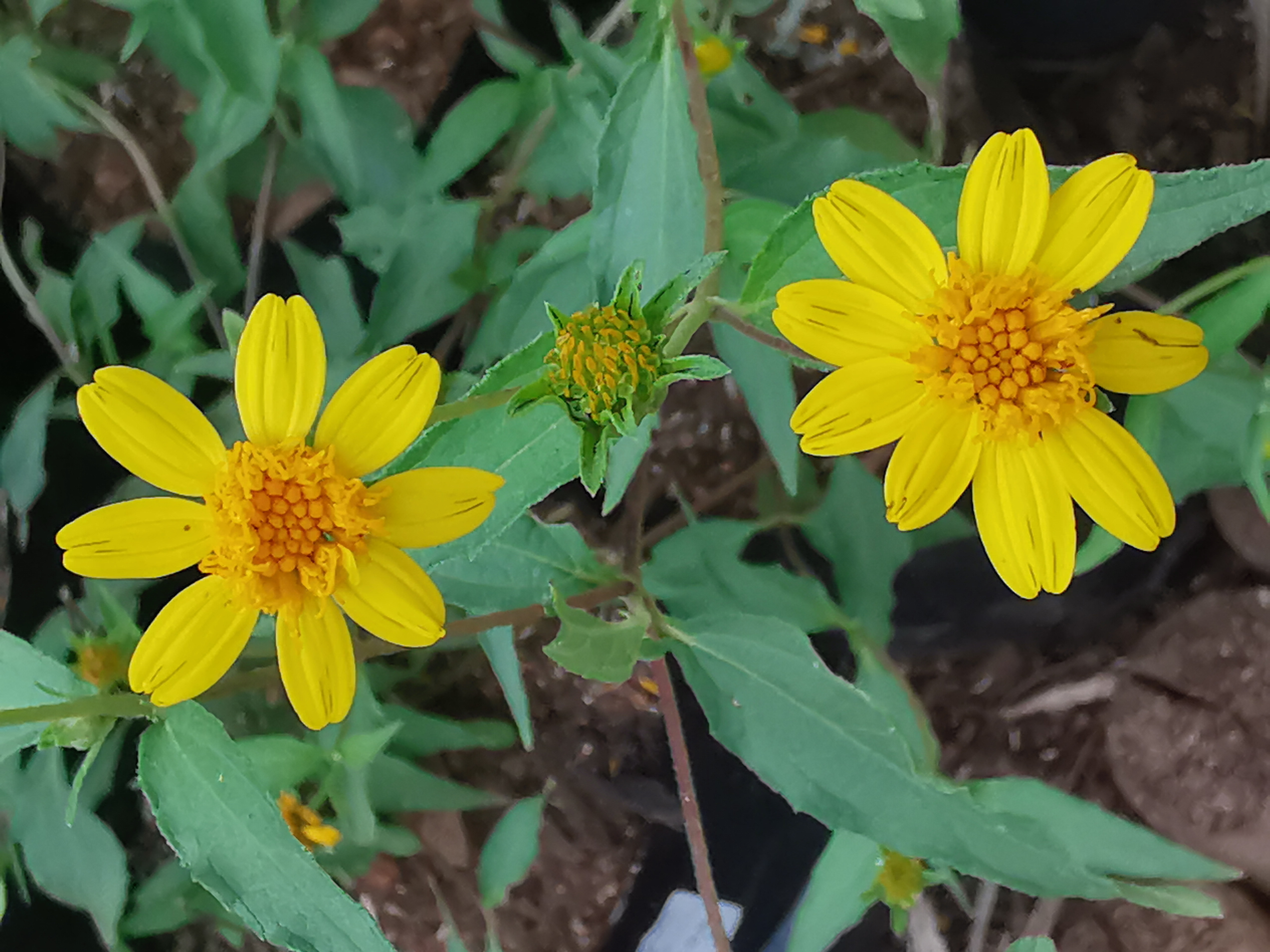

Scientific classification
- Kingdom: Plantae
- Clade: Tracheophytes
- Clade: Angiosperms
- Clade: Eudicots
- Clade: Asterids
- Order: Asterales
- Family: Asteraceae
- Genus: Aspilia
- Species: A. mossambicensis

Binomial name
- Aspilia mossambicensis (Oliv.) Wild

= Aspilia mossambicensis =

Wild sunflower

Species of flowering plant

Aspilia mossambicensis, also known as wild sunflower, is a medicinally useful herbaceous plant of the family Compositae (Asteraceae). It is widespread with an anthropogenic distribution in central and Eastern tropical Africa from Ethiopia, through East Africa, the Congo, Zambia, Zimbabwe, Malawi, Mozambique and South Africa.

Herb or shrub 0.5–1 m or straggling bush to 2.5 m high; branches scabrid. Leaves sessile to shortly petiolate, ovate or elliptic, 2–12´1–3 cm, base cuneate, margins entire or serrate, apex acute or attenuate, scabrid on both surfaces, somewhat 3‑nerved from base; petiole up to 1 cm long. Capitula in loose paniculate corymbs, on stalks to 7 cm long; involucre 4–7 mm high; outer phyllaries yellowish near base, green near apex, hispid‑pubescent; paleae 5–7 mm long, keeled with a dark midrib. Ray florets 8–13, bright yellow, rays 6–20 mm long, glabrous or pubescent above; disk florets yellow, 5–6.5 mm long, often with dark stripes along the tube. Achenes brown, obovoid, 4–5 mm long, pilose; pappus of several connate scales to 0.4 mm long and 1–2 barbellate aristae 1–3 mm long.

— Flora Somalia, (2000) - H. Beentje

A. mossambicensis is used by herbalists and local people to treat such ailments and conditions as malaria, bacterial infection and human immunodeficiency virus (HIV). It is also used to reduce menstrual cramps as well as a uterotonic able to induce uterine contraction and labour in confinements. This species is used together with the Neem tree to control the breeding cycles of Nile tilapia, Oreochromis niloticus. Drugs extracted from the two species inhibit early maturing and reproduction of the fish, countering problems raised by having populations of diverse ages in commercial breeding ponds.

== Phytochemical and anti-microbial properties ==
Two powerful stimulators of uterine contraction, the diterpenes kaurenoic and grandiflorenic acids, were found in the leaves of Aspilia mossambicensis. This lends credence to the idea that wild chimpanzees consume leaves of Aspilia species because of their pharmacological properties and could shed light on female chimpanzees' consuming such leaves more frequently than do males. Substantial amounts of thiarubrines, antifungal and nematocidal dithianes, were found in roots of plants growing throughout chimpanzee habitats.
