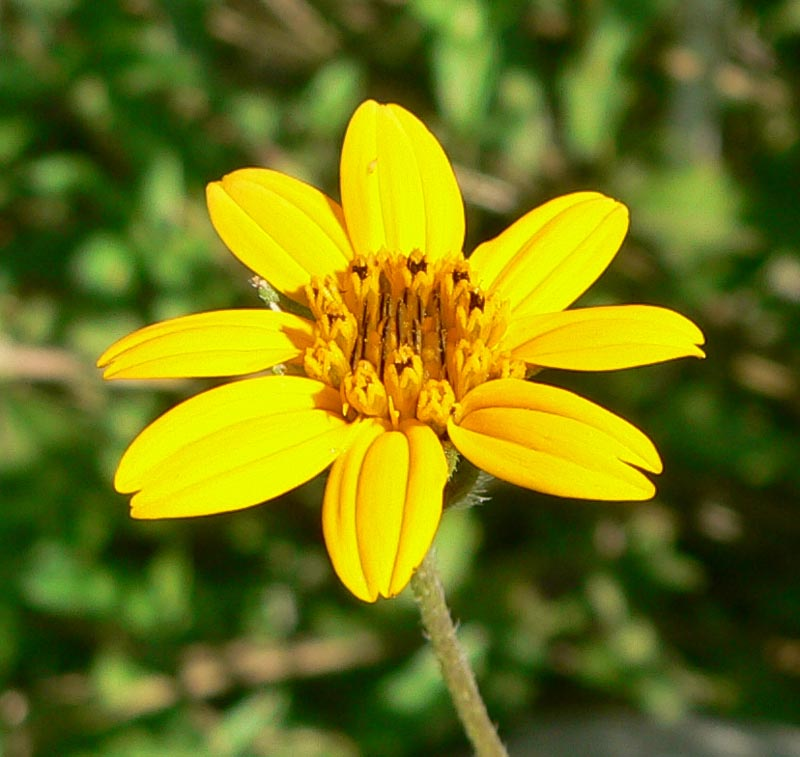
- Wedelia acapulcensis var. hispida

Scientific classification
- Kingdom: Plantae
- Clade: Tracheophytes
- Clade: Angiosperms
- Clade: Eudicots
- Clade: Asterids
- Order: Asterales
- Family: Asteraceae
- Tribe: Heliantheae
- Genus: Wedelia
- Species: W. acapulcensis

Binomial name
- Wedelia acapulcensis Kunth

Varieties
- Wedelia acapulcensis var. acapulcensis Wedelia acapulcensis var. hispida

Synonyms
- Anthemis hondensis Willd. ex Steud.; Seruneum acapulcense (Kunth) Kuntze; Seruneum acapulcensis (Kunth) Kuntze; Wedelia adhaerens S.F.Blake; Wedelia pinetorum (Standl. & Steyerm.) K.M.Becker; Zexmenia epapposa M.E.Jones; Zexmenia longipes Benth.; Zexmenia pinetorum Standl. & Steyerm.

= Wedelia acapulcensis =

Species of flowering plant

Wedelia acapulcensis, commonly known as Acapulco wedelia, is a species of flowering plant in the family Asteraceae. It is native to Texas in the United States, Mexico, and Central America.

== Varieties ==
- Wedelia acapulcensis var. acapulcensis
- Wedelia acapulcensis var. hispida (Kunth) Strother (=Lipochaeta texana Torr. & A.Gray, W. hispida Kunth, W. texana (A.Gray) B.L.Turner, Zexmenia hispida (Kunth) A.Gray ex Small) – hairy wedelia, orange wedelia, orange zexmenia

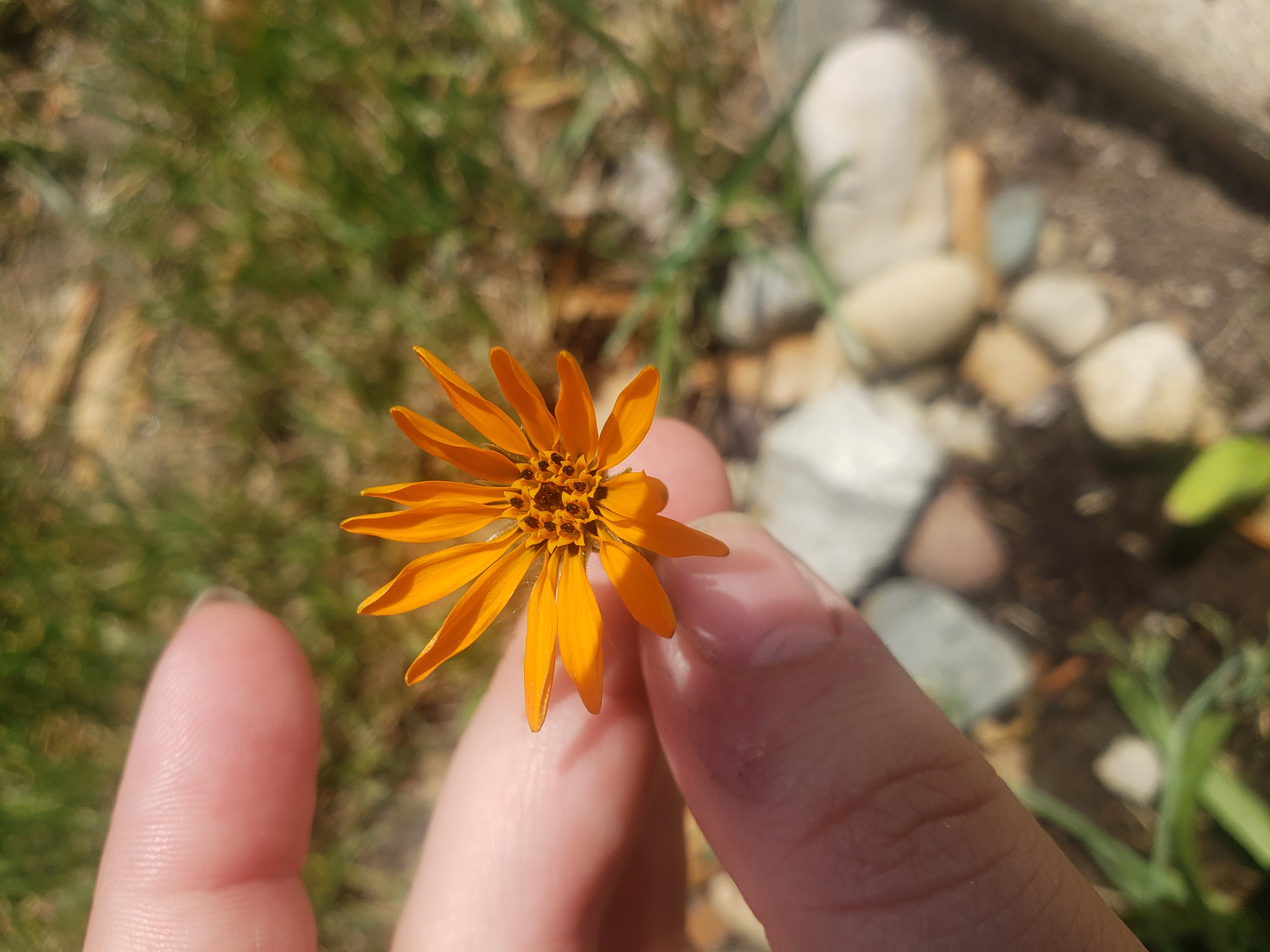
Orange wedelia
