= Chrysogonum perrieri =

Scientific classification
- Kingdom: Plantae
- Clade: Tracheophytes
- Clade: Angiosperms
- Clade: Eudicots
- Clade: Asterids
- Order: Asterales
- Family: Asteraceae
- Genus: Chrysogonum
- Species: C. perrieri

Binomial name
- Chrysogonum perrieri (Humbert) Humbert

Synonyms
- Wedelia perrieri Humbert

Species of flowering plant

Chrysogonum perrieri is a species of plants in the family Asteraceae. It is found only in Madagascar.
