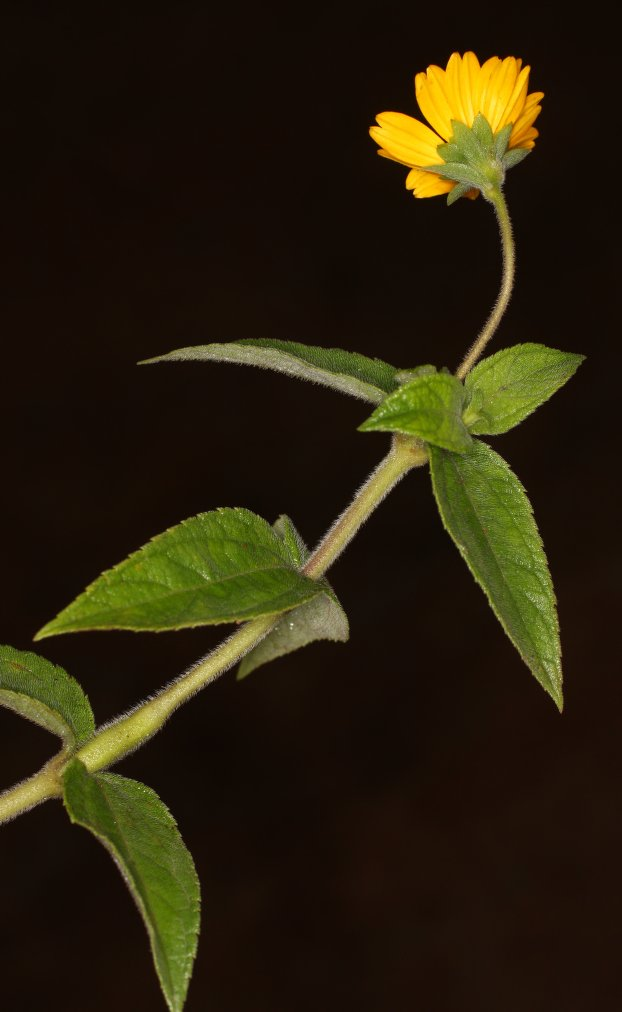

Scientific classification
- Kingdom: Plantae
- Clade: Embryophytes
- Clade: Tracheophytes
- Clade: Angiosperms
- Clade: Eudicots
- Clade: Asterids
- Order: Asterales
- Family: Asteraceae
- Tribe: Heliantheae
- Genus: Aspilia
- Species: A. africana

Binomial name
- Aspilia africana (Pers.) C.D.Adams

= Aspilia africana =

Haemorrhage plant

Species of flowering plant

Aspilia africana, also known as the haemorrhage plant or wild sunflower, is one of about 50 species of the genus Aspilia.

== Description ==
Aspilia africana is a semi-woody herb from a perennial woody root-stock to 25–130 cm high. Leaves are 4–12 cm long and lanceolate. The fruit are 3–3.5mm long achenes.

It is very polymorphic with at least four varieties recognized.

== Distribution and habitat ==
It is widely distributed across tropical Africa, occurring on grasslands, woodlands, forest margins, and abandoned cultivated zones.

== Traditional medicine ==
Aspilia africana has been classified as a low toxicity plant and has been used in traditional African medicine to treat wounds. Its leaves are taken as an infusion by women after childbirth.
