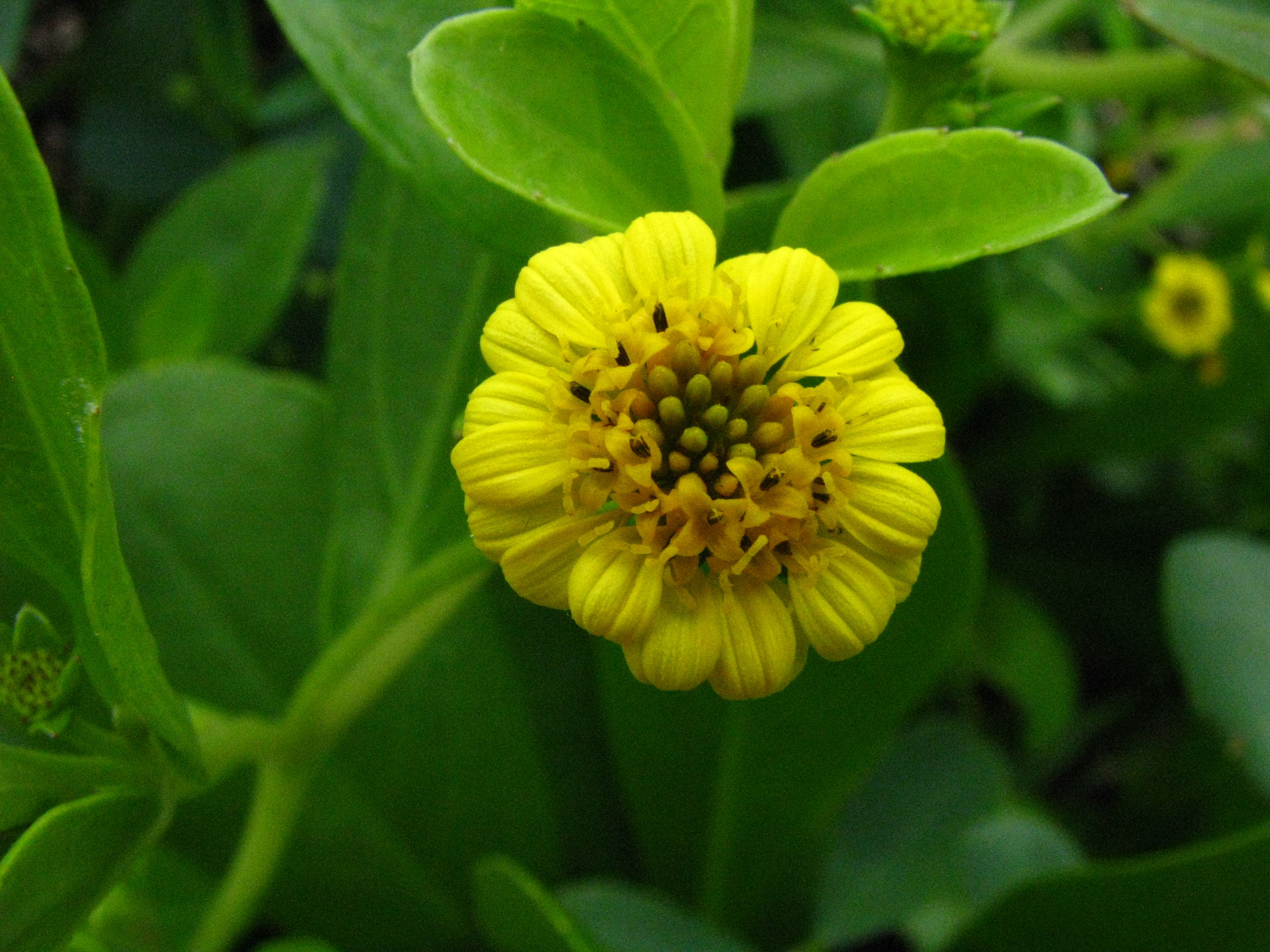

Scientific classification
- Kingdom: Plantae
- Clade: Tracheophytes
- Clade: Angiosperms
- Clade: Eudicots
- Clade: Asterids
- Order: Asterales
- Family: Asteraceae
- Genus: Lipochaeta
- Species: L. succulenta

Binomial name
- Lipochaeta succulenta (Hook. & Arn.) DC.

= Lipochaeta succulenta =

Species of flowering plant

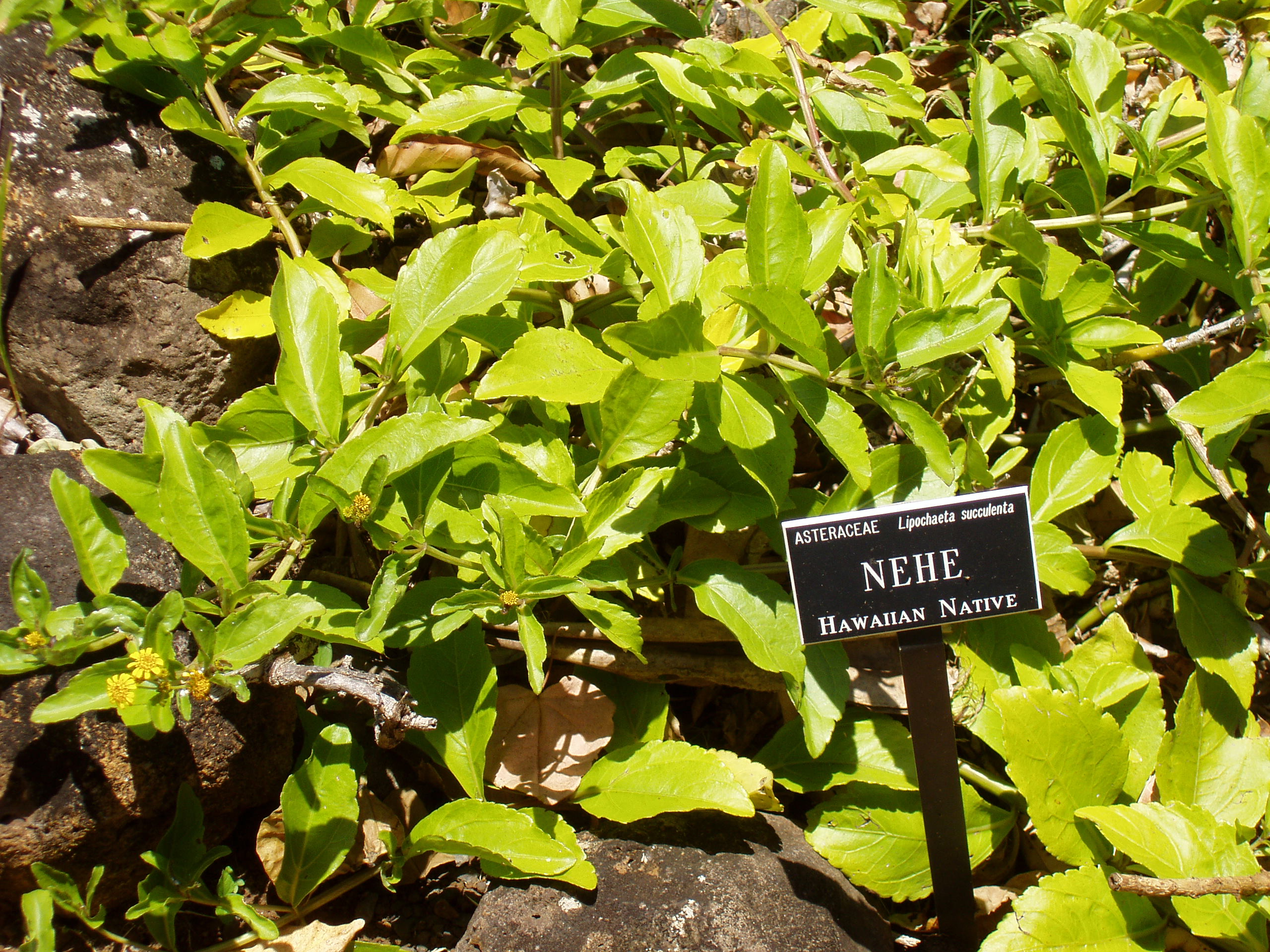
L. succulenta growing in Limahuli Garden and Preserve

Lipochaeta succulenta, the seaside nehe, is a plant endemic to all the main Hawaiian islands except Lanai.

Lipochaeta succulenta is a perennial, clump-forming subshrub up to 3–4 ft (0.91–1.22 m) tall with lax, spreading stems that root at the nodes. Leaves are glossy green, succulent, and 2–5 in (5.1–12.7 cm) long. It is restricted to coastal areas below 300 ft (91 m) elevation, and common in beach areas along the Nā Pali coast of Kauai.
