= Quadribractea =

Scientific classification
- Kingdom: Plantae
- Clade: Embryophytes
- Clade: Tracheophytes
- Clade: Angiosperms
- Clade: Eudicots
- Clade: Asterids
- Order: Asterales
- Family: Asteraceae
- Subfamily: Asteroideae
- Tribe: Heliantheae
- Subtribe: Ecliptinae
- Genus: Quadribractea; Orchard
- Species: Q. moluccana

Binomial name
- Quadribractea moluccana (Blume) Orchard

Genus of flowering plants

Quadribractea is a genus of flowering plant in the family Asteraceae. It has only one currently accepted species, Quadribractea moluccana, native to the Maluku Islands and New Guinea. It has an affinity with but is probably not a member of the Melanthera alliance.
