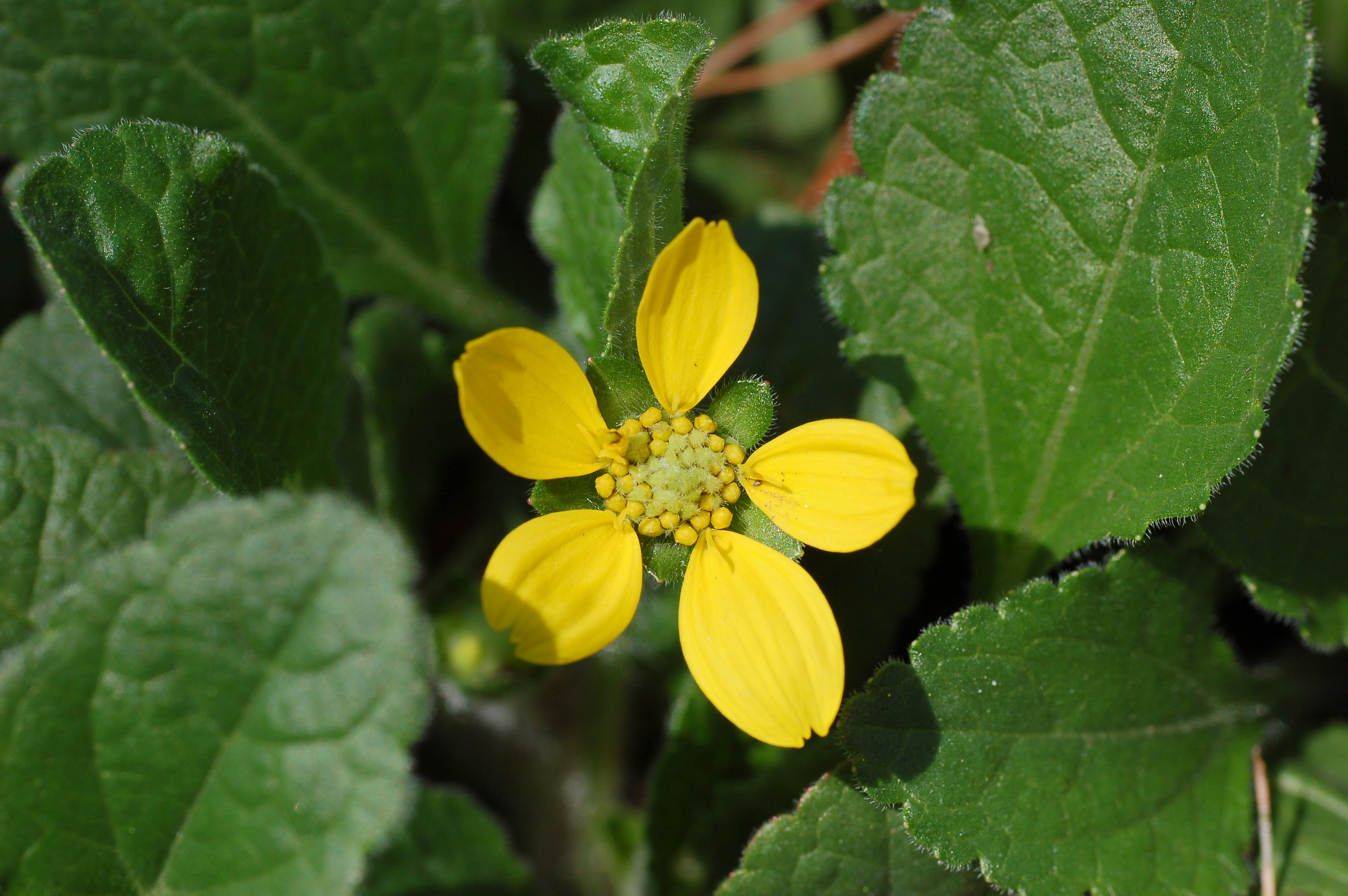
- Chrysogonum virginianum

Scientific classification
- Kingdom: Plantae
- Clade: Tracheophytes
- Clade: Angiosperms
- Clade: Eudicots
- Clade: Asterids
- Order: Asterales
- Family: Asteraceae
- Subfamily: Asteroideae
- Tribe: Heliantheae
- Subtribe: Engelmanniinae
- Genus: Chrysogonum; L.

Type species
- Chrysogonum virginianum L.

Synonyms
- Cargilla Adans.; Diotostephus Cass.

= Chrysogonum =

Genus of flowering plants

Chrysogonum is a genus of flowering plants in the family Asteraceae. As of May 2024, two circumscriptions of the genus were in use. In the broader circumscription, the genus has a discontinuous distribution, with species native to eastern North America and Madagascar. In the narrower circumscription, the genus contains only species native to eastern North America.

== Description ==
The plants are low-growing terrestrial herbs with yellow flower heads containing both disc and ray florets. The genus is distinctive in having pistillate ray florets and staminate disk florets, and the pistil of the ray floret is fused to the adjacent phyllary as well as three paleae and their associated disk florets to form a "cypsela complex".

== Taxonomy ==
The genus Chrysogonum was erected by Carl Linnaeus in 1753 for the North American species Chrysogonum virginianum. Seven species were accepted by Plants of the World Online as of May 2024: two further North American species, and four Madagascan species added by Jean-Henri Humbert starting in 1958. In 1977, a review of the genus reduced it to a single North American species with two varieties. A similar treatment was proposed by Nesom in 2001, although with three varieties. In 2020, Nesom accepted one of the varieties as a separate species, Chrysogonum repens.

=== Species ===
If the genus is regarded as confined to North America, there are potentially three species:

- Chrysogonum australe Alexander ex Small, syn. Chrysogonum virginianum var. australe (Alexander ex Small) H.E.Ahles
- Chrysogonum repens (Cass.) G.L.Nesom, syn. Chrysogonum virginianum var. brevistolon G.L.Nesom
- Chrysogonum virginianum L.

If the genus also occurs in Madagascar, there are potentially four more species, which may alternatively be placed in the genus Aspilia:

- Chrysogonum leandrii Humbert, syn. Aspilia leandrii (Humbert)
- Chrysogonum madagascariense Humbert, syn. Aspilia madagascariensis (Humbert)
- Chrysogonum perrieri (Humbert) Humbert, syn. Aspilia perrieri Humbert
- Chrysogonum stenocephalum Humbert, syn. Aspilia stenocephala (Humbert)

=== Former species ===
- Chrysogonum trichodesmoides (F.Muell.) F.Muell. = Pentalepis trichodesmoides F.Muell.

== Uses ==
Chrysogonum virginianum is grown as an ornamental plant under the common name of green and gold, and is used primarily as a ground cover.
