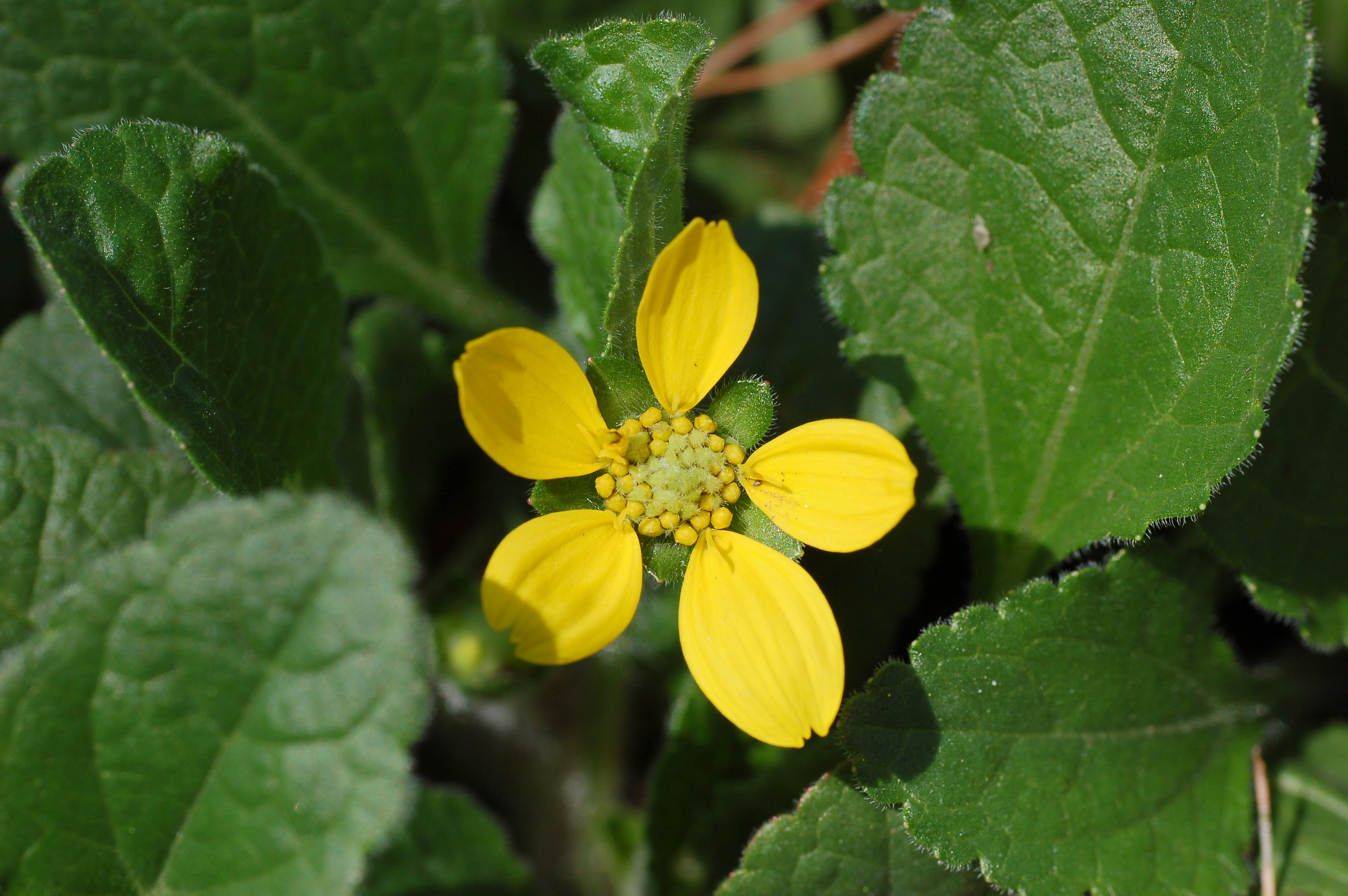

Scientific classification
- Kingdom: Plantae
- Clade: Tracheophytes
- Clade: Angiosperms
- Clade: Eudicots
- Clade: Asterids
- Order: Asterales
- Family: Asteraceae
- Tribe: Heliantheae
- Genus: Chrysogonum
- Species: C. virginianum

Binomial name
- Chrysogonum virginianum L.

Synonyms
- Chrysogonum australe Alexander ex Small, syn of var. australe; Diotostephus repens Cass., syn of var. brevistolon

= Chrysogonum virginianum =

Species of flowering plant

Chrysogonum virginianum, the golden-knee, green and gold, or goldenstar, is a North American species of plants in the family Asteraceae. It is native to the eastern United States from New York State and Rhode Island south to Louisiana and the Florida Panhandle.

The species is sometimes grown as a perennial ornamental because of its showy flowers. It is usually propagated by root cuttings.

Varieties

Formal botanical varieties of wild populations:

- Chrysogonum virginianum var. australe (Alexander ex Small) H.E.Ahles - Florida, Georgia, Alabama, Mississippi, Louisiana
- Chrysogonum virginianum var. brevistolon G.L.Nesom - Georgia, Alabama, Carolinas, Tennessee, Kentucky
- Chrysogonum virginianum var. virginianum - from New York to South Carolina, west to Kentucky + Ohio

Chrysogonum virginianum is an herb up to 50 cm (20 inches) spreading by means of rhizomes. Flower heads are produced singly or in pairs, yellow, with both ray florets and disc florets.

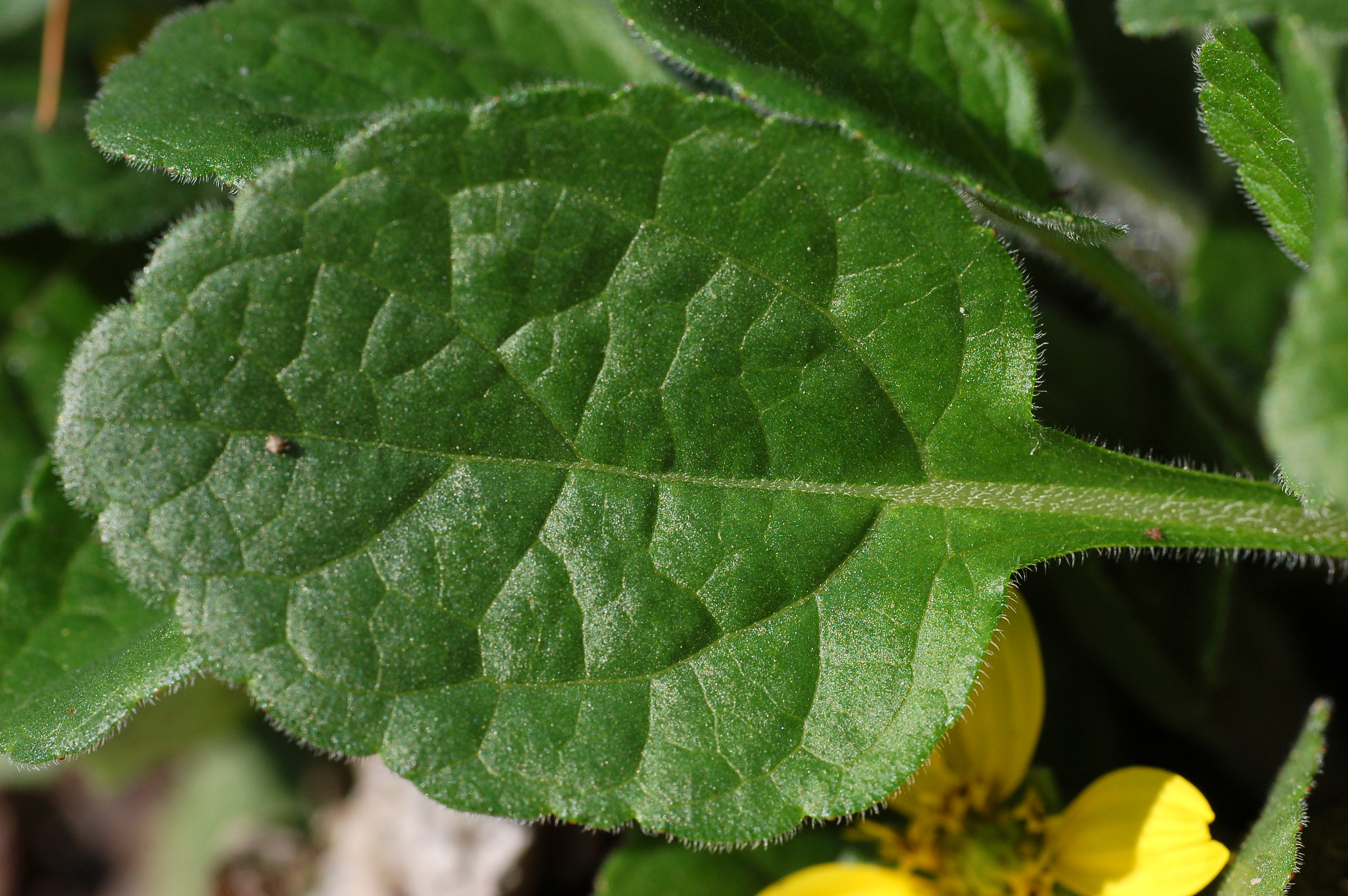
Leaf closeup

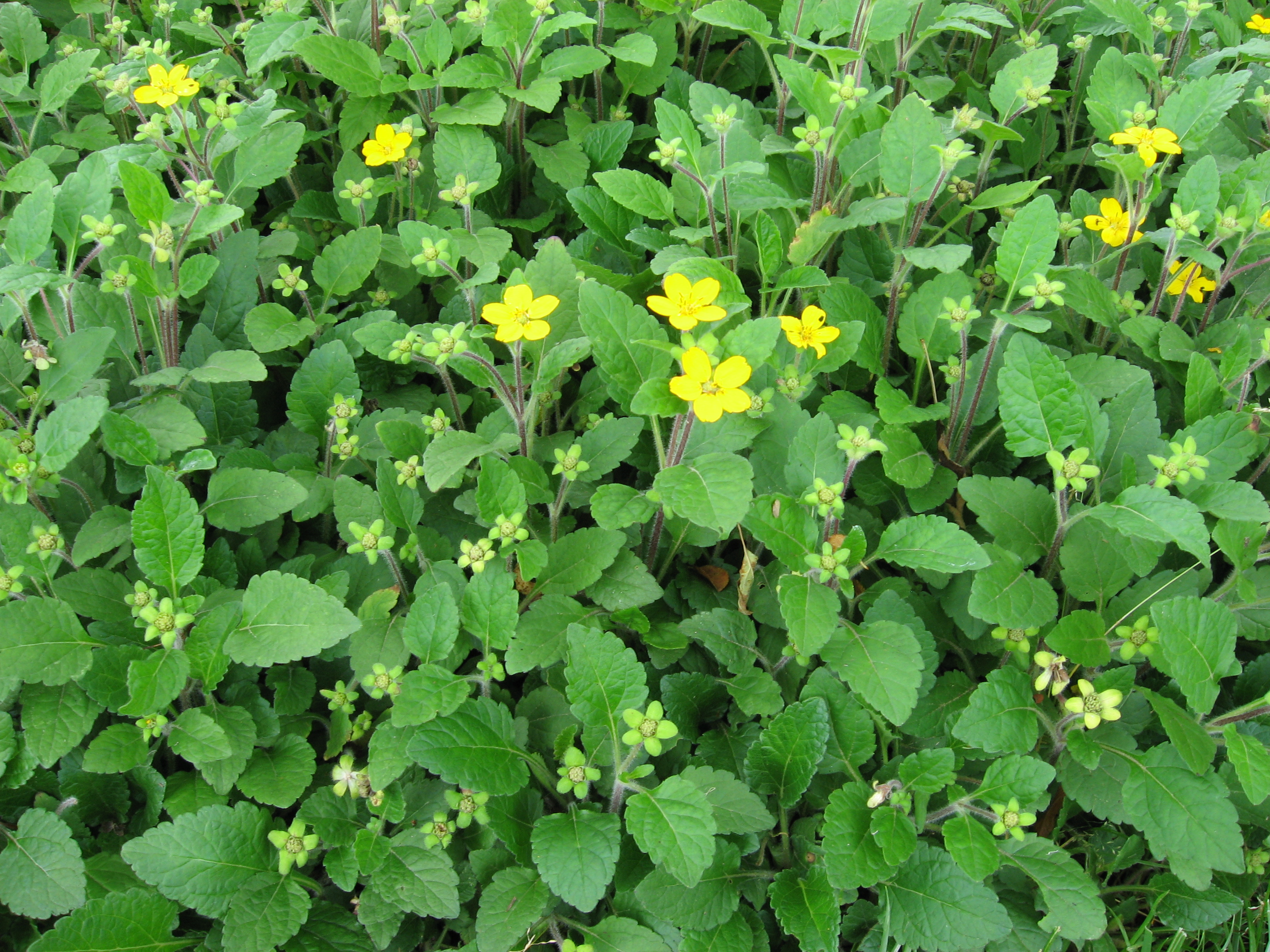
A picture of Chrysogonum virginianum var. australe
