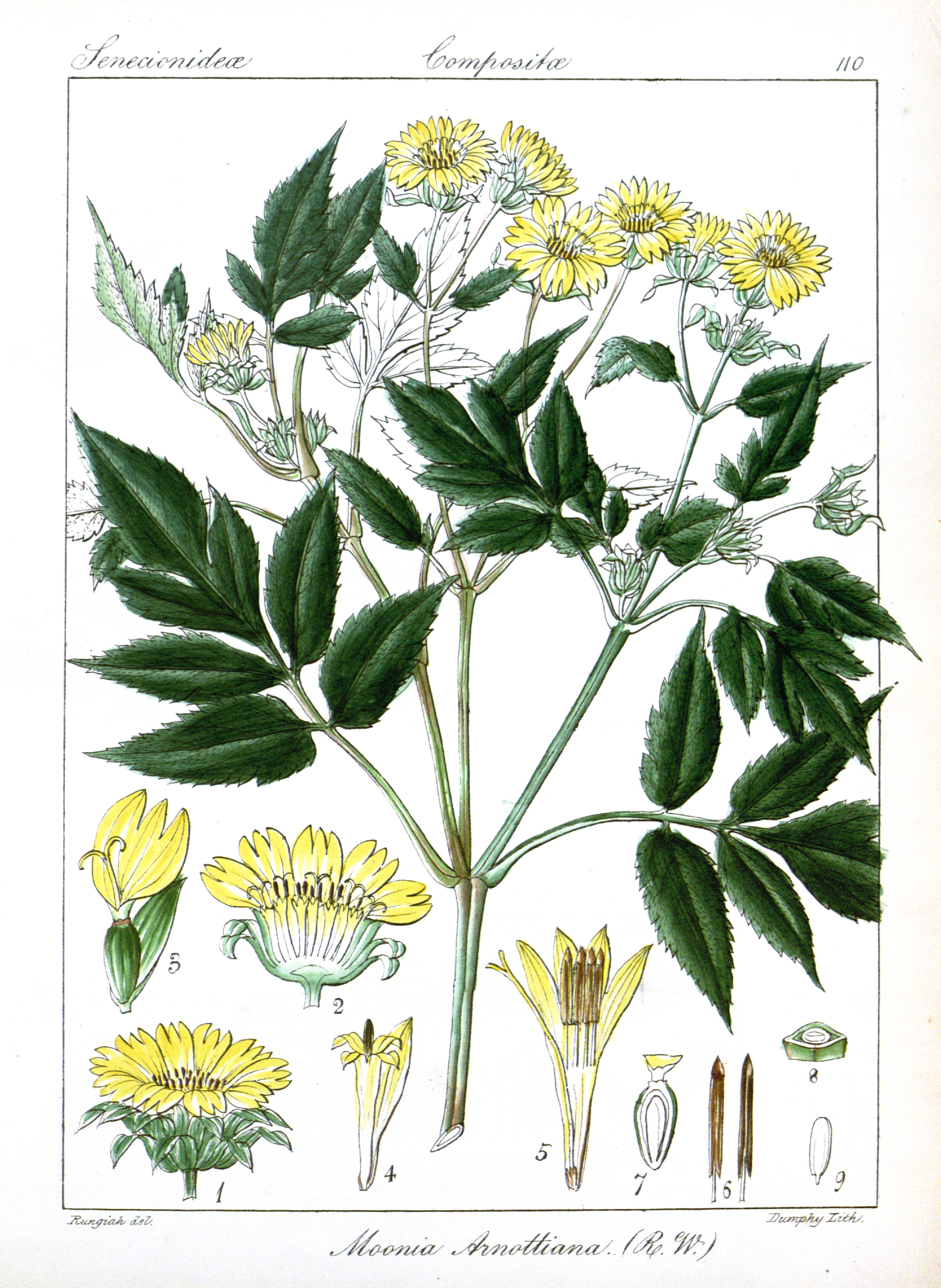
- Moonia arnottiana

Scientific classification
- Kingdom: Plantae
- Clade: Tracheophytes
- Clade: Angiosperms
- Clade: Eudicots
- Clade: Asterids
- Order: Asterales
- Family: Asteraceae
- Subfamily: Asteroideae
- Tribe: Coreopsideae
- Genus: Moonia; Arn.

Type species
- Moonia heterophylla Arn.

Synonyms
- Chrysogonum sect. Moonia (Arn.) Baill.

= Moonia =

Genus of flowering plants

Moonia is a genus of Asian and Australian flowering plants in the daisy family.

== Taxonomy ==
There are difficulties regarding the classification of this genus for its affinities are uncertain. Further studies are needed to clarify its taxonomic and phylogenetic relationships.

== Species list ==
Species

- Moonia arnottiana Wight - Sri Lanka, Kerala, Tamil Nadu, Karnataka
- Moonia ecliptoides (F.Muell.) Benth. - Western Australia, Northern Territory
- Moonia heterophylla Arn. - Sri Lanka, Kerala, Tamil Nadu, Maharashtra
- Moonia moluccana (Blume) J.Kost. - Maluku (now Quadribractea moluccana)
- Moonia procumbens (DC.) Benth. - Queensland, Northern Territory

formerly included

- Moonia quadribracteata (Warb.) Mattf., syn of Quadribractea moluccana (Blume) J.Kost.
- Moonia trichodesmoides (F.Muell.) Benth., syn of Pentalepis trichodesmoides F.Muell.
