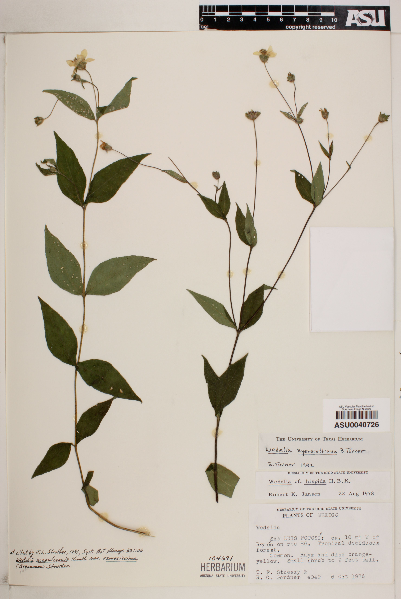

Scientific classification
- Kingdom: Plantae
- Clade: Tracheophytes
- Clade: Angiosperms
- Clade: Eudicots
- Clade: Asterids
- Order: Asterales
- Family: Asteraceae
- Genus: Wedelia
- Species: W. ayerscottiana

Binomial name
- Wedelia ayerscottiana B.L.Turner

= Wedelia ayerscottiana =

Species of flowering plant

Wedelia ayerscottiana is a species of plant in the genus Wedelia native to Nuevo León, Mexico.

== Description ==
This species is identified by small, yellow ray flowers on a scaly base. The leaves are spear shaped and somewhat hairy.

== Habitat ==
According to Turner this species was rare where it was found, which was an oak dominated, low forest.

== Etymology ==
Turner named this species for his two field companions.
