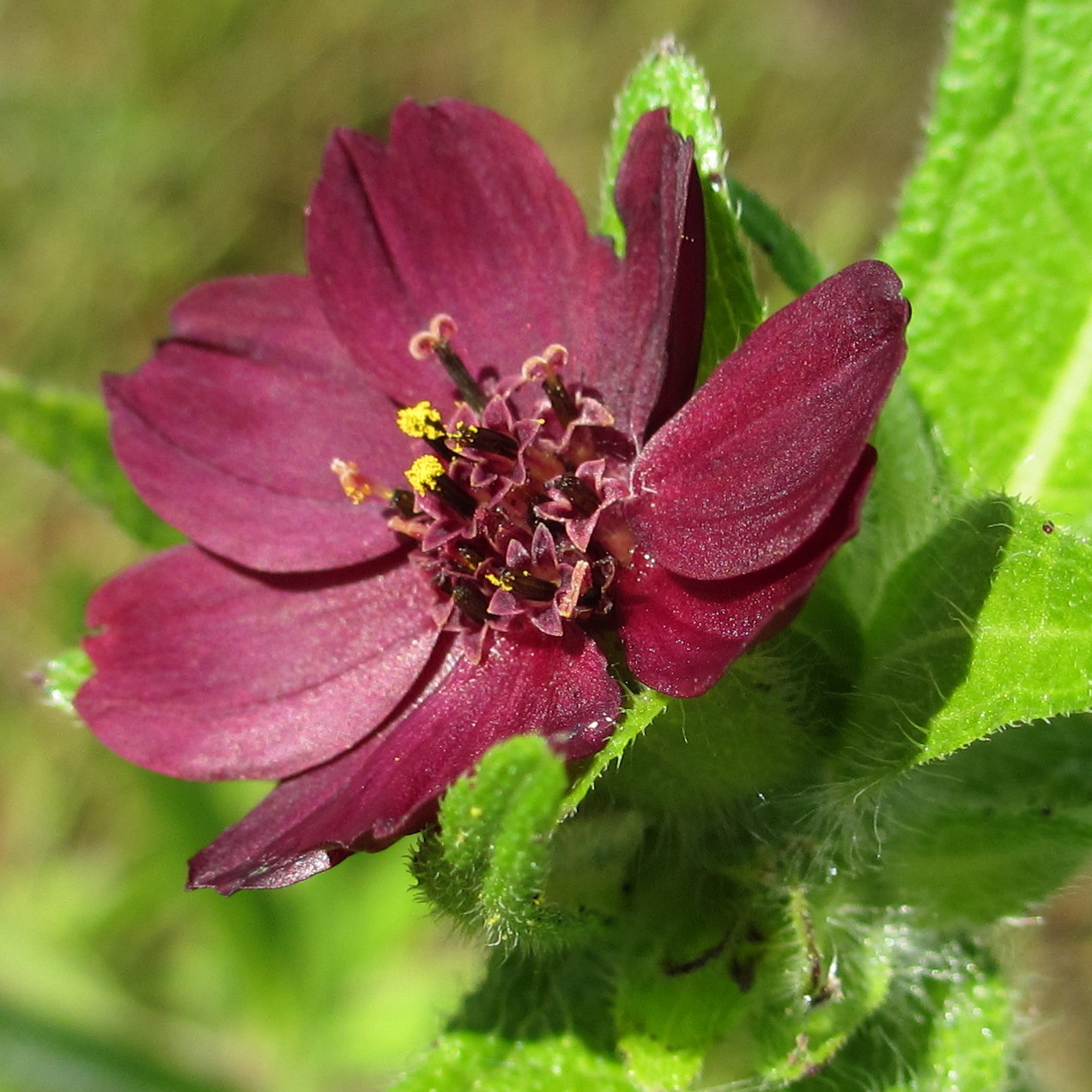
- Aspilia kotschyi (Asteraceae), a weed in disturbed areas

Scientific classification
- Kingdom: Plantae
- Clade: Tracheophytes
- Clade: Angiosperms
- Clade: Eudicots
- Clade: Asterids
- Order: Asterales
- Family: Asteraceae
- Genus: Aspilia
- Species: A. kotschyi

Binomial name
- Aspilia kotschyi (Sch.Bip. ex Hochst.) Oliv.

Synonyms
- Coronocarpus kotschyi (Sch.Bip. ex Hochst.) Benth.; Dipterotheca kotschyi Sch.Bip. ex Hochst.; Wedelia kotschyi (Sch.Bip.) Soldano; Wirtgenia kotschyi (Sch.Bip. ex Hochst.) Sch.Bip.

= Aspilia kotschyi =

Species of plant

Aspilia kotschyi is a species of herbaceous plant in the family Asteraceae. It has ovate to narrowly lanceolate leaves and dark red-purple flowers commonly found Tropical Africa. It has a variety, Aspilia kotschyi var. alba which has white flowers.

== Description ==
Leaves are simple and opposite in arrangement and borne from the stem; leaf-blade is ovate to narrowly lanceolate, 3–16 cm long and 1–4 cm wide. Inflorescence is capitulum type, solitary, axillary or sessile clustered around the upper surface of leaves, it has ovoid bracts and small dark purple-brown ray and disc flowers; phyllary is green but brownish around the base.

== Distribution ==
Endemic to Tropical Africa, it occurs from Senegal eastwards towards Ethiopia and southwards up to Zimbabwe.
