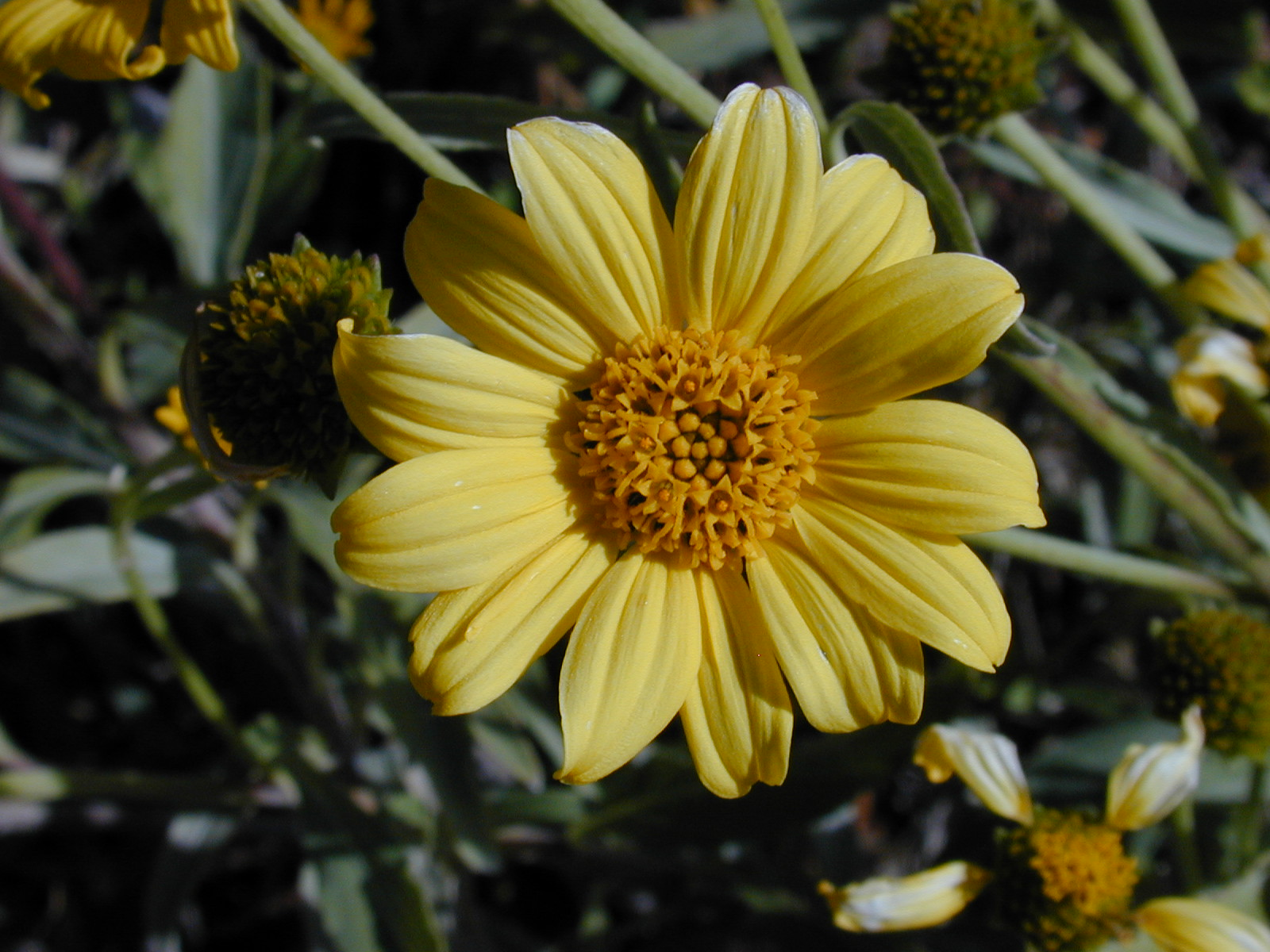

Conservation status
- Imperiled (NatureServe)

Scientific classification
- Kingdom: Plantae
- Clade: Tracheophytes
- Clade: Angiosperms
- Clade: Eudicots
- Clade: Asterids
- Order: Asterales
- Family: Asteraceae
- Tribe: Heliantheae
- Genus: Lipochaeta
- Species: L. lobata

Binomial name
- Lipochaeta lobata (Gaudich.) DC.

= Lipochaeta lobata =

Species of shrub

Lipochaeta lobata is a species of flowering plant in the family Asteraceae known by the common name shrubland nehe. It is endemic to Hawaii, where it can be found in coastal dry shrublands and dry forests on Oʻahu, Maui, and Niʻihau.

There are two varieties of this species. One, var. leptophylla, is a federally listed endangered species of the United States.
