= Wedelia pimana =

Scientific classification
- Kingdom: Plantae
- Clade: Tracheophytes
- Clade: Angiosperms
- Clade: Eudicots
- Clade: Asterids
- Order: Asterales
- Family: Asteraceae
- Genus: Wedelia
- Species: W. pimana

Binomial name
- Wedelia pimana B.L.Turner

Species of flowering plant

Wedelia pimana is a plant species in the genus Wedelia in the family Asteraceae. It is native to the Sierra Madre Occidental in the Mexican state of Chihuahua. It is an herb with yellow flowers, growing in fallow agricultural fields in a region with predominantly pine-oak forest.

Type specimen was collected in the village of Nabogame, 18 km northwest of the town of Yepachi, Chihuahua, at an elevation of approximately 1800 m. The village is inhabited by indigenous people of the Mountain Pima or Pima Bajo ethnic group; the epithet pimana was chosen in their honor.
