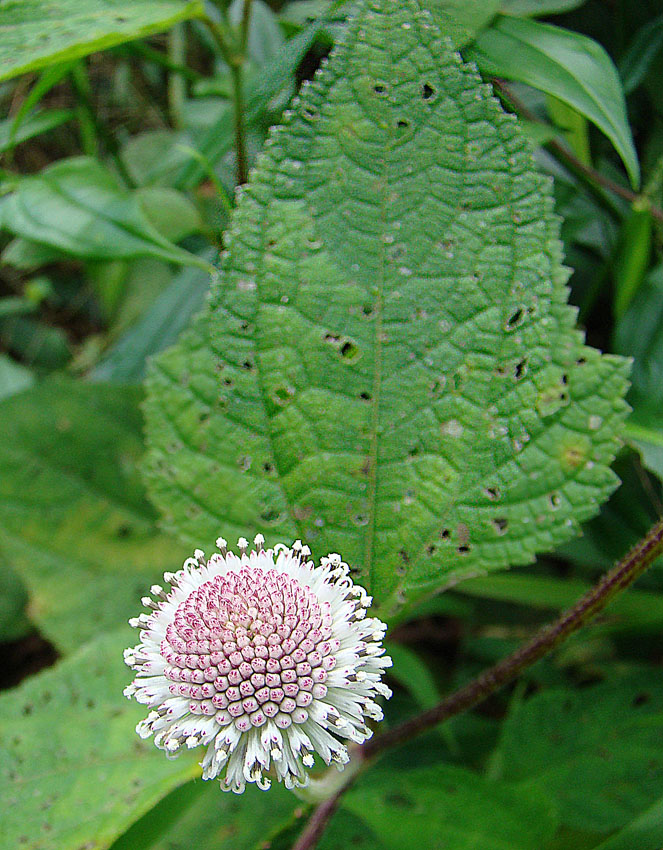

Conservation status
- Secure (NatureServe)

Scientific classification
- Kingdom: Plantae
- Clade: Tracheophytes
- Clade: Angiosperms
- Clade: Eudicots
- Clade: Asterids
- Order: Asterales
- Family: Asteraceae
- Genus: Melanthera
- Species: M. nivea

Binomial name
- Melanthera nivea (L.) Small, 1903

Synonyms
- (≡) Bidens nivea L. (=) Calea aspera Jacq. (=) Melanthera aspera (Jacq.) Small

= Melanthera nivea =

Species of flowering plant

Melanthera nivea, also known as pineland squarestem, snow squarestem and Spanish: yerba de cabra, is a species of flowering plant in the family Asteraceae. It grows in the Americas.

== Distribution ==
It is found in the SE United States, including Louisiana, Mississippi Alabama, Georgia, Florida, South Carolina, Tennessee, Kentucky and Illinois, as well as in the Caribbean Islands, Mexico (from Tamaulipas to Quintana Roo), Central America and South America, including Colombia, Venezuela, Ecuador, Guianas and northern Brazil.
