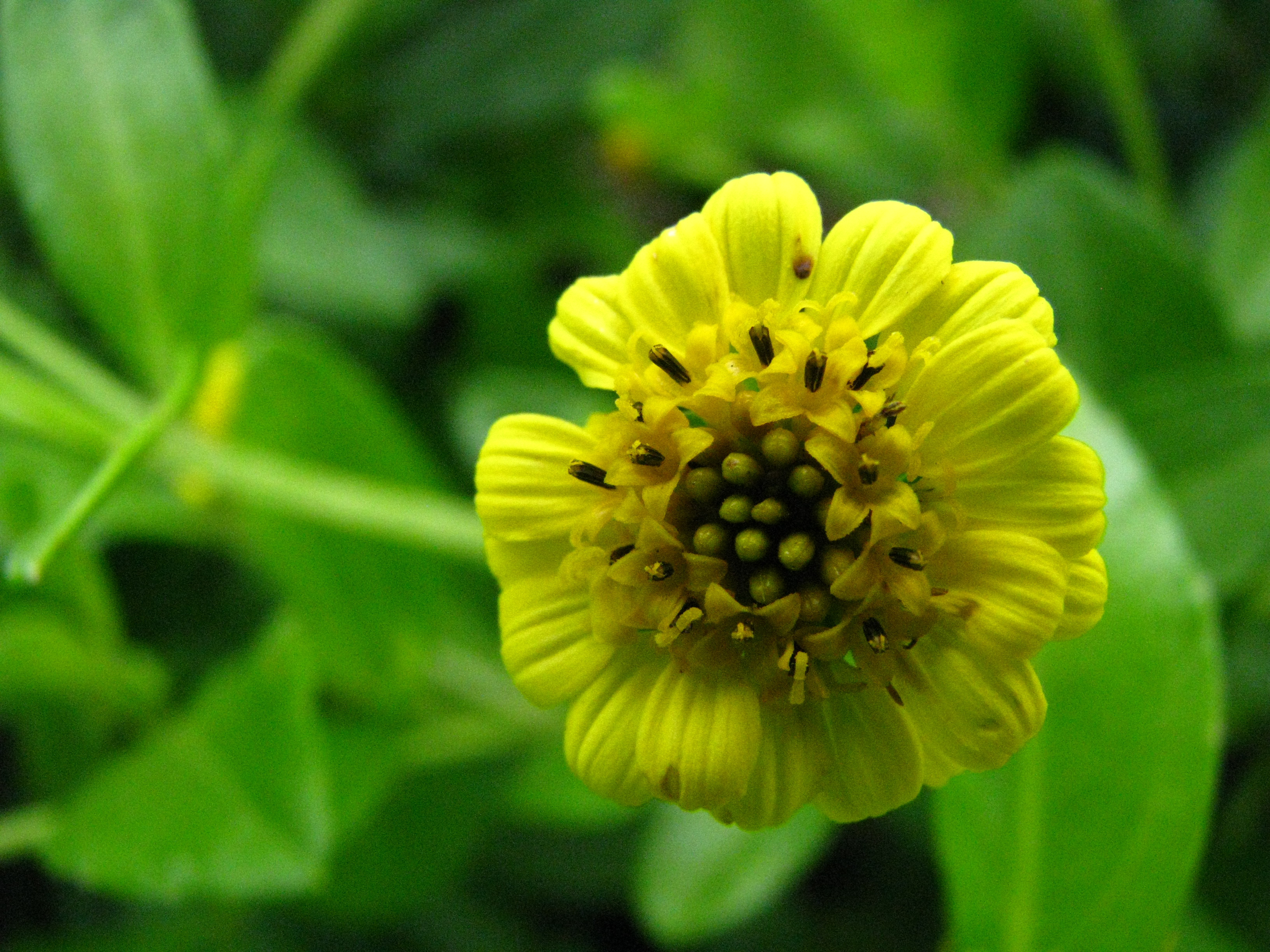
- Lipochaeta succulenta

Scientific classification
- Kingdom: Plantae
- Clade: Tracheophytes
- Clade: Angiosperms
- Clade: Eudicots
- Clade: Asterids
- Order: Asterales
- Family: Asteraceae
- Subtribe: Ecliptinae
- Genus: Lipochaeta; DC.

Synonyms
- Schizophyllum Nutt.; Macraea Hook. f. 1847, illegitimate homonym, not Lindl. 1828 (Geraniaceae) nor Wight 1852 (Phyllanthaceae)

= Lipochaeta =

Genus of flowering plants

Lipochaeta, common name nehe, is a genus of flowering plants in the family Asteraceae that is endemic to Hawaii.

== Taxonomy ==
There are difficulties regarding the classification of this genus for its affinities are uncertain. Some studies have been done to clarify its taxonomic and phylogenetic relationships.

== Species ==
20 species are accepted.

- † Lipochaeta bryanii Sherff – Kahoolawe
- Lipochaeta connata (Gaudich.) DC. – Nehe – Kauai, W. Maui
- † Lipochaeta degeneri Sherff – Molokai nehe – SW. Molokai. Last recorded in 1928.
- Lipochaeta fauriei H.Lév. – Kauai
- Lipochaeta heterophylla A.Gray – Lavaflow nehe – Molokai, Lanai, Maui
- Lipochaeta integrifolia (Nutt.) A.Gray
- Lipochaeta kamolensis O.Deg. & Sherff – SE. Maui
- Lipochaeta lavarum (Gaudich.) DC.
- Lipochaeta lobata (Gaudich.) DC. – Shrubland nehe – Niihau, Oahu, W. Maui
  - Lipochaeta lobata var. leptophylla O.Deg. & Sherff
  - Lipochaeta lobata var. lobata
- Lipochaeta micrantha (Nutt.) A.Gray – Kauai
- † Lipochaeta perdita Sherff – Niihau: Kawaihoa Pt. Last recorded in 1949.
- † Lipochaeta populifolia (Sherff) R.C.Gardner – Lanai: Maunalei Valley
- Lipochaeta × procumbens O.Deg. & Sherff (L. integrifolia × L. lobata)
- Lipochaeta remyi A.Gray – Oahu
- Lipochaeta rockii Sherff – Rock's nehe
- Lipochaeta subcordata A.Gray – Hawaii
- Lipochaeta succulenta (Hook. & Arn.) DC. – Seaside nehe
- Lipochaeta tenuifolia A.Gray – Oahu
- Lipochaeta tenuis O.Deg. & Sherff – Oahu
- Lipochaeta venosa Sherff – Hawaii
- Lipochaeta waimeaensis H.St.John – Kauai

=== Formerly placed here ===
- Wedelia acapulcensis var. hispida (Kunth) Strother (as L. texana Torr. & A.Gray)
