= Lipochaeta venosa =

Conservation status
- Critically Imperiled (NatureServe)

- Critically Endangered (IUCN 3.1)

Scientific classification
- Kingdom: Plantae
- Clade: Tracheophytes
- Clade: Angiosperms
- Clade: Eudicots
- Clade: Asterids
- Order: Asterales
- Family: Asteraceae
- Genus: Lipochaeta
- Species: L. venosa

Binomial name
- Lipochaeta venosa Sherff (1933)

Synonyms
- Lipochaeta pinnatifida H.St.John (1985); Lipochaeta setosa H.St.John (1985); Melanthera venosa (Sherff) W.L.Wagner & H.Rob. (2001); Wollastonia venosa (Sherff) Orchard (2013)

Species of flowering plant

Lipochaeta venosa is a rare species of flowering plant in the family Asteraceae known by the common name spreading nehe. It is endemic to Hawaii, where it is known only from the island of Hawaii. It is federally listed as an endangered species of the United States.

This perennial herb produces daisylike yellow flower heads. It grows on cinder cones on Hawaii, where there are six occurrences for a total population around 3000 individuals.

The main threat to the species is the loss and degradation of its habitat. Much of the area is ranchland grazed by cattle and roamed by feral pigs. Non-native plants and fire also damage the habitat. Cinder mining occurs in the area, destroying local vegetation.
