= Lipochaeta waimeaensis =

Conservation status
- Critically Imperiled (NatureServe)

- Critically Endangered (IUCN 3.1)

Scientific classification
- Kingdom: Plantae
- Clade: Tracheophytes
- Clade: Angiosperms
- Clade: Eudicots
- Clade: Asterids
- Order: Asterales
- Family: Asteraceae
- Genus: Lipochaeta
- Species: L. waimeaensis

Binomial name
- Lipochaeta waimeaensis H.St.John (1972)

Synonyms
- Melanthera waimeaensis (H.St.John) W.L.Wagner & H.Rob. (2001); Wollastonia waimeaensis (H.St.John) Orchard (2013)

Species of flowering plant

Lipochaeta waimeaensis is a rare species of flowering plant in the family Asteraceae known by the common name Waimea Canyon nehe. It is endemic to Hawaii, where it is known only from the island of Kauai. It is federally listed as an endangered species of the United States.

This perennial herb produces daisylike yellow flower heads. It only grows on steep slopes along the rim of Waimea Canyon on Kauai, where there are about 180 plants remaining.

The main threat to the species is the loss and degradation of its habitat. Most of the land on which it grows has been taken over by non-native plants. It is also threatened by erosion caused by the activity of feral goats. The plants are eaten by mice, rats, and the spittle bug Claspoptera xanthocephala.
