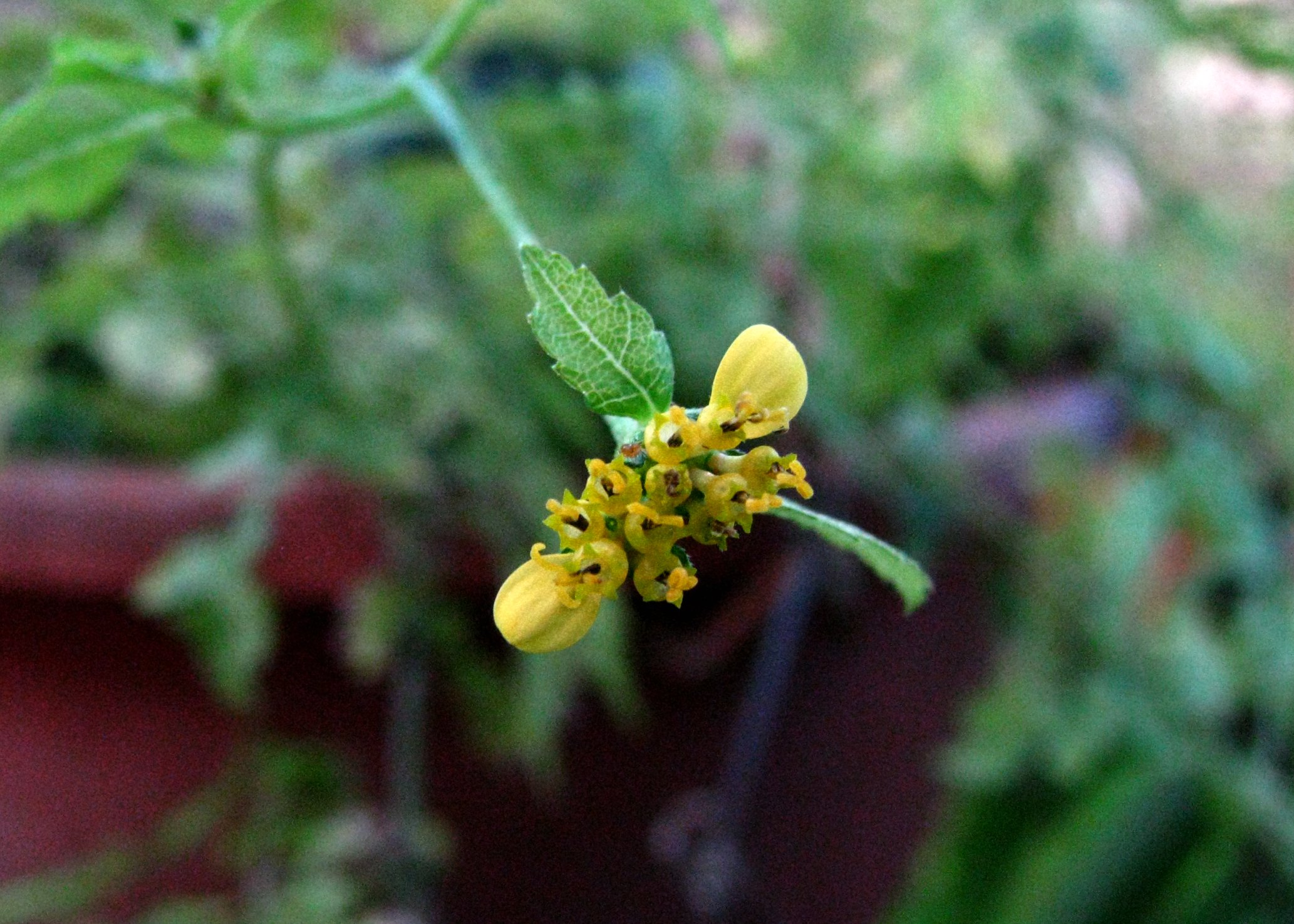
- Lipochaeta micrantha subsp micrantha (cultivated)

Conservation status
- Critically Imperiled (NatureServe)

- Critically Endangered (IUCN 3.1)

Scientific classification
- Kingdom: Plantae
- Clade: Tracheophytes
- Clade: Angiosperms
- Clade: Eudicots
- Clade: Asterids
- Order: Asterales
- Family: Asteraceae
- Genus: Lipochaeta
- Species: L. micrantha

Binomial name
- Lipochaeta micrantha (Nutt.) A.Gray (1861)

Synonyms
- Aphanopappus micranthus (Nutt.) A.Heller (1897); Melanthera micrantha (Nutt.) W.L.Wagner & H.Rob. (2001); Schizophyllum micranthum Nutt. (1841); Wollastonia micrantha (Nutt.) Orchard (2013)

= Lipochaeta micrantha =

Species of flowering plant

Lipochaeta micrantha, known by the common name Kauai nehe, is a rare species of flowering plant in the family Asteraceae.

== Distribution ==
The plant is endemic to Hawaii, where it is known only from the island of Kauai.

It grows on slopes and in gulches in forested habitat. There are seven populations for a total of fewer than 1100 individuals.

== Description ==
Lipochaeta micrantha is sprawling perennial herb. It produces thin trailing stems with 'fernlike' foliage on compound pedate leaves.

It produces daisylike yellow flower heads on long stems. They are less than 0.5 inches (1.3 cm) in diameter

=== Subspecies ===
Two subspecies are accepted.

- Lipochaeta micrantha subsp. exigua (O.Deg. & Sherff) R.C.Gardner
- Lipochaeta micrantha subsp. micrantha

== Conservation ==
It is federally listed as an endangered species of the United States. The main threat to the species is the loss and degradation of its habitat caused by feral ungulates and non-native plants.

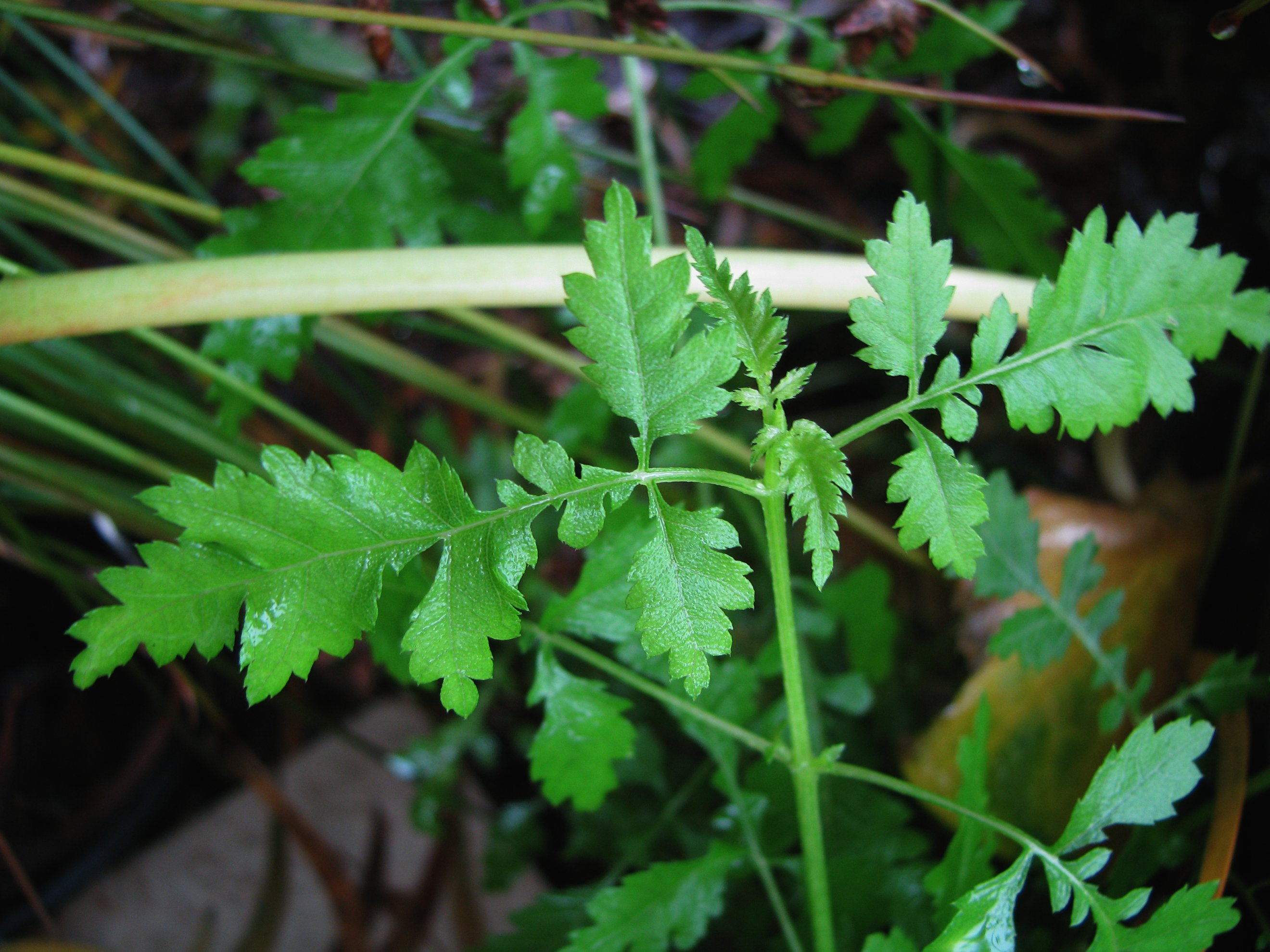
Stem with compound pedate leaves.

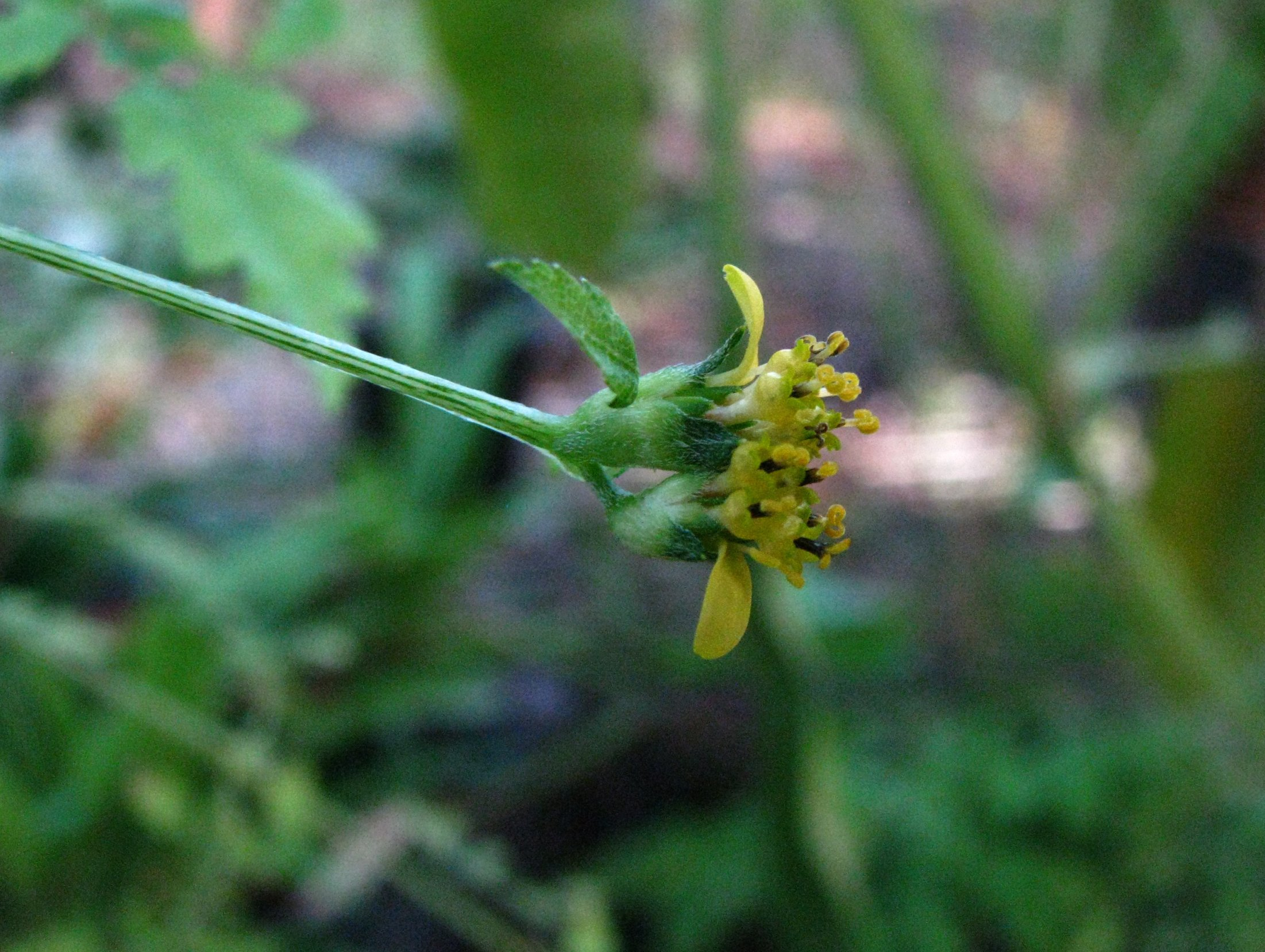
Close up of flower.

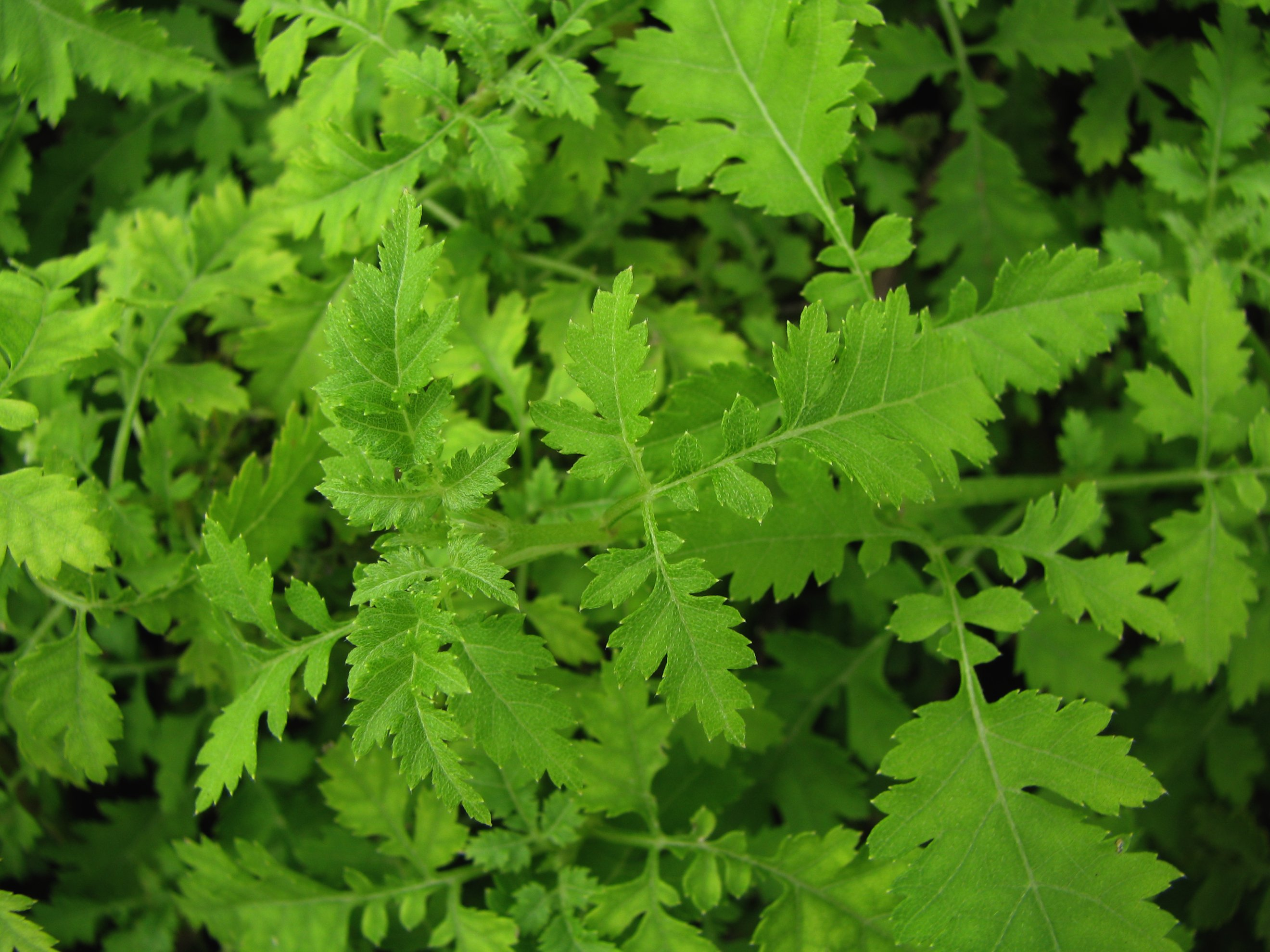
Foliage texture.
