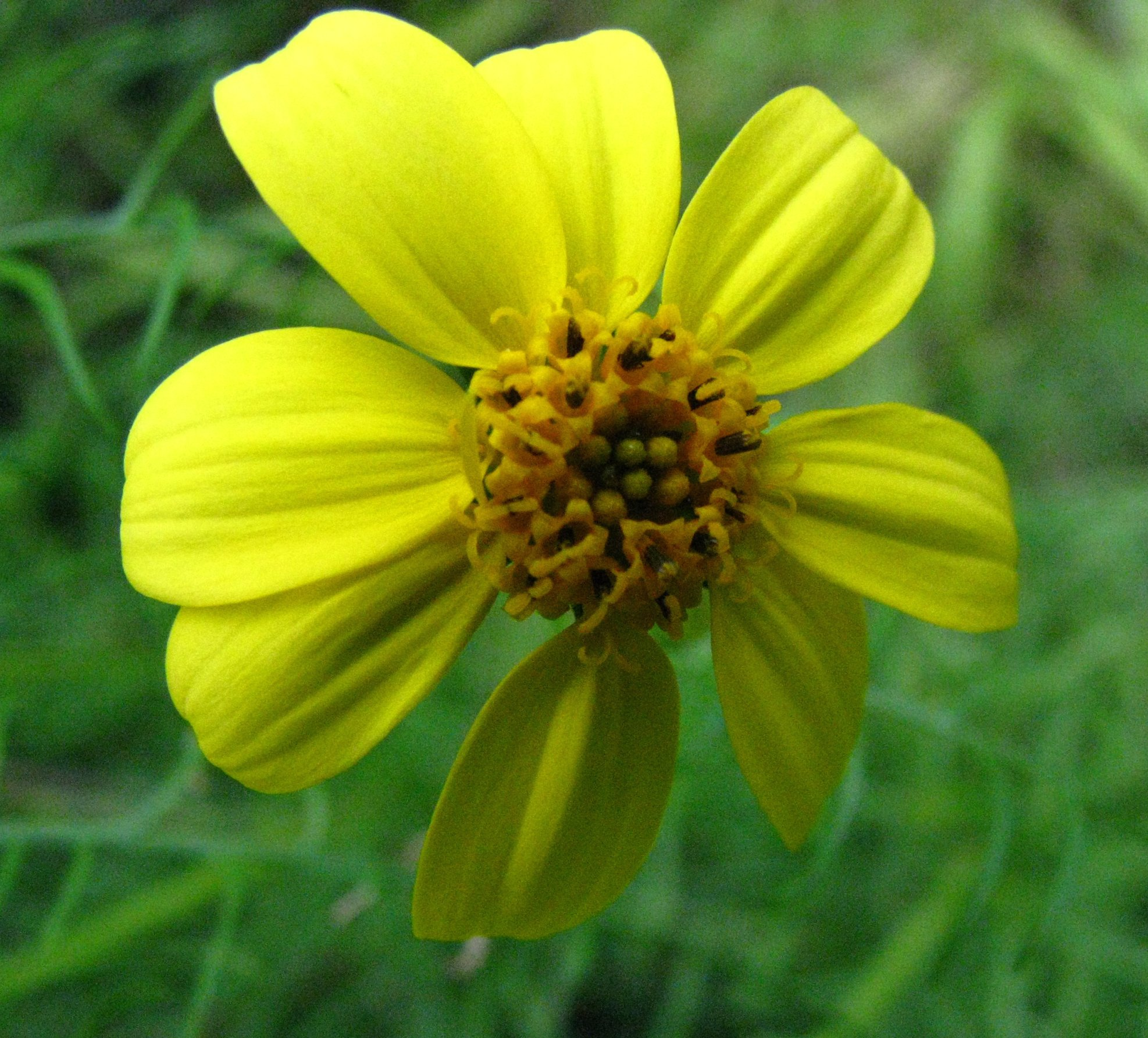

Conservation status
- Critically Imperiled (NatureServe)

- Critically Endangered (IUCN 3.1)

Scientific classification
- Kingdom: Plantae
- Clade: Tracheophytes
- Clade: Angiosperms
- Clade: Eudicots
- Clade: Asterids
- Order: Asterales
- Family: Asteraceae
- Genus: Lipochaeta
- Species: L. tenuifolia

Binomial name
- Lipochaeta tenuifolia A.Gray (1861)

Synonyms
- Melanthera tenuifolia (A.Gray) W.L.Wagner & H.Rob. (2001); Wollastonia tenuifolia (A.Gray) Orchard (2013)

= Lipochaeta tenuifolia =

Species of flowering plant

Lipochaeta tenuifolia is a rare species of flowering plant in the family Asteraceae known by the common names Waianae Range nehe and slender-leaf nehe.

It is endemic to Hawaii, where it is known only from the island of Oahu. It grows on mountain slopes and ridges and is limited to the Waianae Range of Oahu. There are 10 occurrences for a total population between 2,000 and 3,000 individuals.

== Description ==
Lipochaeta tenuifolia is perennial herb produces daisylike yellow flower heads and highly dissected, lacy-looking leaves.

== Conservation ==
It is federally listed as an endangered species of the United States. The main threat to the species is the loss and degradation of its habitat caused by feral ungulates, non-native plants, and fire.
