= Aspilia lisowskiana =

Scientific classification
- Kingdom: Plantae
- Clade: Tracheophytes
- Clade: Angiosperms
- Clade: Eudicots
- Clade: Asterids
- Order: Asterales
- Family: Asteraceae
- Genus: Aspilia
- Species: A. lisowskiana

Binomial name
- Aspilia lisowskiana D.J.N.Hind

Synonyms
- Aspilia elegans (C.D.Adams) J.-P.Lebrun & A.Stork; Melanthera elegans C.D.Adams

Species of flowering plant

Aspilia lisowskiana is a species of flowering plant in the family Asteraceae. It is native to Guinea, Mali, and Côte d'Ivoire in West Africa.
