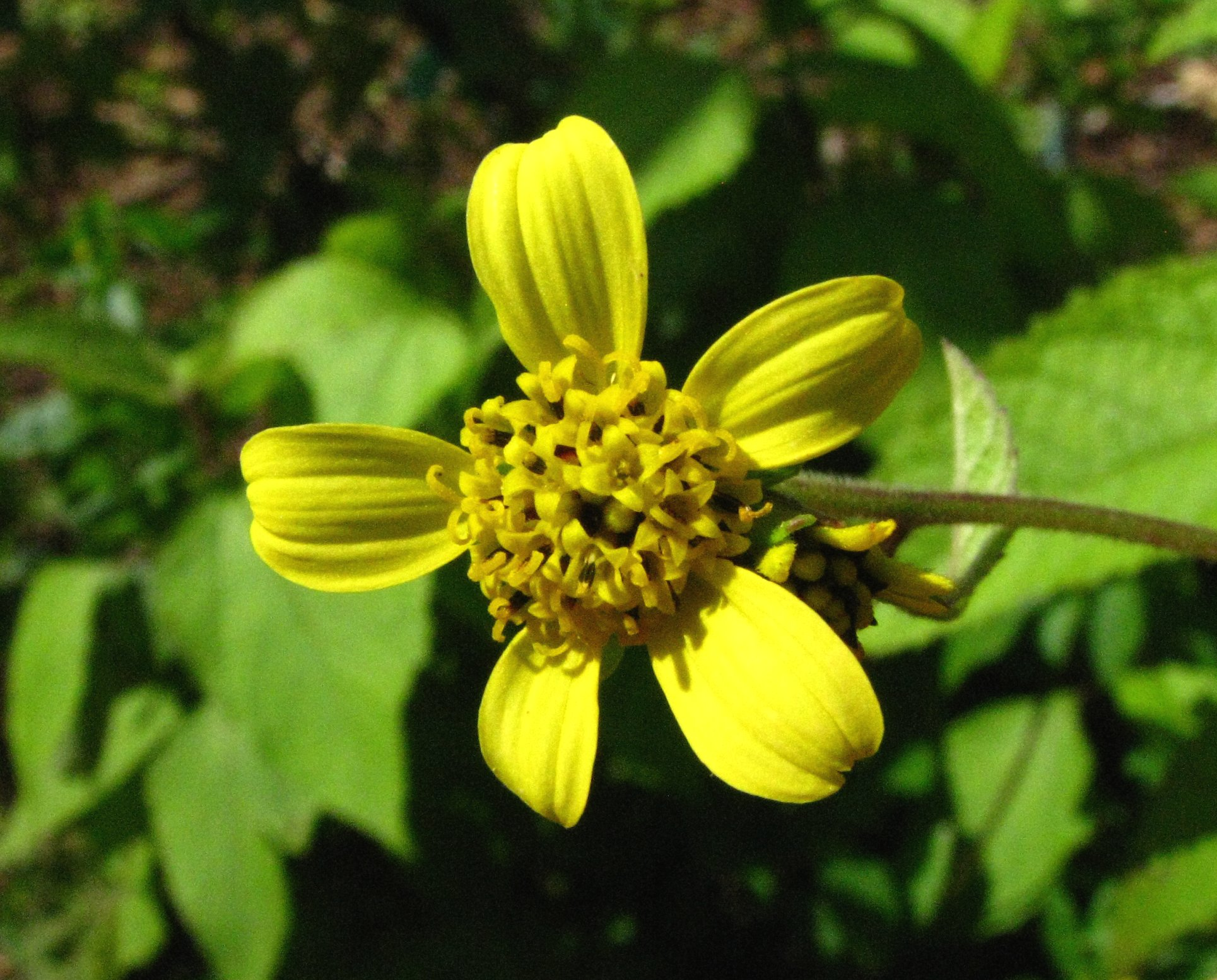

Conservation status
- Critically Imperiled (NatureServe)

- Critically Endangered (IUCN 3.1)

Scientific classification
- Kingdom: Plantae
- Clade: Tracheophytes
- Clade: Angiosperms
- Clade: Eudicots
- Clade: Asterids
- Order: Asterales
- Family: Asteraceae
- Tribe: Heliantheae
- Genus: Lipochaeta
- Species: L. fauriei

Binomial name
- Lipochaeta fauriei H.Lév. (1911)

Synonyms
- Lipochaeta deltoidea H.St.John (1972); Melanthera fauriei (H.Lév.) W.L.Wagner & H.Rob. (2001); Wollastonia fauriei (H.Lév.) Orchard (2013)

= Lipochaeta fauriei =

Species of flowering plant

Lipochaeta fauriei known by the common name Olokele Canyon nehe, is a rare species of flowering plant in the aster family.

== Distribution ==
The plant is endemic to Hawaiʻi, where it is known only from the island of Kauaʻi.

It grows in several types of forest on Kauaʻi, and can be found in dry, moist, and wet habitat.

== Description ==
Lipochaeta fauriei is sprawling perennial herb.

It produces daisylike yellow flower heads.

== Conservation ==
Lipochaeta fauriei is federally listed as an endangered species of the United States. There are only ten populations remaining, with a total global population of no more than 240 plants.

The main threat to the species is the loss and degradation of its habitat caused by deer, goats, rats, wild boars, fires, landslides, and invasive plant species.

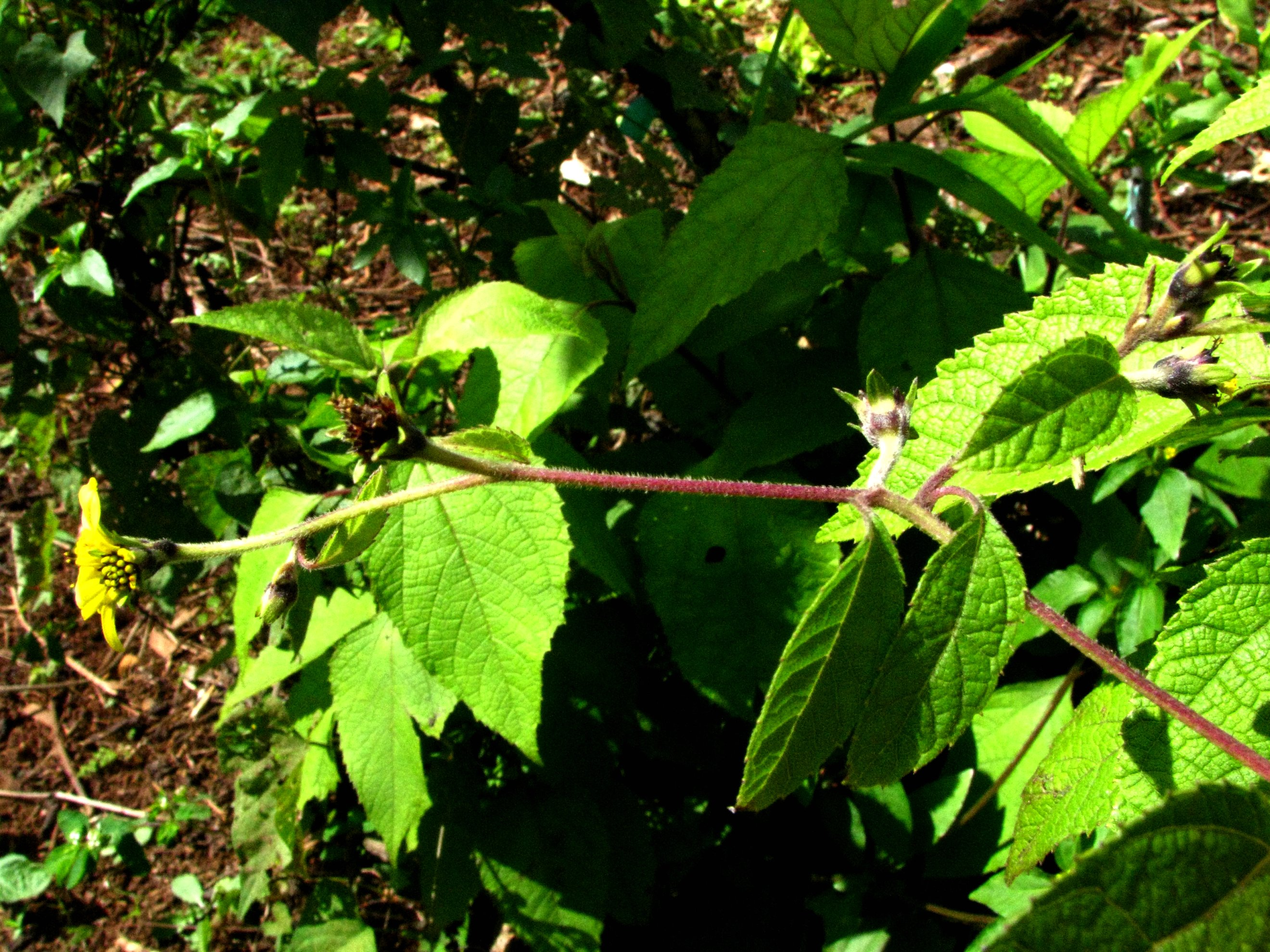
Pubescent thin stem with flower

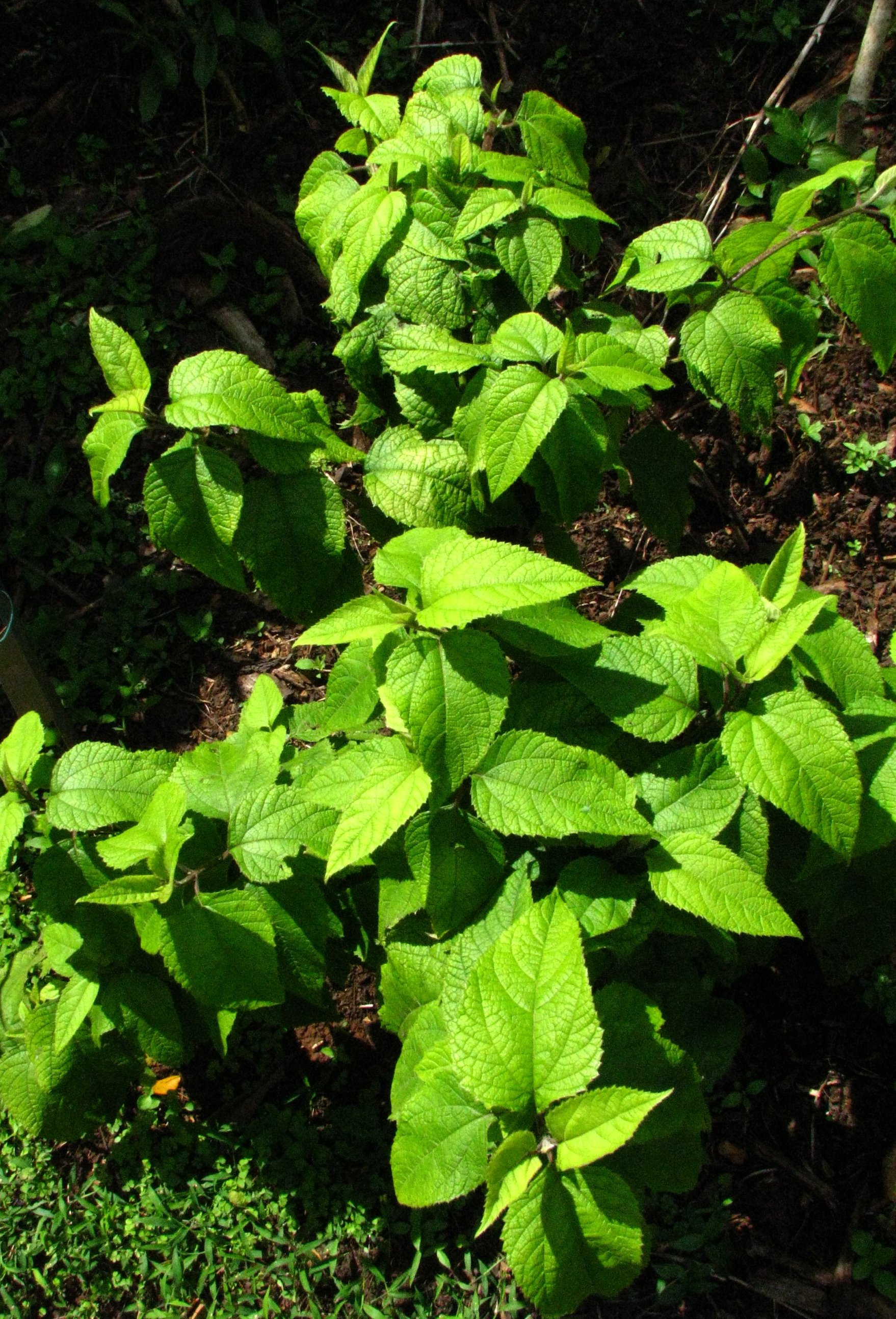
Plant form and foliage texture
