= Lipochaeta kamolensis =

Conservation status
- Critically Imperiled (NatureServe)

Scientific classification
- Kingdom: Plantae
- Clade: Tracheophytes
- Clade: Angiosperms
- Clade: Eudicots
- Clade: Asterids
- Order: Asterales
- Family: Asteraceae
- Genus: Lipochaeta
- Species: L. kamolensis

Binomial name
- Lipochaeta kamolensis O.Deg. & Sherff (1951)

Synonyms
- Melanthera kamolensis (O.Deg. & Sherff) W.L.Wagner & H.Rob. (2001); Wollastonia kamolensis (O.Deg. & Sherff) Orchard (2013)

Species of flowering plant

Lipochaeta kamolensis known by the common name Maui nehe, is a rare species of flowering plant in the family Asteraceae.

== Distribution ==
The plant is endemic to Hawaiʻi, where it is known only from the island of Maui.

It grows on slopes and gulches in a small stretch of shrubland on the southern side of East Maui island. There is one population located in Kamole Gulch, the type locality. In 2005 this population contained only 25 mature plants.

Nearby there is another population which appears to be a hybrid swarm of plants descended from Lipochaeta kamolensis and L. rockii crosses.

== Description ==
Lipochaeta kamolensis is a sprawling perennial herb.

It produces daisylike yellow flower heads.

=== Conservation ===
Lipochaeta kamolensis is federally listed as an endangered species of the United States.

The main threat to the species is the loss and degradation of its habitat caused by ungulates, non-native plants, and fires.
