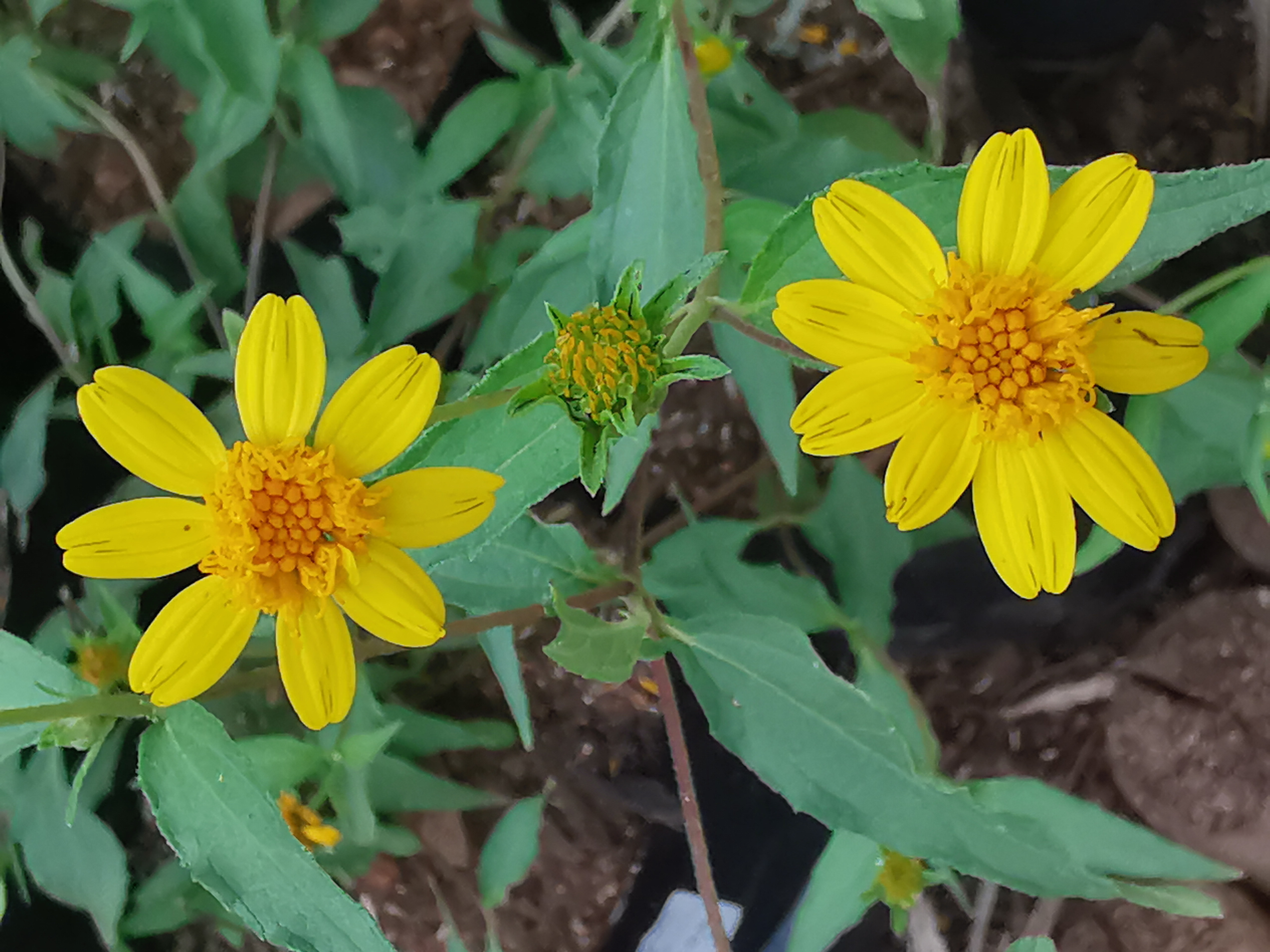
- Aspilia mossambicensis

Scientific classification
- Kingdom: Plantae
- Clade: Embryophytes
- Clade: Tracheophytes
- Clade: Angiosperms
- Clade: Eudicots
- Clade: Asterids
- Order: Asterales
- Family: Asteraceae
- Subfamily: Asteroideae
- Tribe: Heliantheae
- Subtribe: Ecliptinae
- Genus: Aspilia; Thouars

Type species
- Aspilia thouarsii DC.

Synonyms
- Coronocarpus Schumach.; Dipterotheca Sch.Bip. ex Hochst.; Harpephora Endl.; Menotriche Steetz; Wirtgenia Sch.Bip.

= Aspilia =

Genus of flowering plants

Aspilia is a genus of flowering plants in the family Asteraceae. Aspilia is native to sub-Saharan Africa, Madagascar, Yemen, and tropical South America. Some authors have merged this genus with Wedelia, but others maintain that more study is required.

== Medicinal uses ==
Historically, Aspilia africana was used in Mbaise and most Igbo speaking parts of Nigeria to prevent conception, suggesting potential contraceptive and anti-fertility properties. Leaf extract and fractions of A. africana effectively arrested bleeding from fresh wounds, inhibited microbial growth of known wound contaminants and accelerated wound healing process. Aspilia is hypothesized to be used as herbal medicine by some chimpanzees.

== Species ==
63 species are currently accepted.

- Aspilia africana (Pers.) C.D.Adams
- Aspilia albuquerquei J.U.Santos
- Aspilia almasensis D.J.N.Hind
- Aspilia andrade-limae J.U.Santos
- Aspilia angolensis Muschl.
- Aspilia angustifolia Oliv. & Hiern
- Aspilia aristata Griseb. (unplaced)
- Aspilia baumii O.Hoffm. (unplaced)
- Aspilia belo-horizontinae J.U.Santos
- Aspilia bipartita O.Hoffm.
- Aspilia bojeri DC.
- Aspilia bussei O.Hoffm. & Muschl.
- Aspilia caudata J.U.Santos
- Aspilia calvacantei J.U.Santos
- Aspilia cearensis J.U.Santos
- Aspilia chevalieri O.Hoffm. & Muschl.
- Aspilia ciliata (Schumach.) Wild
- Aspilia clausseniana Baker
- Aspilia cordifolia J.U.Santos
- Aspilia diamantinae J.U.Santos
- Aspilia diniz-cruziana J.U.Santos
- Aspilia discolor J.U.Santos
- Aspilia duarteana J.U.Santos
- Aspilia eckendorffii Philipson
- Aspilia eenii S.Moore
- Aspilia egleri J.U.Santos
- Aspilia erosa J.U.Santos
- Aspilia espinhacensis J.U.Santos
- Aspilia foliosa Benth. & Hook.f.
- Aspilia gillettii Wild
- Aspilia glaziovii Baker
- Aspilia goiazensis J.U.Santos
- Aspilia grazielae J.U.Santos
- Aspilia hatschbachii J.U.Santos
- Aspilia helianthoides (Schumach. & Thonn.) Oliv. & Hiern
- Aspilia ioletae J.U.Santos
- Aspilia itabaianensis J.U.Santos
- Aspilia jolyana G.M.Barroso
- Aspilia kotschyi (Sch.Bip. ex Hochst.) Oliv.
- Aspilia kunthiana S.F.Blake
- Aspilia latissima Malme
- Aspilia linearis S.F.Blake
- Aspilia lisowskiana D.J.N.Hind
- Aspilia macrorrhiza Chiov.
- Aspilia malaissei Lisowski
- Aspilia matogrossensis J.U.Santos
- Aspilia mendoncae Wild
- Aspilia minima Humbert
- Aspilia mossambicensis (Oliv.) Wild
- Aspilia natalensis (Sond.) Wild
- Aspilia paludosa Berhaut
- Aspilia paraensis (Huber) J.U.Santos
- Aspilia pereirae J.U.Santos
- Aspilia platyphylla Huber) J.U.Santos
- Aspilia pluriseta Schweinf. ex Engl.
- Aspilia pohlii Baker
- Aspilia prostrata J.U.Santos
- Aspilia pseudocalea G.H.L. da Silva & A.M.Teles
- Aspilia rudis Oliv. & Hiern
- Aspilia rugulosa Humbert
- Aspilia sahariensis O.Hoffm. & Muschl.
- Aspilia subscandens J.U.Santos
- Aspilia thouarsii DC.
- Aspilia trichodesmoides O.Hoffm.
- Aspilia triplinervia (Kunth) S.F.Blake
