= Rhysolepis =

Scientific classification
- Kingdom: Plantae
- Clade: Tracheophytes
- Clade: Angiosperms
- Clade: Eudicots
- Clade: Asterids
- Order: Asterales
- Family: Asteraceae
- Subfamily: Asteroideae
- Tribe: Heliantheae
- Subtribe: Helianthinae
- Genus: Rhysolepis; S.F.Blake

Genus of plants

Rhysolepis was a genus of Mexican plants in the tribe Heliantheae within the family Asteraceae. Until 2011, when botanists Schilling & Panero studied the subtribe Helianthinae based on molecular sequences of nuclear ITS, ETS, and cpDNA, coming to a conclusion that the genus Viguiera Kunth, did not constitute a monophyletic group. Among their conclusions they proposed to reclassify the genus, dividing and relocating its species in at least eleven genera: Aldama La Llave, Bahiopsis Kellogg, Calanticaria (B.L. Rob. & Greenm.) E.E. Schill. & Panero, Davilanthus E.E. Schill. & Panero, Dendroviguiera E.E. Schill. & Panero, Gonzalezia E.E. Schill. & Panero, Heiseria E.E. Schill. & Panero, Heliomeris Nutt., Hymenostephium Benth., Sidneya E.E. Schill. & Panero and Viguiera Kunth.

Former Species;

- Rhysolepis kingii H.Rob. now Aldama kingii (H.Rob.) E.E.Schill. & Panero
- Rhysolepis morelensis (Greenm.) S.F.Blake now Aldama morelensis (S.F.Blake) E.E.Schill. & Panero
