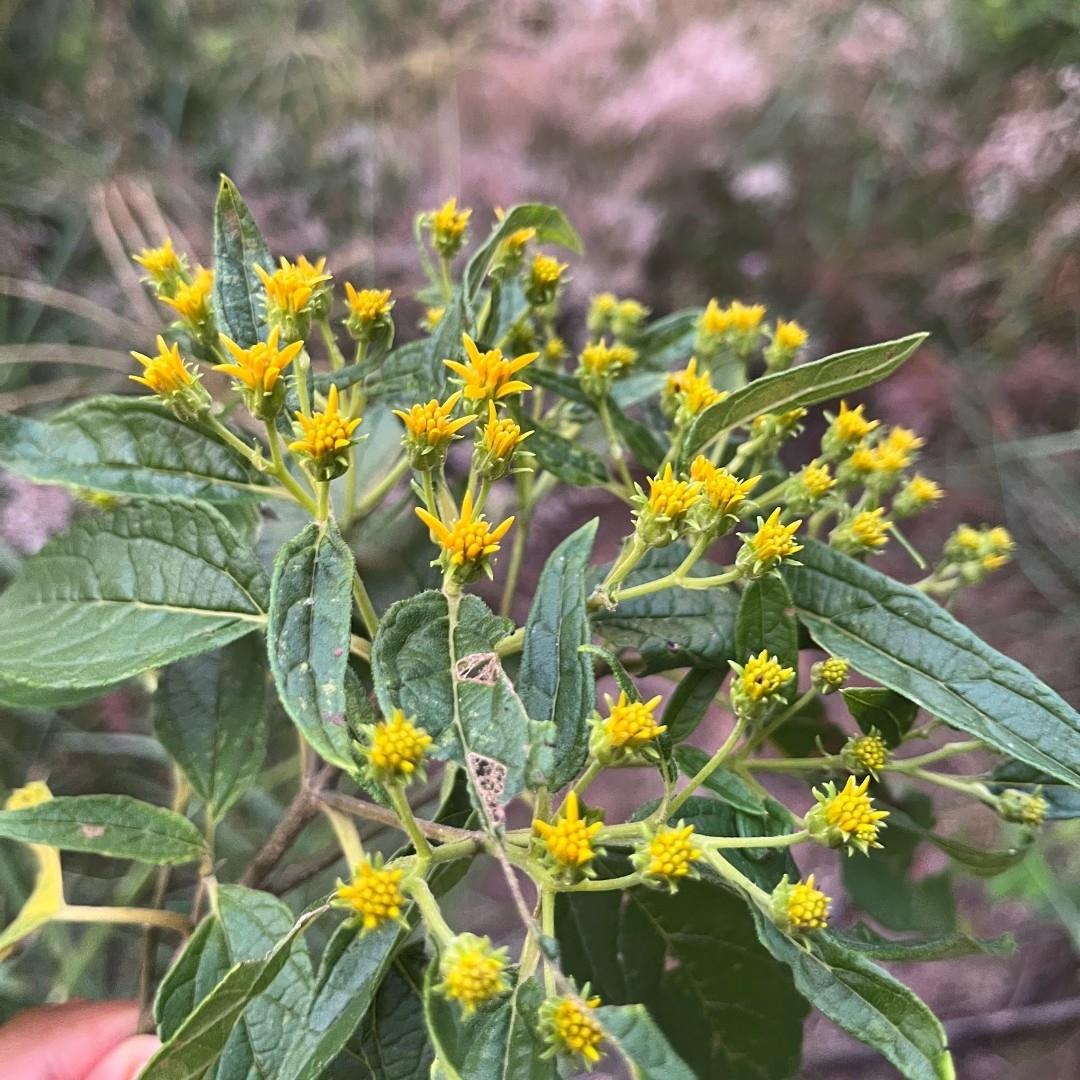
- Dendroviguiera quinqueradiata

Scientific classification
- Kingdom: Plantae
- Clade: Tracheophytes
- Clade: Angiosperms
- Clade: Eudicots
- Clade: Asterids
- Order: Asterales
- Family: Asteraceae
- Genus: Dendroviguiera; E.E.Schill. & Panero (2011)

Type species
- Dendroviguiera eriophora (Greenm.) E.E.Schill. & Panero

= Dendroviguiera =

Genus of flowering plants

Dendroviguiera is a genus of flowering plants in the sunflower family. Its native range stretches from Mexico into Central America. Its species were formerly part of the genus Viguiera, until a DNA study in 2011 separated out all the shrub/tree species.

== Description ==
Dendroviguiera species generally are shrubs and trees with phyllaries (modified leaves) with oblong, indurated (hardened) bases and short, triangular herbaceous apices (leaf-tips). The pappus (flowerhead) has awns (hair or bristle-like appendages) which are usually broad, greater than 3 mm (0.1 in) mm across. The abaxial (underneath) leaf surfaces usually not densely pubescent (downy; covered with short, soft hairs).

== Taxonomy ==
Originally the (woody) species of the genus Viguiera were placed in Viguiera ser. Maculatae S.F.Blake, Contr. Gray Herb. 54: 62. (1918) in 1918.

Molecular phylogenetic studies by Schilling in 1991, suggested that there is an unexpectedly close relationship between the genera Iostephane (Mexican flowering plants in the family Asteraceae) and Dendroviguiera (formerly Viguiera sect. Maculatae).

Botanists Edward E. Schilling and José Luis Panero used molecular sequences of nuclear ITS, ETS, and cpDNA to conclude that the genus Viguiera Kunth, did not constitute a monophyletic group. Among their conclusions they proposed to reclassify the genus, dividing and relocating its species in at least eleven genera: Aldama La Llave, Bahiopsis Kellogg, Calanticaria (B.L. Rob. & Greenm.) E.E. Schill. & Panero, Davilanthus E.E. Schill. & Panero, Dendroviguiera E.E. Schill. & Panero, Gonzalezia, Heliomeris Nutt., Heiseria E.E. Schill. & Panero, Hymenostephium Benth., Sidneya E.E. Schill. & Panero, and Viguiera Kunth.

The genus Dendroviguiera was first described and published in Bot. J. Linn. Soc. vol.167 on page 325 in 2011 by . After using plastid DNA sequence data for internal transcribed spacer (ITS) and partial external transcribed spacer (ETS) studies,

The genus name of Dendroviguiera is in honour of Louis Guillaume Alexandre Viguier (1790–1867), who was a French doctor and botanist, preceded by the Greek words dendron meaning 'tree'.

GRIN (United States Department of Agriculture and the Agricultural Research Service) only class it as a possible synonym of Viguiera Kunth and list no species.

== Species ==
As accepted by Kew, and WFO;

- Dendroviguiera adenophylla (S.F.Blake) E.E.Schill. & Panero
- Dendroviguiera eriophora (Greenm.) E.E.Schill. & Panero
- Dendroviguiera guerrerana (Panero & E.E.Schill.) E.E.Schill. & Panero
- Dendroviguiera insignis (Miranda) E.E.Schill. & Panero
- Dendroviguiera mirandae (Panero & E.E.Schill.) E.E.Schill. & Panero
- Dendroviguiera neocronquistii (B.L.Turner) E.E.Schill. & Panero
- Dendroviguiera oaxacana (Greenm.) E.E.Schill. & Panero
- Dendroviguiera pringlei (Fernald) E.E.Schill. & Panero
- Dendroviguiera puruana (Paray) E.E.Schill. & Panero
- Dendroviguiera quinqueradiata (Cav.) E.E.Schill. & Panero
- Dendroviguiera sharpii (Panero & E.E.Schill.) E.E.Schill. & Panero
- Dendroviguiera sphaerocephala (DC.) E.E.Schill. & Panero
- Dendroviguiera splendens (Panero & E.E.Schill.) E.E.Schill. & Panero
- Dendroviguiera sylvatica (Klatt) E.E.Schill. & Panero

== Distribution and habitat ==
Most of the species in the genus are found in Mexico, Only one species, Dendroviguiera sylvatica is only found in Costa Rica and Panama.

They are normally found in tropical deciduous forests. Dendroviguiera splendens is found within temperate forests, oak forests and subtropical dry shrublands and at altitudes of 1,600–2,300 m (5,200–7,500 ft) above sea level.

== Conservation ==
Found in Morelos, State of Mexico, Dendroviguiera mirandae on IUCN RED list as "least concern".

While Dendroviguiera splendens (Vara blanca) has been assessed for the IUCN Red List of Threatened Species in 2021 and was listed as vulnerable, due to threats from livestock farming & ranching and logging & wood harvesting, damaging the local habitats. While Dendroviguiera puruana, Dendroviguiera quinqueradiata and Dendroviguiera sphaerocephala have all been assessed as near threatened (NT) for similar reasons.

== Uses ==
Secondary metabolites (or organic compounds) such as germacrolides (GERM), heliangolides (HELI) and furanoheliangolides (FUHE) and tetracyclic diterpenes (TETD) have been characterized from various Dendroviguiera species.

Sesquiterpene lactones 52 and 96, were isolated from Dendroviguiera sylvatica have found to inhibited the nitric oxide production and phagocytosis of macrophages (Dupuy et al. 2008). They and millerenolide and thieleanin have also been used on the growth of melanoma tumors in mice (Taylor et al. 2008).
