= Calanticaria =

Scientific classification
- Kingdom: Plantae
- Clade: Tracheophytes
- Clade: Angiosperms
- Clade: Eudicots
- Clade: Asterids
- Order: Asterales
- Family: Asteraceae
- Subfamily: Asteroideae
- Tribe: Heliantheae
- Subtribe: Helianthinae
- Genus: Calanticaria (B.L.Rob. & Greenm.) E.E.Schill. & Panero

Genus of flowering plants

Calanticaria is a genus of flowering plants belonging to the family Asteraceae.

Its native range is eastern Mexico.

Botanists Schilling & Panero in 2002 and 2011, studied the subtribe Helianthinae based on molecular sequences of nuclear ITS, ETS, and cpDNA, coming to a conclusion that the genus Viguiera Kunth, did not constitute a monophyletic group. Among their conclusions they proposed to reclassify the genus, dividing and relocating its species in at least eleven genera: Aldama La Llave, Bahiopsis Kellogg, Calanticaria (B.L. Rob. & Greenm.) E.E. Schill. & Panero, Davilanthus E.E. Schill. & Panero, Dendroviguiera E.E. Schill. & Panero, Gonzalezia E.E. Schill. & Panero, Heiseria E.E. Schill. & Panero, Heliomeris Nutt., Hymenostephium Benth., Sidneya E.E. Schill. & Panero and Viguiera Kunth.

== Species ==
As accepted by Plants of the World Online;

- Calanticaria bicolor (S.F.Blake) E.E.Schill. & Panero
- Calanticaria brevifolia (Greenm.) E.E.Schill. & Panero
- Calanticaria greggii (A.Gray) E.E.Schill. & Panero
- Calanticaria inegii (S.González, M.González & Rzed.) E.E.Schill. & Panero
- Calanticaria oligantha (S.González, M.González & Rzed.) E.E.Schill. & Panero
