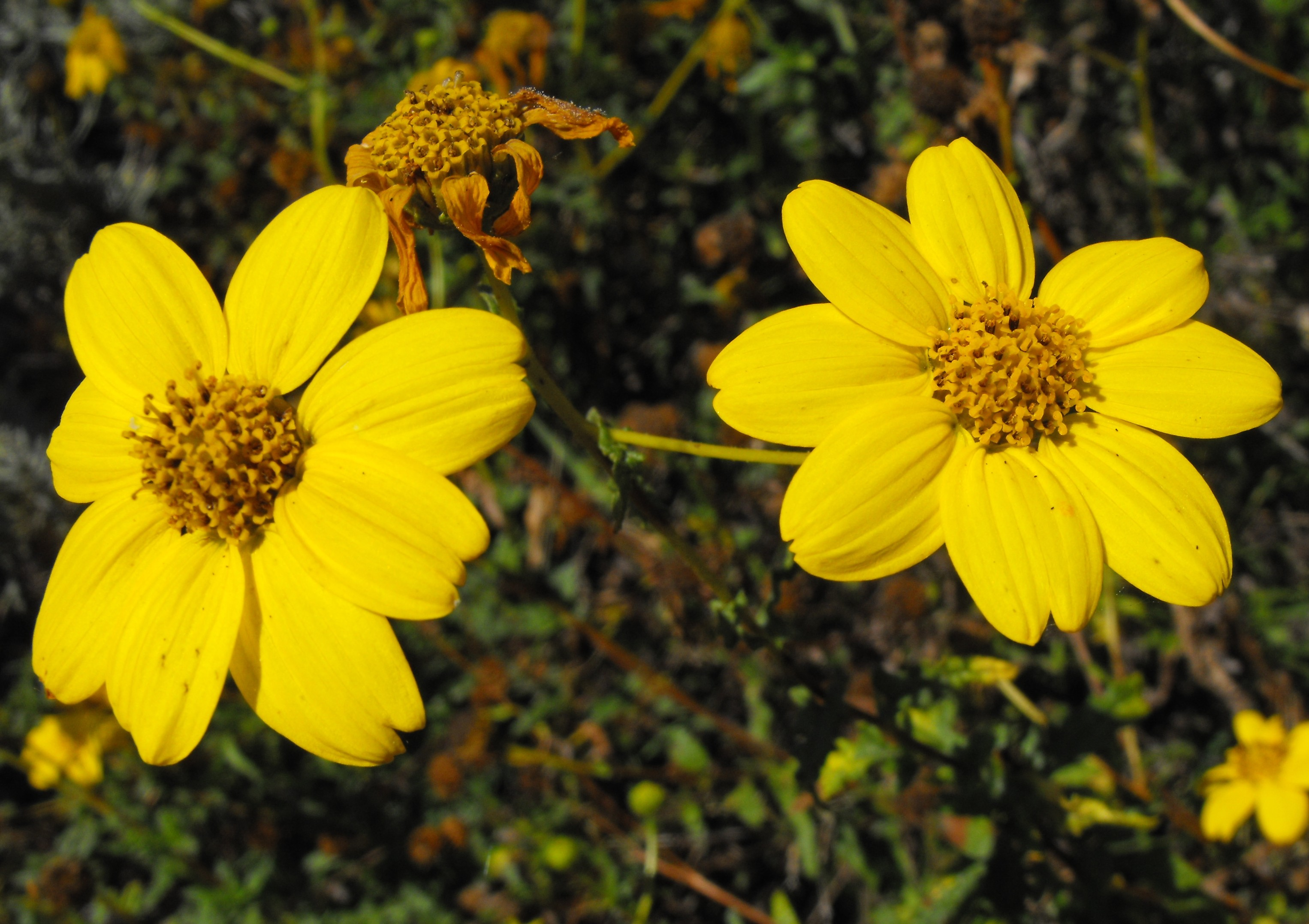
- Bahiopsis laciniata

Scientific classification
- Kingdom: Plantae
- Clade: Tracheophytes
- Clade: Angiosperms
- Clade: Eudicots
- Clade: Asterids
- Order: Asterales
- Family: Asteraceae
- Subfamily: Asteroideae
- Tribe: Heliantheae
- Subtribe: Helianthinae
- Genus: Bahiopsis; Kellogg

Type species
- Bahiopsis lanata Kellogg

Synonyms
- Viguiera sect. Bahiopsis (Kellogg) E.E.Schill.

= Bahiopsis =

Genus of flowering plants

Bahiopsis is a genus of North American flowering plants in the tribe Heliantheae within the family Asteraceae. It is native to the southwestern United States and northwestern Mexico, with several of the species endemic to the Baja California Peninsula (States of Baja California and Baja California Sur).

Botanists Schilling & Panero in 2002 and 2011, studied the subtribe Helianthinae based on molecular sequences of nuclear ITS, ETS, and cpDNA, coming to a conclusion that the genus Viguiera Kunth, did not constitute a monophyletic group. Among their conclusions they proposed to reclassify the genus, dividing and relocating its species in at least eleven genera: Aldama La Llave, Bahiopsis Kellogg, Calanticaria (B.L. Rob. & Greenm.) E.E. Schill. & Panero, Davilanthus E.E. Schill. & Panero, Dendroviguiera E.E. Schill. & Panero, Gonzalezia E.E. Schill. & Panero, Heiseria E.E. Schill. & Panero, Heliomeris Nutt., Hymenostephium Benth., Sidneya E.E. Schill. & Panero and Viguiera Kunth.

== Species ==
As accepted;

- Bahiopsis carterae (E.E.Schill.) E.E.Schill. & Panero - Baja California Sur
- Bahiopsis chenopodina (Greene) E.E.Schill. & Panero - Baja California Sur
- Bahiopsis laciniata (A.Gray ex A.Gray) E.E.Schill. & Panero - Baja California, California
- Bahiopsis microphylla (Vasey & Rose) E.E.Schill. & Panero - Baja California
- Bahiopsis parishii (Greene) E.E.Schill. & Panero - Baja California, Baja California Sur, Sonora, California, Nevada, Arizona, New Mexico
- Bahiopsis reticulata (S.Watson) E.E.Schill. & Panero - Nevada (Nye Co), California (Inyo + San Bernardino Cos)
- Bahiopsis subincisa (Benth.) E.E.Schill. & Panero - Baja California Sur
- Bahiopsis tomentosa (A.Gray) E.E.Schill. & Panero - Baja California Sur
- Bahiopsis triangularis (M.E.Jones) E.E.Schill. & Panero - Baja California, Baja California Sur, Sonora
