= Calligrapha continua =

Scientific classification
- Kingdom: Animalia
- Phylum: Arthropoda
- Clade: Pancrustacea
- Class: Insecta
- Order: Coleoptera
- Suborder: Polyphaga
- Infraorder: Cucujiformia
- Family: Chrysomelidae
- Subfamily: Chrysomelinae
- Tribe: Chrysomelini
- Genus: Calligrapha
- Species: C. continua

Binomial name
- Calligrapha continua (J. L. LeConte, 1868)

Species of beetle

Calligrapha continua is a species of leaf beetle belonging to the family Chrysomelidae, in the subgenus Zygogramma, which was formerly a genus.

== Description ==
C. continua is a small leaf beetle with an orange-brown head and orange-brown pronotum, mottled with yellow at the frontal end. The elytra are pale white or yellow and marked with four continuous, elongated brown stripes. The suture is also brown.

== Distribution and habitat ==
C. continua is native to North America, Canada, and Mexico. Both adults and larvae are associated with the false sunflower species showy goldeneye (Heliomeris multiflora).
