= Heiseria =

Scientific classification
- Kingdom: Plantae
- Clade: Tracheophytes
- Clade: Angiosperms
- Clade: Eudicots
- Clade: Asterids
- Order: Asterales
- Family: Asteraceae
- Genus: Heiseria; E.E.Schill. & Panero

Genus of plants

Heiseria is a genus of flowering plants belonging to the family Asteraceae.

It is native to Peru.

Botanists Edward E. Schilling and José L. Panero used molecular sequences of nuclear ITS, ETS, and cpDNA to conclude that the genus Viguiera Kunth, did not constitute a monophyletic group. Among their conclusions they proposed to reclassify the genus, dividing and relocating its species in at least eleven genera: Aldama La Llave, Bahiopsis Kellogg, Calanticaria (B.L. Rob. & Greenm.) E.E. Schill. & Panero, Davilanthus E.E. Schill. & Panero, Dendroviguiera E.E. Schill. & Panero, Gonzalezia, Heliomeris Nutt., Heiseria E.E. Schill. & Panero, Hymenostephium Benth., Sidneya E.E. Schill. & Panero, and Viguiera Kunth.

The genus name of Heiseria is in honour of Charles Bixler Heiser (1920–2010), an American professor of botany. It was first described and published in Bot. J. Linn. Soc. Vol.167 on page 327 in 2011.

Known species, according to Kew:

- Heiseria irmscheriana (Bruns) Mesfin
- Heiseria pusilla (A.Gray) E.E.Schill. & Panero
- Heiseria simsioides (S.F.Blake) E.E.Schill. & Panero
