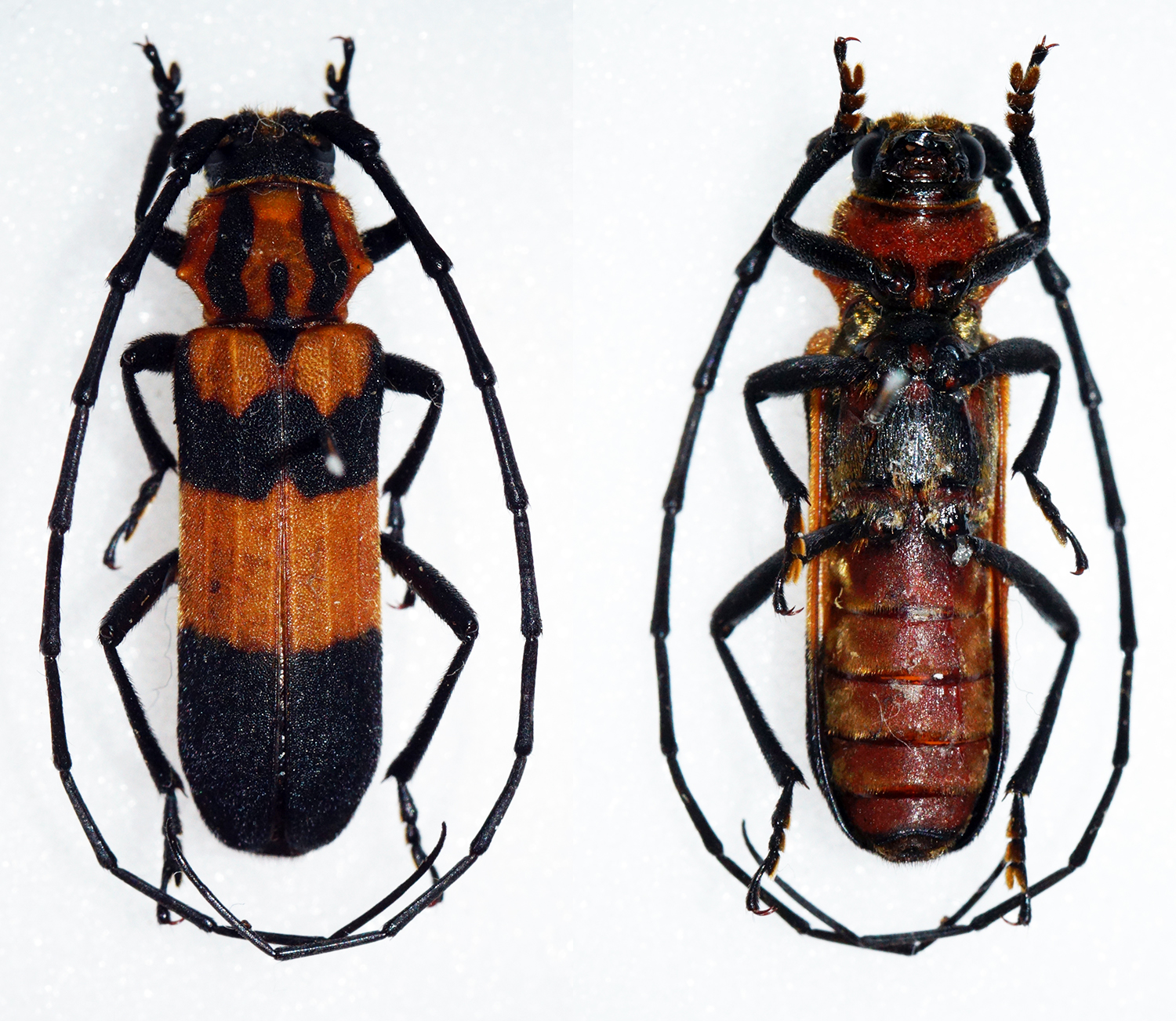

Scientific classification
- Kingdom: Animalia
- Phylum: Arthropoda
- Clade: Pancrustacea
- Class: Insecta
- Order: Coleoptera
- Suborder: Polyphaga
- Infraorder: Cucujiformia
- Family: Cerambycidae
- Genus: Parevander
- Species: P. xanthomelas

Binomial name
- Parevander xanthomelas (Guérin-Méneville, 1844) Aurivillius, 1912

Synonyms
- Amphidesmus xanthomelas Guérin-Méneville, 1844; Evander xanthomelas Bates, 1880

= Parevander xanthomelas =

Species of beetle

Parevander xanthomelas is a species of beetle in the family Cerambycidae. It was described by Félix Édouard Guérin-Méneville in 1844, and has been classified in the genus Parevander since the circumscription of that genus by Per Olof Christopher Aurivillius in 1912.

== Range ==
Its type locality was described as "the interior of Mexico"; Auguste Sallé and Edward Palmer later obtained specimens in Izúcar, Puebla and Monclova, Coahuila, respectively. It's also been observed in the state of Jalisco in both San Buenaventura and in Chamela. as well as in the states of Chiapas, Morelos, Guerrero, and Oaxaca. Earle Gorton Linsley reported the species was "rather common in Southern and Central Mexico."

In Guatemala, it was found in Morazán, El Progreso (Note: Bates recorded the location as Tocoy, Guatemala; the city of Tocoy Tzimá changed its name to Morazán 1887.) by George Charles Champion. Its habitat also includes Guanacaste, Costa Rica. Its range in Honduras includes the Francisco Morazán Department. In Texas, it has been found in Hidalgo and Starr Counties in the Rio Grande Valley. George Henry Horn noted there were specimens in the Jardin des plantes which were collected in Southern California.

== Relationship with plants ==
It has been observed on flowers of Viguiera stenoloba, Tithonia sp., Tithonia rotundifolia, Cosmos sulphureus, Viguiera dentata, and Montanoa sp. Its larvae eat the roots of Lantana camara. In 1902, there was an unsuccessful attempt to use P. xanthomelas as a biological control agent to combat L. camara in Hawaii, where it's an invasive species. It is not established in Hawaii.
