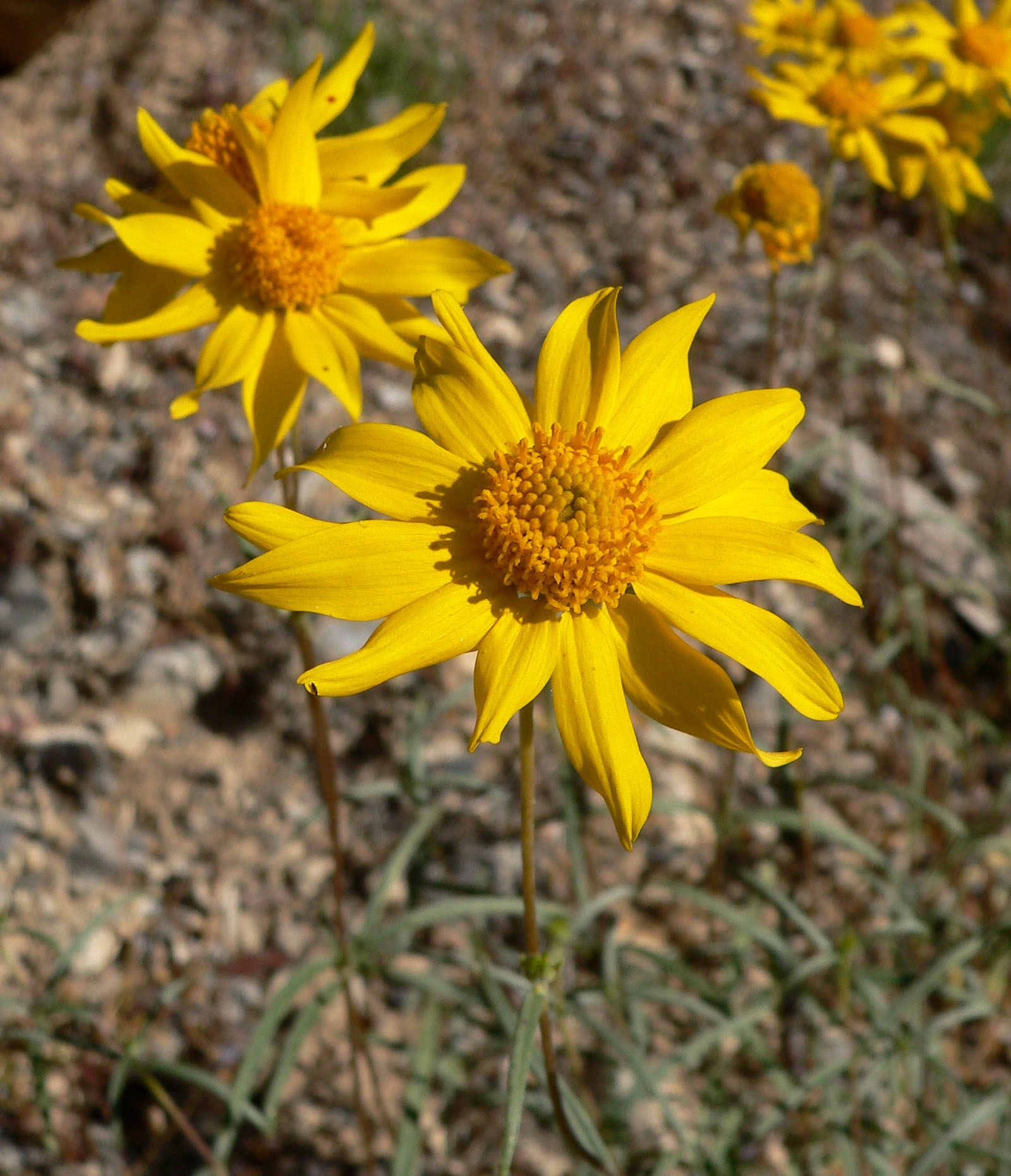
- Heliomeris multiflora var. nevadensis

Scientific classification
- Kingdom: Plantae
- Clade: Embryophytes
- Clade: Tracheophytes
- Clade: Angiosperms
- Clade: Eudicots
- Clade: Asterids
- Order: Asterales
- Family: Asteraceae
- Subfamily: Asteroideae
- Tribe: Heliantheae
- Subtribe: Helianthinae
- Genus: Heliomeris; Nutt. 1848

Synonyms
- Viguiera sect. Heliomeris (Nutt.) S.F.Blake

= Heliomeris =

Genus of plants

Heliomeris is a genus of flowering plants in the family Asteraceae, known generally as false goldeneyes.

They are native to the western United States and northern Mexico. One species, H. obscura, is separated from the others, endemic to a remote area on the border between the Mexican states of Puebla and Oaxaca.

These are annual and perennial herbs producing sunflower-like radiate flower heads. They are distinguished from related genera by the achenes, which are glabrous and lack a pappus, and by the involucre, which consists of only 2 series of bracts.

Botanists Schilling & Panero in 2002 and 2011, studied the subtribe Helianthinae based on molecular sequences of nuclear ITS, ETS, and cpDNA, coming to a conclusion that the genus Viguiera Kunth, did not constitute a monophyletic group. Among their conclusions they proposed to reclassify the genus, dividing and relocating its species in at least other nine genera: Aldama La Llave, Bahiopsis Kellogg, Calanticaria (B.L. Rob. & Greenm.) E.E. Schill. & Panero, Davilanthus E.E. Schill. & Panero, Dendroviguiera E.E. Schill. & Panero, Gonzalezia E.E. Schill. & Panero, Heiseria E.E. Schill. & Panero, Heliomeris Nutt., Hymenostephium Benth., Sidneya E.E. Schill. & Panero and Viguiera Kunth.

== Species ==
As accepted;

- Heliomeris hispida - rough false goldeneye, hairy goldeneye - Sonora, Arizona, New Mexico, California, Utah
- Heliomeris longifolia - longleaf false goldeneye - Sonora, Chihuahua, Durango, Jalisco, San Luis Potosí, Michoacán, Chiapas, Arizona, New Mexico, Texas, Colorado, Utah, Nevada
- Heliomeris multiflora - showy goldeneye - from San Luis Potosí + southern California to Montana
- Heliomeris obscura - Puebla, Oaxaca
- Heliomeris soliceps - tropical false goldeneye, paria sunflower - Kane County in Utah
