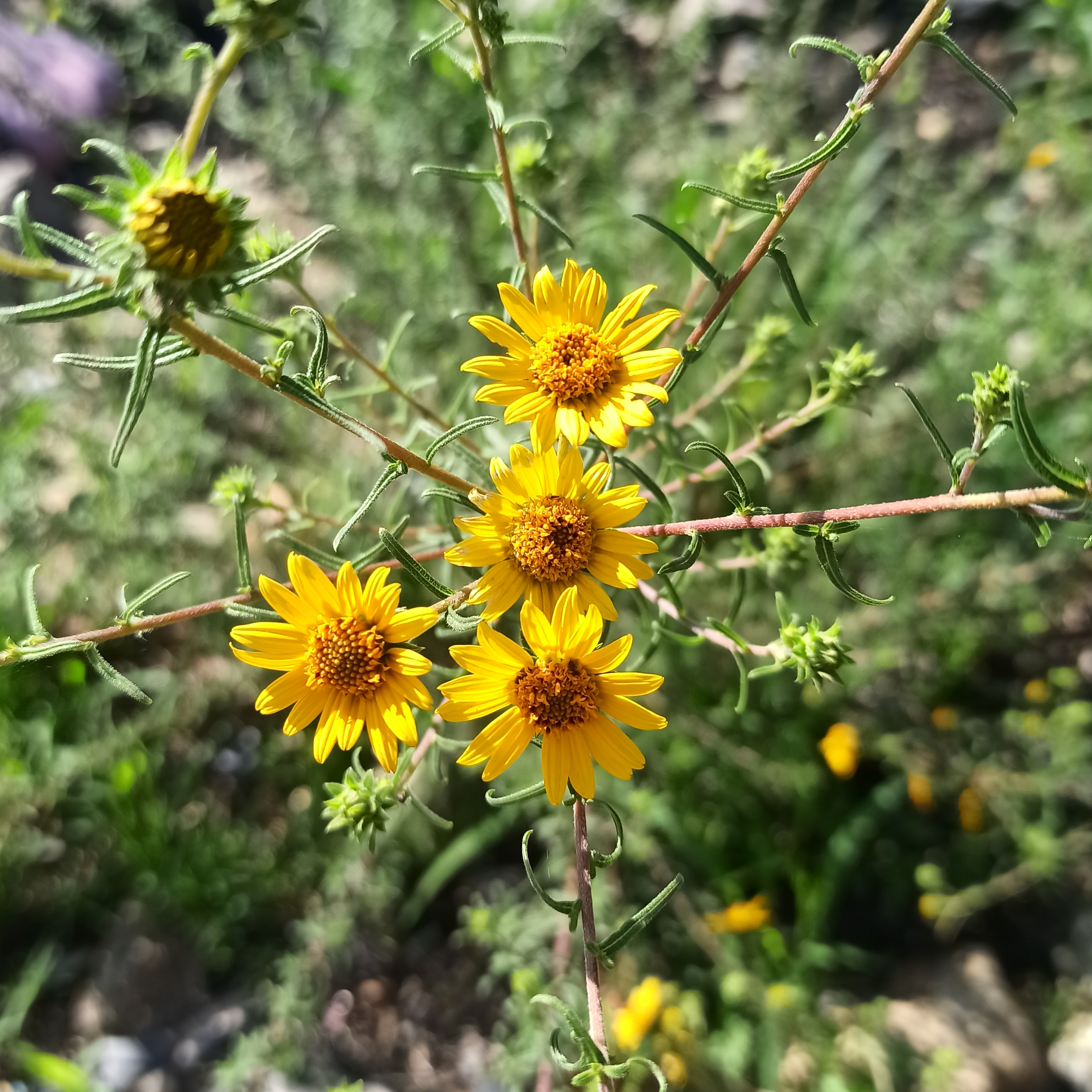
- Aldama linearis

Scientific classification
- Kingdom: Plantae
- Clade: Tracheophytes
- Clade: Angiosperms
- Clade: Eudicots
- Clade: Asterids
- Order: Asterales
- Family: Asteraceae
- Subfamily: Asteroideae
- Tribe: Heliantheae
- Subtribe: Helianthinae
- Genus: Aldama; La Llave

Type species
- Aldama dentata La Llave

Synonyms
- List: Agiabampoa Rose ex O.Hoffm. in Syst. Compos.: 20 (1894); Alvordia Brandegee in Proc. Calif. Acad. Sci., ser. 2, 2: 174 (1889); Dichotoma Sch.Bip. ex Benth. & Hook.f. in Gen. Pl. 2: 364 (1873); Rhysolepis S.F.Blake in Contr. Gray Herb. 52: 36 (1917); Stuessya B.L.Turner & F.G.Davies in Brittonia 32: 209 (1980)

= Aldama (plant) =

Genus of flowering plants

Aldama is a genus of flowering plants in the family Asteraceae. The native range of this genus is tropical & sub-tropical America. The genus was originally described to include one (later two) species of subtribe Helianthinae that were characterized by having pales that tightly enclosed the cypselae (achenes) (see Feddema, 1971).

It was first published and described in P.de La Llave & J.M.de Lexarza, Nov. Veg. Descr. 1: 14 in 1824.

Aldama is currently, characterized by having a perennial herbaceous habit, a pappus usually of awns and scales, and a multi-seriate involucre.

Botanists Schilling & Panero in 2002 and 2011, studied the subtribe Helianthinae based on molecular sequences of nuclear ITS, ETS, and cpDNA, coming to a conclusion that the genus Viguiera Kunth, did not constitute a monophyletic group. Among their conclusions they proposed to reclassify the genus, dividing and relocating its species in at least eleven genera: Aldama La Llave, Bahiopsis Kellogg, Calanticaria (B.L. Rob. & Greenm.) E.E. Schill. & Panero, Davilanthus E.E. Schill. & Panero, Dendroviguiera E.E. Schill. & Panero, Gonzalezia E.E. Schill. & Panero, Heiseria E.E. Schill. & Panero, Heliomeris Nutt., Hymenostephium Benth., Sidneya E.E. Schill. & Panero and Viguiera Kunth. So Aldama has been expanded to include a total of 115-118 species.

== Distribution ==
It is native to (countries of): Argentina, Belize, Bolivia, Brazil, northern and central Chile, Ecuador, Guatemala, Honduras, Mexico, Nicaragua, Paraguay, Peru, Uruguay, United States (in the states of Arizona, New Mexico and Texas) and Venezuela.
