= Gonzalezia =

Gonzalezia may refer to:

- Gonzalezia (wasp), a genus of wasps in the family Encyrtidae
- Gonzalezia (plant), a genus of plants in the family Asteraceae
