= Pappobolus sanchezii =

Conservation status
- Vulnerable (IUCN 2.3)

Scientific classification
- Kingdom: Plantae
- Clade: Tracheophytes
- Clade: Angiosperms
- Clade: Eudicots
- Clade: Asterids
- Order: Asterales
- Family: Asteraceae
- Tribe: Heliantheae
- Genus: Pappobolus
- Species: P. sanchezii

Binomial name
- Pappobolus sanchezii Panero

Species of plant

Pappobolus sanchezii is a species of flowering plant in the family Asteraceae. It is found only in Peru.
