= Gonzalezia (plant) =

Scientific classification
- Kingdom: Plantae
- Clade: Tracheophytes
- Clade: Angiosperms
- Clade: Eudicots
- Clade: Asterids
- Order: Asterales
- Family: Asteraceae
- Genus: Gonzalezia; E.E.Schill. & Panero

Genus of plants

Gonzalezia is a genus of flowering plants belonging to the family Asteraceae.

Its native range is northern and western Mexico.

Botanists Schilling & Panero used molecular sequences of nuclear ITS, ETS, and cpDNA, to conclude that the genus Viguiera Kunth, did not constitute a monophyletic group. Among their conclusions they proposed to reclassify the genus, dividing its species into at least eleven genera: Aldama La Llave, Bahiopsis Kellogg, Calanticaria (B.L. Rob. & Greenm.) E.E. Schill. & Panero, Davilanthus E.E. Schill. & Panero, Dendroviguiera E.E. Schill. & Panero, Gonzalezia E.E. Schill. & Panero, Heiseria E.E. Schill. & Panero, Heliomeris Nutt., Hymenostephium Benth., Sidneya E.E. Schill. & Panero and Viguiera Kunth.

The genus name of Gonzalezia is in honour of María del Socorro González Elizondo (b. 1953), a Mexican plant taxonomist with a focus on Cyperaceae. It was first described and published by botanists Edward E. Schilling and José Luis Panero in Bot. J. Linn. Soc. Vol.167 on page 326 in 2011.

Known species, according to Kew;

- Gonzalezia decurrens (A.Gray) E.E.Schill. & Panero
- Gonzalezia hypargyrea (Greenm.) E.E.Schill. & Panero
- Gonzalezia rosei (Greenm.) E.E.Schill. & Panero
