= Heliomeris obscura =

Scientific classification
- Kingdom: Plantae
- Clade: Tracheophytes
- Clade: Angiosperms
- Clade: Eudicots
- Clade: Asterids
- Order: Asterales
- Family: Asteraceae
- Genus: Heliomeris
- Species: H. obscura

Binomial name
- Heliomeris obscura (S.F.Blake) Cockerell 1918

Synonyms
- Gymnolomia obscura S.F. Blake 1916; Viguiera obscura (S.F. Blake) S.F. Blake

Species of flowering plant

Heliomeris obscura is a rare Mexican species of flowering plants in the family Asteraceae. It has been found only in a remote area of dry shrublands in eastern Mexico, in the states of Puebla and Veracruz.

Heliomeris obscura is an annual herb up to 50 cm (20 in) tall, with a large taproot. It is similar to H. multiflora in several respects, but has very different leaves, broadly egg-shaped or triangular.
