= Parevander nietii =

Scientific classification
- Kingdom: Animalia
- Phylum: Arthropoda
- Clade: Pancrustacea
- Class: Insecta
- Order: Coleoptera
- Suborder: Polyphaga
- Infraorder: Cucujiformia
- Family: Cerambycidae
- Genus: Parevander
- Species: P. nietii

Binomial name
- Parevander nietii (Guérin-Méneville, 1844)

Species of beetle

Parevander nietii is a species of beetle in the family Cerambycidae. It was described by Félix Édouard Guérin-Méneville in 1844.
