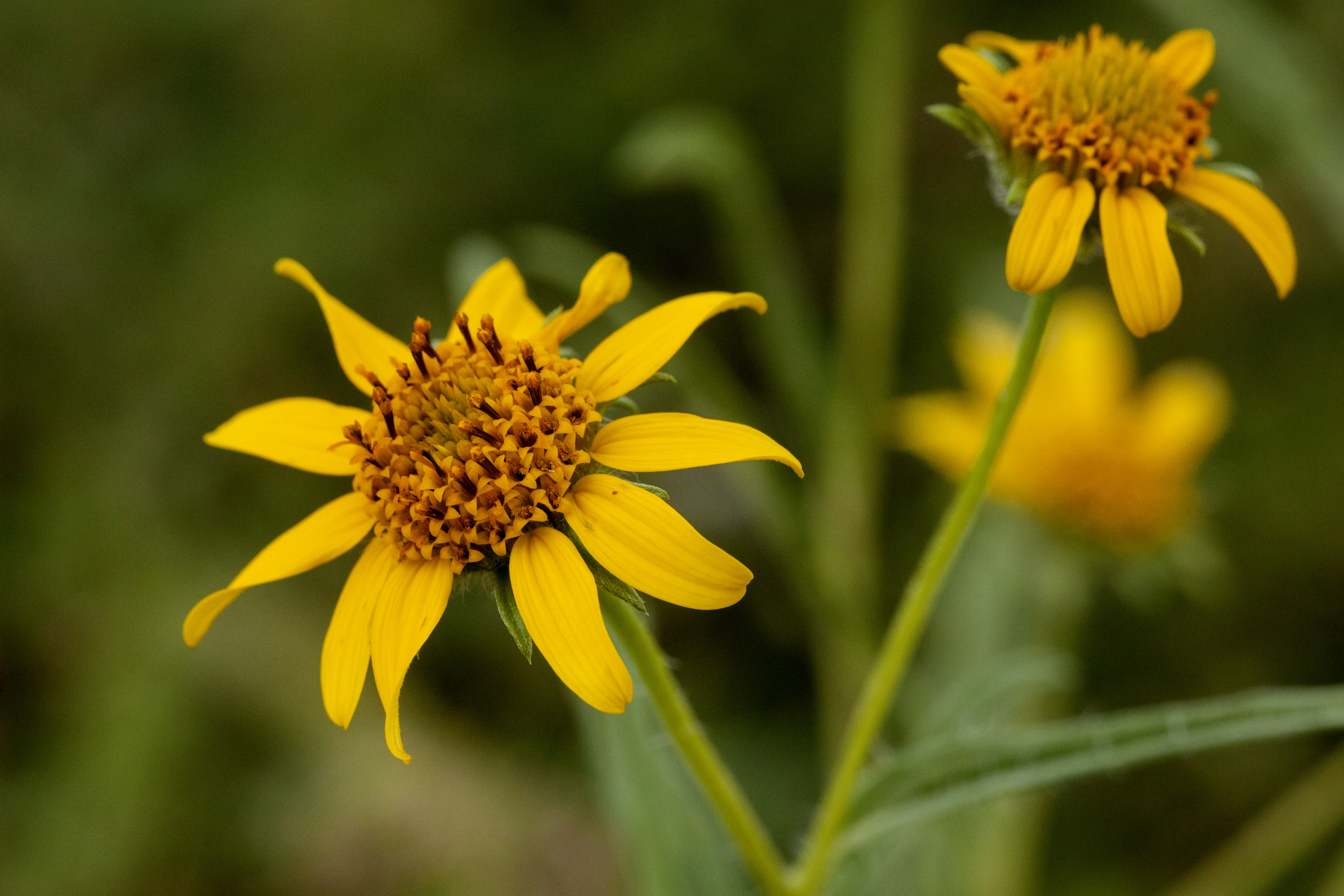

Scientific classification
- Kingdom: Plantae
- Clade: Tracheophytes
- Clade: Angiosperms
- Clade: Eudicots
- Clade: Asterids
- Order: Asterales
- Family: Asteraceae
- Genus: Heliomeris
- Species: H. hispida

Binomial name
- Heliomeris hispida (A.Gray) Cockerell 1918

Synonyms
- Heliomeris hispidus (A.Gray) Cockerell 1918; Heliomeris multiflora var. hispida A. Gray 1853; Gymnolomia hispida (A. Gray) B.L. Rob. & Greenm.; Viguiera ciliata var. hispida (A. Gray) S.F. Blake

= Heliomeris hispida =

Species of plant

Heliomeris hispida is a North American species of flowering plants in the family Asteraceae called the hairy goldeneye or rough false goldeneye. It is native to the southwestern United States (Arizona, New Mexico, Utah) and also to the northern Sierra Madre Occidental of western Chihuahua and eastern Sonora in Mexico. There are a few reports of the species growing in California, but these are most likely introduced populations.

Heliomeris hispida is an annual herb up to 90 cm (3 feet) tall, with a large taproot. One plant can produce 1-15 flower heads, each head with 9-15 ray flowers surrounding 50 or more tiny disc flowers. The species prefers saline marshes and meadows in mountainous areas.
