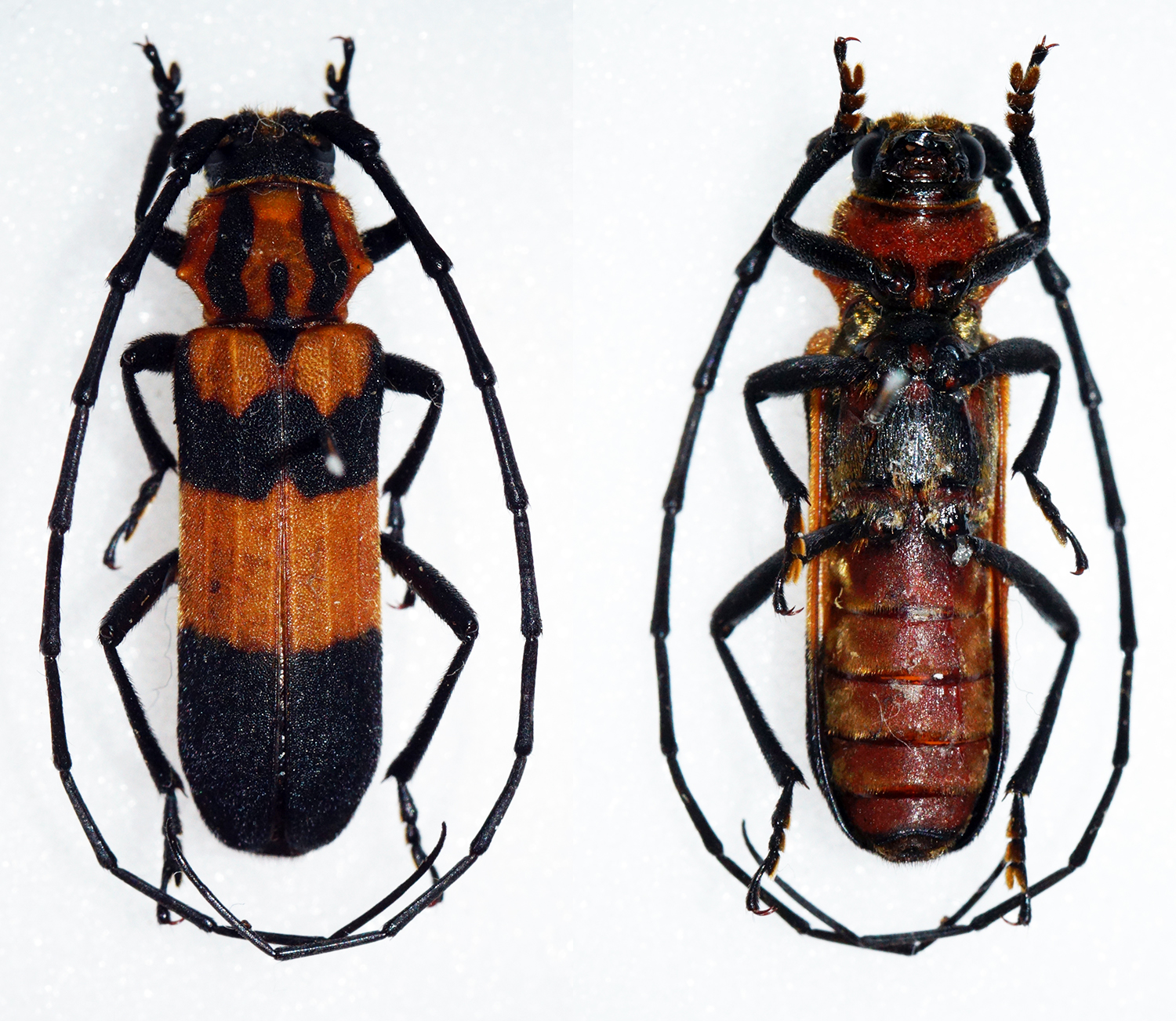
- Parevander xanthomelas

Scientific classification
- Domain: Eukaryota
- Kingdom: Animalia
- Phylum: Arthropoda
- Class: Insecta
- Order: Coleoptera
- Suborder: Polyphaga
- Infraorder: Cucujiformia
- Family: Cerambycidae
- Subfamily: Cerambycinae
- Tribe: Trachyderini
- Genus: Parevander; Aurivillius, 1912

= Parevander =

Genus of beetles

Parevander is a genus of beetles in the family Cerambycidae, containing the following species:

- Parevander hovorei Giesbert in Giesbert and Penrose, 1984
- Parevander nietii (Guérin-Méneville, 1844)
- Parevander nobilis (Bates, 1872)
- Parevander unicolor (Bates, 1880)
- Parevander xanthomelas (Guérin-Méneville, 1844)
