= Heliomeris soliceps =

Scientific classification
- Kingdom: Plantae
- Clade: Embryophytes
- Clade: Tracheophytes
- Clade: Angiosperms
- Clade: Eudicots
- Clade: Asterids
- Order: Asterales
- Family: Asteraceae
- Tribe: Heliantheae
- Genus: Heliomeris
- Species: H. soliceps

Binomial name
- Heliomeris soliceps (Barneby) W.F.Yates

Synonyms
- Viguiera soliceps Barneby 1966

Species of flowering plant

Heliomeris soliceps is a rare North American species of flowering plants in the family Asteraceae called the tropical false goldeneye or paria sunflower. It has been found only in the state of Utah in the southwestern United States. It has a very restricted range in only one county (Kane County) in the southern part of the state, although it forms large, extensive populations within that small region.

Heliomeris soliceps is an annual herb up to 40 cm (16 in) tall, with a large taproot. Leaves are up to 38 mm (1.5 cm) long, with hairs along the edges. One plant can produce 3-15 yellow flower heads, each head with 10-12 ray flowers surrounding 40 or more tiny disc flowers.
