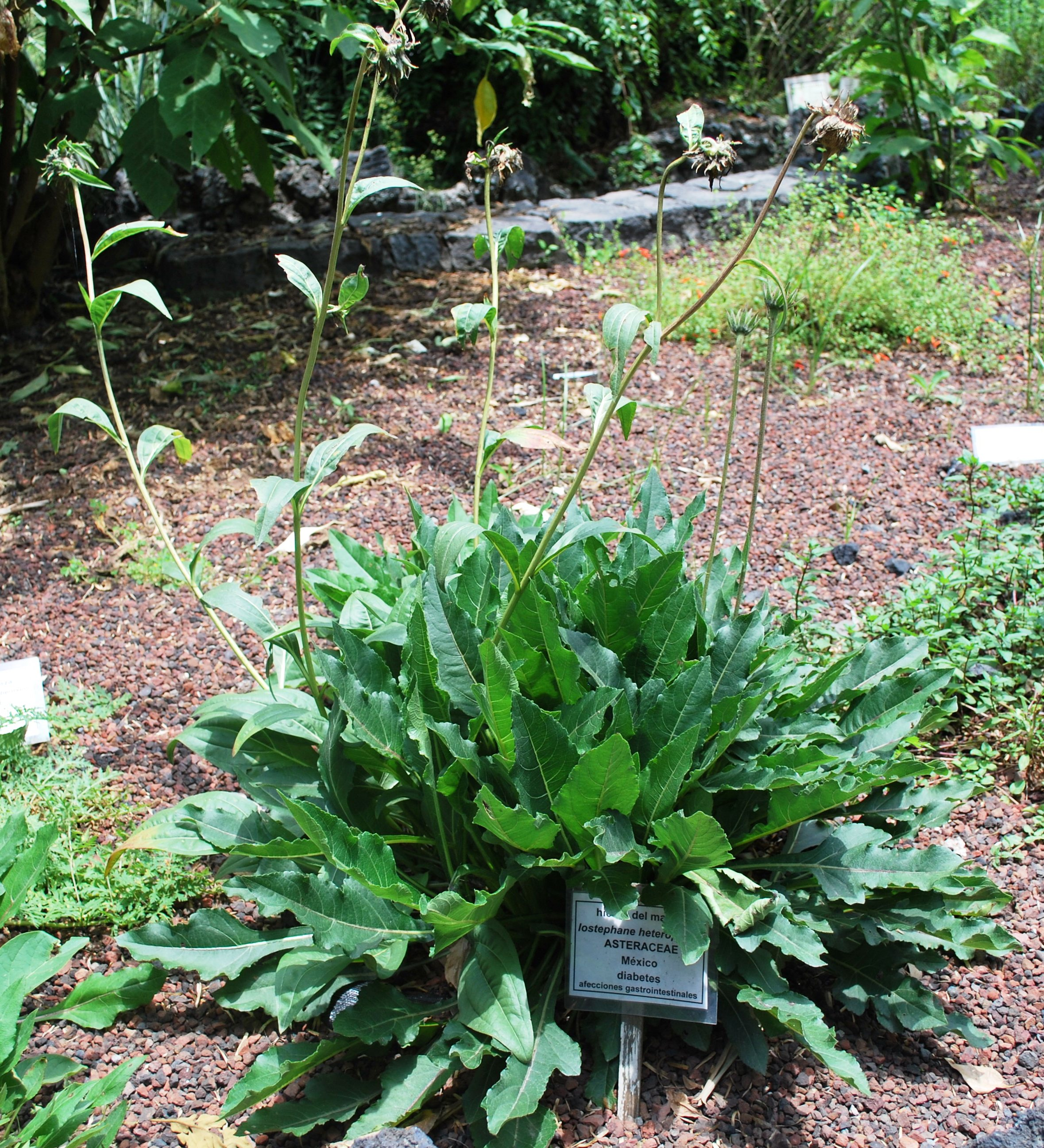

Scientific classification
- Kingdom: Plantae
- Clade: Embryophytes
- Clade: Tracheophytes
- Clade: Angiosperms
- Clade: Eudicots
- Clade: Asterids
- Order: Asterales
- Family: Asteraceae
- Tribe: Heliantheae
- Genus: Iostephane
- Species: I. heterophylla

Binomial name
- Iostephane heterophylla (Cav.) Benth. (1873)

Synonyms
- Brauneria heterophylla (D.Don) A.Lyons; Coreopsis heterophylla Cav.; Echinacea dubia Knowles & Westc.; Echinacea heterophylla (Cav.) D.Don ex D.Don; Echinacea napifolia Sweet; Iostephane heterophylla var. heterophylla; Rudbeckia napifolia Kunth

= Iostephane heterophylla =

Species of flowering plant

Iostephane heterophylla is a species of rosette-forming herbaceous perennials that produce heads of purple flowers. It is found across southwest Mexico, from Chihuahua to Oaxaca.
