= Hymenostephium rivularis =

Scientific classification
- Kingdom: Plantae
- Clade: Tracheophytes
- Clade: Angiosperms
- Clade: Eudicots
- Clade: Asterids
- Order: Asterales
- Family: Asteraceae
- Genus: Hymenostephium
- Species: H. rivularis

Binomial name
- Hymenostephium rivularis (Poepp.) E.E.Schill. & Panero

Synonyms
- Garcilassa rivularis Poepp.; Hymenostephium rivulare (Poepp.) E.E.Schill. & Panero

Species of flowering plant

Hymenostephium rivularis is a species of flowering plants in the family Asteraceae. It is native to Central America and western South America (Colombia, Ecuador, Peru, Bolivia)
