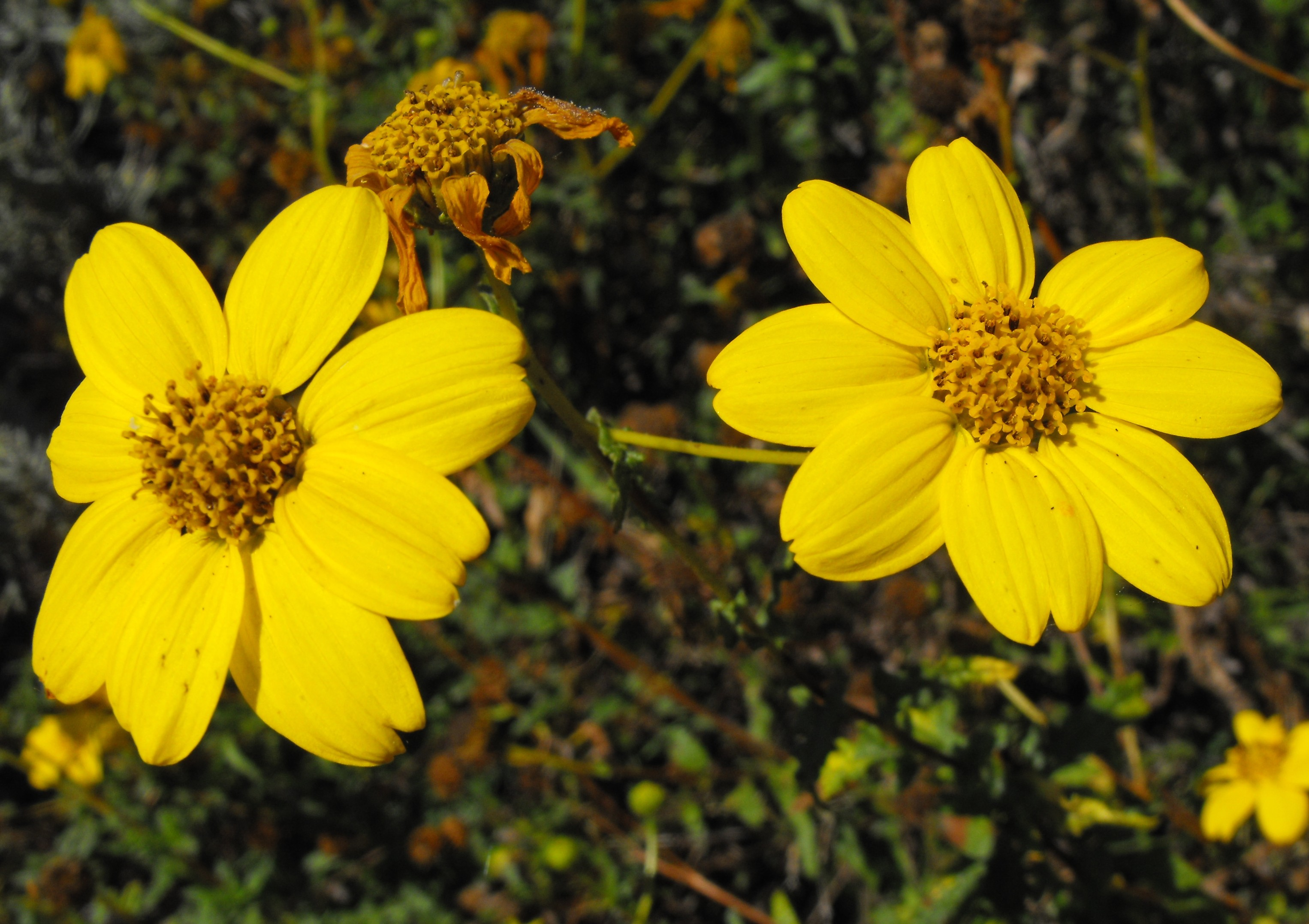

Scientific classification
- Kingdom: Plantae
- Clade: Tracheophytes
- Clade: Angiosperms
- Clade: Eudicots
- Clade: Asterids
- Order: Asterales
- Family: Asteraceae
- Genus: Bahiopsis
- Species: B. laciniata

Binomial name
- Bahiopsis laciniata (A.Gray) E.E.Schill. & Panero

Synonyms
- Viguiera laciniata A.Gray

= Bahiopsis laciniata =

Species of flowering plant

Bahiopsis laciniata is a species of flowering plant in the family Asteraceae known by the common names San Diego County sunflower, San Diego viguiera and tornleaf goldeneye. It is native to the deserts and dry mountain slopes of northwestern Mexico (States of Sonora and Baja California), its distribution extending north as far as Ventura County, California.

The habitat of Bahiopsis laciniata includes chaparral and coastal sage scrub. It is a hairy, resinous shrub growing to a maximum height well over one meter. The leaves have lance-shaped blades up to 5 centimeters long which are glandular and shiny with resin. The blades have smooth or shallowly toothed edges which are sometimes rolled under or crinkled. The inflorescence is a solitary sunflower-like flower head or cyme of several heads. The flower head has several yellow ray florets measuring 6 millimeters to over a centimeter long. The fruit is an achene tipped with a pappus.
