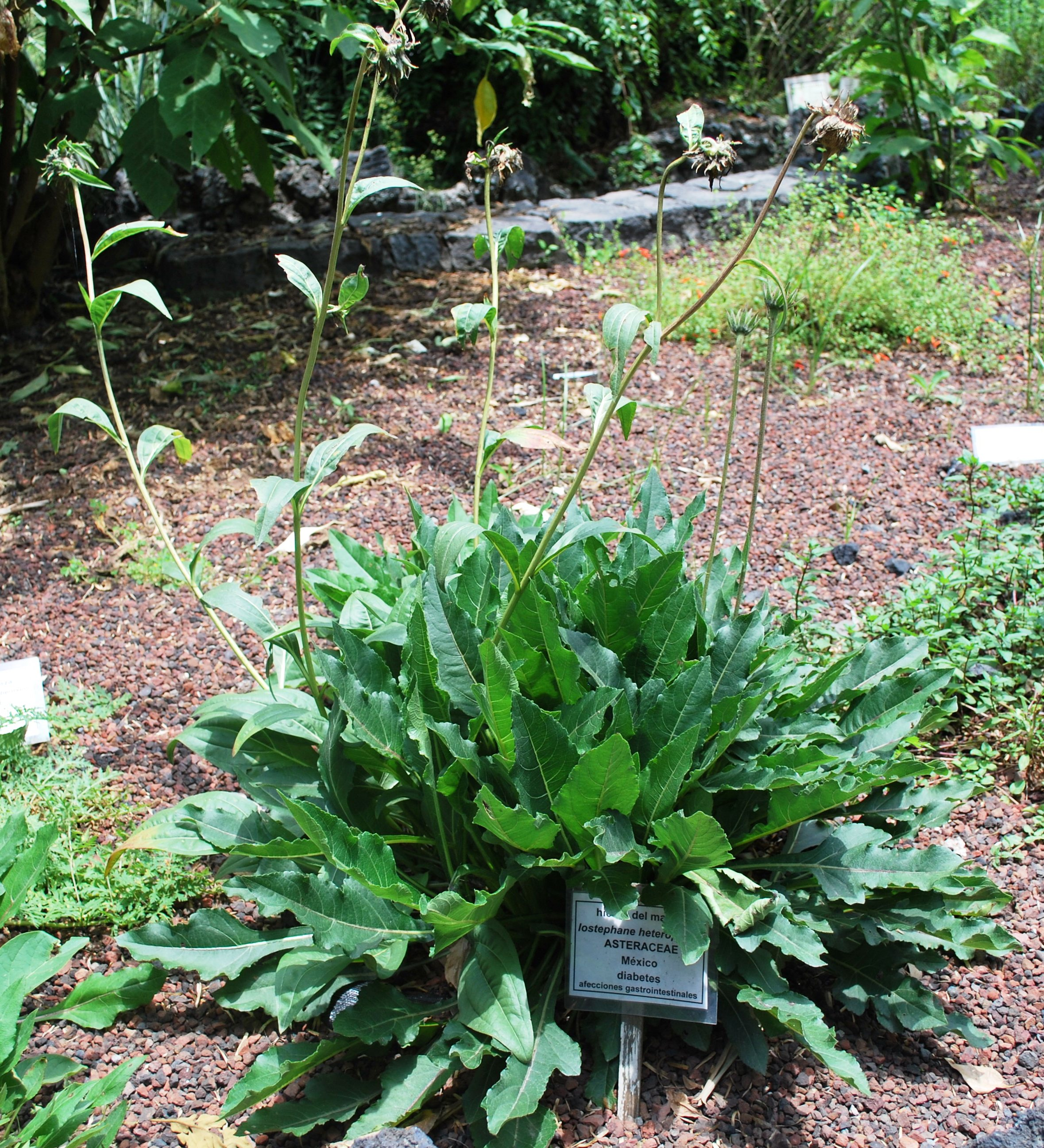
- Iostephane heterophylla

Scientific classification
- Kingdom: Plantae
- Clade: Tracheophytes
- Clade: Angiosperms
- Clade: Eudicots
- Clade: Asterids
- Order: Asterales
- Family: Asteraceae
- Subfamily: Asteroideae
- Tribe: Heliantheae
- Subtribe: Helianthinae
- Genus: Iostephane; Benth.

Type species
- Iostephane heterophylla (Cav.) Benth.

Synonyms
- Pionocarpus S.F.Blake in Proc. Amer. Acad. Arts 51: 521 (1916)

= Iostephane =

Genus of flowering plants

Iostephane is a genus of Mexican flowering plants in the family Asteraceae. They were first published in G.Bentham & J.D.Hooker, Genera Plantarum Vol.2 on page 368 in 1873.

The species are rosette-forming herbaceous perennials that produce relatively large heads with yellow or purple (I. heterophylla) rays. They have large, somewhat quadrate cypselae (achenes), that may either have or lack a pappus.

Molecular phylogenetic studies by Schilling in 1991, suggested that there is an unexpectedly close relationship between Iostephane and Dendroviguiera (formerly Viguiera sect. Maculatae), a genus of shrubs and trees that is also endemic to Mexico.

== Species ==
As accepted by Plants of the World Online, and Global Compositae Checklist;

- Iostephane heterophylla (Cav.) Benth. – widespread from Chihuahua to Oaxaca
- Iostephane madrensis (S.Wats.) Strother – Chihuahua
- Iostephane papposa J. J. Fay – Oaxaca
- Iostephane trilobata Hemsl. – Chiapas, Oaxaca, Puebla, México State
