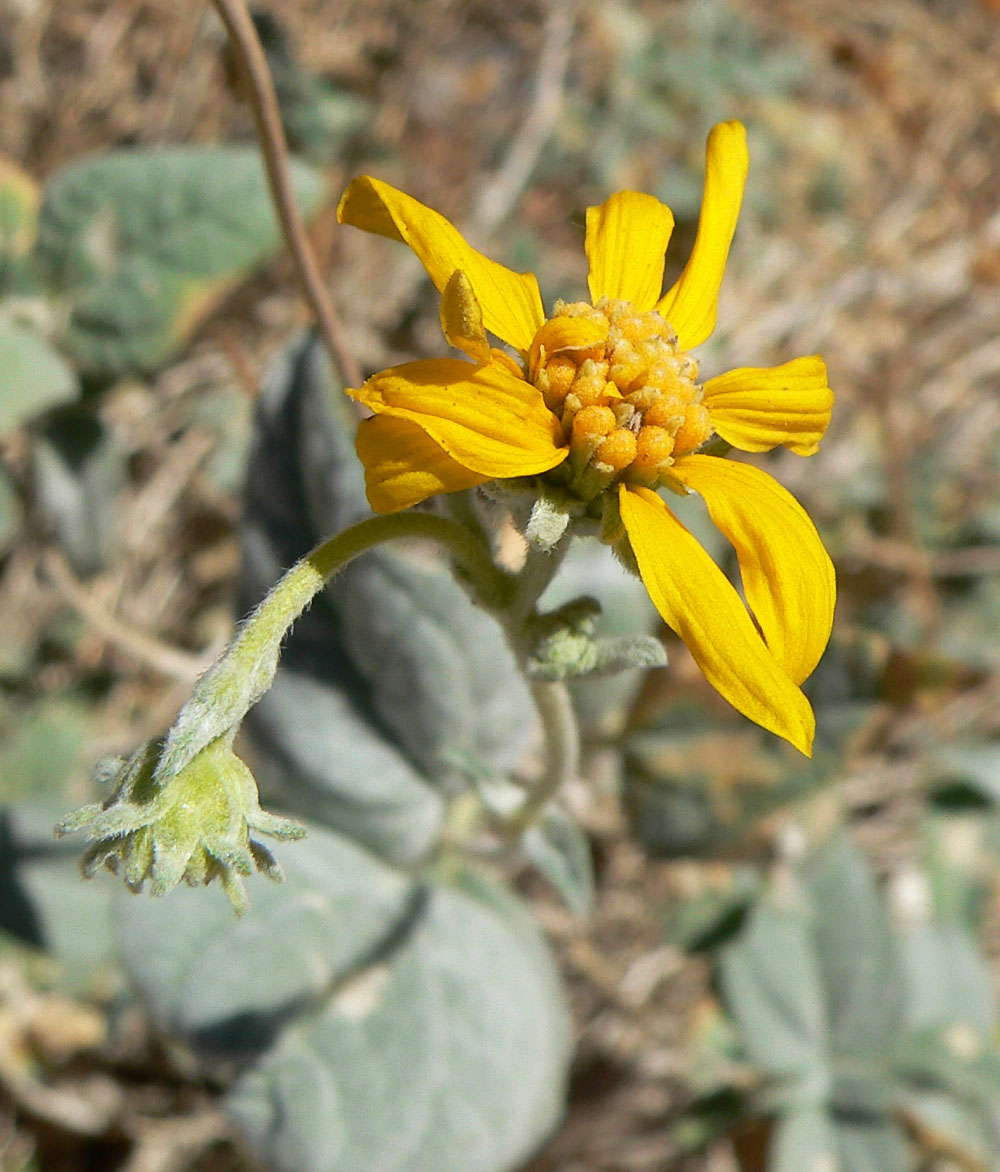

Conservation status
- Vulnerable (NatureServe)

Scientific classification
- Kingdom: Plantae
- Clade: Tracheophytes
- Clade: Angiosperms
- Clade: Eudicots
- Clade: Asterids
- Order: Asterales
- Family: Asteraceae
- Genus: Bahiopsis
- Species: B. reticulata

Binomial name
- Bahiopsis reticulata (S.Watson) E.E.Schill. & Panero

Synonyms
- Viguiera reticulata S.Watson

= Bahiopsis reticulata =

Species of flowering plant

Bahiopsis reticulata is a species of flowering plant in the family Asteraceae known by the common names netvein goldeneye and Death Valley goldeneye. It is native to the Mojave Desert of California and Nevada, where it grows in several types of dry desert habitat. Many of the populations are inside Death Valley National Park.

Bahiopsis reticulata is a tangled shrub with many slender stems covered in soft hairs and peeling bark. It easily exceeds one meter in height and width. The gray-green leaves are oppositely arranged on the lower stems and alternately on the upper. The leaf blades are generally oval with pointed tips and measure up to 9 centimeters long by 6.5 wide. They are deeply veined, coated in woolly hairs, and glandular but not shiny. The inflorescence is a cyme of sunflower-like flower heads borne on a hairy, leafless peduncle. The flower head has several yellow ray florets measuring up to 1.5 centimeters long. The fruit is an achene tipped with a pappus.
