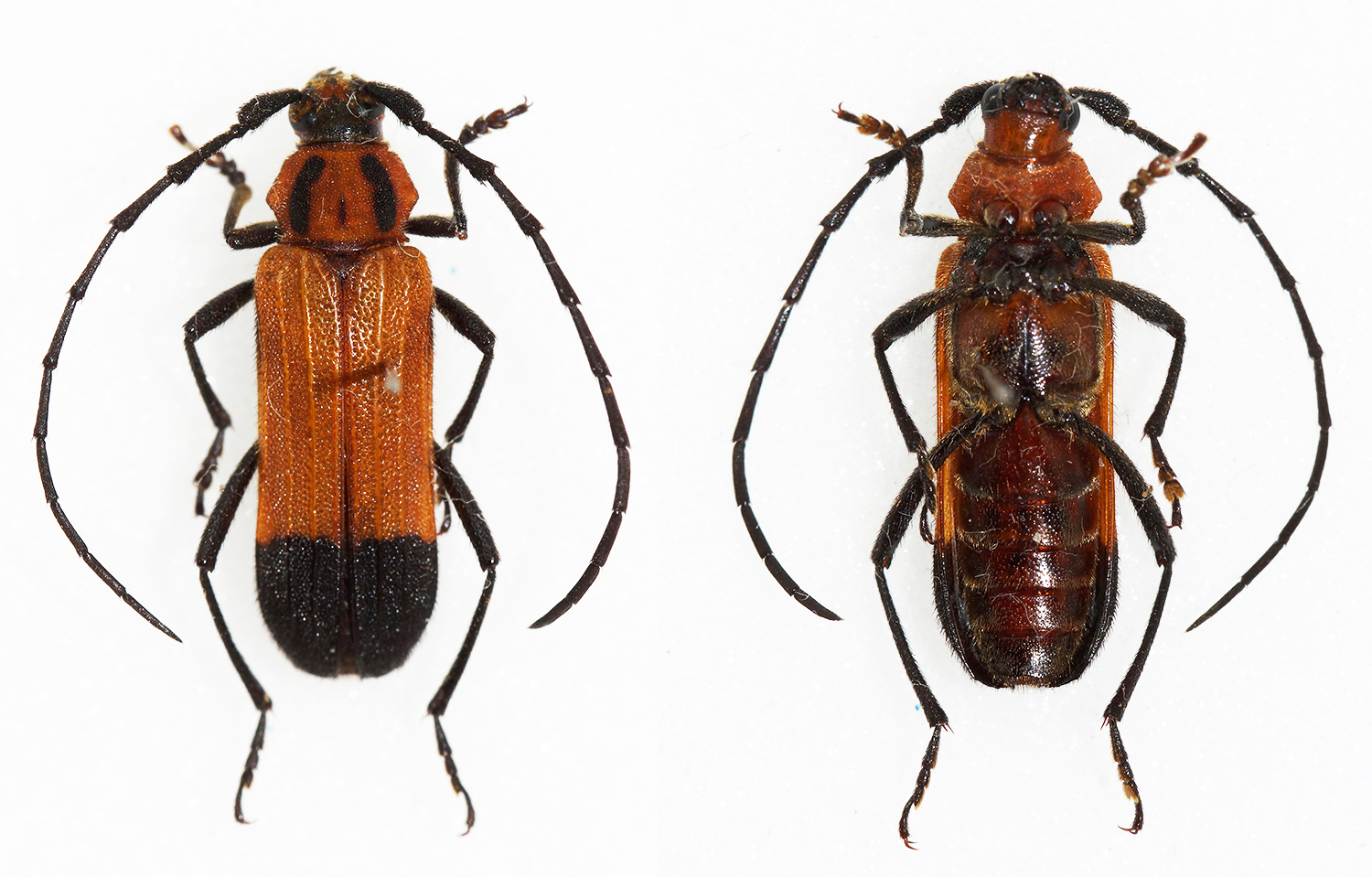
- Dorsal and ventral views of a male found in Texas

Scientific classification
- Kingdom: Animalia
- Phylum: Arthropoda
- Class: Insecta
- Order: Coleoptera
- Suborder: Polyphaga
- Infraorder: Cucujiformia
- Family: Cerambycidae
- Genus: Parevander
- Species: P. hovorei

Binomial name
- Parevander hovorei Giesbert in Giesbert and Penrose, 1984

= Parevander hovorei =

Species of beetle

Parevander hovorei is a species of beetle in the family Cerambycidae. It was described by Giesbert in 1984.
