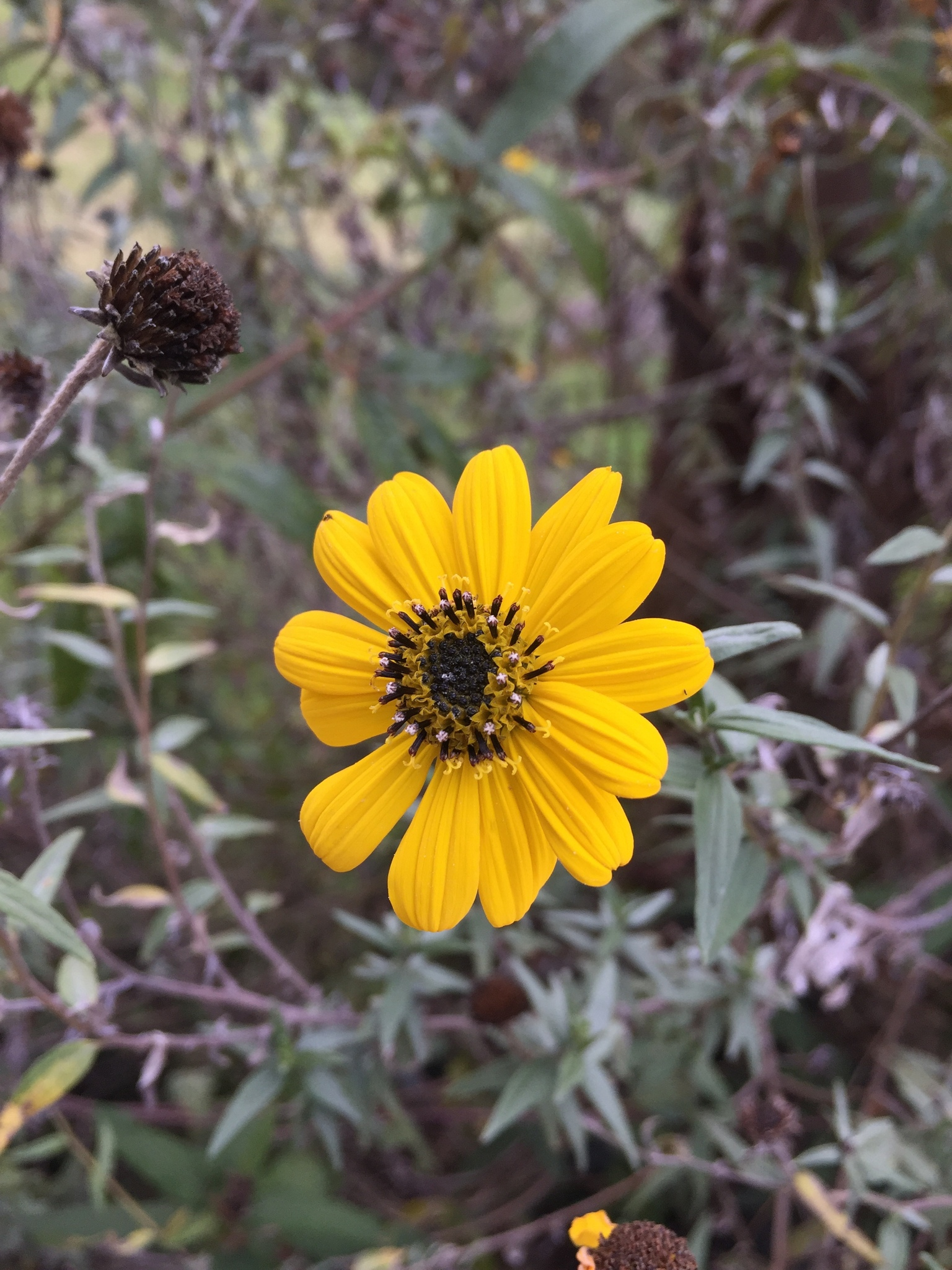
- Pappobolus argenteus

Scientific classification
- Kingdom: Plantae
- Clade: Tracheophytes
- Clade: Angiosperms
- Clade: Eudicots
- Clade: Asterids
- Order: Asterales
- Family: Asteraceae
- Subfamily: Asteroideae
- Tribe: Heliantheae
- Subtribe: Helianthinae
- Genus: Pappobolus; S.F.Blake

Synonyms
- Helianthopsis H.Rob.

= Pappobolus =

Genus of flowering plants

Pappobolus is a genus of flowering plant in the family Asteraceae native to the Andes Mountains of Colombia, Ecuador, and Peru.

Pappobolus is distinguished from closely related genera by its combination of shrubby habit and usually caducous pappus. Within the genus there is considerable variation in the pappus, a structure that has traditionally been considered a key to defining genera in Asteraceae, and this led to earlier confusion in defining the genus. Most of the species of the genus were originally described as members of Helianthus, based on having a pappus of two caducous awns. When it was recognized that they were not part of the exclusively North American Helianthus, they were transferred to a genus called Helianthopsis. The prominent synantherologist S.F.Blake, however, much earlier named the genus Pappobolus based on species that have a pappus of numerous caducous awns. It was only during the work of Panero on the genus that the congeneric nature of plants of the two pappus types was recognized, and this has subsequently been supported by both molecular phylogenetic studies and phytochemical analyses. Subsequent studies have shown that the genus is related to members of the subtribe Helianthinae that occur in Mexico, and it is likely that migration into South America only occurred following the closure of the Panamanian land bridge about 3 million years ago. Thus, the genus has exhibited an amazing burst of radiation in producing the relatively large number of species, a result in part that reflects the highly dissected montane topography of the Andean region.

Species accepted by the Plants of the World Online as of December 2022:

- Pappobolus acuminatus (S.F.Blake) Panero
- Pappobolus acutifolius (S.F.Blake) Panero
- Pappobolus amoenus Panero
- Pappobolus andinus Panero
- Pappobolus argenteus (Humb., Bonpl. & Kunth) Panero
- Pappobolus cajamarcensis Panero
- Pappobolus cinerascens S.F.Blake
- Pappobolus davidii Panero
- Pappobolus decumbens Panero
- Pappobolus discolor (S.F.Blake) Panero
- Pappobolus ecuadoriensis Panero
- Pappobolus hutchisonii (H.Rob.) Panero
- Pappobolus hypargyreus (S.F.Blake) Panero
- Pappobolus imbaburensis (Hieron.) Panero
- Pappobolus jelskii (Hieron.) Panero
- Pappobolus juncosae Panero
- Pappobolus lanatus (Heiser) Panero
- Pappobolus lehmannii (Hieron.) Panero
- Pappobolus lodicatus (Cuatrec.) Panero
- Pappobolus macranthus S.F.Blake
- Pappobolus matthewsii (Hochr.) Panero
- Pappobolus microphyllus (Humb., Bonpl. & Kunth) Panero
- Pappobolus mollicomus S.F.Blake
- Pappobolus nigrescens (Heiser) Panero
- Pappobolus robinsonii Panero
- Pappobolus sagasteguii (H.Rob.) Panero
- Pappobolus sanchezii Panero
- Pappobolus schillingii Panero
- Pappobolus senex (S.F.Blake) Panero
- Pappobolus smithii (Ferreyra) Panero
- Pappobolus storkhortonianus Panero
- Pappobolus stuebelii (Hieron.) Panero
- Pappobolus subniveus (S.F.Blake) Panero
- Pappobolus verbesinoides (Kunth) Panero
- Pappobolus viridior (S.F.Blake) Panero
- Pappobolus woodsonianus Cuatrec.
- Pappobolus youngiorum Panero
