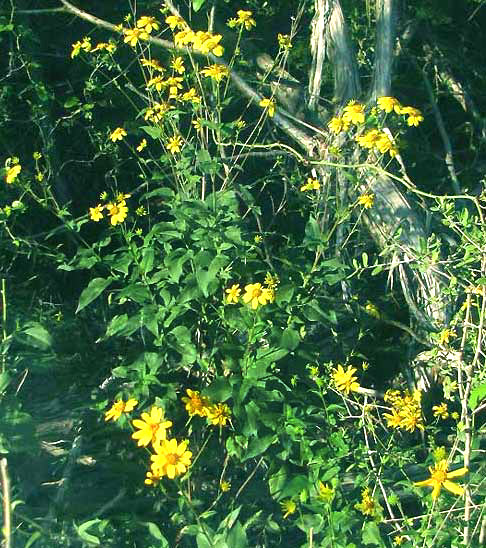
- Viguiera dentata as pretty weeds

Scientific classification
- Kingdom: Plantae
- Clade: Embryophytes
- Clade: Tracheophytes
- Clade: Spermatophytes
- Clade: Angiosperms
- Clade: Eudicots
- Clade: Asterids
- Order: Asterales
- Family: Asteraceae
- Tribe: Heliantheae
- Genus: Viguiera
- Species: V. dentata

Binomial name
- Viguiera dentata (Cav.) Spreng.

Synonyms
- Synonymy: Helianthus dentatus Cav.; Viguiera dentata var dentata; Viguiera dentata var lancifolia S.F. Blake; Viguiera dentata var longibracteata B.L. Turner

= Viguiera dentata =

Species of plant

Viguiera dentata, known variously as sunflower goldeneye, toothleaf goldeneye and other names, is a common—sometimes abundant—and weedy wildflower species throughout its mostly neotropical distribution area. At its flowering peak it may present spectacular displays. It belongs to the family Asteraceae.

== Description ==
Viguiera dentata at first looks like numerous other aster family species with yellow flowers. To be sure of its identity, it may be necessary to note these details:

- It is an herbaceous but perennial plant up to 2 metres (6.6 ft) tall. Usually several stems arise from the base.
- Leaves covered with stiff hairs lying close to the blade surfaces arise opposite one another at stem bases, but alternate singly higher up. Blades vary in shape but generally are egg-shaped or narrower, with pointed tips, and up to 15 cm (6 in) long and 8 cm (3 in) wide; margins are finely to distinctly toothed.
- Several flowering heads rise atop peduncles up to 15 cm (6 in) long.
- Each flowering head has at its bottom up to 30 green, sharply tipped involucral bracts of varying lengths and widths, with sides overlapping one another.
- Each flowering head consists of up to 14 yellow, petal-like ray florets surrounding an "eye" of 50 or more yellow disk florets with cylindrical corollas. Only disk florets are fertile and produce fruits, the ray florets only providing pollen.
- Wrapped around each disk floret there's an unusually conspicuous, tan-colored, papery, scale-like bract, the palea.
- Fruits are one seeded "cypselae", atop which usually but not always there's a distinctive, crown-like pappus consisting of scales. Two scales with needlelike tops may be up to 3 mm (0.1 in) long, while 0-6 much shorter scales with variously and somewhat irregularly lacerated tops accompany them. The scales may persist atop the cypselae, eventually fall off, or never exist in the first place.

== Distribution ==
Viguiera dentata occurs in the Southwestern United States in the states of Arizona, New Mexico and Texas. Mostly, however, the species is native throughout Mexico, Cuba and Central America, entering South America in Colombia.

== Habitat ==
In the US, Viguiera dentata occurs on dry slopes, in canyons, fields and roadside ditches up to 2,300 metres (7,500 ft) in elevation. In highland central Mexico often it's abundant in secondary vegetation of different kinds including roadsides, also in forests of oak, conifers, and in tropical forest with deciduous leaves where extended dry seasons occur, and dry scrubland, up to 2,900 metres (9,500 ft).

== Ecology ==
Viguiera dentata demonstrates as allelopathic effect inhibiting the germination of certain tropical weed seeds, thus having a potential for use as a bioherbicide in tropical crops.

During photosynthesis, Viguiera dentata employs the C_{3} carbon fixation pathway. In full sunlight the plant may grow almost twice as tall and develop twice as many secondary shoots, or tillers, and develop 54% greater dry weight, and 5 times as many flowers, as plants growing in shade. However, shaded plants develop 48% more leaf area per plant, mainly due to bearing more leaves per plant.

== Human uses ==
=== Traditional medicine ===
Noting that the inhabitants of San Rafael, Coxcatlan, Puebla, Mexico used infusions of aerial parts of Viguiera dentata to treat baby rash, it was found that bacteria were sensitive to essential oil from the species, though the oil showed no antifungal activity. Also in Mexico, in the state of Sonora it's used as an antiseptic and in Quintana Roo state to suppress coughing.

=== In honey production ===
In Mexico's Yucatan Peninsula, where the Mayan people traditionally have produced much honey, 40% of annual honey production has been attributed only to Viguiera dentata.

=== As pig food ===
In Mexico's dry Yucatan Peninsula where grain crops may be scarce but Viguiera dentata grows abundantly, it was found that, though pregnant pigs gained more weight on a diet with sorghum and soybeans, they did well on a diet containing up to 50% Viguiera dentata, both freshly collected and as silage. Because of the high cost of grain livestock feed and the low cost of feeding Viguiera dentata, it was found that in an economic sense supplementing pregnant pigs with that plant was very advantageous.

=== In fireworks ===
In Mexico's Yucatan Peninsula, where Viguiera dentata grows tall in dense populations, the stems can become exceptionally straight for up to 2.5 meters (over 8 feet), and be light and smooth. Artisans use such stems as bases for rockets which explode for fireworks and make loud noises during festivities. Such stems keep the rockets flying more or less skyward.

=== In gardens ===
In the US, wildflower gardeners appreciate Viguiera dentata because it is extremely drought-tolerant on various dry, calcareous soils. Also, in October and November it produces colorful flowers with nectar for bees and butterflies while through most of the winter it provides forage for seed-eating birds, and reseeds readily under favorable conditions. However, it's vulnerable to deer.

== Taxonomy ==
Edward Schilling in Flora of North America remarks that "It is likely that the genus will be narrowed to include only a single species, V. dentata (including V. helianthoides Kunth), and that new or resurrected genera will accommodate the remaining species. The mentioned V. helianthoides now is regarded as a synonym of Viguiera dentata var. dentata.

=== Etymology ===
The genus name Viguiera honors Louis Guillaume Alexandre Viguier, the author of Monographiæ de Papavere.

The species name dentata is from the Latin dentatus derived from dent-, meaning "tooth". Probably the name reflects the taxon's toothed leaves, though sometimes the teeth are very small.

== Gallery ==
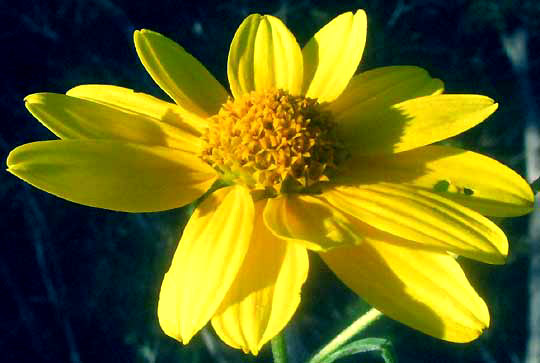
Viguiera dentata flowering head from above

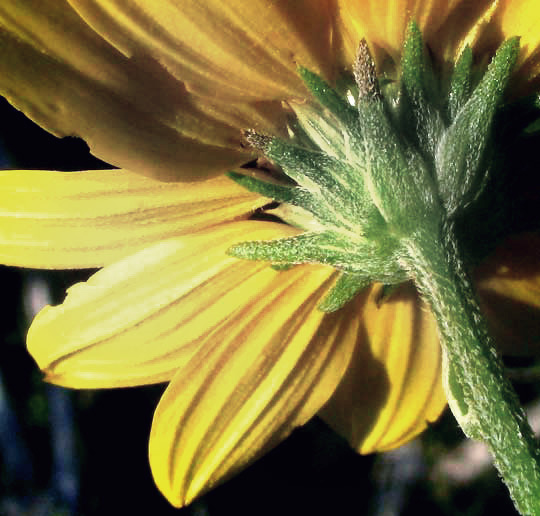
Viguiera dentata flowering head from above

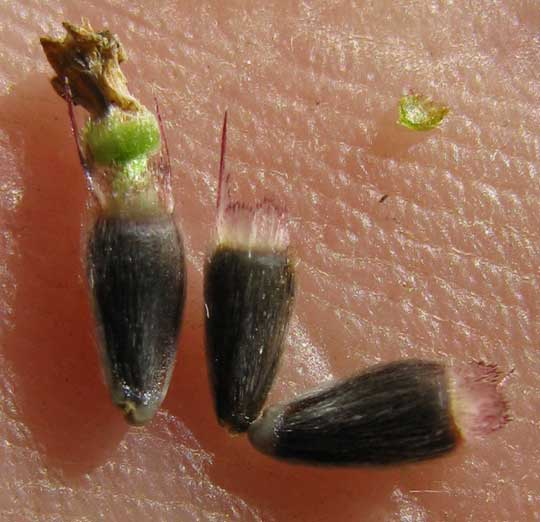
Viguiera dentata cypselae topped with crown-like pappuses

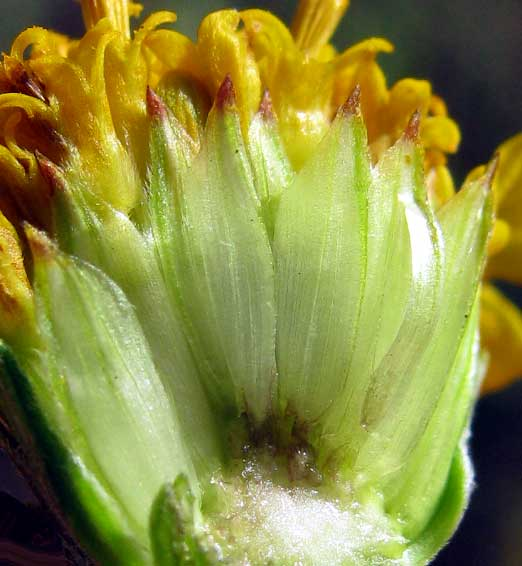
Viguiera dentata paleae wrapped around disk florets

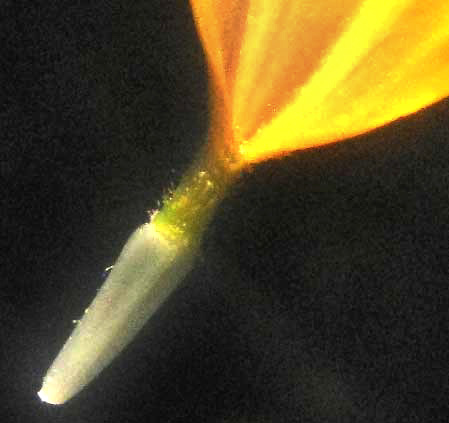
Viguiera dentata infertile ray flower without styles

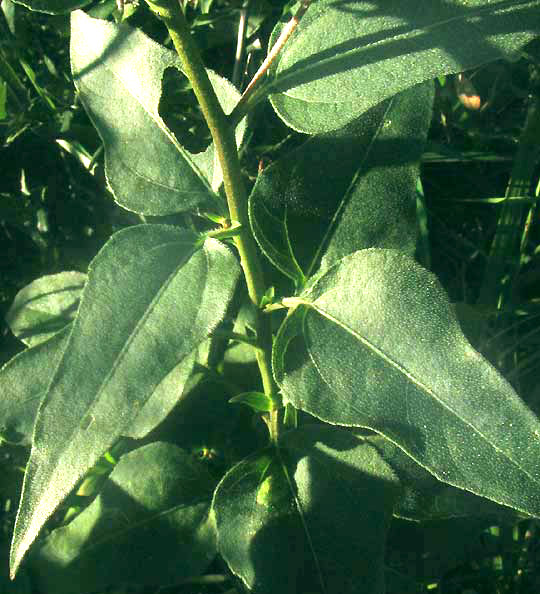
Viguiera dentata finely toothed leaves

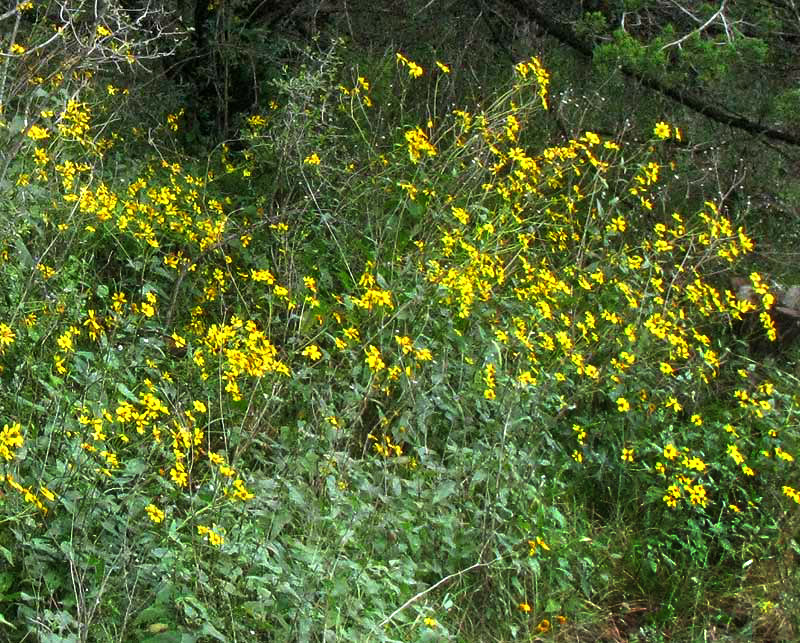
Viguiera dentata colony

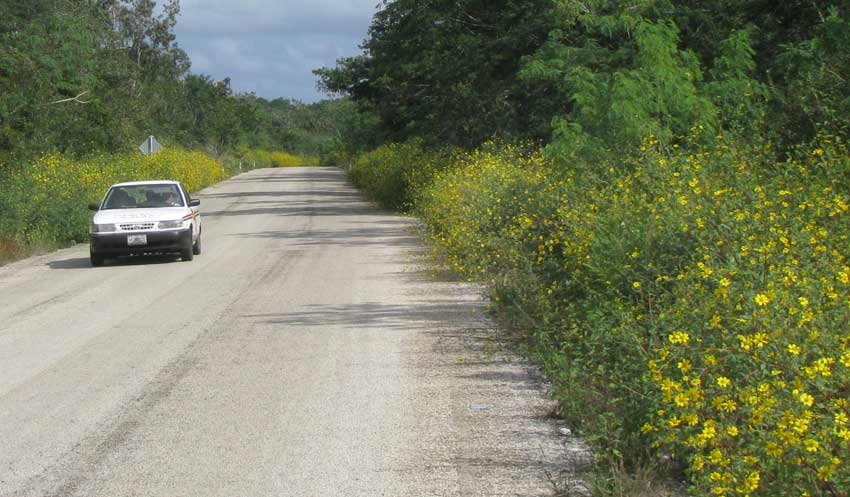
Viguiera dentata flowering along road in Mexico
