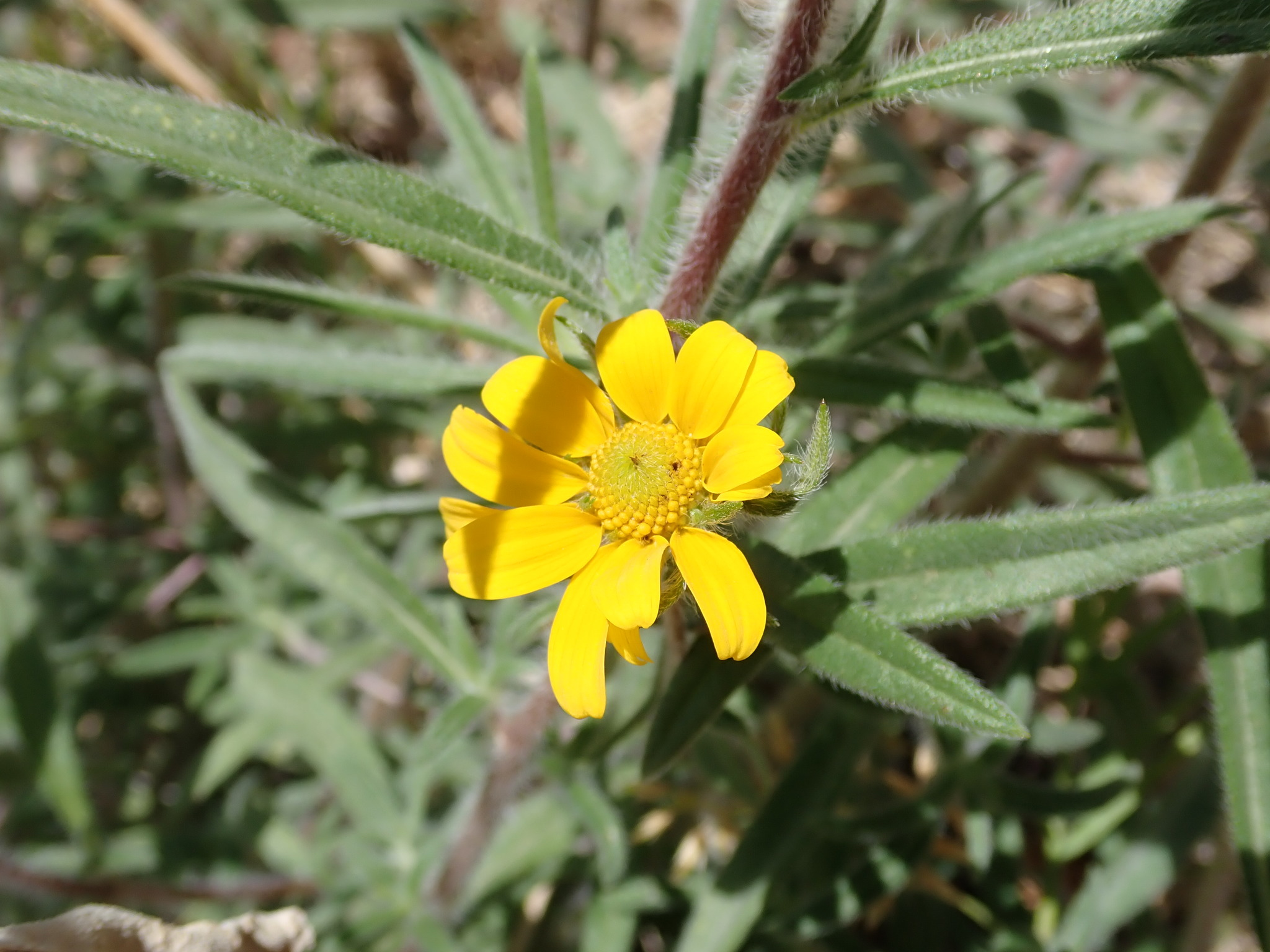

Scientific classification
- Kingdom: Plantae
- Clade: Tracheophytes
- Clade: Angiosperms
- Clade: Eudicots
- Clade: Asterids
- Order: Asterales
- Family: Asteraceae
- Tribe: Heliantheae
- Genus: Heliomeris
- Species: H. longifolia

Binomial name
- Heliomeris longifolia (B.L.Rob. & Greenm.) Cockerell 1918

Synonyms
- Gymnolomia longifolia B.L.Rob. & Greenm. 1899; Viguiera longifolia (B.L.Rob. & Greenm.) S.F.Blake; Heliomeris annuus (M.E.Jones) Cockerell, syn of var. annua

= Heliomeris longifolia =

Species of plant

Heliomeris longifolia is a North American species of flowering plants in the family Asteraceae called the longleaf false goldeneye. It is widespread across much of Mexico from Chihuahua and Sonora south to Chiapas, and found also in the southwestern United States from Nevada to western Texas.

Heliomeris longifolia is an annual herb up to 15 cm (5.9 in) tall, with a large taproot. Leaves are up to 16 cm (6.3 in) long, with hairs along the edges. One plant can produce 25 or more yellow flower heads, each head with 12-14 ray flowers surrounding 50 or more tiny disc flowers.

Varieties

- Heliomeris longifolia var. annua (M.E.Jones) W.F.Yates
- Heliomeris longifolia var. longifolia
