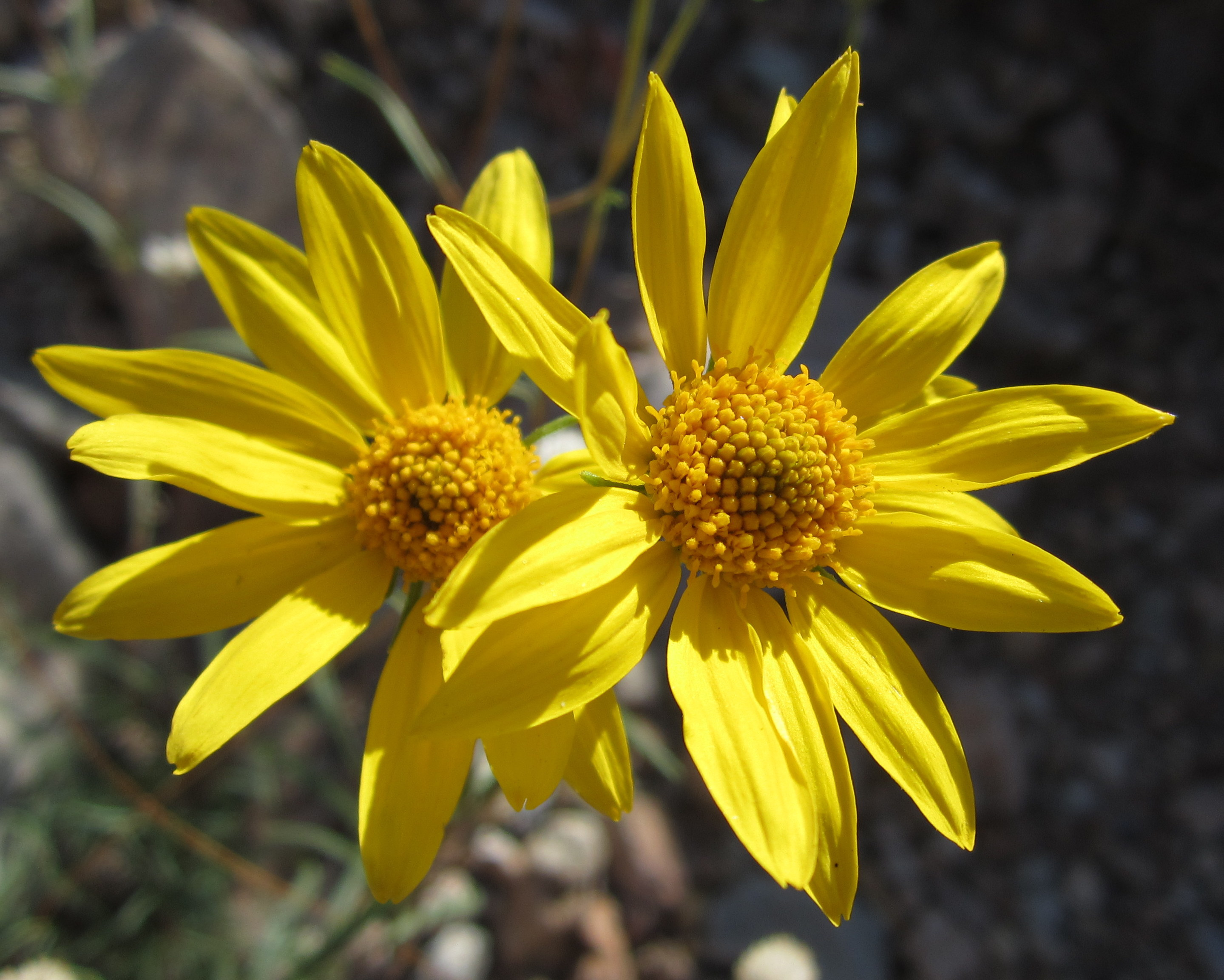

Conservation status
- Apparently Secure (NatureServe)

Scientific classification
- Kingdom: Plantae
- Clade: Tracheophytes
- Clade: Angiosperms
- Clade: Eudicots
- Clade: Asterids
- Order: Asterales
- Family: Asteraceae
- Genus: Heliomeris
- Species: H. multiflora

Binomial name
- Heliomeris multiflora Nutt.

Synonyms
- Synonymy: Heliomeris multiflorus Nutt. 1848; Gymnolomia multiflora (Nutt.) Rothr.; Viguiera multiflora (Nutt.) S.F. Blake; Gymnolomia brevifolia Greene ex Wooton & Standl., syn of var. brevifolia; Heliomeris brevifolia (Greene ex Wooton & Standl.) Cockerell, syn of var. brevifolia; Viguiera ovalis S.F.Blake, syn of var. brevifolia; Gymnolomia nevadensis A.Nelson, syn of var. nevadensis; Heliomeris nevadensis (A.Nelson) Cockerell

= Heliomeris multiflora =

Species of plant

Heliomeris multiflora is a North American species of flowering plants in the family Asteraceae called the showy goldeneye. It grows in Mexico and the western United States from Montana to Jalisco.

Heliomeris multiflora is a perennial herb up to 15 cm (5.9 in) tall, with a large taproot. Leaves are up to 16 cm (6.3 in) long, with hairs along the edges. One plant can produce 25 or more yellow flower heads, each head with 12-14 ray flowers surrounding 50 or more tiny disc flowers.

Varieties

- Heliomeris multiflora var. brevifolia (Greene ex Wooton & Standl.) - Arizona, New Mexico, Utah
- Heliomeris multiflora var. multiflora - from Idaho and Montana south to Durango
- Heliomeris multiflora var. nevadensis (A.Nelson) W.F.Yates - from California east to Utah and south to Jalisco
