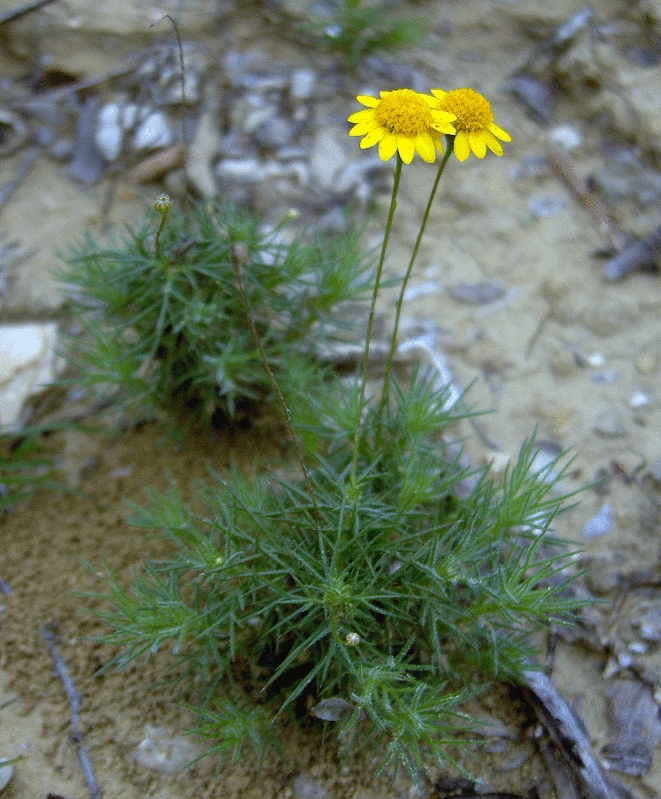
- Viguiera stenoloba S.F.Blake, which is a synonym of Sidneya tenuifolia var. tenuifolia

Scientific classification
- Kingdom: Plantae
- Clade: Tracheophytes
- Clade: Angiosperms
- Clade: Eudicots
- Clade: Asterids
- Order: Asterales
- Family: Asteraceae
- Genus: Sidneya; E.E.Schill. & Panero

= Sidneya =

Genus of flowering plant

Sidneya is a genus of flowering plants belonging to the family Asteraceae.

Its native range is southern central USA (in the states of New Mexico and Texas) to Mexico and El Salvador.

The genus name of Sidneya is in honour of Sidney Fay Blake (1892–1959), an American botanist and plant taxonomist. It was first described and published in Bot. J. Linn. Soc. Vol.167 on page 327 in 2011 by botanists Edward E. Schilling and José Luis Panero. They had described four new genera, Dendroviguiera, Gonzalezia, Heiseria and Sidneya, which are all composed of species that were formerly included in the genus Viguiera.

== Known species ==
According to Kew:

- Sidneya pinnatilobata (Sch.Bip.) E.E.Schill. & Panero
- Sidneya tenuifolia (A.Gray) E.E.Schill. & Panero
