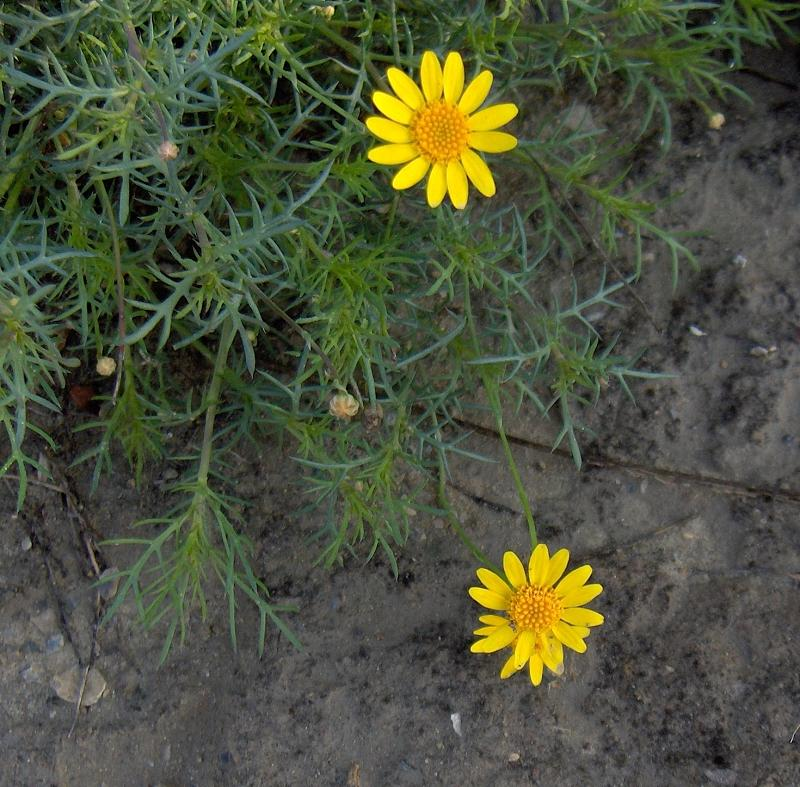
- Viguiera stenoloba

Scientific classification
- Kingdom: Plantae
- Clade: Tracheophytes
- Clade: Angiosperms
- Clade: Eudicots
- Clade: Asterids
- Order: Asterales
- Family: Asteraceae
- Subfamily: Asteroideae
- Tribe: Heliantheae
- Subtribe: Helianthinae
- Genus: Viguiera; Kunth

Species
- See text

Synonyms
- Haplocalymma S.F.Blake

= Viguiera =

Genus of flowering plants

Viguiera is a genus of flowering plants in the family Asteraceae. It contains around 19–40 species, which are commonly known as goldeneyes and are native to the New World. These are herbs to bushy shrubs that bear yellow or orange daisy-like flowers.

== Taxonomy ==
The name honours French physician L. G. Alexandre Viguier (1790–1867).

It was first described and published by Carl Sigismund Kunth in (F. W. H. von Humboldt, A. J. A. Bonpland and Carl Sigismund Kunth, edited), Nov. Gen. Sp., ed. fol., vol. 4 on page 176 in 1818.

Recent molecular phylogenetic studies by botanists Schilling and Panero in 2011, showed that these species are within a large group that were formerly classified in the genus Viguiera, and so Aldama has been expanded to include a total of 118 species (most of those from Viguiera).

== Species ==
19 species are accepted by Plants of the World Online (shown by pw), and World Flora Online accepts 40 species (shown in list below);

- Viguiera anchusaefolia (DC.) Baker
- Viguiera aspiliodies Baker
- Viguiera benzorium B.L.Turner
- Viguiera buddleiiformis (DC.) Benth. & Hook.f. ex Hemsl.
- Viguiera cornifolia (Kunth) S.F.Blake
- Viguiera corumbensis Malme
- Viguiera davilae Panero & Villaseñor
- Viguiera dentata (Cav.) Spreng. (pw)
- Viguiera drymonia Klatt
- Viguiera ensifolia (Sch.Bip.) S.F.Blake
- Viguiera flava (Hemsl.) S.F.Blake
- Viguiera funkiae N.A.Harriman & H.Rob. (pw)
- Viguiera goebelii (Klatt) H.Rob. (pw)
- Viguiera grammatoglossa DC. (pw)
- Viguiera hassleriana Chodat (pw)
- Viguiera hypochlora (S.F.Blake) S.F.Blake
- Viguiera latibracteata (Hemsl.) S.F.Blake
- Viguiera leptodonta S.F.Blake (pw)
- Viguiera maculata S.F.Blake (pw)
- Viguiera megapotamica Malme
- Viguiera microphylla Vasey & Rose
- Viguiera mima S.F.Blake (pw)
- Viguiera moreliana B.L.Turner (pw)
- Viguiera oligantha S.González, M.González Elizondo & Rzed.
- Viguiera orientalis B.L.Turner (pw)
- Viguiera paneroana Rzed. & Calderón (pw)
- Viguiera paranensis (Malme) J.U.Santos
- Viguiera parkinsonii (Hemsl.) S.F.Blake
- Viguiera pazensis Rusby (pw)
- Viguiera pinnatilobata (Sch.Bip.) S.F.Blake
- Viguiera revoluta (Meyen) S.F.Blake
- Viguiera reyrobinsonii B.L.Turner
- Viguiera santacatarinense (H.Rob. & A.J.Moore) A.A.Sáenz
- Viguiera scandens V.M.Badillo (pw)
- Viguiera simulans S.F.Blake (pw)
- Viguiera spooneri (Panero & E.E.Schill.) B.L.Turner
- Viguiera sultepecana Paray
- Viguiera szyszylowiczii Hieron. (pw)
- Viguiera tepoxtlensis Paray (pw)
- Viguiera tripartita (B.L.Rob. & Greenm.) S.F.Blake
- Viguiera truxillensis (Kunth) S.F.Blake
- Viguiera weberbaueri S.F.Blake (pw)

Selected species transferred to Aldama includes; Viguiera australis S.F.Blake, Viguiera cordifolia A.Gray, Viguiera media S.F.Blake, Viguiera nudicaulis Baker,Viguiera paneroi B.L.Turner, Viguiera phenax S.F.Blake – Field Goldeneye, Viguiera procumbens (Pers.) S.F.Blake, Viguiera sodiroi (Hieron.) S.F.Blake, Viguiera stenoloba S.F.Blake – Skeletonleaf Goldeneye, Viguiera sylvatica Klatt, Viguiera triloba (A.Gray) J.Olsen – Yellow Streamers and Viguiera tuberosa (Sch.Bip.) Benth. & Hook.f. ex Griseb.

=== Formerly placed here ===
- Bahiopsis deltoidea (as V. deltoidea)
- Bahiopsis laciniata (A.Gray) E.E.Schill. & Panero (as V. laciniata A.Gray)
- Bahiopsis parishii (Greene) E.E.Schill. & Panero (as V. deltoidea var. parishii (Greene) Vasey & Rose and V. parishii Greene)
- Bahiopsis reticulata (S.Watson) E.E.Schill. & Panero (as V. reticulata S.Watson)
- Helianthus porteri (A.Gray) Pruski (as V. porteri (A.Gray) S.F.Blake)
- Heliomeris longifolia var. annua (M.E.Jones) W.F.Yates (as V. annua (M.E.Jones) W.F.Yates)
- Heliomeris multiflora var. multiflora Nutt. (as V. multiflora (Nutt.) S.F.Blake)

== Distribution ==
Viguiera species are native to the countries of; Argentina, Belize, northern Chile, Guatemala, Honduras, Mexico, Paraguay, Peru, Venezuela and the United States (within the states of Arizona, New Mexico and Texas).

It has been introduced into Colombia and Cuba.
