= External transcribed spacer =

Non-functional RNA

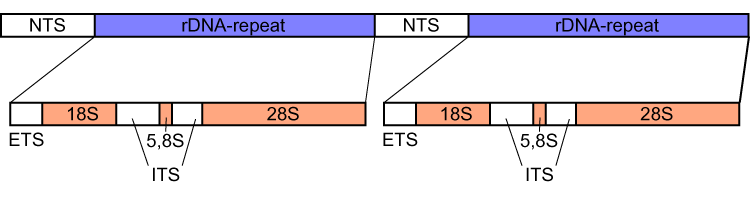
Organization of the eukaryotic nuclear ribosomal DNA tandem repeats.

External transcribed spacer (ETS) refers to a piece of non-functional RNA, closely related to the internal transcribed spacer, which is situated outside structural ribosomal RNAs (rRNA) on a common precursor transcript. ETS sequences characteristic to an organism can be used to trace its phylogeny.
