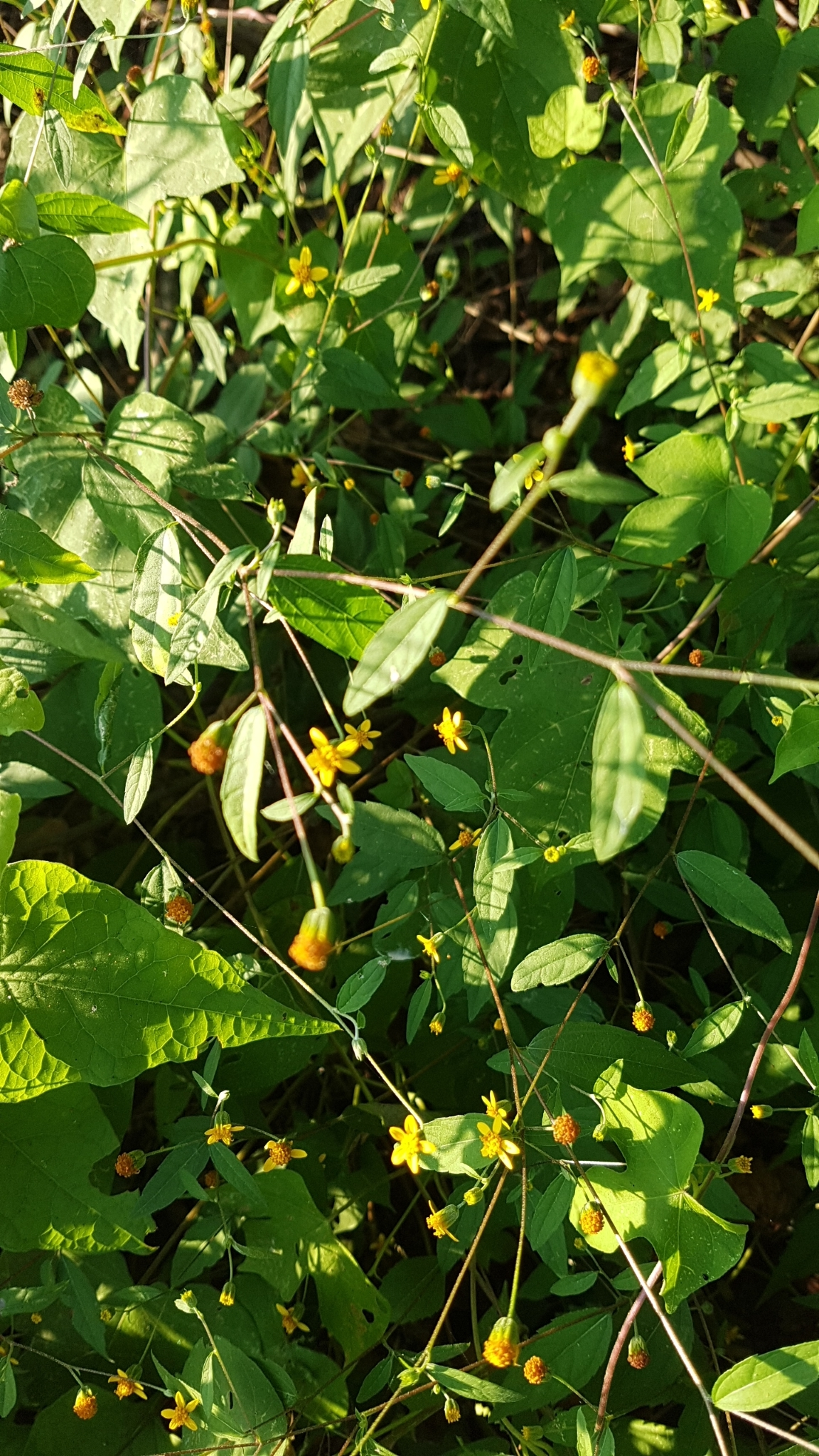
- Hymenostephium tenue

Scientific classification
- Kingdom: Plantae
- Clade: Tracheophytes
- Clade: Angiosperms
- Clade: Eudicots
- Clade: Asterids
- Order: Asterales
- Family: Asteraceae
- Subtribe: Helianthinae
- Genus: Hymenostephium; Benth. in Benth. & Hook.f.

Type species
- Hymenostephium mexicanum Benth. in Benth. & Hook.f.

Synonyms
- Garcilassa Poepp. & Endl.in E.F.Poeppig & S.L.Endlicher, Nov. Gen. Sp. Pl. 3: 45 (1843); Haplocalymma S.F.Blake in Proc. Amer. Acad. Arts 51: 517 (1916); Microcephalum Sch.Bip. ex Klatt in Leopoldina 23: 90 (1887), not validly publ.; Viguiera sect. Diplostichis S.F.Blake

= Hymenostephium =

Genus of flowering plants

Hymenostephium is a genus of flowering plants in the family Asteraceae. It includes herbs and slender shrubs that occur from Mexico through to Venezuela and north-western Argentina.

== Description ==
Hymenostephium is characterized by the relatively slender habit of the plants, 1–2 seriate involucres, and relatively small heads of flowers. There is variation in the pappus which, in part, has led to some members having been placed formerly in the now empty genus Haplocalymma, or in separate genera now considered as synonymous with Hymenostephium.

Molecular phylogenetic data place the genus as sister to Sclerocarpus and in a relatively basal position in the subtribe Helianthinae, the group that includes the common sunflower (Helianthus annuus).

== Species ==
Includes 22 accepted species;

- Hymenostephium anomalum (S.F.Blake) E.E.Schill. & Panero - Colombia
- Hymenostephium brandegeei (S.F.Blake) E.E.Schill. & Panero - Mexico (Baja California)
- Hymenostephium cordatum (Hook. & Arn.) S.F.Blake - Mexico to northern Colombia
- Hymenostephium debile (Cabrera) Cabrera - Argentina (Jujuy, Salta ), Bolivia (Santa Cruz)
- Hymenostephium gracillimum (Brandegee) E.E.Schill. & Panero - Mexico (Oaxaca, Chiapas)
- Hymenostephium hintonii (H.Rob.) E.E.Schill. & Panero - Mexico (Guerrero, Michoacán)
- Hymenostephium kingii (McVaugh) E.E.Schill. & Panero - Mexico (Nayarit, Jalisco)
- Hymenostephium lepidostephanum (Cuatrec.) E.E.Schill. & Panero - Peru
- Hymenostephium meridense S.F.Blake - Venezuela
- Hymenostephium molinae (H.Rob.) E.E.Schill. & Panero - Nicaragua
- Hymenostephium mucronatum (S.F.Blake) E.E.Schill. & Panero - Colombia, Venezuela
- Hymenostephium quitensis (Benth.) E.E.Schill. & Panero - Colombia to Venezuela (Táchira) and Ecuador
- Hymenostephium rivularis (Poepp.) E.E.Schill. & Panero - Central America to western Bolivia
- Hymenostephium rudbeckioides S.F.Blake - Ecuador to Peru
- Hymenostephium serratum (Rusby) E.E.Schill. & Panero - Colombia, Venezuela
- Hymenostephium strigosum (Klatt) E.E.Schill. & Panero - Costa Rica
- Hymenostephium superaxillare S.F.Blake - Mexico (Chihuahua, Durango)
- Hymenostephium tenue (A.Gray) E.E.Schill. & Panero - Mexico (Oaxaca, Chiapas, Guerrero, Michoacán, Puebla, México State, Jalisco, Nayarit)
- Hymenostephium uniseriatum E.E.Schill. & Panero - Mexico (Morelos, Guerrero, Michoacán, Puebla, México State)
- Hymenostephium viride Steyerm. - Venezuela
- Hymenostephium websteri (B.L.Turner) E.E.Schill. & Panero - Mexico (Jalisco, Nayarit)
- Hymenostephium woronowii (S.F.Blake) E.E.Schill. & Panero - Mexico (Michoacán)

== Distribution ==
They are native to the countries of north western Argentina, Bolivia, Colombia, Costa Rica, Ecuador, El Salvador, Guatemala, Honduras, Mexico, Nicaragua, Panamá, Peru and Venezuela.
