= José L. Panero =

Mexican-American botanist

- Born: 1959 (age 66–67)
- Scientific career
- Fields: Botany
- Author abbrev. (botany): Panero

José L. Panero (born 1959) is a Mexican-American botanist. He earned his Bachelor of Arts from the University of Miami in 1984 and his Master's (1986) and Ph.D. (1990) from the University of Tennessee. He did postdoctoral studies at the University of Texas at Austin. He is a specialist in neotropical flora, with an emphasis on the Asteraceae family.
