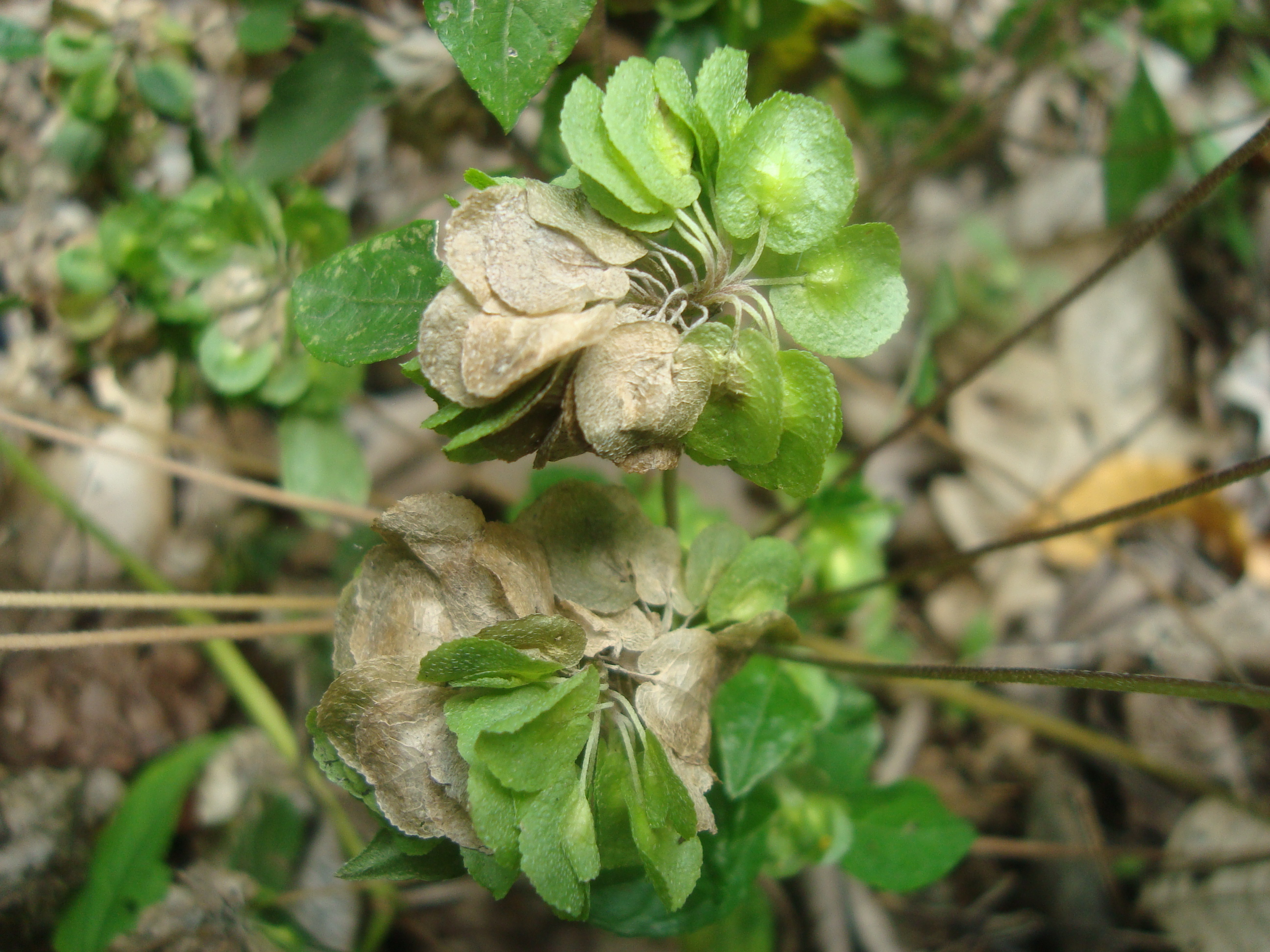
- Fruits of a Delilia species

Scientific classification
- Kingdom: Plantae
- Clade: Embryophytes
- Clade: Tracheophytes
- Clade: Angiosperms
- Clade: Eudicots
- Clade: Asterids
- Order: Asterales
- Family: Asteraceae
- Subfamily: Asteroideae
- Tribe: Heliantheae
- Subtribe: Ecliptinae
- Genus: Delilia; Spreng.

Type species
- Delilia berteroi (syn of D. biflora) Spreng.

= Delilia =

Genus of flowering plants

Delilia is a genus of flowering plants in the family Asteraceae.

== Phylogeny ==
Based on three plastid and two nuclear markers the genus Delila has been found to form a well supported clade with the genera Blainvillea, Calyptocarpus, Jefea, Lasianthaea and Synedrella.

Species

- Delilia biflora (L.) Kuntze - Mesoamerica, South America, Galápagos, Cuba
- Delilia inelegans (Hook.f.) Kuntze - Galápagos
- Delilia repens (Hook.f.) Kuntze - Galápagos
