= Milleria =

Milleria is the scientific name of two genera of organisms and may refer to:

- Milleria (moth), a genus of insects in the family Zygaenidae
- Milleria (plant), a genus of plants in the family Asteraceae
