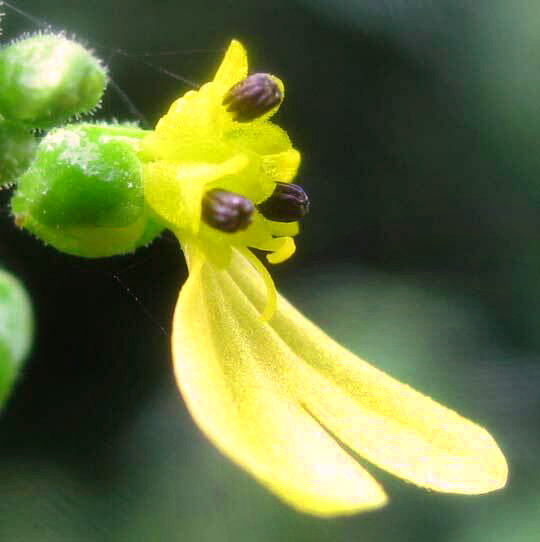
- Milleria quinqueflora flowering head

Scientific classification
- Kingdom: Plantae
- Clade: Embryophytes
- Clade: Tracheophytes
- Clade: Angiosperms
- Clade: Eudicots
- Clade: Asterids
- Order: Asterales
- Family: Asteraceae
- Genus: Milleria
- Species: M. quinqueflora

Binomial name
- Milleria quinqueflora L.

Synonyms
- Synonymy: Helianthus aridus Rydb.; Milleria dichotoma Cav.; Milleria glandulosa DC.; Milleria maculata Mill.; Milleria perfoliata B.L.Turner; Milleria peruviana H.Rob.; Milleria quinqueflora var. maculata (Mill.) DC.; Milleria trifolia Mill.

= Milleria quinqueflora =

Species of plant

Milleria quinqueflora, with no commonly accepted English name, is a species of neotropical plant belonging to the family Asteraceae. It is the only species belonging to the genus Milleria.

== Description ==
Milleria quinqueflora is a widespread, herbaceous, weedy, neotropical plant. As a monotypic member of the Asteraceae it's unusual because of its very reduced and modified flower heads. Here are other distinguishing features:

- As a tap-rooted, branching, thin-stemmed, herbaceous plant living for just one year, it grows up to 2 metres (6.6 ft) or more tall. Leaves and stems are variously hairy, the outer ones with sticky glands among the hairs.
- Leaves with pointed tips mostly arise opposite one another and are 3-nerved from their bases. Blades vary in shape but generally are somewhat egg-shaped, with margins almost without teeth or indentations ranging to conspicuously toothed. The blades, up to 25 cm (10 in) long and 18 cm (7 in) wide though usually smaller, at their bases grade into short petioles.
- Flowering heads are arranged in panicles on short peduncles, the outer ones hairy with sticky glands. Involucral bracts usually are a little less than 4 mm (0.16 in) tall and variously hairy.
- Flowering heads produce only 1 or rarely 2 ray florets with yellow, petal-like, deeply 3-lobed corollas up to 6 mm (0.24 in) long; these florets bear only female parts—are "pistillate"—and produce fruits. Beside the ray floret(s) there are 4 or 5 disk florets with cylindrical, green or greenish to yellow corollas about half as long as the ray floret corollas; disk florets bear purplish-black anthers but no female parts and produce no fruits.
- One-seeded, cypsela-type fruits when mature usually are tightly enclosed within enlarged, hardened involucral bracts and form a rough-surfaced body of irregular shape around 5 mm (0.20 in) long.

== Distribution ==
Milleria quinqueflora occurs throughout most of Mexico, except for the northeastern part, plus Cuba and Central America south into South America as far as Ecuador and Peru.

== Habitat ==
In highland central Mexico, Milleria quinqueflora mainly is a weedy species in disturbed sites and secondary growth, and sometimes enters dry scrubland up to 2,200 m (7,200 ft) in elevation. In a fairly arid, low-elevation part of Mexico's Isthmus of Tehuantepec, it occurs in gallery forest but not in surrounding dry scrub. In Mexico's low-elevation Yucatan Peninsula it inhabits various tropical forest types adapted for extended dry seasons, as well as scrub associated with coastal dunes.

== In traditional medicine ==
In Central America, aerial parts of Milleria quinqueflora are used as a remedy for skin infections. In the Mexican state of Oaxaca the leaves are applied to inflamed skin. In Sonora the root is used for stomach inflammation. In Quintana Roo crushed leaves are applied between the toes for inflammation.

== Ecology ==
A study focusing on agroforestry practices encouraging bee-plant interactions in Costa Rica found that Milleria quinqueflora was one of the five most important flowering plant species during the rainy seasons, on land serving as pastures and coffee plantations; thus, the species was valuable to local farmers producing honey from stingless Melipona bees. It was proposed that Milleria quinqueflora be planted to support the entire bee community.

== Taxonomy ==
The taxon Milleria quinqueflora is a venerable one, having been described and published in 1735 by Carl Linnaeus himself in the first edition of his Species Plantarum, volume 2, on page 919. Linnaeus based his description on plants grown from seeds of unknown source at the Uppsala Botanical Garden.

In the same publication, Linnaeus described and published the genus Milleria, attributing to it two species, Milleria quinqueflora and M. biflora. The latter species later was reassigned to the genus Delilia as Delilia biflora. This made the genus Milleria a monotypic taxon, except when M. peruviana was considered to be a second species, but now that taxon is reduced to synonymy for M. quinqueflora.

=== Etymology ===
The genus name Milleria was named in honor of Philip Miller (1691-1771), a Scottish horticulturist and botanist at Chelsea Physic Garden who Linnaeus visited in 1736.

The species name quinqueflora is a New Latin construction based on the Latin quinque, meaning "five", and flora, similarly borrowed from Latin, the name Flōra being the name of the goddess of flowers and the flowering season, and by extension, flowers themselves. Thus "5 flowers", which the flowering heads Linnaeus described may have had—four disk florets and one ray floret. However, floret numbers can vary.

== Gallery ==
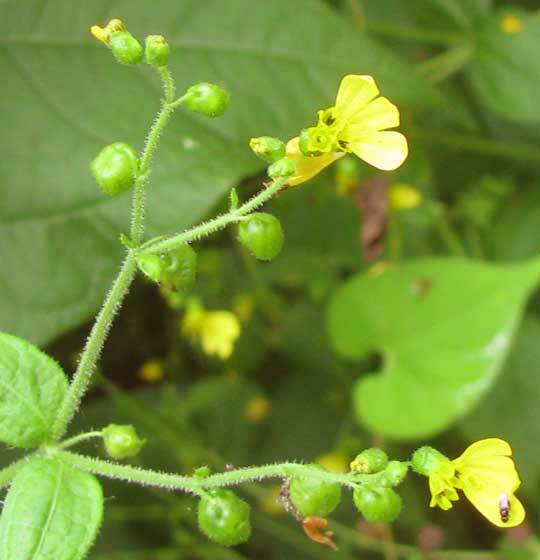
Milleria quinqueflora inflorescences

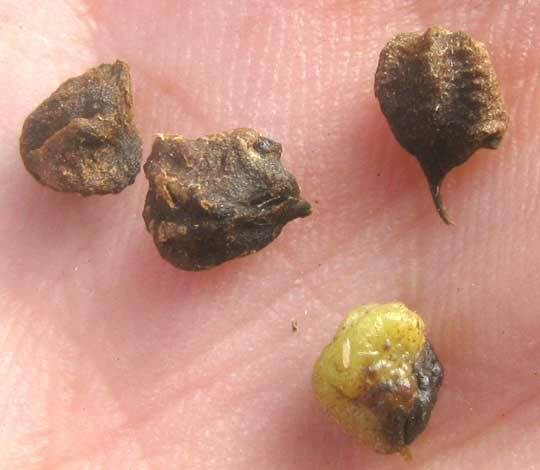
Milleria quinqueflora one-seeded cypselae covered with hardened involucral bracts

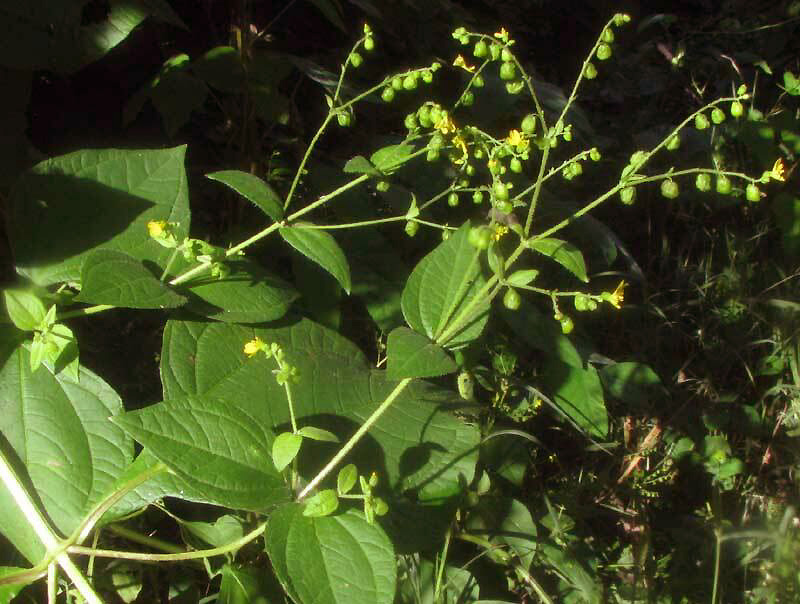
Milleria quinqueflora plant in weedy habitat
