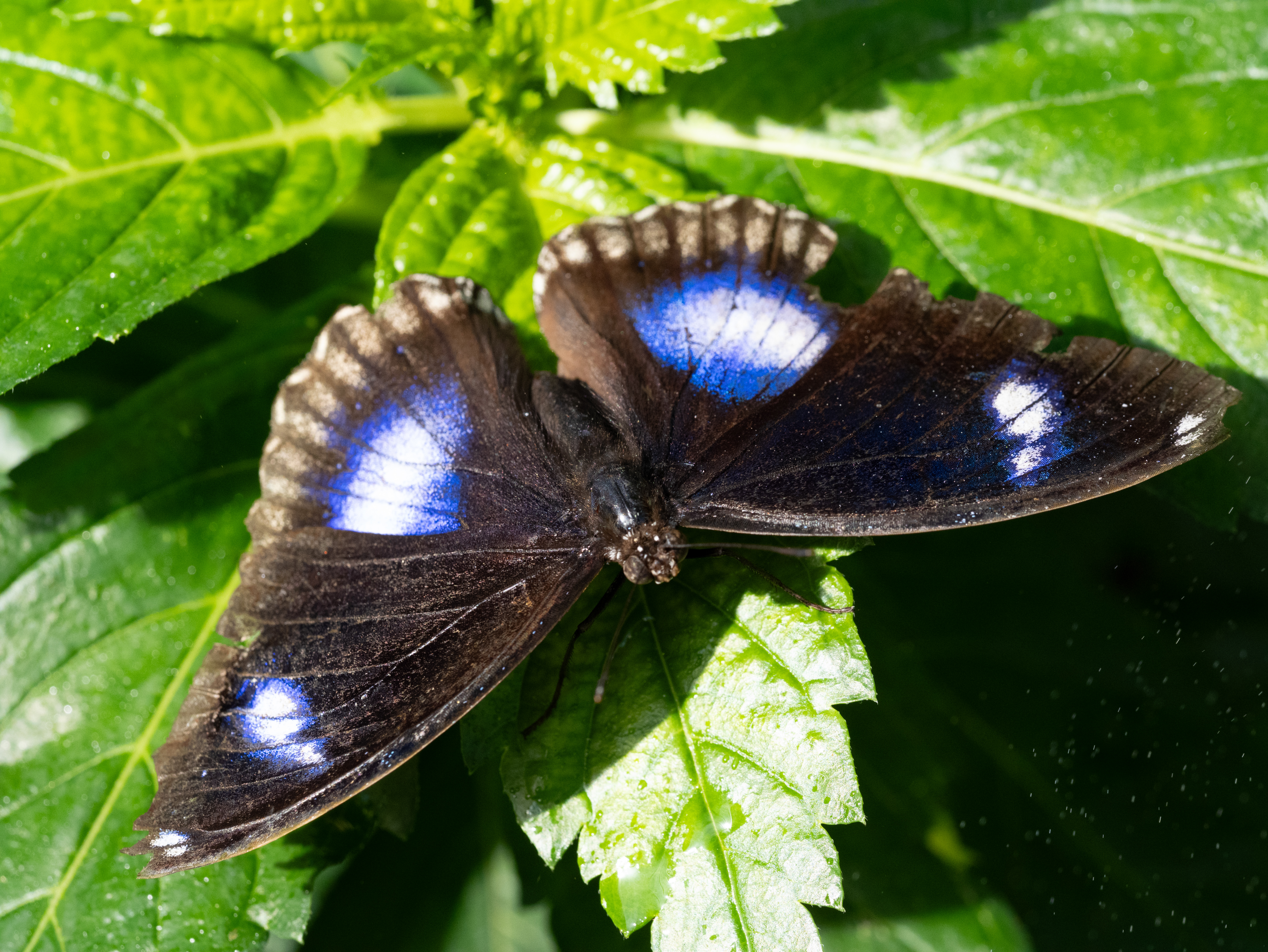
- Male
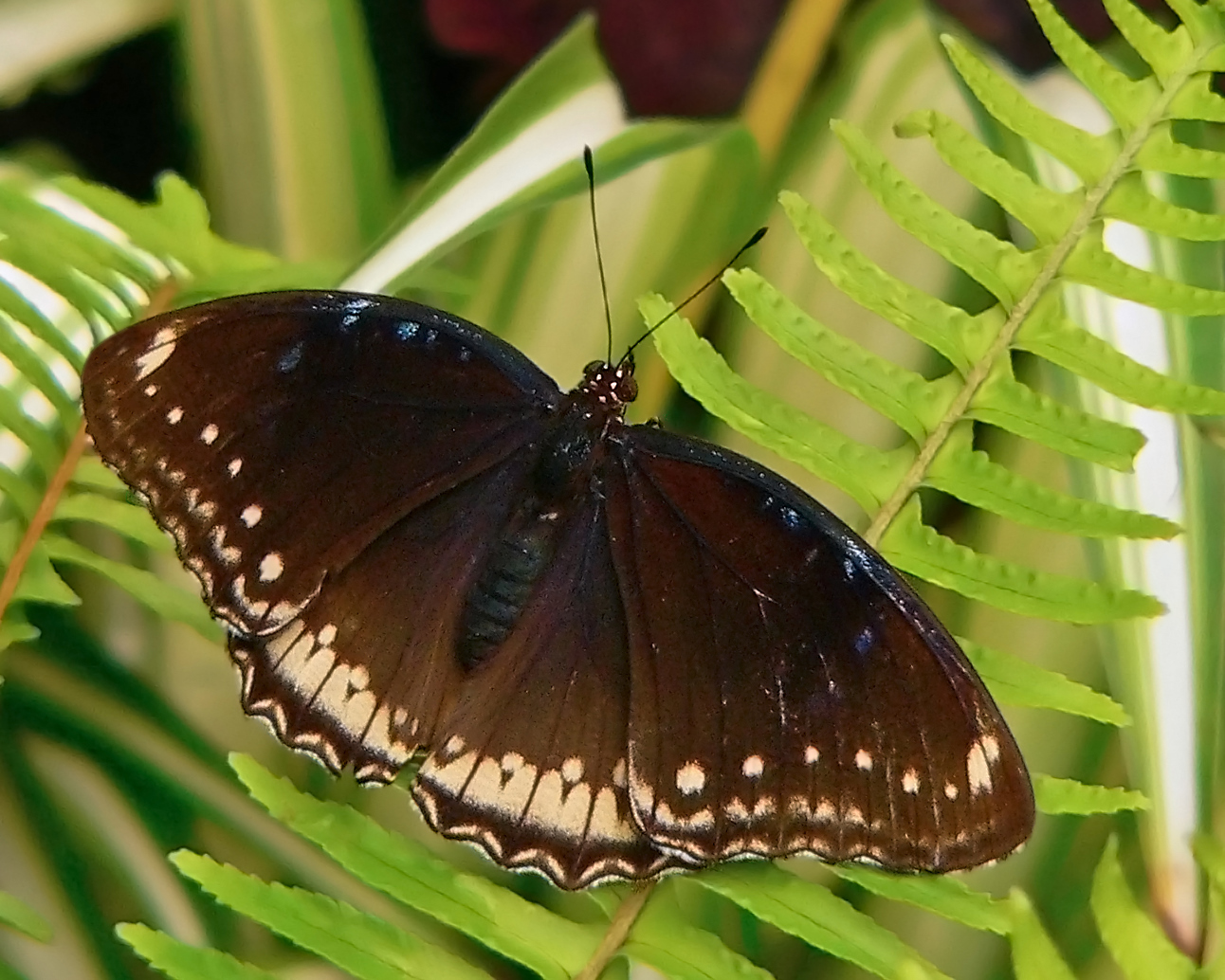
- Female

Scientific classification
- Kingdom: Animalia
- Phylum: Arthropoda
- Clade: Pancrustacea
- Class: Insecta
- Order: Lepidoptera
- Family: Nymphalidae
- Genus: Hypolimnas
- Species: H. bolina

Binomial name
- Hypolimnas bolina (Linnaeus, 1758)

Subspecies
- Eight, see text

Synonyms
- Papilio bolina Linnaeus, 1758; Hypolimnas parva Aurivillius, 1920; Nymphalis jacintha Drury, [1773]

= Hypolimnas bolina =

Varied Eggfly

Species of butterfly

Hypolimnas bolina, the great eggfly, common eggfly, varied eggfly, or in New Zealand the blue moon butterfly, is a species of nymphalid butterfly found from Madagascar to Asia and Australia.

== Appearance ==
=== Race bolina ===
H. bolina is a black-bodied butterfly with a wingspan of about 70–85 millimetres (2.8–3.3 in). The species has a high degree of sexual dimorphism. The female is mimetic with multiple morphs.

==== Male ====
Males are monomorphic. The dorsal wing surface is jet black but features three prominent spots, two on the forewing and one on the hindwing. To a human observer these appear as white spots fringed with blue-violet. They actually consist of a white center overlain by bright ultraviolet iridescence, a colour generated by nanostructures on the wing scale surface. Numerous smaller white spots fringe the fore- and hindwings. The ventral surface lacks any ultraviolet iridescence and consists essentially of banded white markings set against a brownish background. These males exhibit lower body mass per unit wing area, implying lower wing loading, more elongate wings, resulting in a higher aspect ratio, which are also the characteristics used to differ them by their conspecific females. They bear striking resemblance to Hypolimnas alimena in terms of flight musculature (thoracic mass).

==== Female ====
Females are hugely variable due to the presence of both genetic polymorphism and phenotypic plasticity. Polymorphism is expressed primarily on the dorsal surface, with morphs varying in the presence of white, orange, and blue markings. One genetic morph, named euploeoides by Clarke & Sheppard (1975), is thought to present a mimic of one or several members of the genus Euploea. The female ventral wing surfaces are similar to those of the male. Phenotypic plasticity is such that individuals are generally darker if they develop under cooler temperatures.

== Gallery ==
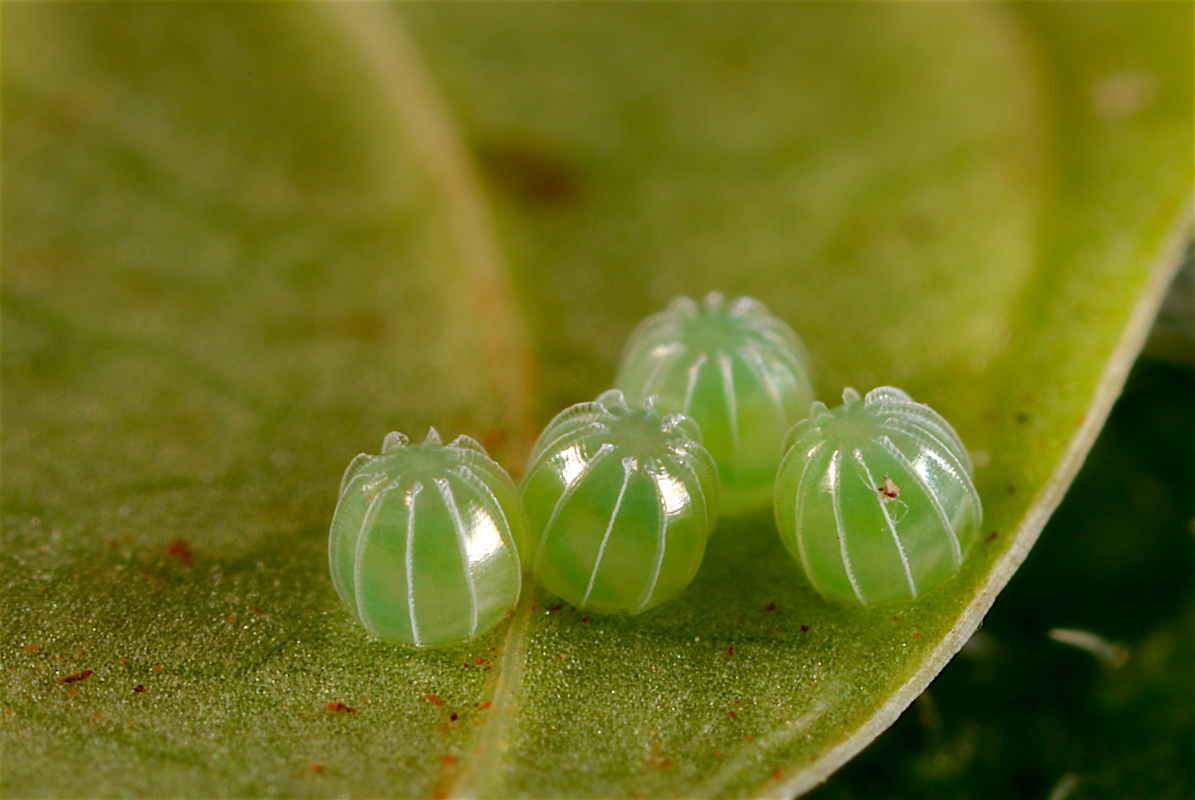
Eggs

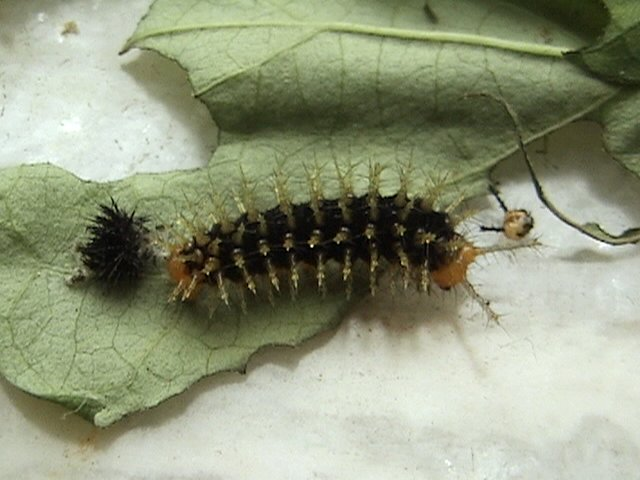
Caterpillar of race bolina

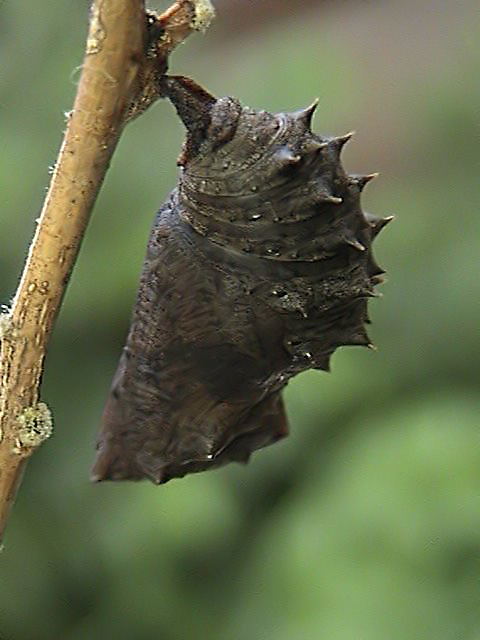
Pupa of race bolina

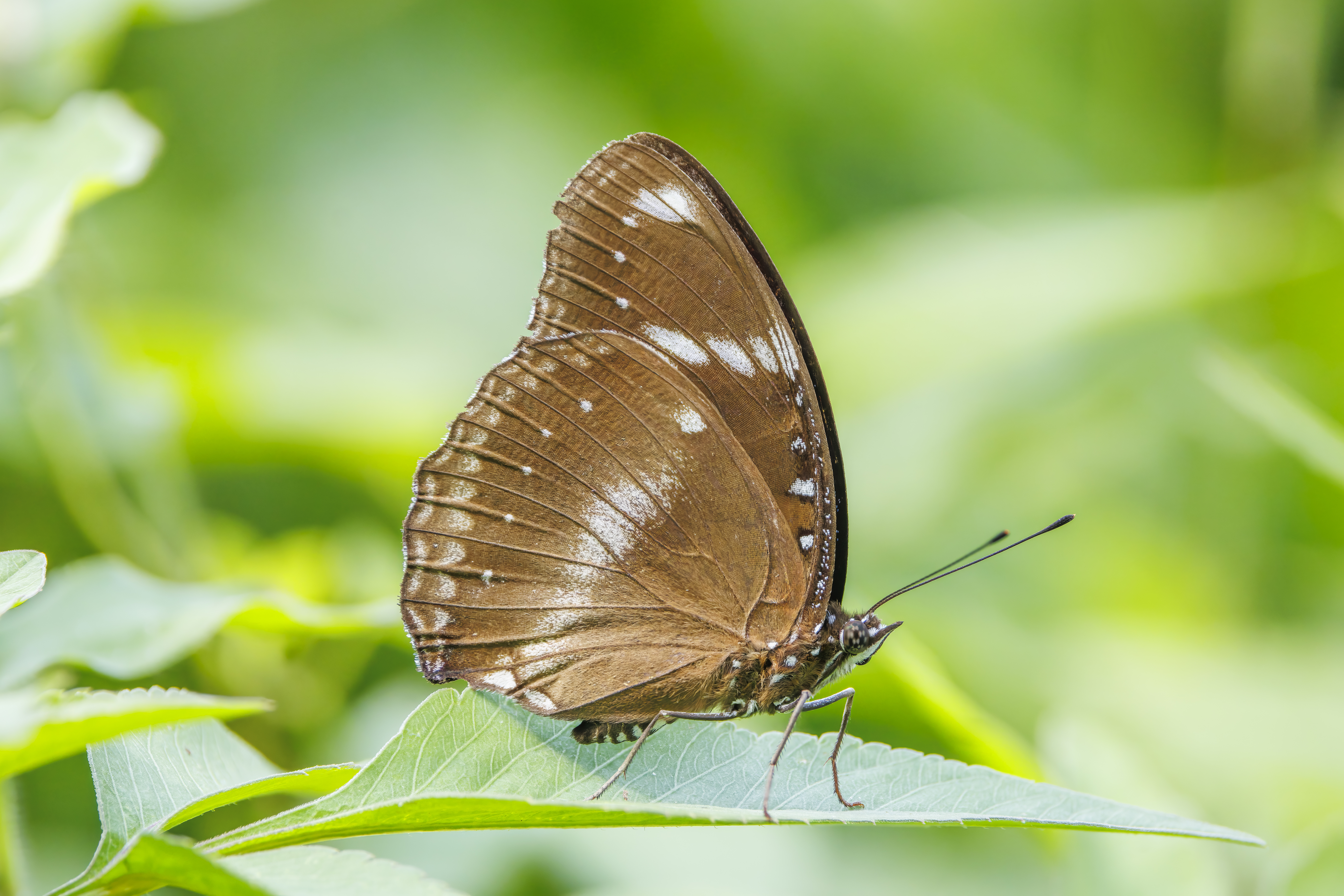
H. b. bolina, Hong Kong

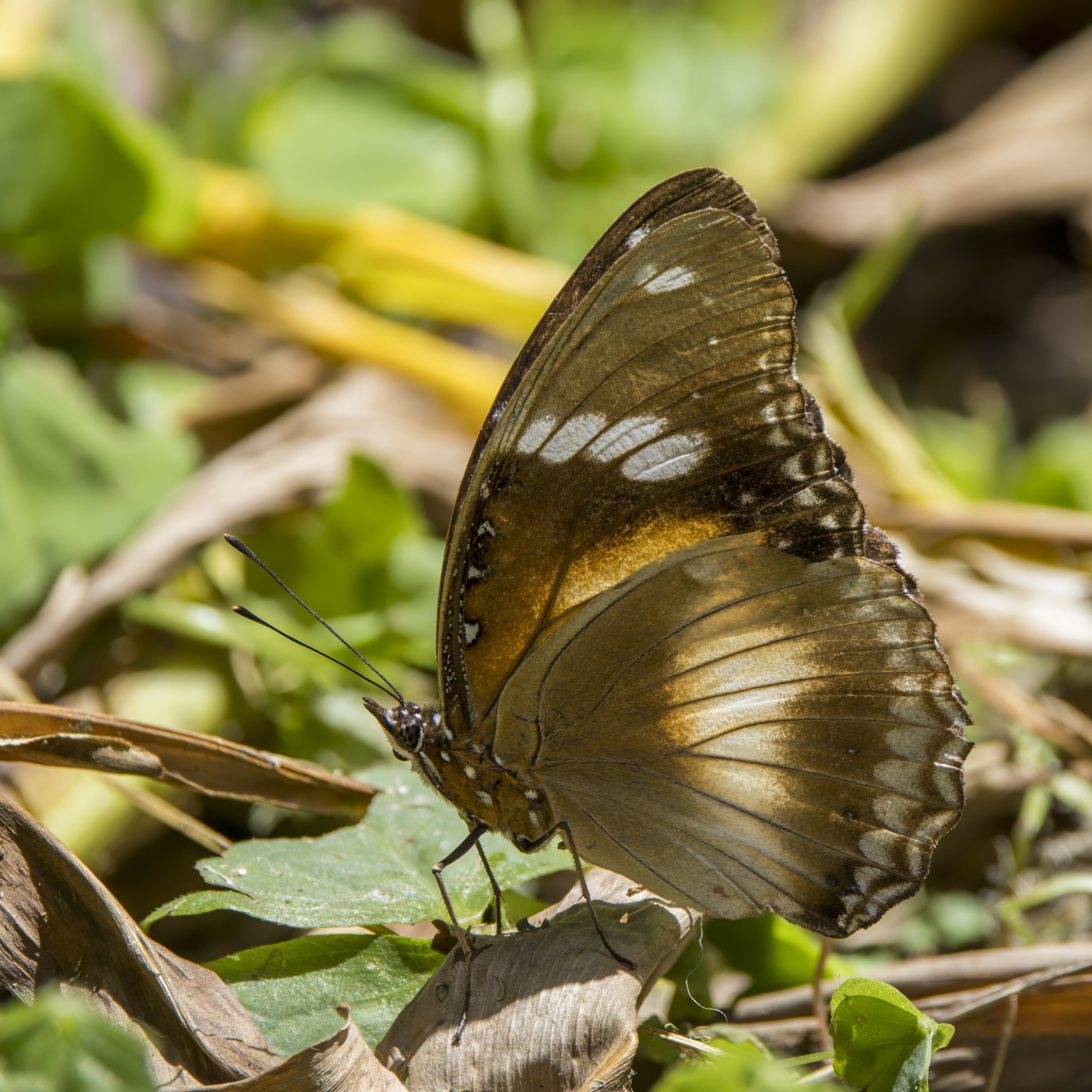
female H. b. nerina
Cook Islands

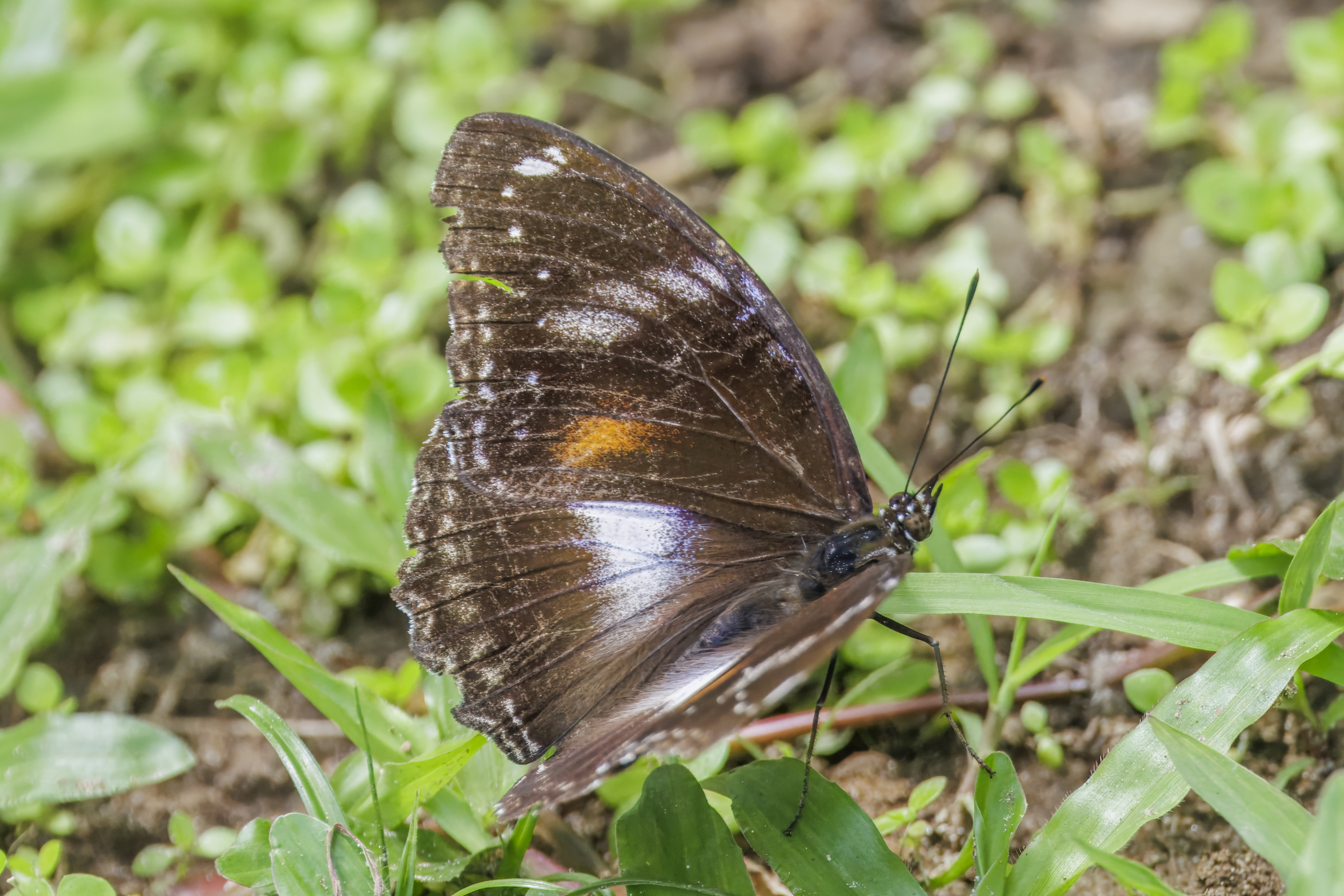
female H. b. naresii
Fiji

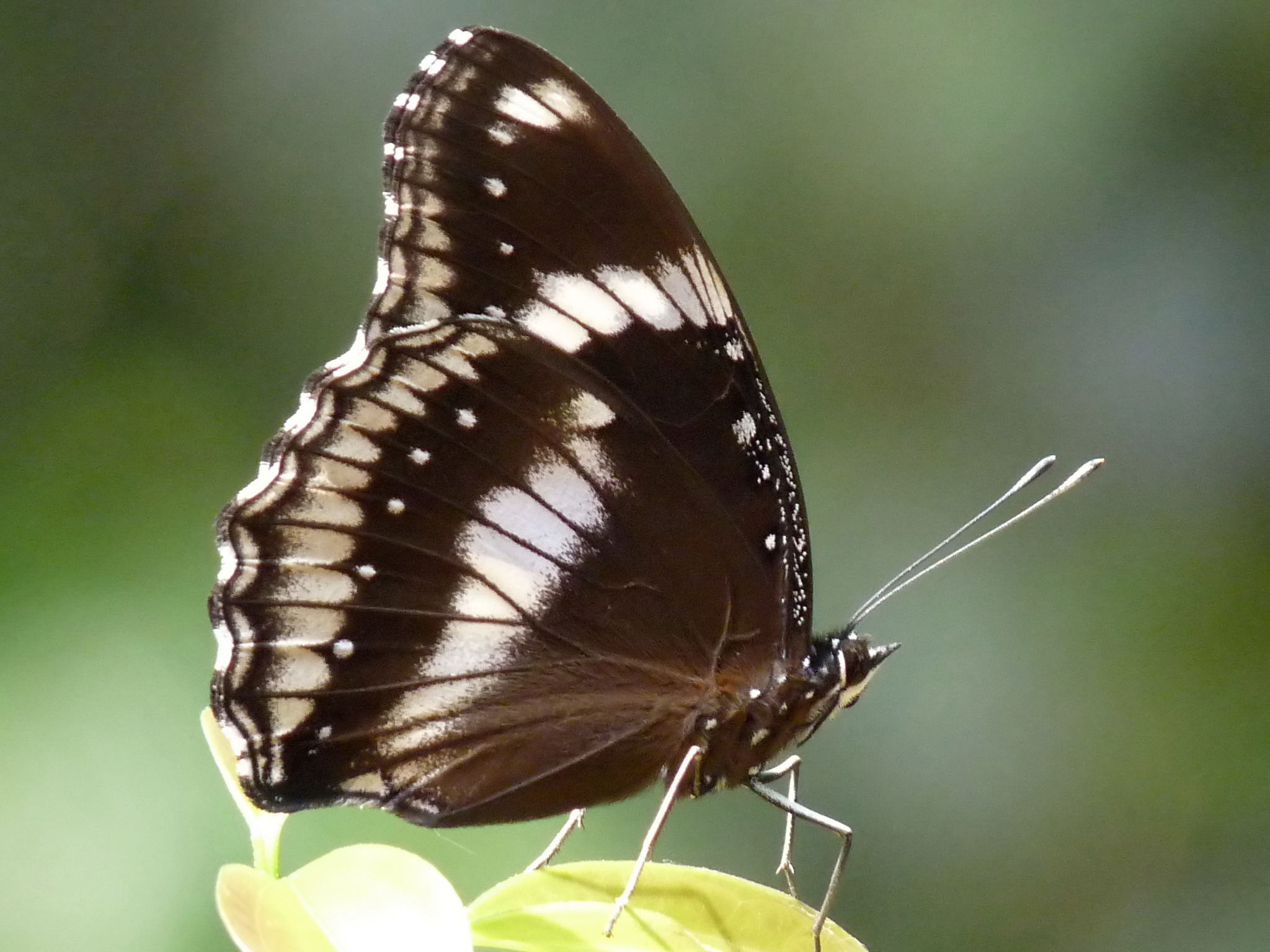
Male, underside

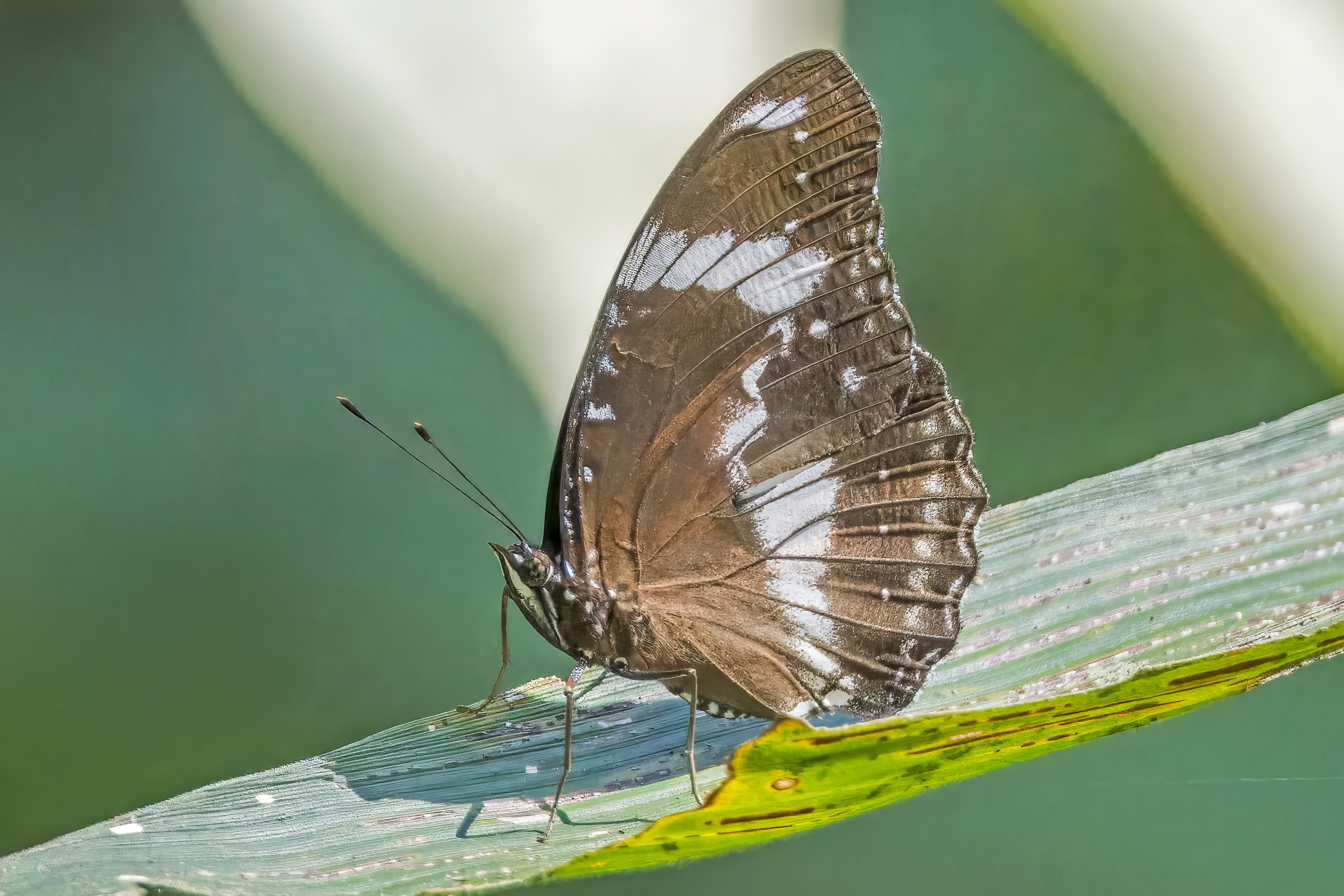
H. b. philippensis
Luzon, Philippines

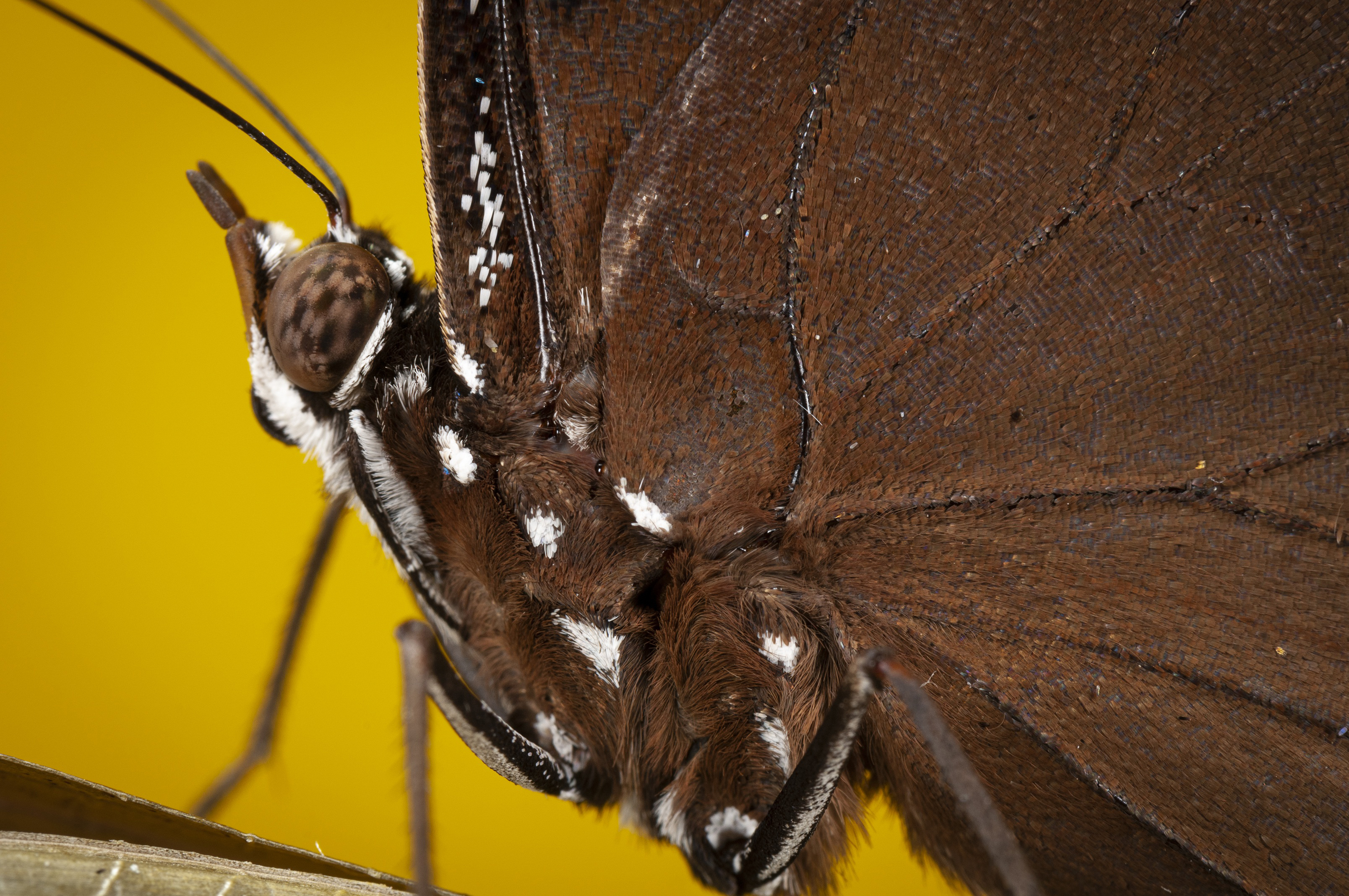
Hypolimnas bolina, Adult

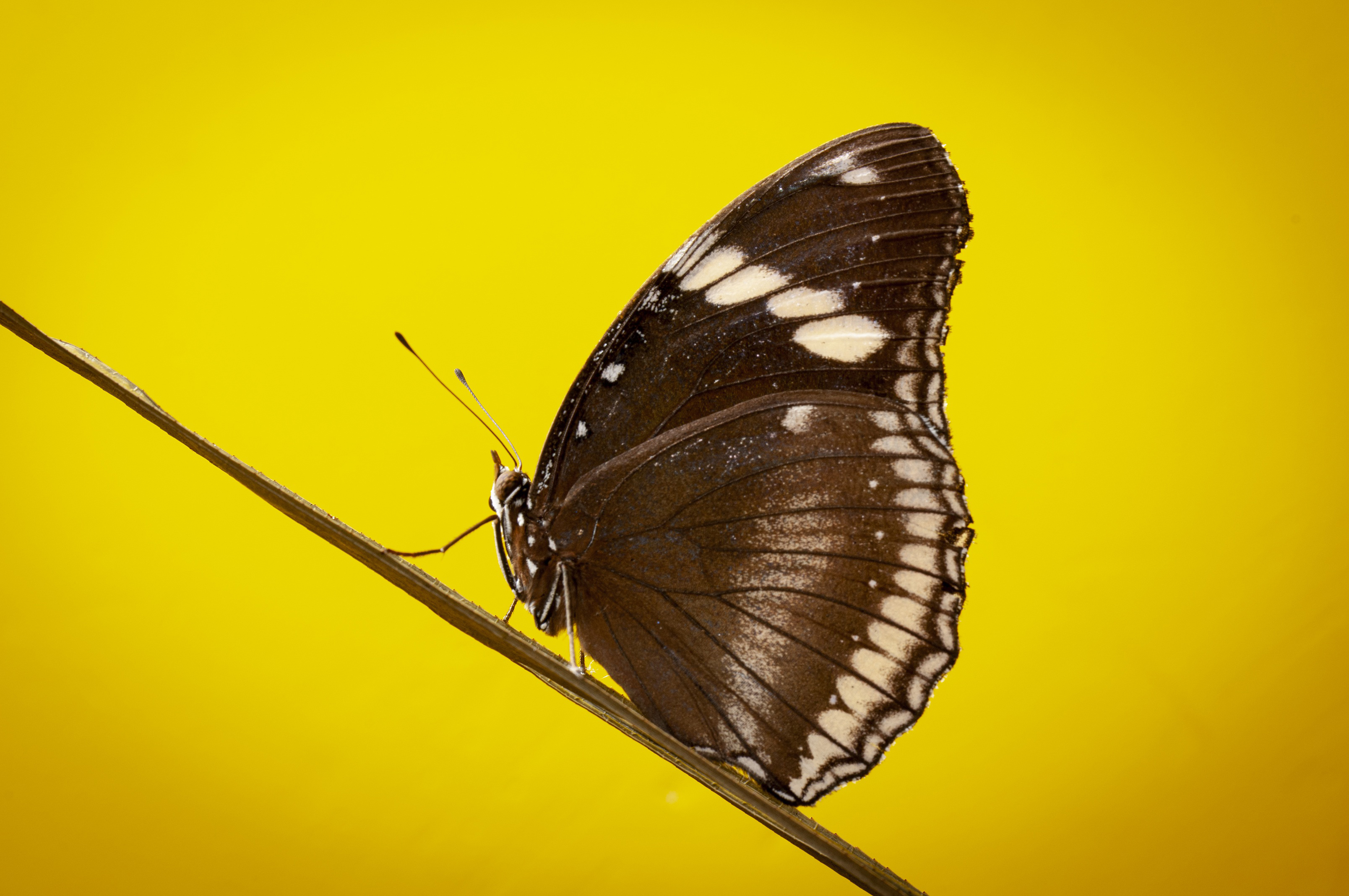
Hypolimnas bolina, Adult

== Distribution ==
H. bolina is found in Madagascar in the west, through to South and Southeast Asia, Cambodia, the South Pacific islands (French Polynesia, Tonga, Tuvalu, Samoa, Vanuatu, and Fiji), and occurs in parts of Australia as far south as Victoria during summer and autumn, Japan, Taiwan, and New Zealand. Appearances in New Zealand appear to be linked with favourable winds during April–June migratory periods in Australia, with the butterfly being recorded in 1956, 1971, and 1995. However, there are iNaturalist records for New Zealand for every year since 2013. No populations have established locally in New Zealand.

== Habitat ==
H. bolina is a generally common butterfly across most tropical and sub-tropical habitat types, including wet/dry woodland (such as tropical savanna), rainforest, and shrubland. It is a common visitor to suburban back yards and other areas of human disturbance. In the Australian tropics, H. bolina is particularly common along tracks, streambeds, and the corridors formed between remnant gallery forest and cultivated sugar cane fields. Both sexes are invariably found in association with one or more larval hostplant species, especially disturbance species such as Synedrella nodiflora, Sida rhombifolia, and Commelina cyanea.

== Mimicry ==
To the west the female is monomorphic, mimicking species of the oriental and Australasian danaid genus Euploea. Eastwards H. bolina is frequently polymorphic and most forms are then non-mimetic. In areas where it resembles Euploea the butterfly has usually been designated a Batesian mimic.

== Life cycle and ecology ==
Males are notably territorial. Individuals are known to return to defend the same location for up to 54 days, with site fidelity increasing with age. Territories that enhance the visual detection of adult females are preferred. Males primarily utilize sit-and-wait strategy for locating potential mates.

Females are usually found gliding close to the ground in southern areas. Unlike that of H. alimena, these females possess a strong preference towards exaggerated visual signals (dorsal blue coloration).

Unlike congenerics such as Hypolimnas anomala, female H. bolina most often lay one or two eggs at a time. These are typically laid on the leaf underside. Early season (post-diapause) females in the Australian wet-dry tropics target freshly germinated seedlings of their favoured host in this region, Synedrella nodiflora. Eggs hatch after 3 days under a constant incubation temperature of ca. 25 degrees C. Newly hatched larva first consume their egg shell before feeding on the leaf upon which they were laid. Later larval instars are highly mobile and readily disperse in search of new host foliage. Individuals rarely pupate on (or in the immediate vicinity of) their host plant.

=== Host plants ===
Race bolina breeds on Sida rhombifolia, Elatostemma cuneatum, Portulaca oleracea, Laportea interrupta, Triumfetta pentandra, and Asystasia species.

Other hosts include Elatostema cuneatum, Fleurya interrupta, Pseuderanthemum variabile, Ipomoea batatas, Alternanthera denticulata, and Synedrella nodiflora. Caterpillars accept leaves of Pipiturus argenteus. They are also known to feed on Urtica dioica and Malva species. While in New Zealand, adult butterflies have been observed feeding on the nectar of Lantana, Grevillea, Hebe, Symphyotrichum novi-belgii, and Solanum muricatum plants.

=== Eggs ===
The eggs are a pale, glassy green with longitudinal ridges except on the top.

=== Caterpillar ===
After about four days the eggs hatch. The caterpillars immediately disperse. They are black with an orange head. The last segment is also orange. The head bears a pair of long branched black horns. The body surface is also covered with long, branched, orangish black spines. These spines look whitish and transparent immediately after moulting, but soon become the usual orange. In later instars the spiracles are surrounded by thin, dirty orange rings. Infection by Wolbachia bacteria is known to exclusively kill male specimens.

=== Pupa ===
The pupa is suspended by just one point. It is brown with a grey tinge on the wings. The abdominal segments have distinct tubercles. The surface of the pupa is rough. The butterfly emerges after seven to eight days as pupae (female development is always a bit longer).

== Recent evolutionary changes ==
On the Samoan Islands of Upolu and Savai'i, a Wolbachia strain wBol1 had been killing the male members of Hypolimnas bolina. The problem was so severe that by 2001, males made up only 1% of the population. However, in 2007, it was reported that within a span of just 10 generations (about 5 years), the males had evolved to develop immunity to the parasite, and the male population increased to nearly 40%. This evolutionary event involved changes at a single genomic region on chromosome 25, and represents one of the fastest examples of natural selection observed to date in natural populations. Ed Yong has written a popular science account of this highly unusual evolutionary event. Wolbachia derived from wBol1 have recently been observed in H. bolina from Java, Indonesia, to be insensitive to suppression, carrying an additional prophage element with additional male-killing determinants. This observation indicated an escalating arms-race may be operating in this species

== Subspecies ==
Listed alphabetically:

- H. b. bolina (Linnaeus, 1758) – (Sumatra, Java, Lesser Sunda Islands, western Borneo, Sulawesi, Salayar, Kabaena, Galla, Banggai, Sula, Maluku, New Guinea, Solomon Islands, Australia, New Caledonia)
- H. b. constans (Butler, 1875) – (Tasmania?)
- H. b. enganica Fruhstorfer, 1904 – (Engano Island)
- H. b. gigas (Oberthür, 1879) – (Sangihe)
- H. b. incommoda Butler, 1879
- H. b. inconstans Butler, 1873 – (Navigator Islands)
- H. b. jacintha (Drury, 1773)
- H. b. jaluita Fruhstorfer, 1903
- H. b. kezia (Butler) – (Formosa)
- H. b. kraimoku (Eschscholtz, 1821) – (Lifu)
- H. b. labuana Butler, 1879 – (Labuan)
- H. b. lisianassa (Cramer, 1779) – (Moluccas)
- H. b. listeri Butler, 1888 – (Christmas Island)
- H. b. montrouzieri (Butler) – (Woodlark, Fergusson, Trobriand Islands)
- H. b. naresii Butler, 1883 – (Fiji)
- H. b. nerina (Fabricius, 1775) – (Timor - Kai, Aru, Waigeu, West Irian - Papua, northern Australia - eastern Victoria, Bismarck Archipelago, Solomon Islands, New Zealand)
- H. b. pallescens (Butler) – (Fiji)
- H. b. philippensis (Butler, 1874) – (Philippines)
- H. b. pulchra (Butler) – (New Caledonia)
- H. b. rarik Eschscholtz, 1821) – (Lifu)
