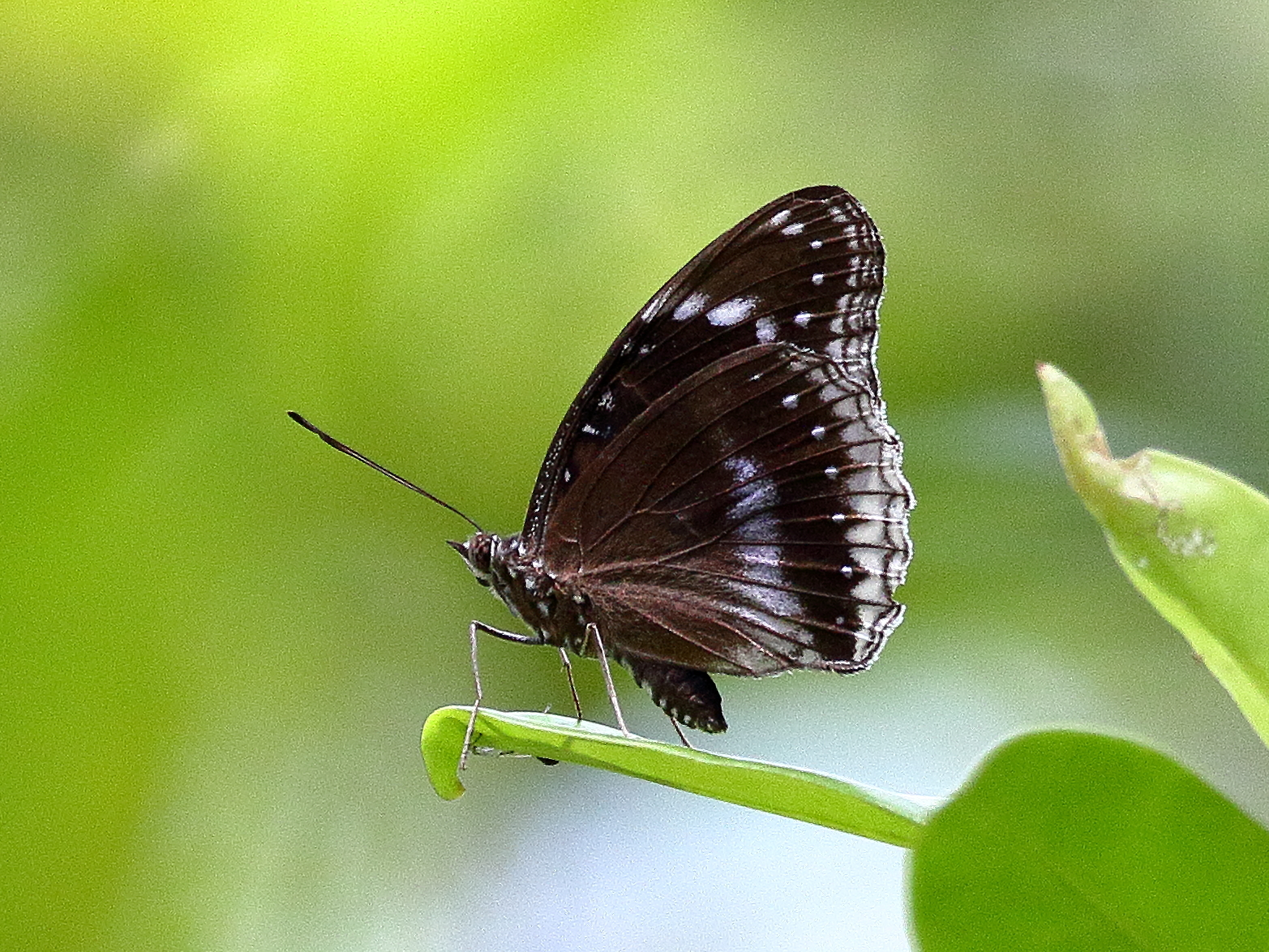

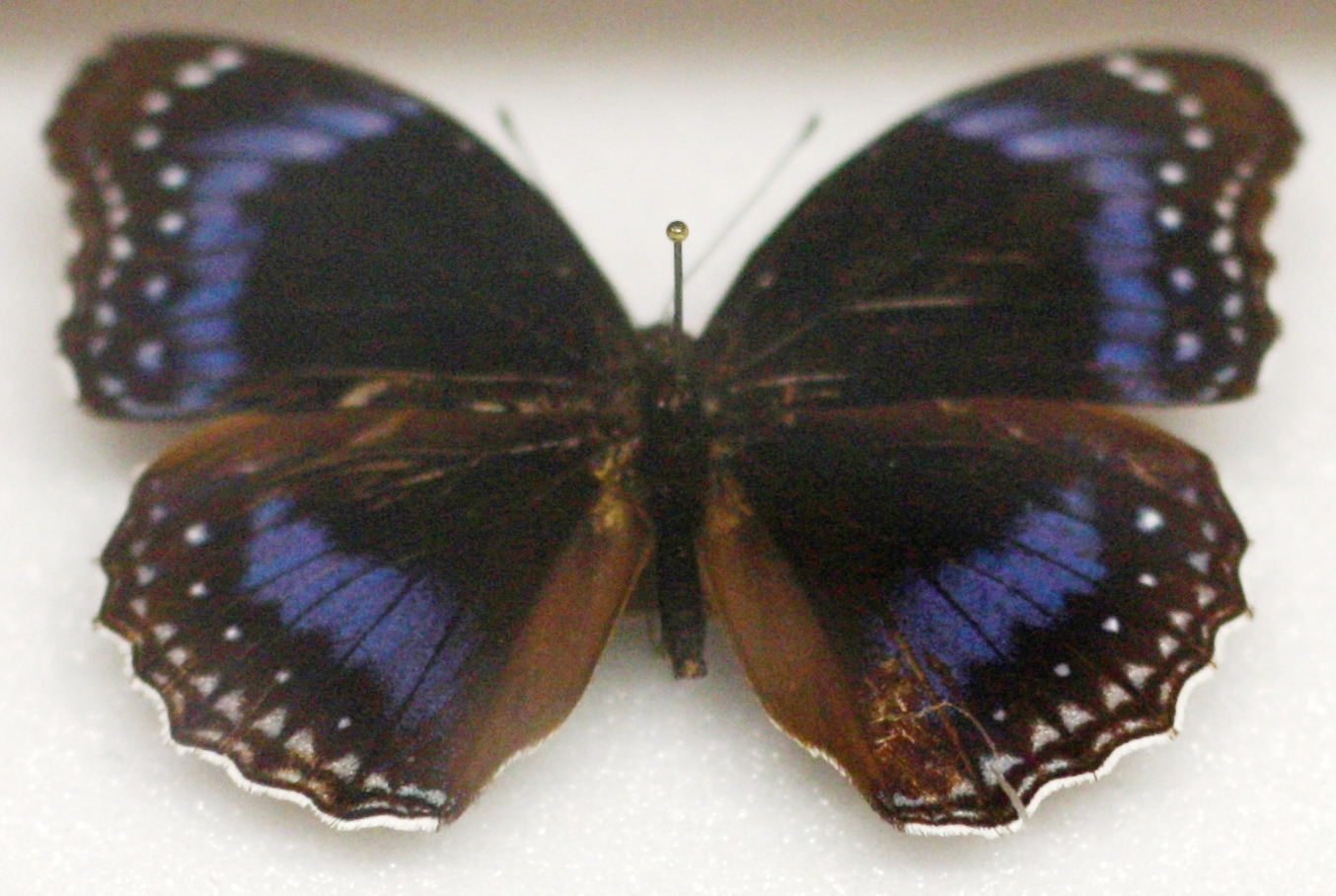

Scientific classification
- Kingdom: Animalia
- Phylum: Arthropoda
- Class: Insecta
- Order: Lepidoptera
- Family: Nymphalidae
- Genus: Hypolimnas
- Species: H. alimena

Binomial name
- Hypolimnas alimena (Linnaeus, 1758)

Subspecies
- See text

Synonyms
- Papilio alimena Linnaeus, 1758; Papilio alimena Linnaeus, 1764; Papilio porphyria Cramer, [1780]; Papilio velleda Stoll, [1781]; Hypolimnas alimena f. coelia Fruhstorfer; Diadema polymena C. & R. Felder, [1867]; Hypolimnas forbesii Butler, 1883; Diadema alimena var. salvini Kirsch, 1885; Hypolimnas eremita Butler, 1883; Hypolimnas lamina Fruhstorfer, 1903; Hypolimnas darwinensis Waterhouse & Lyell, 1914; Hypolimnas inexpectata var. kuramata Ribbe, 1898; Hypolimnas diphridas Fruhstorfer, 1912; Diadema fuliginensis Mathew, 1887

= Hypolimnas alimena =

Species of butterfly

Hypolimnas alimena, the blue-banded eggfly, is a species of butterfly in the family Nymphalidae. It is found in the Solomon Islands, Indonesia (Aru Islands, Irian Jaya, Kei Islands, Maluku ,Timor), New Guinea and Australia (the coast of New South Wales, the Northern Territory and Queensland).

== Description ==
The wingspan of H. alimena is 80–90 mm. The ground colour of the wings is black with a row of white dots and a blue band.

These butterflies resemble closely to related species,H. bolina.The males exhibit less visually elaborate structural coloration, as compared. The dorsal blue coloration of this butterfly has weak iridescence, and is not very bright. This is because it arises from a simpler nanoscale surface structure, unlike the more complex nanoscale multilayer-arrays structure of H. bolina, which gives it a brighter sheen and saturation.

== Behavior ==
The males of this species primarily utilize a sit-and wait-strategy for locating mates. This behavior is similar to Hypolimnas bolina. However, unlike H. bolina, these males do not engage in extended aerial disputes for the territorial defence. Both of their flight morphology is strikingly similar, and does not show any significant differences in terms of strength, as is noticeable by their similar thoracic mass. Another characteristic shared by the two species is possessing a higher relative flight musculature, lower wing loading, and a lower aspect ratio, compared to their conspecific female specimens. However these traits contribute to the sexual dimorphism observed within the species, it only suggests partial match with the typical observations of sexual selection.

The females show no notable preference for males with variable dorsal blue coloration and hues, unless it is completely or mostly absent. This low drive towards exaggerated visual signals is specific to this species, unlike others in the same genus.

The larvae feed on Pseuderanthemum variabile, Asystasia gangetica and Graptophyllum pictum.

== Subspecies ==
- Hypolimnas alimena afra Fruhstorfer, 1903 (Trobriand Islands)
- Hypolimnas alimena alimena (Ambon, Serang, Saparua)
- Hypolimnas alimena bandana Fruhstorfer, 1912 (Banda Island)
- Hypolimnas alimena bateia Fruhstorfer, 1915 (Yule Island, Yela Island)
- Hypolimnas alimena curicta Fruhstorfer, 1912 (Noemfoor Island)
- Hypolimnas alimena darwinensis Waterhouse & Lyell, 1914 (Northern Territory)
- Hypolimnas alimena diffusa Howarth, 1962 (Bellona Island)
- Hypolimnas alimena eligia Fruhstorfer, 1912 (Bachan, Halmahera, Morotai, Ternate)
- Hypolimnas alimena eremita Butler, 1883 (West Irian to eastern New Guinea)
- Hypolimnas alimena forbesi Butler, 1883 (Timor to Tanimbar)
- Hypolimnas alimena fuliginescens (Mathew, 1887) (Ugi Island)
- Hypolimnas alimena heteromorpha Röber, 1891 (Kai Island)
- Hypolimnas alimena inexpectata Godman & Salvin, 1877 (Bismarck Archipelago)
- Hypolimnas alimena lamina Fruhstorfer, 1903 (Torres Strait Islands, Cape York to Gympie)
- Hypolimnas alimena libateia Howarth, 1962 (Rennell Island)
- Hypolimnas alimena libisonia Fruhstorfer, 1912 (Papua New Guinea)
- Hypolimnas alimena manusi Rothschild, 1915 (Admiralty Islands)
- Hypolimnas alimena obsolescens Fruhstorfer, 1903 (Fergusson Island)
- Hypolimnas alimena polymena (C. & R. Felder, [1867]) (Aru)
- Hypolimnas alimena remigia Fruhstorfer, 1912 (Obi)
- Hypolimnas alimena salomonis Ribbe, 1897 (Bougainville, Shortland Islands, New Georgia Group)
- Hypolimnas alimena saturnia Fruhstorfer, 1903 (Waigeu)
- Hypolimnas alimena senia Fruhstorfer, 1912 (Buru)
- Hypolimnas alimena ysabela Fruhstorfer, 1912 (Santa Isabel)
