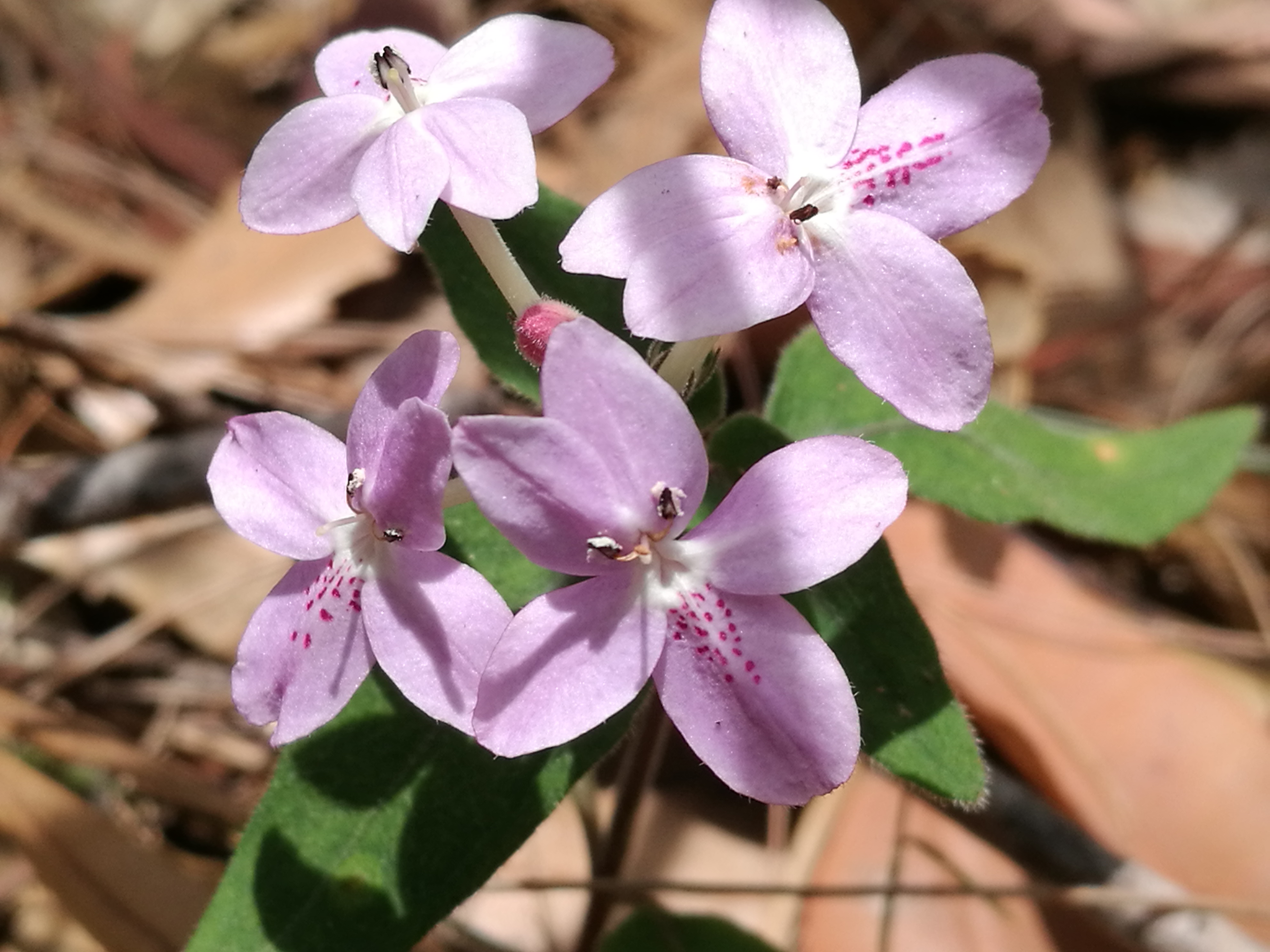
- At McKay Reserve, Palm Beach, NSW, January 2018

Conservation status
- Least Concern (NCA)

Scientific classification
- Kingdom: Plantae
- Clade: Tracheophytes
- Clade: Angiosperms
- Clade: Eudicots
- Clade: Asterids
- Order: Lamiales
- Family: Acanthaceae
- Genus: Pseuderanthemum
- Species: P. variabile

Binomial name
- Pseuderanthemum variabile (R.Br.) Radlk.

Synonyms
- 18 synonyms: Chrestienia elegans Montrouz.; Chrestienia montana Montrouz.; Eranthemum micranthum Nees; Eranthemum pratense Pancher ex Beauvis.; Eranthemum variabile R.Br.; Eranthemum variabile var. dentatum Nees; Eranthemum variabile var. integrifolium Nees; Eranthemum variabile var. lineare Nees; Eranthemum variabile var. molle Benth.; Pseuderanthemum grandiflorum f. glabrescens Domin; Pseuderanthemum grandiflorum var. longiflorum Domin; Pseuderanthemum grandiflorum var. molle (Benth.) Domin; Pseuderanthemum grandiflorum var. perglandulosum Domin; Pseuderanthemum grandiflorum var. pluriflorum Domin; Pseuderanthemum grandiflorum f. subrosulatum Domin; Pseuderanthemum microcarpum Domin; Pseuderanthemum ultralineare Domin; Siphoneranthemum variabile (R.Br.) Kuntze

= Pseuderanthemum variabile =

Pastel flower

Species of flowering plant

Pseuderanthemum variabile, commonly known as pastel flower or love flower in its native range, or night and afternoon in the US, is a small perennial herb in the family Acanthaceae which is native to Australia, Papua New Guinea and New Caledonia. It can be an unwelcome nuisance in orchid nurseries in Australia.

== Description ==
Pseuderanthemum variabile is a creeping herb with a highly variable appearance, growing up to 30 cm (12 in) high, all parts of which may be pubescent. The wiry stems are around 1–2 millimetres (0.04–0.08 in) wide. The leaves are lanceolate to ovate in shape with entire margins, and their arrangement is opposite and decussate. They measure up to 7 cm (2.8 in) long by 4 cm (1.6 in) wide with petioles up to 30 mm (1.2 in) long, and have from 3 to 6 lateral veins either side of the midrib.

The leaf colour varies greatly. The upper surface is usually dark green to mid-green, but may have varying amounts of light grey or (rarely) purple patterning. The lower surface of the leaf is usually light green but may also be purple or dark red (see gallery for examples).

The inflorescence is produced from the terminal axil, and the zygomorphic flowers have five petals. Two petals are smaller than the others and are usually uppermost. They measure around 7 by 4 mm (0.28 by 0.16 in) and overlap each other slightly. Two more are held perpendicular to the first pair, one on either side, and the last (and largest) petal is opposite the first pair. This one measures about 10 by 6 mm (0.39 by 0.24 in) and is often decorated with a variable number of small purple spots. The petals may be any colour shade from white to pink or lilac.

The fruit is a capsule up to 15 mm (0.59 in) long, and may be pubescent or glabrous.

== Taxonomy ==
This species was first described as Eranthemum variabile by Scottish botanist Robert Brown in his book Prodromus Florae Novae Hollandiae et Insulae Van Diemen, published in 1810. In 1883, German taxonomist and botanist Ludwig Radlkofer transferred a number of Eranthemum species, including this one, to the new genus Pseuderanthemum.

== Distribution and habitat ==
This species is found in Papua New Guinea, eastern parts of New South Wales and Queensland in Australia, and in New Caledonia. It may occupy a number of forest types in Australia, most often rainforest and wet sclerophyll forest, but also woodlands, open forest and deciduous vine thickets.

It has been introduced to Florida, South Carolina and Puerto Rico.

== Ecology ==
It is the food plant for caterpillars of a number of butterflies in the family Nymphalidae, including Doleschallia bisaltide, Hypolimnas alimena, Hypolimnas bolina, Hypolimnas misippus and Junonia orithya.

== Conservation ==
This species is listed by the Queensland Department of Environment and Science as least concern. As of 29 April 2022, it has not been assessed by the IUCN.

== Cultivation and uses ==
It is an attractive addition to gardens, and can be used as a feature, a ground cover, or a gap filler in a rockery. It is easily grown from seed or cuttings.

In Australia, it is reported by some orchid nurseries as a pest, as it often appears in pots and may be difficult to eradicate.

== Gallery ==
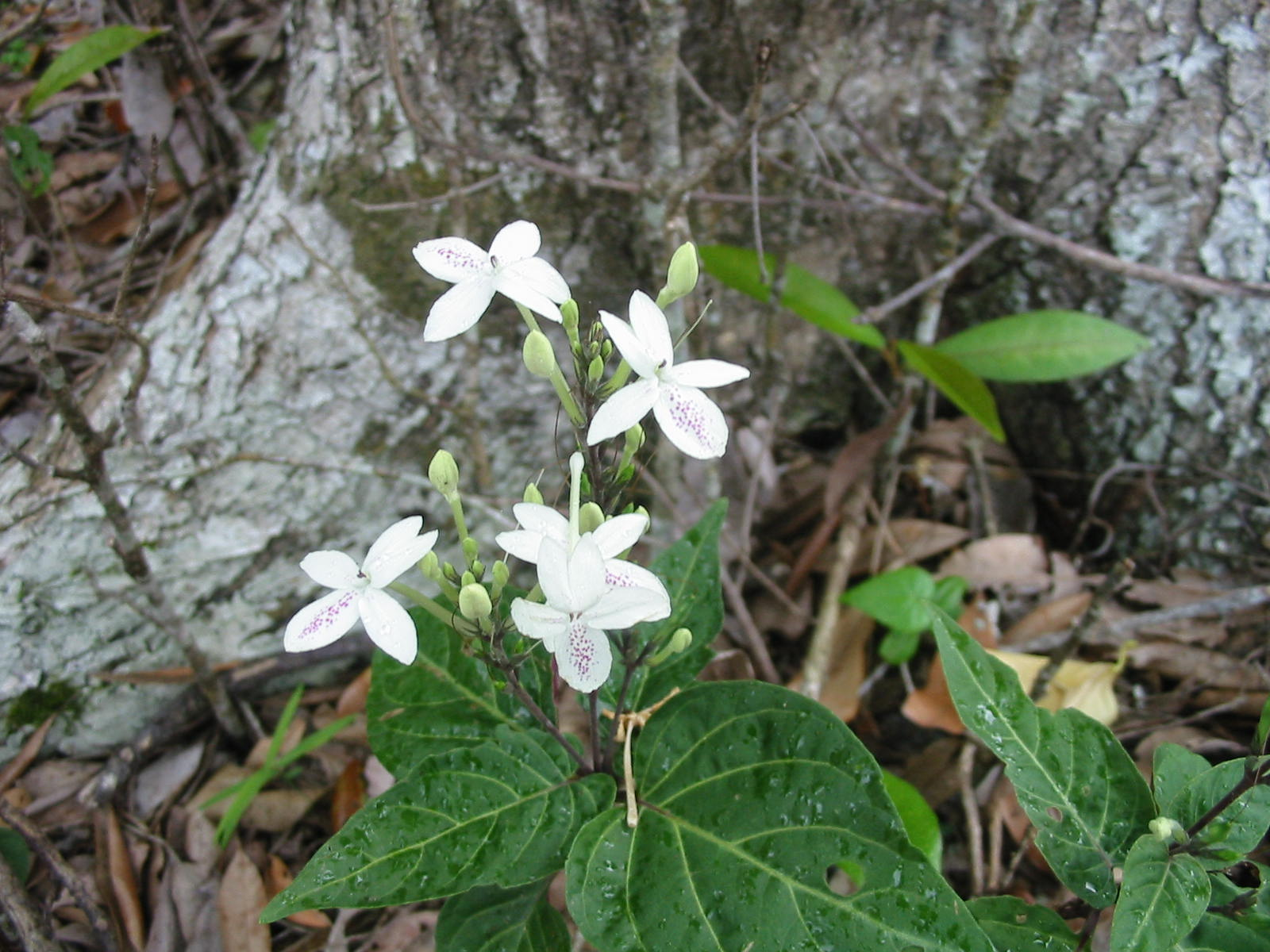

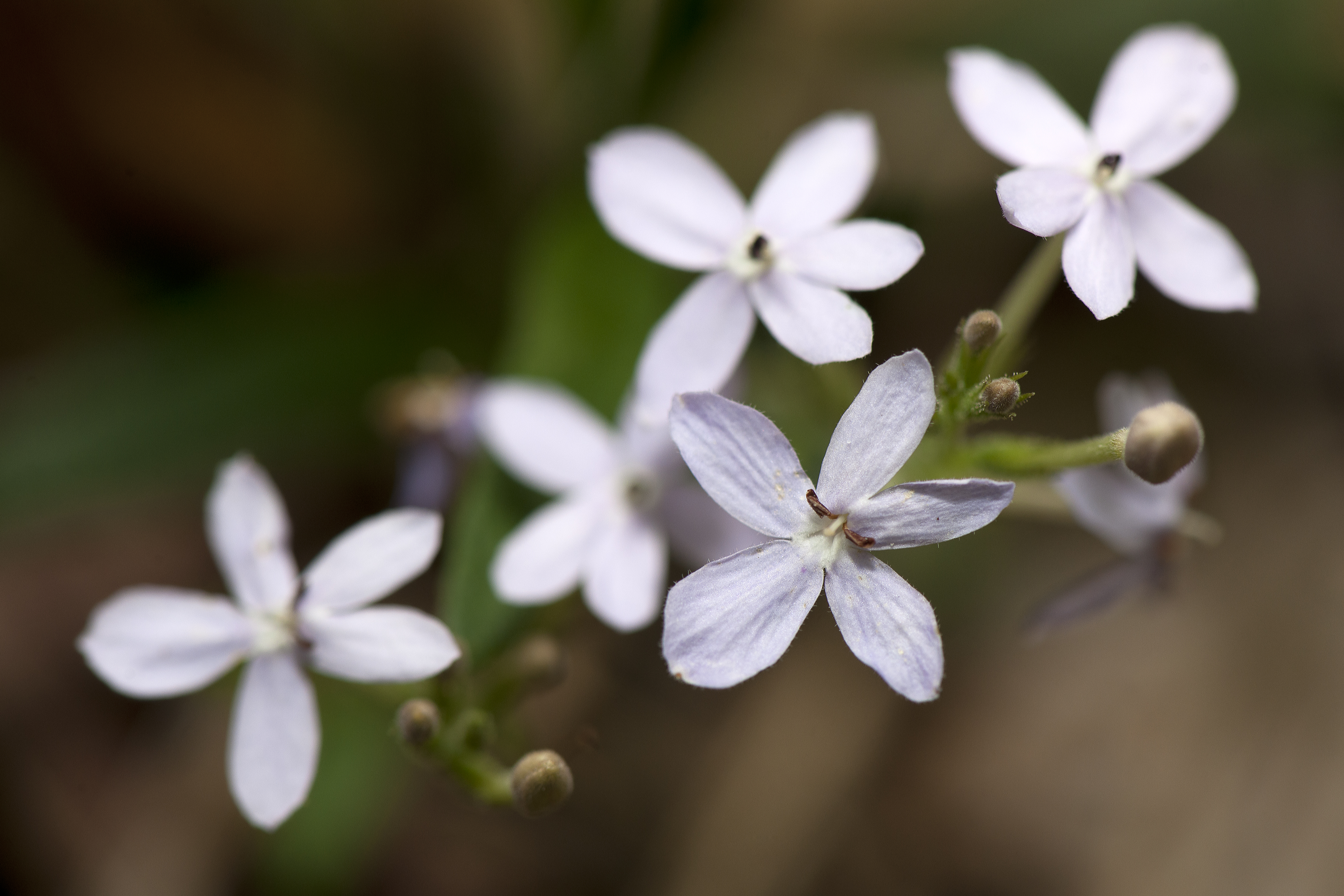
Whites Hill Reserve, Queensland. February 2012

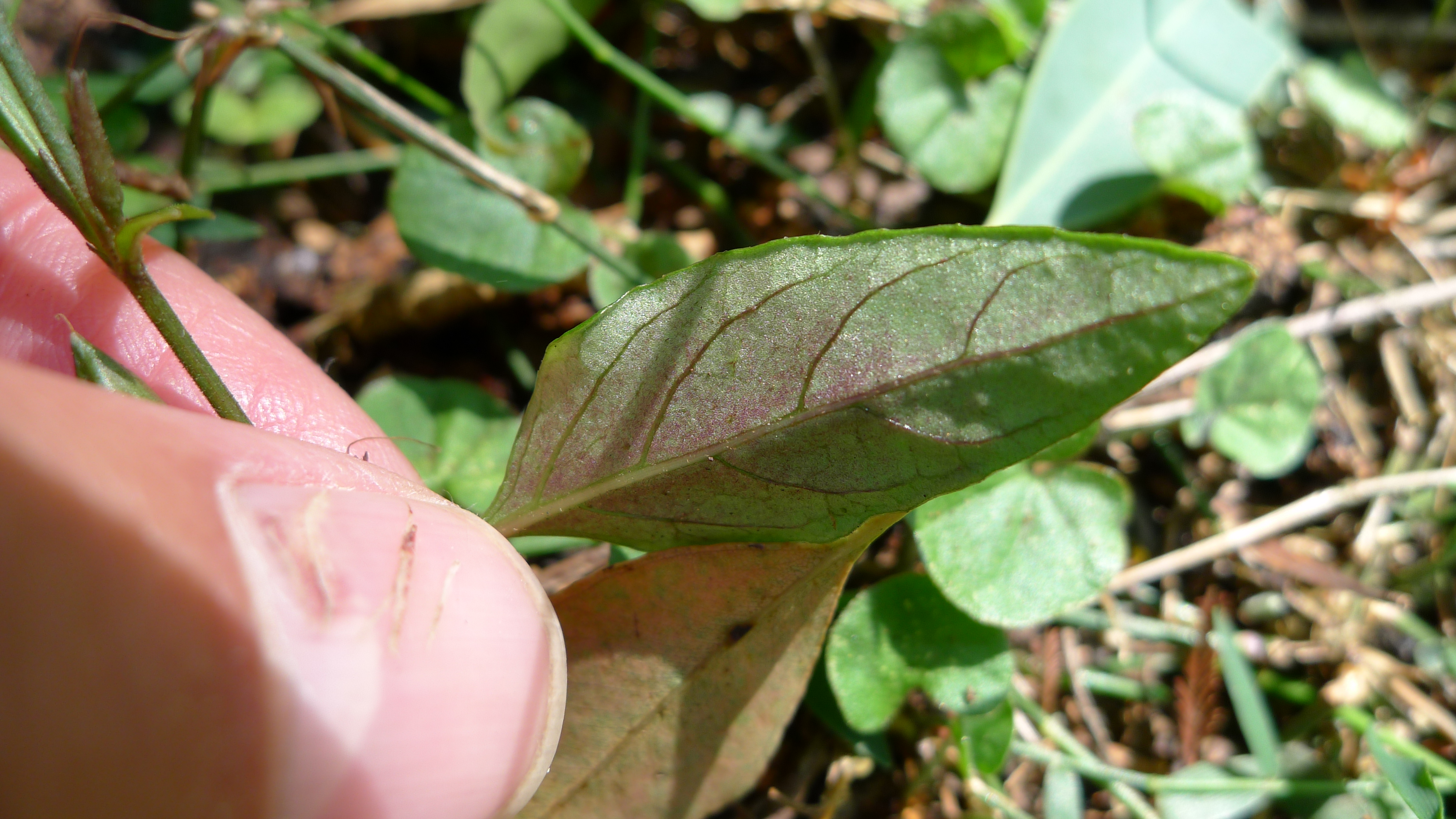
Underside with mild colouration

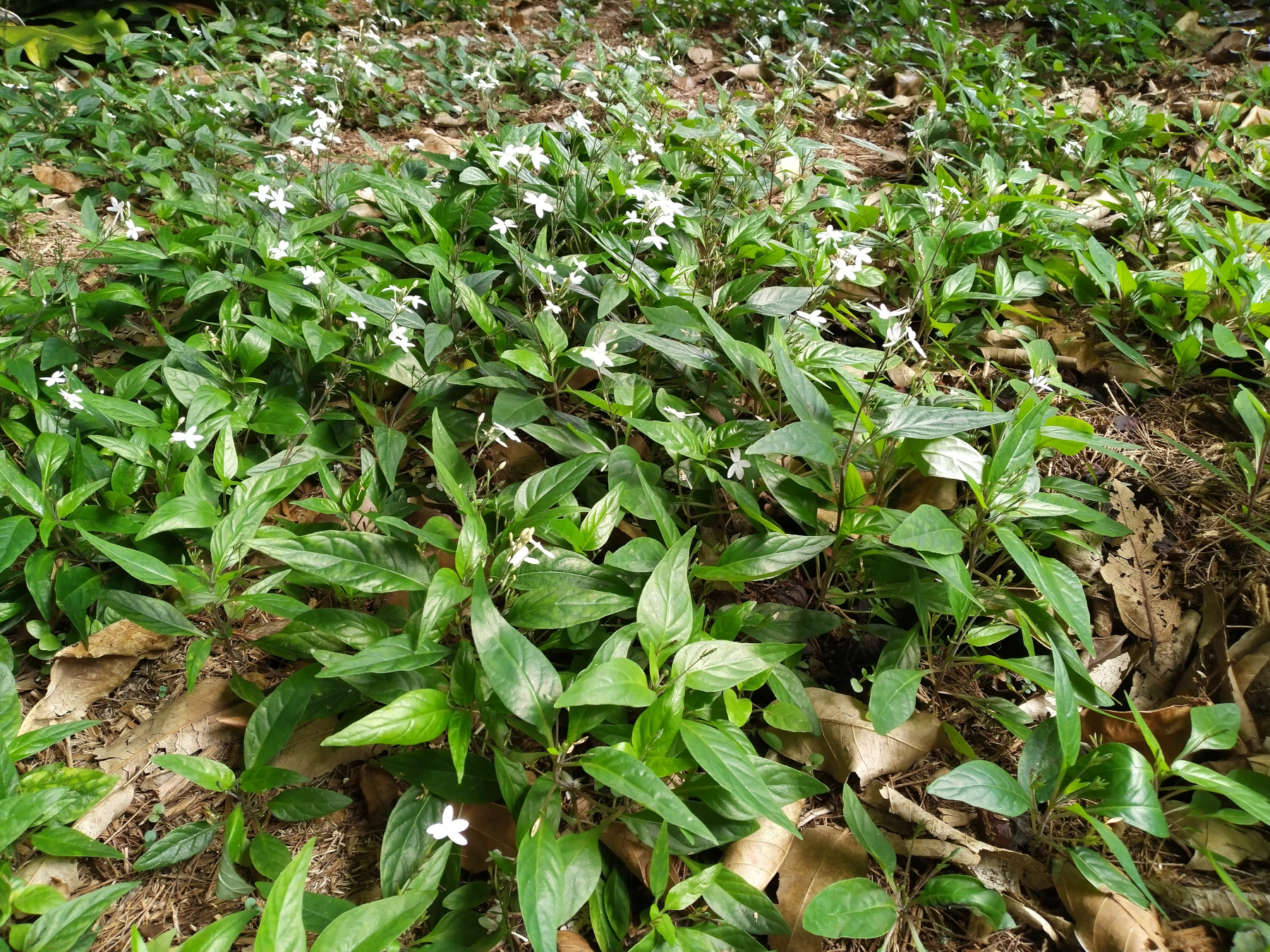
Forming a groundcover at Cairns Railway Station, Queensland, December 2020

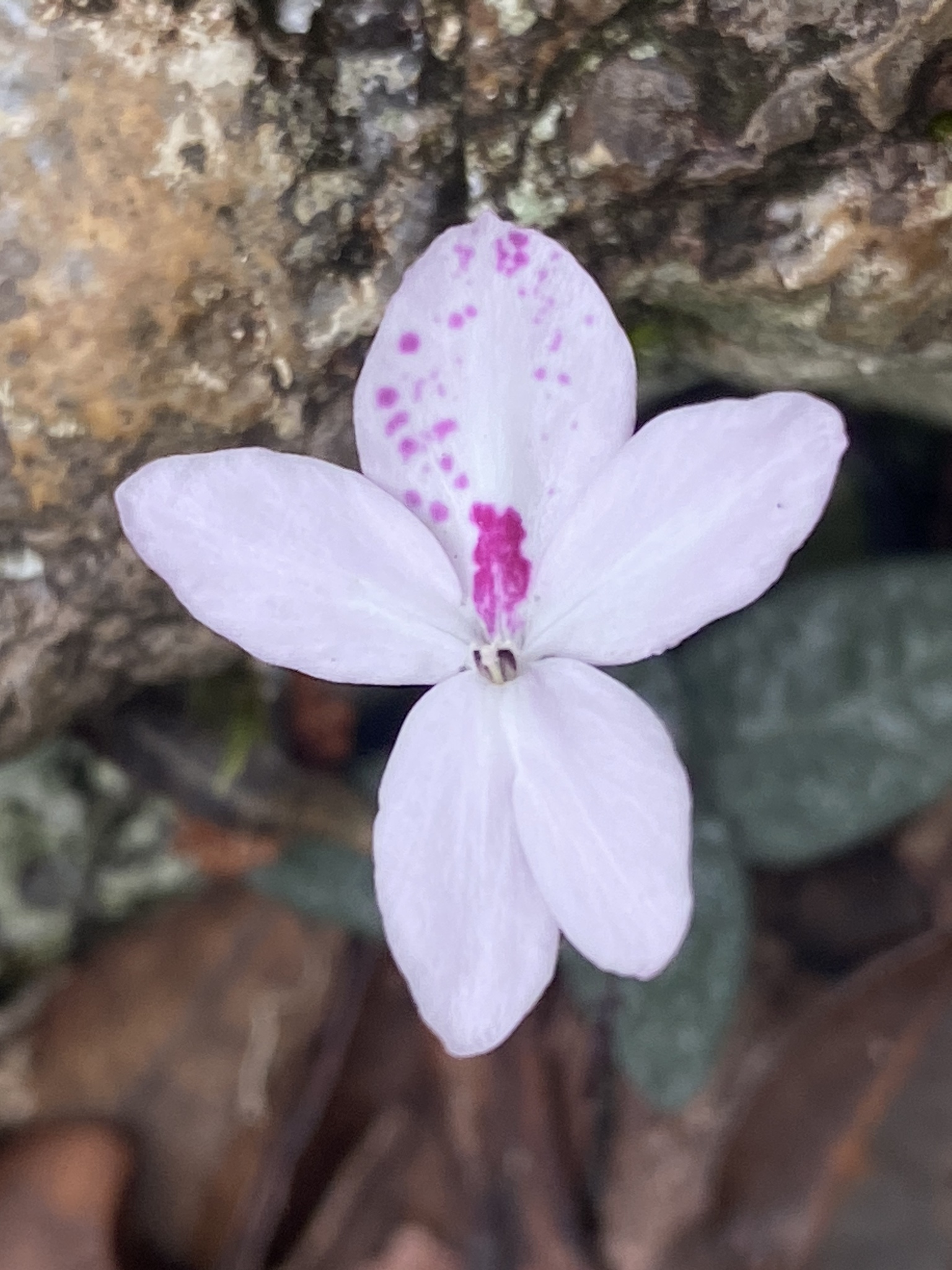
Flower with spots, Barron Gorge Queensland, March 2022

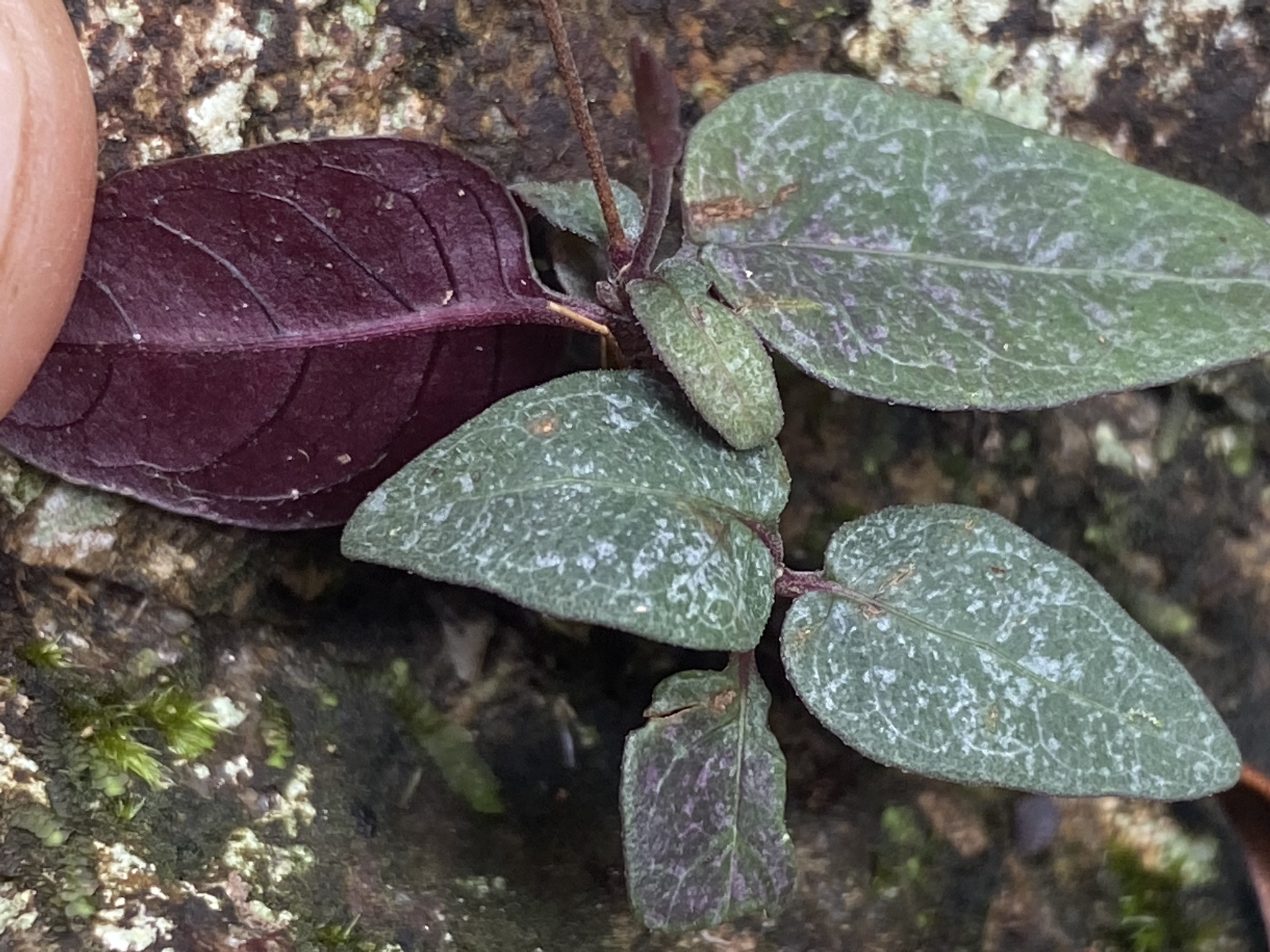
Leaves with random patterning above and dark purple below. Barron Gorge Queensland, March 2022
