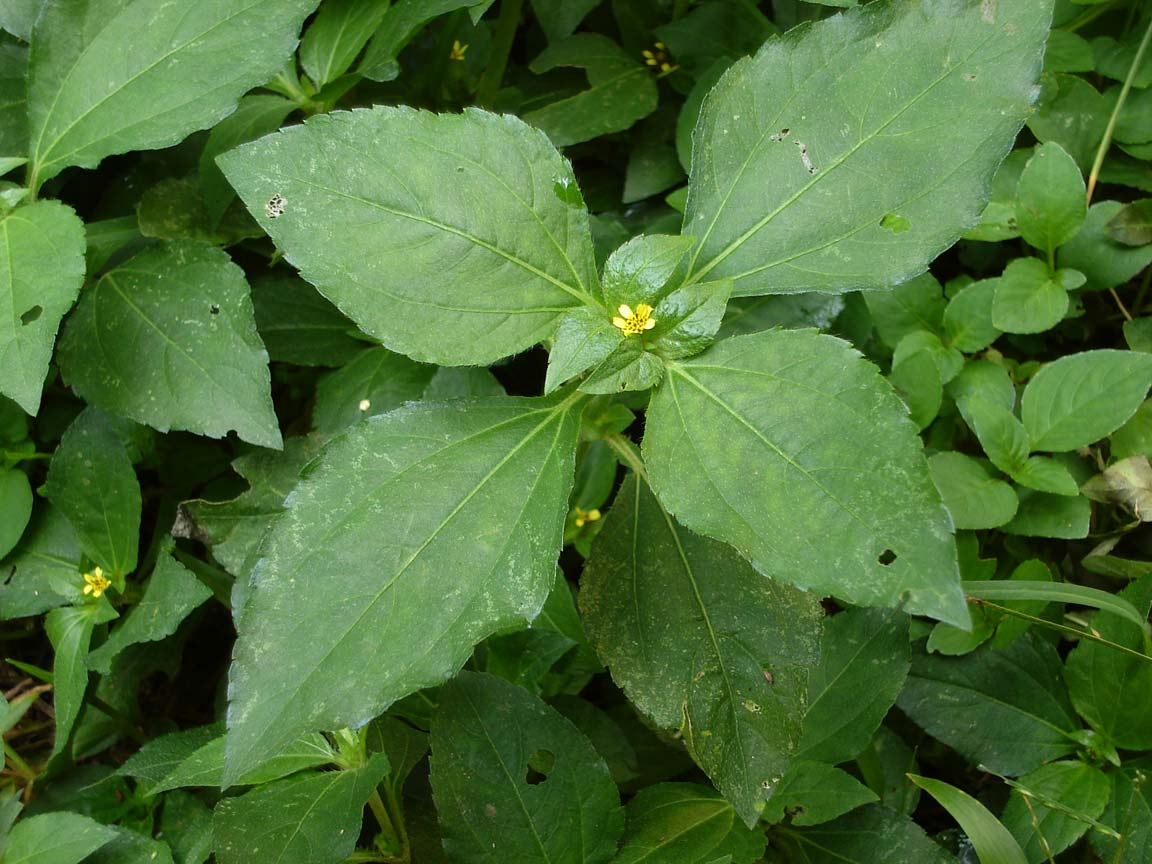

Scientific classification
- Kingdom: Plantae
- Clade: Tracheophytes
- Clade: Angiosperms
- Clade: Eudicots
- Clade: Asterids
- Order: Asterales
- Family: Asteraceae
- Subfamily: Asteroideae
- Tribe: Heliantheae
- Subtribe: Ecliptinae
- Genus: Synedrella; Gaertn.
- Species: S. nodiflora

Binomial name
- Synedrella nodiflora (L.) Gaertn.

Synonyms
- Ucacou Adans.; Verbesina nodiflora L.; Eclipta latifolia L.f.; Blainvillea latifolia (L.f.) DC.; Ecliptica latifolia (L.f.) Kuntze; Wedelia cryptocephala Peter; Ucacou nodiflorum (L.) Hitchc.

= Synedrella =

Genus of plants

Synedrella is a genus of flowering plants in the family Asteraceae.

It contains only one known species, Synedrella nodiflora, native to South America, Central America, Mexico, the West Indies, and Florida. It is naturalized in much of Asia, northern Australia, some Pacific Islands, and tropical Africa. Nodeweed and Cinderella weed are common names for this species.

== Formerly included ==
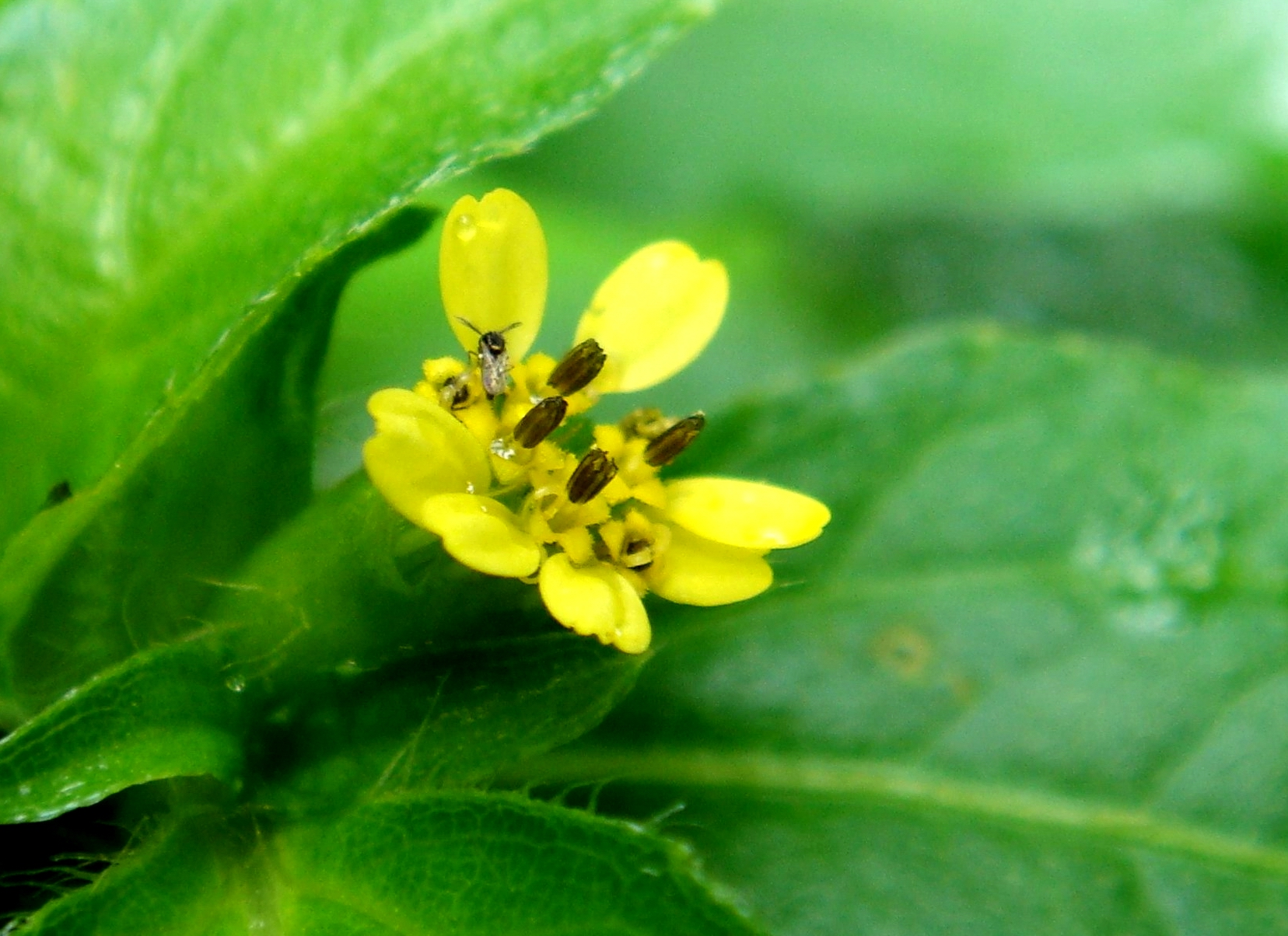
Synedrella nodiflora in chalakudy

- Synedrella peduncularis Benth., syn of Schizoptera peduncularis (Benth.) S.F.Blake
- Synedrella vialis (Less.) A.Gray, syn of Calyptocarpus vialis Less.
