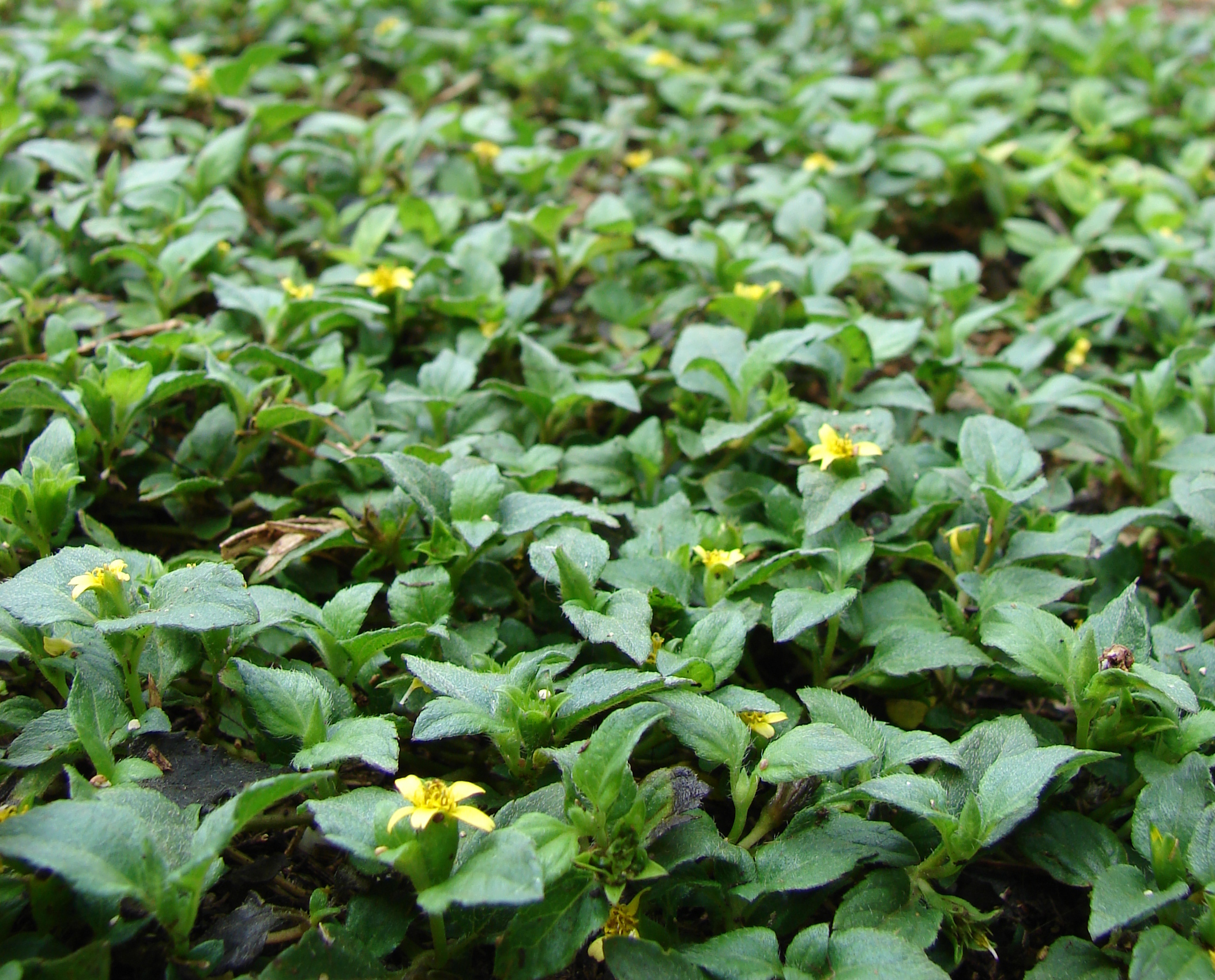

Conservation status
- Secure (NatureServe)

Scientific classification
- Kingdom: Plantae
- Clade: Embryophytes
- Clade: Tracheophytes
- Clade: Spermatophytes
- Clade: Angiosperms
- Clade: Eudicots
- Clade: Asterids
- Order: Asterales
- Family: Asteraceae
- Tribe: Heliantheae
- Genus: Calyptocarpus
- Species: C. vialis

Binomial name
- Calyptocarpus vialis Less., 1832

Synonyms
- Blainvillea tampicana (DC.) Benth. & Hook.f. ex Hemsl.; Calyptocarpus tampicanus (DC.) Small; Oligogyne tampicana DC.; Synedrella vialis (Less.) A.Gray; Zexmenia hispidula Buckley

= Calyptocarpus vialis =

Species of plant

Calyptocarpus vialis is a species of flowering plant in the family Asteraceae. Common names for C. vialis include straggler daisy, horseherb, lawnflower, and creeping Cinderella-weed. It is native to south Texas, Mexico, Belize, Venezuela, and the Caribbean. It has also been introduced east of Texas, Argentina, Hawaii, India, Java, Australia, and Taiwan. It is one of only three species in the genus Calyptocarpus.

== Description ==
Its opposite leaves are typically 1–3 cm (0.39–1.18 in) long and triangular to lanceolate in shape. It bears heads of yellow flowers, with around 10–20 disc florets and three to eight ray florets, the laminae of the latter around 2–5 mm (0.079–0.197 in) long. It flowers year round. It is a weedy species, found in lawns and along other disturbed areas such as roadsides and paths.

== Uses ==
Calyptocarpus vialis possesses medicinal properties that are as effective as the antibacterial drug ciprofloxacin. Additionally, C. vialis extracts are more effective against fungal stains than the standard market drug. With further research and development, C. vialis could be crucial in developing medications for various diseases.

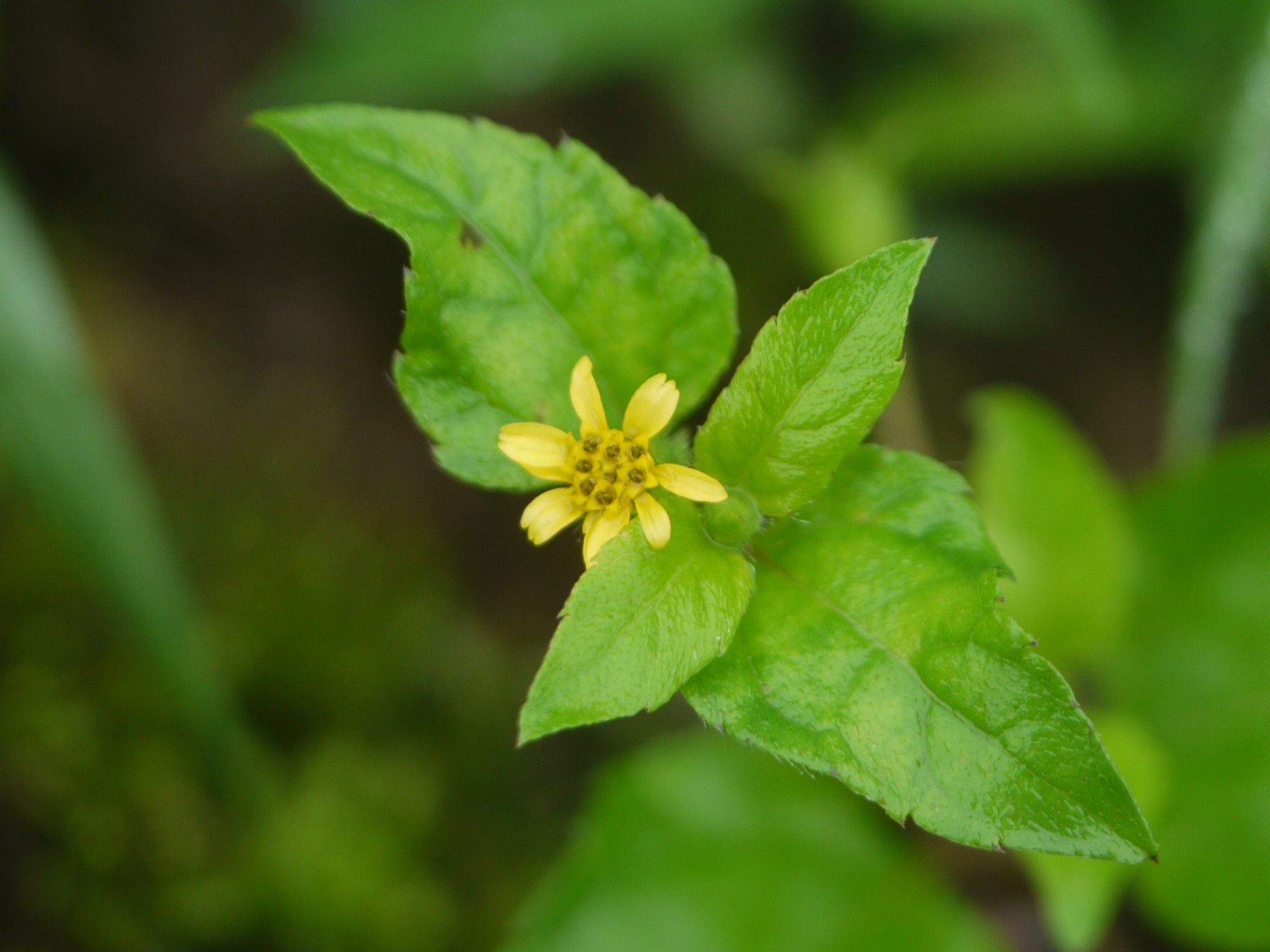
Flowerhead with seven ray flowers
