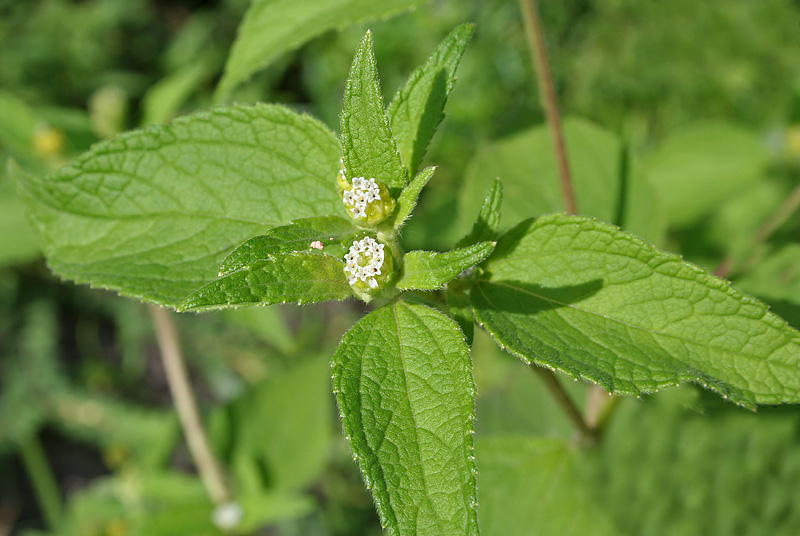
- Blainvillea acmella

Scientific classification
- Kingdom: Plantae
- Clade: Embryophytes
- Clade: Tracheophytes
- Clade: Angiosperms
- Clade: Eudicots
- Clade: Asterids
- Order: Asterales
- Family: Asteraceae
- Subfamily: Asteroideae
- Tribe: Heliantheae
- Subtribe: Ecliptinae
- Genus: Blainvillea; Cass.

Type species
- Blainvillea rhomboidea Cass.

Synonyms
- Eisenmannia Sch.Bip. ex Hochst.; Galophthalmum Nees & Mart.

= Blainvillea =

Genus of flowering plants

Blainvillea is a genus of flowering plants in the family Asteraceae. They are native to tropical and subtropical regions of Africa, Australia, and Latin America.

They are annual or perennial herbs. The flower heads contain small ray florets with toothed tips, usually yellow, or occasionally white. The genus name honors French naturalist Henri Marie Ducrotay de Blainville.

Species

The following species are recognised in the genus Blainvillea:

- Blainvillea acmella
- Blainvillea calcicola
- Blainvillea cunninghamii
- Blainvillea dichotoma - French Guiana
- Blainvillea gayana - Africa from Egypt to Gambia and KwaZulu-Natal; Yemen, Cape Verde
