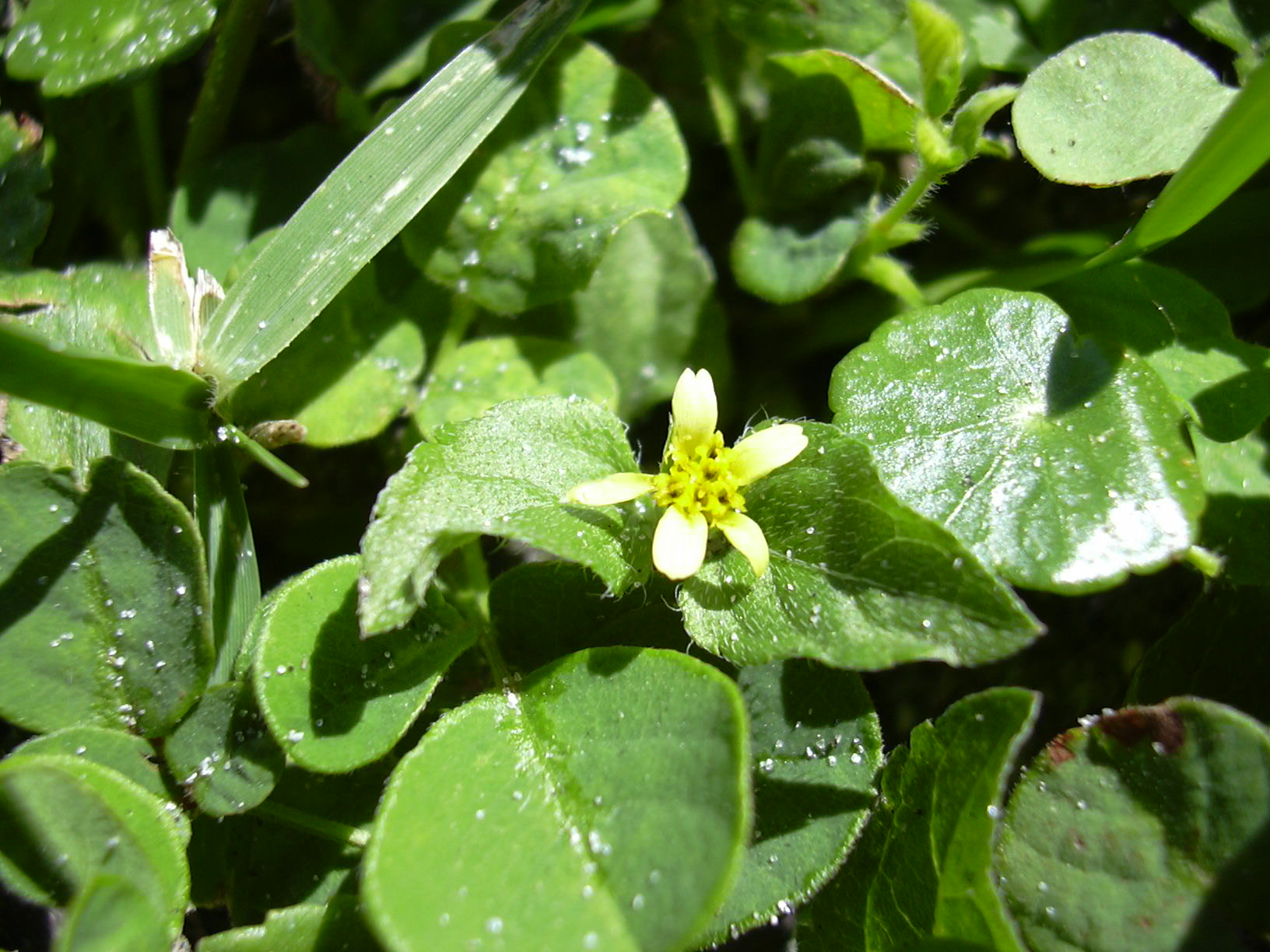
- Calyptocarpus vialis

Scientific classification
- Kingdom: Plantae
- Clade: Tracheophytes
- Clade: Angiosperms
- Clade: Eudicots
- Clade: Asterids
- Order: Asterales
- Family: Asteraceae
- Subfamily: Asteroideae
- Tribe: Heliantheae
- Subtribe: Ecliptinae
- Genus: Calyptocarpus; Less.

Type species
- Calyptocarpus vialis Less.

Synonyms
- Calyptrocarpus Rchb. 1841 not Less. 1832; Oligogyne DC.

= Calyptocarpus =

Genus of flowering plants

Calyptocarpus is a genus of flowering plants in the family Asteraceae.

The name is derived from the Greek kalypto (covered or hidden) and karpos (fruit). Species are distributed in the Southern United States and Latin America.

These are perennial herbs with decumbent to prostrate stems up to 30 cm (12 in) long. Their oppositely arranged leaves have blades of various shapes with toothed edges. Flower heads are solitary in the leaf axils. Each has three to eight light-yellow ray florets and several yellow disc florets. The fruit is a flat cypsela with a pappus of two or more awns.

Two to six species are accepted in the genus:

- C. biaristatus - Brazil, Paraguay, Uruguay, Argentina
- C. burchellii - southeastern Brazil
- C. vialis – straggler daisy, horseherb, hierba del caballo, lawnflower, creeping Cinderella-weed - Texas, Louisiana, Central America, Venezuela; naturalized in Taiwan, Australia, Hawaii, parts of United States
- C. wendlandii - Central America, southern Mexico
