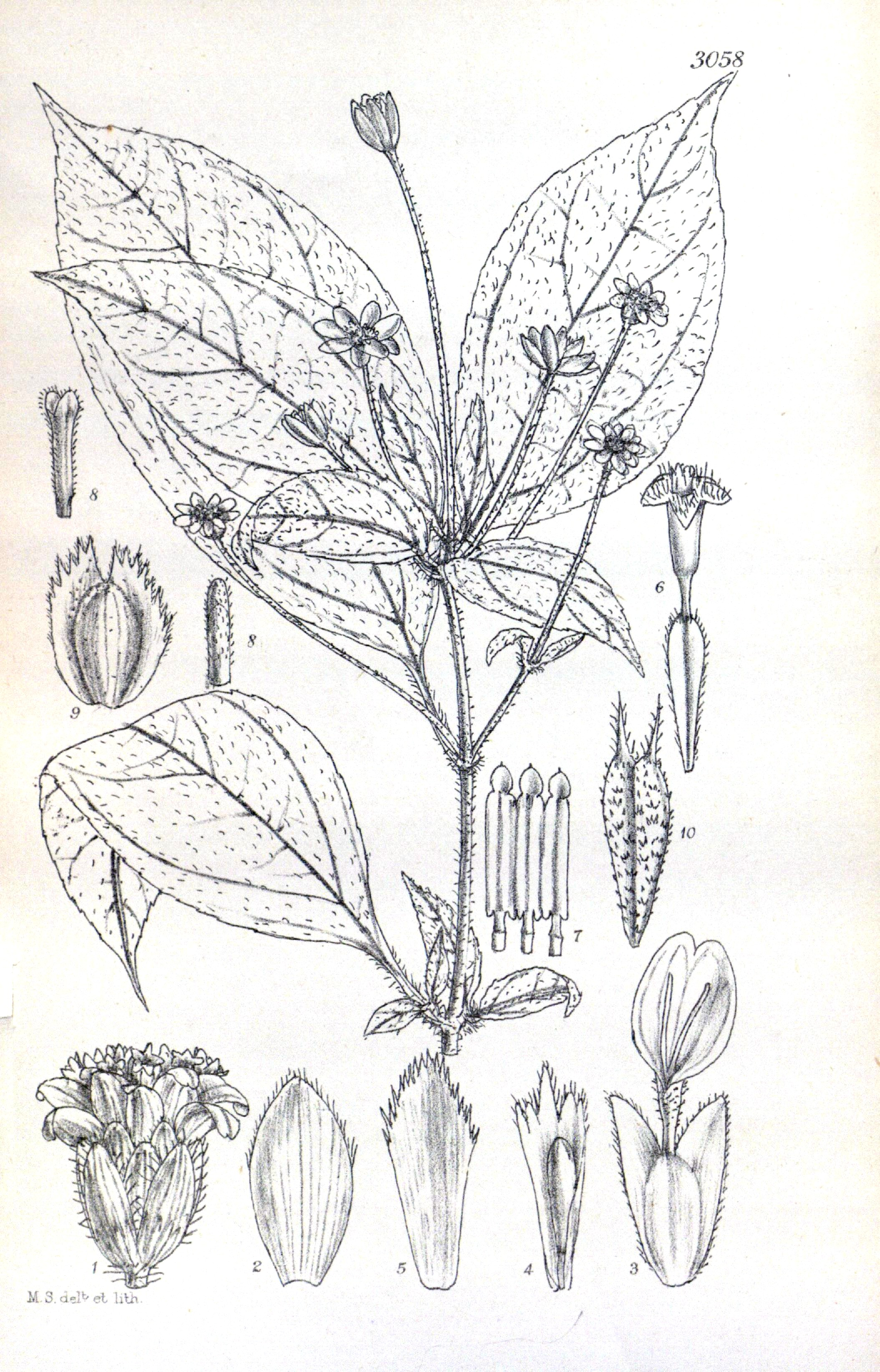
- Schizoptera peduncularis

Scientific classification
- Kingdom: Plantae
- Clade: Tracheophytes
- Clade: Angiosperms
- Clade: Eudicots
- Clade: Asterids
- Order: Asterales
- Family: Asteraceae
- Subfamily: Asteroideae
- Tribe: Heliantheae
- Subtribe: Ecliptinae
- Genus: Schizoptera; Turcz. 1851 not Benth. 1873
- Species: S. peduncularis

Binomial name
- Schizoptera peduncularis (Benth.) S.F.Blake

Synonyms
- Schizoptera Benth. 1873 not Turcz. 1851; Synedrella peduncularis Benth.; Schizoptera trichotoma Turcz.

= Schizoptera =

Genus of plants

Schizoptera is a plant genus in the family Asteraceae.

Species

There is only one accepted species, Schizoptera peduncularis, native to Peru and Ecuador.
