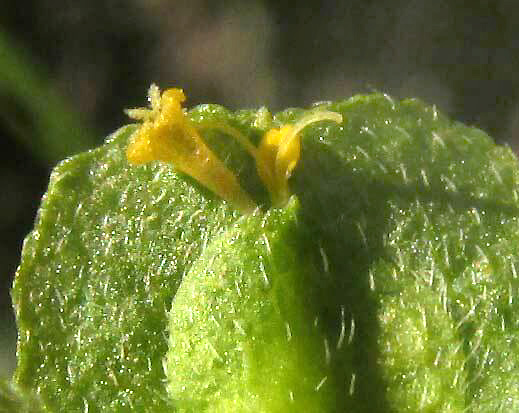
- Delilia biflora, male and female flowers

Scientific classification
- Kingdom: Plantae
- Clade: Tracheophytes
- Clade: Angiosperms
- Clade: Eudicots
- Clade: Asterids
- Order: Asterales
- Family: Asteraceae
- Tribe: Heliantheae
- Genus: Delilia
- Species: D. biflora

Binomial name
- Delilia biflora (L.) Kuntze, 1891

Synonyms
- Elvira biflora (L.) DC. 1836; Elvira martyni Cass. 1824; Milleria biflora L. 1753; Delilia berteroi Spreng. 1823; Meratia sprengelii Cass 1824

= Delilia biflora =

Species of plant

Delilia biflora, in Spanish often known as pelusilla (little fluffy) and amorosa (loving), is a neotropical herbaceous annual remarkable for its much-reduced flowering heads. It belongs to the family Asteraceae.

== Description ==
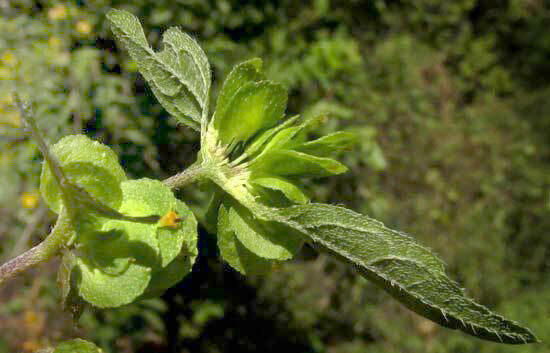
Delilia biflora, flowers and immature fruits

Delilia biflora displays this very unusual combination of floral features:

- Each head comprises one flat, petal-like ray floret without stamens, plus 1-4 fertile disc florets with cylindrical corollas and both stamens and female parts; both types produce fruits.
- The flat ray floret is about 0.4 mm long (~ 1/64 inch) while the cylindrical corolla of each disc floret is 1.3 mm long (~ 1/20 inch).
- Each fruit is united with its flowering head's 3 lowest, flatly compressed involucral bracts forming a thin, wafer-like unit about 5 mm across (~1/5 inch).
- Flowers are grouped in more or less spherical clusters both at stem tips and from the axils of leaves.

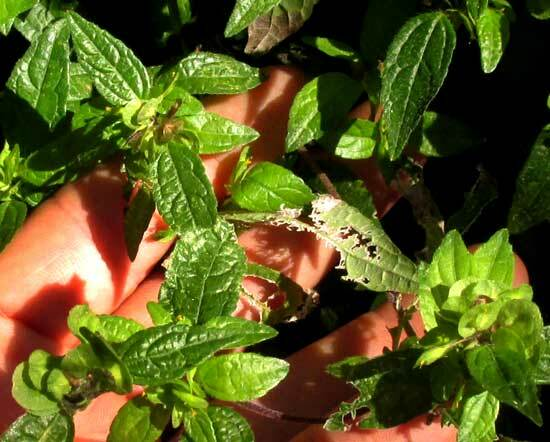
Delilia biflora, plant with hand for scale

Vegetative features are less unusual. They include:

- The much-branched plants are annual herbs which can be up to 90cm tall (nearly 3 feet).
- Plants are nearly hairless to covered with stiff, sharp, straight hairs, or trichomes up to 0.5mm long ( ~1/64 inch), and which lie against the plant's surface, pointing toward the stem tip.
- Leaves are simple, not deeply lobed.
- Leaves arise opposite one another on their stems.

== Distribution ==
Delilia biflora occurs from Mexico southward through Central America into South America as far as northern Argentina and Brazil. Also it's been introduced, in Cape Verde, Cuba and the Galápagos.

== Habitat ==
In Mexico, Central America, and in the Andes of South America, Delilia biflora inhabits the understory, but at higher elevations often it occurs in sunny open areas. In Brazil, usually it's a weed in cultivated fields. In central highland Mexico it is described as apparently preferring calcareous soils and basaltic slopes, in zones of tropical deciduous forests and subtropical scrub.

== Taxonomy ==
Within the huge Asteraceae Family, Delilia biflora is classified as belonging to the subfamily Asteroideae, the tribe Heliantheae, and the subtribe Ecliptinae. Only one other species, endemic to the Galapagos Islands, is assigned to the genus Delilia.

=== Etymology ===
The genus name Delilia honors Alire Raffeneau Delile, who during the French invasion of Egypt and Syria (1798–1801) accompanied Napoleon, and who later was an author of the French book series Description de l'Égypte.

The species name biflora is constructed of the Latin bi, meaning "two", and the Latin flos, for "flower". Thus "two-flowered", which the species can appear to have.
