= List of endangered plants of North America =

A list of endangered plants and lichens, including those on the United States' Endangered Species List.

== Conifers ==
Abies guatemalensis (Guatemalan fir)
Cupressus abramsiana (Santa Cruz cypress)
Fitzroya cupressoides (Patagonian cypress)
Sequoia sempervirens (coast redwood)
Sequoiadendron giganteum (giant redwood)
Torreya taxifolia (Florida torreya)

== Ferns and fern allies ==
Adenophorus periens (pendant kihi fern)
Ctenitis squamigera (Pauoa)
Cyathea dryopteroides (elfin tree fern)
Diplazium molokaiense (Molokai twinsorus fern)
Doryopteris angelica (Kauai digit fern)
Dryopteris crinalis (serpent woodfern)
Elaphoglossum serpens (no common name)
Isoetes louisianensis (Louisiana quillwort)
Isoetes melanospora (black spored quillwort)
Isoetes tegetiformans (mat-forming quillwort)
Marsilea villosa (Ihi`ihi)

== Lichens ==
Cladonia perforata (Florida perforate cladonia)
Gymnoderma lineare (rock gnome lichen)

== Flowering plants ==
Abronia macrocarpa (large-fruited sand verbena)
Abutilon eremitopetalum (hidden-petal Indian mallow)
Abutilon menziesii (koʻoloaʻula)
Abutilon sandwicense (greenflower Indian mallow)
Acaena exigua (liliwai)
Acanthomintha ilicifolia (San Diego thornmint)
Achyranthes mutica (blunt chaff flower)
Aconitum noveboracense (northern blue monkshood)
Aeschynomene virginica (Virginia jointvetch)
Agalinis acuta (sandplain gerardia)
Alectryon macrococcus (māhoe)
Allium munzii (Munz' onion)
Alsinidendron lychnoides (kuawawaenohu)
Alsinidendron obovatum (Waianae Range alsinidendron)
Alsinidendron trinerve (three-nerved alsinidendron)
Alsinidendron viscosum (climbing alsinidendron)
Amaranthus brownii (Brown's pigweed)
Amaranthus pumilus (seabeach amaranth)
Ambrosia cheiranthifolia (South Texas ambrosia)
Ambrosia pumila (San Diego ambrosia)
Amsinckia grandiflora (large-flowered fiddleneck)
Amsonia kearneyana (Kearney's bluestar)
Apios priceana (Price's potato-bean)
Arabis mcdonaldiana (McDonald's rockcress)
Arabis perstellata (Braun's rockcress)
Arabis serotina (shale barren rockcress)
Arctostaphylos confertiflora (Santa Rosa Island manzanita)
Arctostaphylos morroensis (Morro manzanita)
Arctostaphylos myrtifolia (Ione manzanita)
Arctostaphylos pallida (pallid manzanita)
Arenaria paludicola (marsh sandwort)
Arenaria ursina (Bear Valley sandwort)
Argyroxiphium kauense (Mauna Loa silversword)
Aristida chaseae (Chase's threeawn)
Aristida portoricensis (pelos del diablo)
Asclepias meadii (Mead's milkweed)
Asclepias welshii (Welsh's milkweed)
Asimina pulchella (beautiful pawpaw)
Asimina rugelii (Rugel's pawpaw)
Asimina tetramera (four-petal pawpaw)
Astelia waialealae (pa`iniu)
Astragalus albens (Cushenbury milkvetch)
Astragalus ampullarioides (Shivwits milkvetch)
Astragalus applegatei (Applegate's milkvetch)
Astragalus bibullatus (Pyne's ground plum)
Astragalus brauntonii (Braunton's milkvetch)
Astragalus claranus (Clara Hunt's milkvetch
Astragalus desereticus (Deseret milkvetch)
Astragalus holmgreniorum (Holmgren's milkvetch)
Astragalus humillimus (Mancos milkvetch)
Astragalus jaegerianus (Lane Mountain milkvetch)
Astragalus osterhoutii (Osterhout milkvetch)
Astragalus phoenix (Ash Meadows milkvetch)
Astragalus tricarinatus (triple-rib milkvetch)
Astrophytum asterias (sand dollar cactus)
Auerodendron pauciflorum (turtlefat)
Ayenia limitaris (Texas ayenia)
Baccharis vanessae (Encinitas baccharis)
Banara vanderbiltii (palo de ramon)
Baptisia arachnifera (hairy rattleweed)
Betula uber (Virginia roundleaf birch)
Bidens wiebkei (Molokaʻi koʻokoʻolau)
Blennosperma bakeri (Sonoma sunshine)
Boechera hoffmannii (Hoffmann's rockcress)
Boltonia decurrens (decurrent false aster)
Bonamia grandiflora (Florida lady's nightcap)
Bonamia menziesii (Hawaii lady's nightcap)
Brighamia insignis (cabbage on a stick)
Brighamia rockii (pua 'ala)
Brodiaea filifolia (threadleaf brodiaea)
Brodiaea pallida (Chinese Camp brodiaea)
Buxus vahlii (Vahl's boxwood)
Caesalpinia kavaiensis (uhiuhi)
Callicarpa ampla (capa rose)
Callirhoe scabriuscula (Texas poppy mallow)
Calochortus tiburonensis (Tiburon Mariposa lily)
Calyptranthes thomasiana (Thomas' lidflower)
Cistanthe pulchella (Mariposa pussypaws)
Calyptronoma rivalis (palma de manaca)
Calystegia stebbinsii (Stebbins' false bindweed)
Camissonia benitensis (San Benito evening primrose)
Campanula robinsiae (Brooksville bellflower)
Canavalia molokaiensis (puakauhi)
Canavalia napaliensis (Mākaha Valley Jack-bean)
Cardamine micranthera (small-anthered bittercress)
Carex albida (white sedge)
Carex lutea (golden sedge)
Carex specuicola (Navajo sedge)
Castilleja cinerea (ashgray Indian paintbrush)
Castilleja grisea (San Clemente Island Indian paintbrush)
Castilleja levisecta (golden paintbrush)
Castilleja mollis (softleaf Indian paintbrush)
Catesbaea melanocarpa (tropical lilythorn)
Caulanthus californicus (California jewelflower)
Ceanothus ferrisiae (coyote ceanothus)
Ceanothus ophiochilus (Vail Lake ceanothus)
Ceanothus roderickii (Pine Hill ceanothus)
Cenchrus agrimonioides (kāmanomano)
Cercocarpus traskiae (Santa Catalina Island mountain-mahogany)
Charpentiera densiflora (dense-flowered pāpala)
Chlorogalum purpureum (purple amole)
Chorizanthe howellii (Mendocino spineflower)
Chorizanthe orcuttiana (San Diego spineflower)
Chorizanthe robusta (robust spineflower)
Chorizanthe valida (Sonoma spineflower)
Chrysopsis floridana (Florida golden aster)
Cirsium loncholepis (La Graciosa thistle)
Cirsium pitcheri (Pitcher's thistle)
Cirsium vinaceum (Sacramento Mountains thistle)
Clarkia franciscana (Presidio clarkia)
Clarkia imbricata (Vine Hill clarkia)
Clarkia springvillensis (Springville clarkia)
Clematis morefieldii (Morefield's leather flower)
Clematis socialis (Alabama leather flower)
Clermontia drepanomorpha (Kohala Mountain clermontia)
Clermontia lindseyana (hillside clermontia)
Clermontia peleana (Pele clermontia)
Clermontia pyrularia (pear clermontia)
Clermontia samuelii (Hana clermontia)
Clitoria fragrans (pigeon wings)
Colubrina oppositifolia (Kauila)
Conradina brevifolia (short-leaved rosemary)
Conradina etonia (Etonia rosemary)
Conradina glabra (Apalachicola rosemary)
Conradina verticillata (Cumberland rosemary)
Cordia bellonis (serpentine manjack)
Cordylanthus maritimus (salt marsh bird's beak)
Cordylanthus palmatus (palmatus bird's beak)
Cornutia obovata (palo de nigua)
Coryphantha ramillosa (bunched cory cactus)
Cranichis ricartii (Puerto Rico helmet orchid)
Crotalaria avonensis (Avon Park rattlebox)
Cryptantha crassipes (Terlingua Creek cat's-eye)
Cyanea acuminata (Honolulu cyanea)
Cyanea asarifolia (gingerleaf cyanea)
Cyanea copelandii (treetrunk cyanea)
Cyanea crispa (Koolau Range rollandia)
Cyanea dolichopoda (haha)
Cyanea dunbariae (ravine cyanea)
Cyanea eleeleensis (Eleele cyanea)
Cyanea glabra (smooth cyanea)
Cyanea grimesiana (splitleaf cyanea)
Cyanea hamatiflora (wetforest cyanea)
Cyanea humboldtiana (Oahu rollandia)
Cyanea kolekoleensis ('oha)
Cyanea koolauensis (Palolo Valley rollandia)
Cyanea kuhihewa (Limahuli Valley cyanea)
Cyanea lobata (Waihee Valley cyanea)
Cyanea longiflora (ridge rollandia)
Cyanea mannii (Mann's cyanea)
Cyanea mceldowneyi (McEldowney cyanea)
Cyanea pinnatifida (sharktail cyanea)
Cyanea platyphylla (puna cyanea)
Cyanea procera (Molokai cyanea)
Cyanea recta (upright cyanea)
Cyanea remyi (Remy's cyanea)
Cyanea rivularis (plateau cyanea)
Cyanea shipmanii (Shipman's cyanea)
Cyanea st.-johnii (St. John's rollandia)
Cyanea stictophylla (Kaiholena cyanea)
Cyanea superba (Mt. Kaala cyanea)
Cyanea truncata (Punaluu cyanea)
Cyperus trachysanthos (pu`uka`a)
Cyrtandra crenata (Kahana Valley cyrtandra)
Cyrtandra cyaneoides (mapele)
Cyrtandra dentata (mountain cyrtandra)
Cyrtandra giffardii (Giffard's cyrtandra)
Cyrtandra munroi (Lanaihale cyrtandra)
Cyrtandra oenobarba (shaggystem cyrtandra)
Cyrtandra paliku (cliffside cyrtandra)
Cyrtandra polyantha (Niu Valley cyrtandra)
Cyrtandra subumbellata (parasol cyrtandra)
Cyrtandra tintinnabula (Laupahoehoe cyrtandra)
Cyrtandra viridiflora (ha`iwale)
Dalea foliosa (leafy prairie clover)
Daphnopsis hellerana (no common name)
Deinandra conjugens (Otay tarweed)
Delissea rhytidosperma (Kauai delissea)
Delissea subcordata (Ko'olau Range delissea)
Delphinium bakeri (Baker's larkspur)
Delphinium luteum (yellow larkspur)
Dicerandra christmanii (Garrett's mint)
Dicerandra cornutissima (longspurred mint)
Dicerandra frutescens (scrub balm)
Dicerandra immaculata (Lakela's mint)
Diplacus vandenbergensis (Vandenberg monkeyflower)
Dubautia herbstobatae (na'ena'e)
Dubautia kalalauensis (na'ena'e)
Dubautia kenwoodii (na'ena'e)
Dubautia latifolia (koholapehu)
Dubautia pauciflorula (Wahiawa bog dubautia)
Dubautia plantaginea (plantainleaf dubautia)
Dubautia waialealae (Wai'ale'ale dubautia)
Dudleya nesiotica (Santa Cruz Island liveforever)
Dudleya stolonifera (Laguna Beach liveforever)
Dudleya traskiae (Santa Barbara Island liveforever)
Dudleya verityi (Verity's liveforever)
Echinacea laevigata (smooth purple coneflower)
Echinacea tennesseensis (Tennessee coneflower)
Echinocactus horizonthalonius (horse maimer)
Eragrostis fosbergii (Fosberg's love grass)
Erigeron parishii (Parish's fleabane)
Erigeron rhizomatus (Zuni fleabane)
Eriodictyon altissimum (Indian Knob mountainbalm)
Eriodictyon capitatum (Lompoc yerba santa)
Eriogonum apricum (Ione buckwheat)
Eriogonum gypsophilum (Seven River Hills buckwheat)
Eriogonum pelinophilum (clay-loving wild buckwheat)
Eryngium cuneifolium (wedgeleaf snakeroot)
Erysimum menziesii (Menzies' wallflower)
Erysimum teretifolium (Ben Lomond wallflower)
Erythronium propullans (Minnesota dwarf trout lily)
Escobaria minima (Nellie cory cactus)
Escobaria robbinsorum (Cochise pincushion cactus)
Escobaria sneedii (carpet foxtail cactus)
Eugenia haematocarpa (uvillo)
Eugenia koolauensis (nioi)
Eugenia woodburyana (Woodbury's stopper)
Euphorbia deppeana (Oahu sandmat)
Euphorbia eleanoriae (Nā Pali sandmat)
Euphorbia garberi (Garber's spurge)
Euphorbia haeleeleana (Kauai spurge)
Euphorbia halemanui (Kauai sandmat)
Euphorbia herbstii (Herbst's sandmat)
Euphorbia hooveri (Hoover's sandmat)
Euphorbia kuwaleana (kokomalei)
Euphorbia rockii (Koolau Range sandmat)
Euphorbia telephioides (Telephus spurge)
Eutrema penlandii (Penland's alpine fen mustard)
Exocarpos luteolus (heau)
Flueggea neowawraea (mēhamehame)
Frankenia johnstonii (Johnston's seaheath)
Fremontodendron mexicanum (Mexican flannelbush)
Fritillaria gentneri (Gentner's fritillary)
Galactia smallii (Small's milkpea)
Galium buxifolium (box bedstraw)
Gardenia brighamii (nānū)
Gardenia mannii (nānū)
Geocarpon minimum (tinytim)
Geranium arboreum (Hawaiian red-flowered geranium)
Geranium kauaiense (Kauai geranium)
Geranium multiflorum (manyflowered cranesbill)
Gesneria pauciflora (yerba maricao de cueva)
Geum radiatum (spreading avens)
Goetzea elegans (matabuey)
Gouania hillebrandii (hairyfruit chewstick)
Gouania meyenii (smoothfruit chewstick)
Gouania vitifolia (Oahu chewstick)
Gratiola amphiantha (pool sprite)
Grindelia fraxino-pratensis (Ash Meadows gumplant)
Hackelia venusta (showy stickseed)
Haplostachys haplostachya (honohono)
Harperocallis flava (Harper's beauty)
Harrisia fragrans (fragrant prickly apple)
Harrisia portoricensis (higo chumbo)
Hedeoma todsenii (Todsen's pennyroyal)
Juglans cinerea (butternut tree)
Kadua cookiana (Cook's bluet)
Kadua cordata (kopa)
Kadua coriacea ('kio'ele)
Kadua degeneri (Waianae Range starviolet)
Kadua laxiflora (pilo)
Kadua parvula (rockface starviolet)
Kadua st.-johnii (Nā Pali beach starviolet)
Helenium virginicum (Virginia sneezeweed)
Mahonia nevinii (Nevin's barberry)
Minuartia cumberlandensis (Cumberland sandwort)
Pedicularis furbishiae (Furbish's lousewort) Schenkia sebaeoides (lavaslope centaury)
Sclerocactus mariposensis (syn. Echinomastus mariposensis, golfball cactus)
Zeltnera namophila (spring-loving centaury)
Zizania texana (Texas wild rice)

== See also ==
- List of endangered species in North America
