= Forest gardenia =

Forest gardenia is a common name for several plants and may refer to:

- Gardenia brighamii, endemic to Hawaii
- Gardenia thunbergia, native to southern Africa
