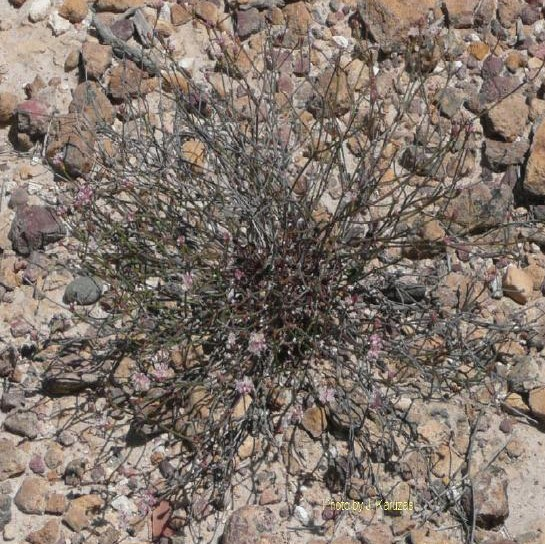

Conservation status
- Endangered (ESA)

- Imperiled (NatureServe)

Scientific classification
- Kingdom: Plantae
- Clade: Tracheophytes
- Clade: Angiosperms
- Clade: Eudicots
- Order: Caryophyllales
- Family: Polygonaceae
- Genus: Eriogonum
- Species: E. apricum

Binomial name
- Eriogonum apricum J.T.Howell

= Eriogonum apricum =

Species of wild buckwheat

Eriogonum apricum is a rare species of wild buckwheat known by the common name Ione buckwheat. It is endemic to Amador County, California, in the United States.

== Description ==
This is a small perennial herb growing in patches no more than 25 centimeters wide and tall. Its straggly erect stems are mostly naked and reddish or brown in color, and they have a few tiny, round, fuzzy leaves toward the base. Atop each thin branch of the stem is an inflorescence with minute flowers each only a few millimeters wide. There are two varieties of this plant; var. prostratum is sometimes called Irish Hill buckwheat.

== Taxonomy ==
Eriogonum apricum was first described by John Thomas Howell in 1955. It is classified in the Eriogonum genus within the Polygonaceae family. The species has two accepted varieties.

- Eriogonum apricum var. apricum – The autonymic variety, endemic to western Amador County
- Eriogonum apricum var. prostratum – Also endemic to western Amador County described in 1970 by Rodney Gale Myatt

== Distribution ==
This rare plant is endemic to the Sierra Nevada foothills of California, where it is known from fewer than ten occurrences in Amador County. It is named after Apricum Hill, one of its few known locations between Ione and Buena Vista. It is a state and federally listed endangered species.

== Ecology ==
This plant grows on and is named for the Ione Formation, a local geologic formation of the iron-rich oxisol soil type. It is a member of a plant community known as the Ione Manzanita Series, where it is commonly associated with the Ione manzanita (Arctostaphylos myrtifolia), another rare plant.

== Conservation ==
Threats to the survival of this endangered species include agriculture, development, and erosion. Habitat destruction from the mining of common sand, silica sand, clay, and lignite is a major threat.
