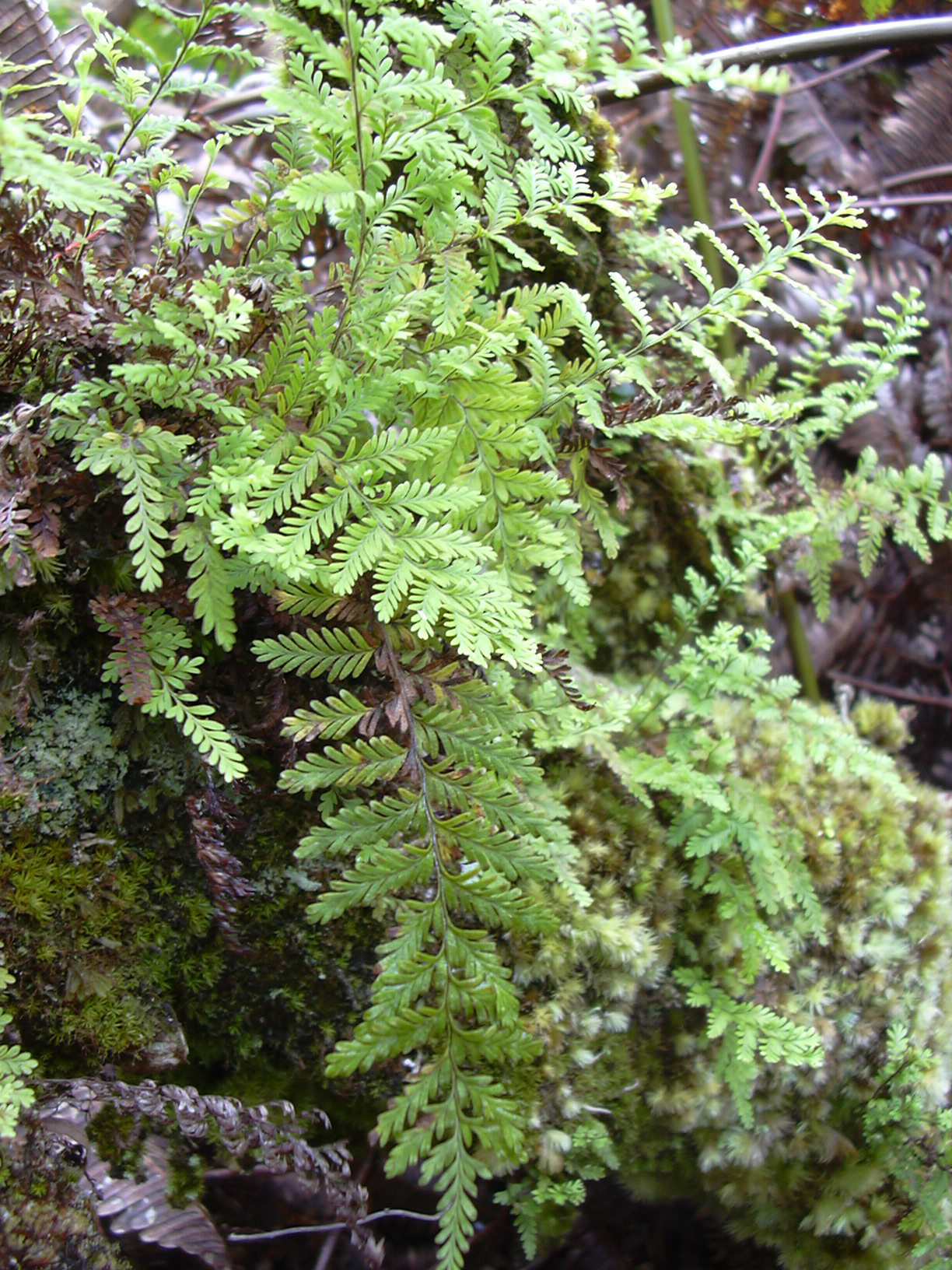
- Adenophorus tamariscinus

Scientific classification
- Kingdom: Plantae
- Clade: Tracheophytes
- Division: Polypodiophyta
- Class: Polypodiopsida
- Order: Polypodiales
- Suborder: Polypodiineae
- Family: Polypodiaceae
- Subfamily: Grammitidoideae
- Genus: Adenophorus; Gaudich.

Species
- See text.

= Adenophorus =

Genus of plants

Adenophorus is a genus of ferns in the family Polypodiaceae, subfamily Grammitidoideae, according to the Pteridophyte Phylogeny Group classification of 2016 (PPG I). The genus is endemic to Hawaii.

== Species ==
As of April 2025, the Checklist of Ferns and Lycophytes of the World accepted the following eleven species and two hybrids:

- Adenophorus × abbottiae W.H.Wagner
- Adenophorus abietinus (D.C.Eaton) K.A.Wilson
- Adenophorus × carsonii Ranker
- Adenophorus epigaeus (L.E.Bishop) W.H.Wagner
- Adenophorus haalilioanus (Brack.) K.A.Wilson
- Adenophorus hymenophylloides (Kaulf.) Hook. & Grev.
- Adenophorus montanus (Hillebr.) W.H.Wagner
- Adenophorus oahuensis (Copel.) L.E.Bishop
- Adenophorus periens L.E.Bishop
- Adenophorus pinnatifidus Gaudich.
- Adenophorus tamariscinus (Kaulf.) Hook. & Grev.
- Adenophorus tenellus (Kaulf.) Ranker
- Adenophorus tripinnatifidus Gaudich.
