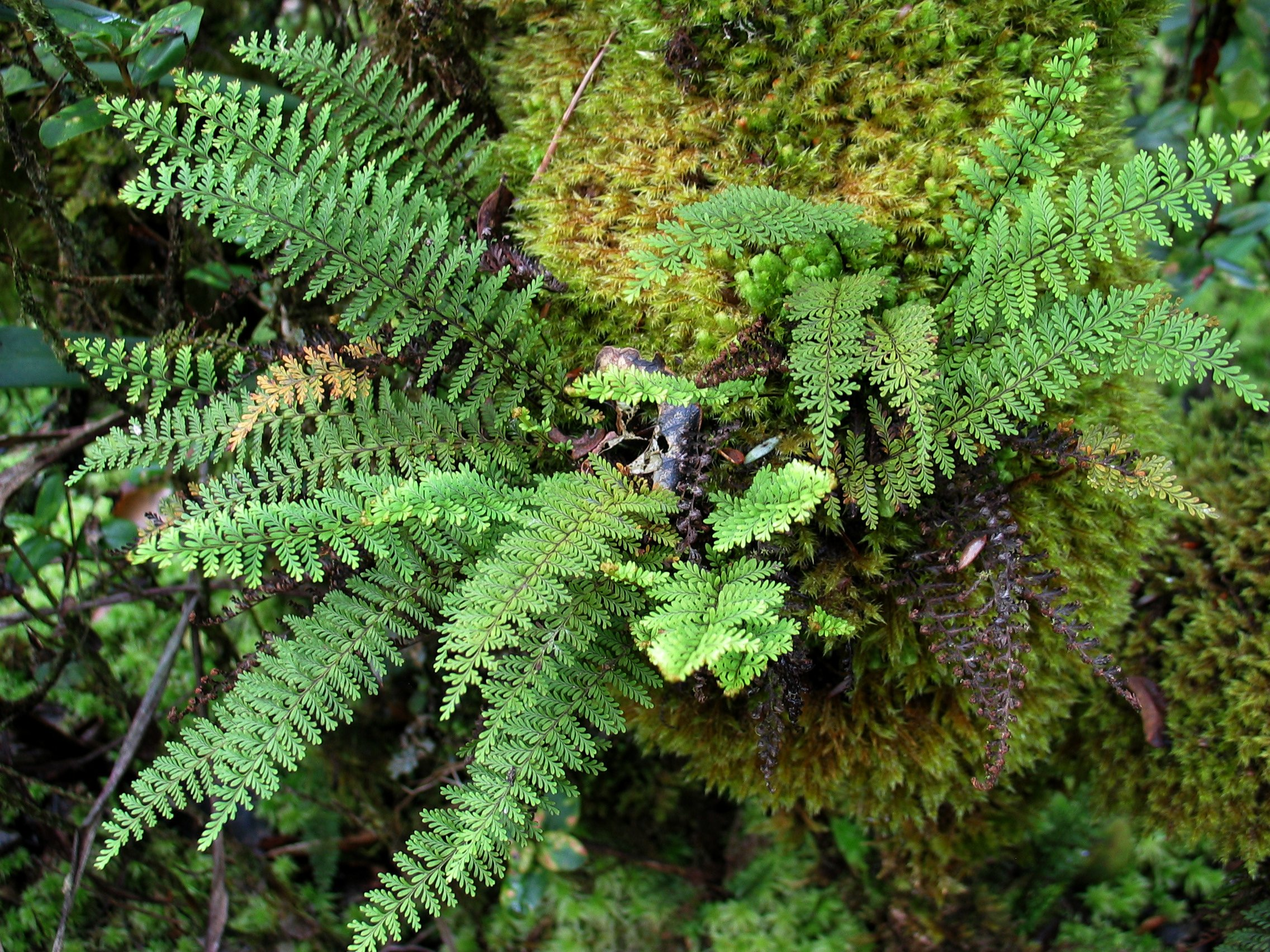

Scientific classification
- Kingdom: Plantae
- Clade: Tracheophytes
- Division: Polypodiophyta
- Class: Polypodiopsida
- Order: Polypodiales
- Suborder: Polypodiineae
- Family: Polypodiaceae
- Genus: Adenophorus
- Species: A. tamariscinus

Binomial name
- Adenophorus tamariscinus Hook. & Grev.

= Adenophorus tamariscinus =

Species of fern

Adenophorus tamariscinus, the wahine noho mauna, is a species of fern endemic to the US state of Hawaii. Fronds grow up to 8 in (20 cm) long. In its native habitat it is an epiphyte, growing in wet-mesic forests or rain forests.
