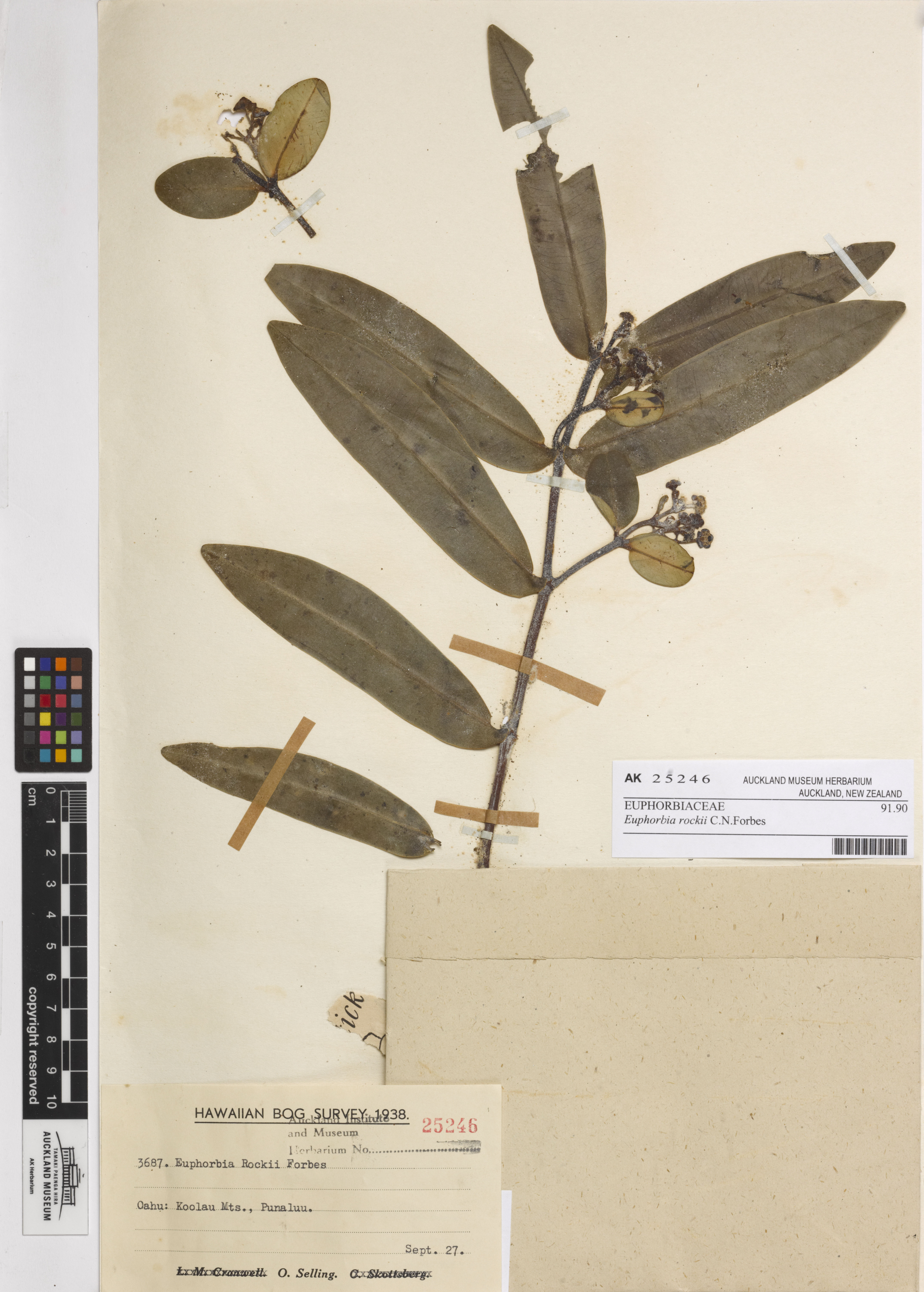

Conservation status
- Critically Imperiled (NatureServe)

Scientific classification
- Kingdom: Plantae
- Clade: Tracheophytes
- Clade: Angiosperms
- Clade: Eudicots
- Clade: Rosids
- Order: Malpighiales
- Family: Euphorbiaceae
- Genus: Euphorbia
- Species: E. rockii

Binomial name
- Euphorbia rockii C.N.Forbes

Synonyms
- Chamaesyce rockii

= Euphorbia rockii =

Species of flowering plant

Euphorbia rockii (syn. Chamaesyce rockii) is a rare species of flowering plant in the euphorb family known by the common names Koolau Range sandmat and Rock's broomspurge. It is endemic to Oʻahu, Hawaii, where it is known only from the Koʻolau Mountains. There are 200 to 300 plants remaining. Like other Hawaiian euphorbs, this plant is known locally as ʻakoko.

The remaining plants exist in fewer than 10 subpopulations on the peaks of the Koʻolau Mountains, where they often grow in wet forests and shrublands. The plant is threatened by the destruction and degradation of its habitat. The main agents of damage to the habitat are feral pigs and non-native plant species such as strawberry guava (Psidium littorale) and Koster's curse (Clidemia hirta).

This is a federally listed endangered species of the United States.
