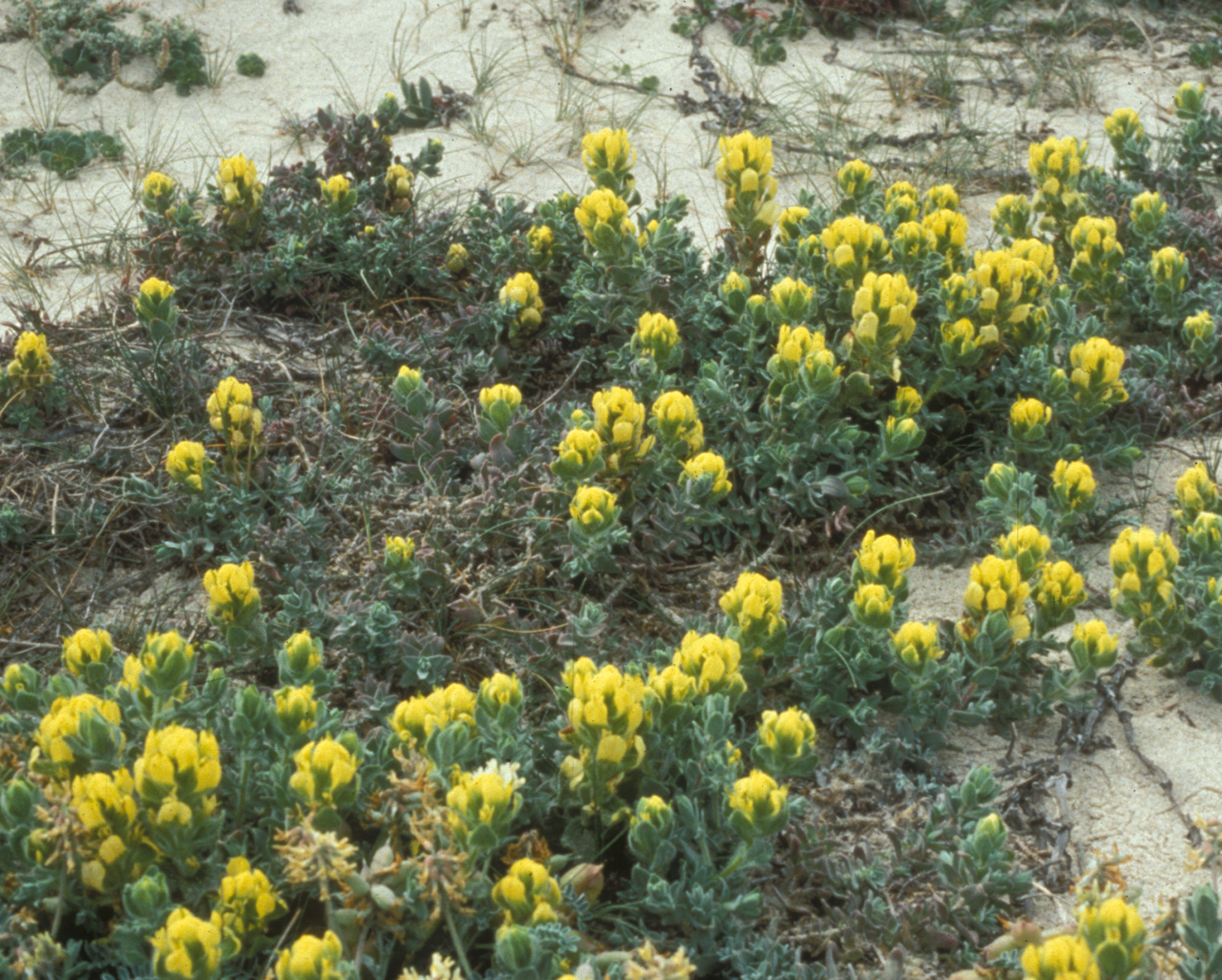

Conservation status
- Endangered (ESA)

Scientific classification
- Kingdom: Plantae
- Clade: Tracheophytes
- Clade: Angiosperms
- Clade: Eudicots
- Clade: Asterids
- Order: Lamiales
- Family: Orobanchaceae
- Genus: Castilleja
- Species: C. mollis

Binomial name
- Castilleja mollis Pennell

= Castilleja mollis =

Species of flowering plant

Castilleja mollis is a species of Indian paintbrush known by the common name softleaf Indian paintbrush. It is endemic to the Channel Islands of California, where it is currently known only from Santa Rosa Island. An occurrence was once noted on San Miguel Island, but the plant has not been found there since 1938. Its habitat is the coastal sage scrub around the windy sand dunes and bluffs.

== Description ==
This wildflower is a perennial herb with many spreading, prostrate branches up to about 40 centimeters long. The plant is coated in woolly, tangled, sometimes glandular hairs that give it a gray-green tint. The leaves are 1 to 3 centimeters long and oval. The inflorescence is up to 8 centimeters long and made up of fleshy green or yellow-green bracts. Between the bracts bloom the pale to bright yellow pouched flowers.

Like other Castilleja, this Castilleja mollis is hemiparasitic, attaching its roots to those of other plants to tap nutrients and water. The host plant for this Castilleja species is probably Menzies' goldenbush, Isocoma menziesii. Castilleja mollis is a federally listed endangered species.

== Conservation ==
There are two known occurrences of the plant remaining on Santa Rosa Island. It has become rare due to habitat destruction, mainly from the presence of domesticated and feral ungulates such as cattle, elk (Cervus canadensis roosevelti), and deer (Odocoileus hemionus). These animals trample the soil, which compacts and degrades it. Deer also tend to use patches of the plant as bedding. Introduced plant species have also taken over the area. The cattle and most of the other non-native animals have been removed, but many weeds remain, such as ice plant. The plant depends on Menzies' goldenbush, which has also declined in the area, its habitat becoming fragmented. Invasive grasses prevent the small Castilleja plants from establishing haustoria, its connections to the roots of the goldenbush.

This Castilleja may hybridize with Castilleja affinis.

A 2008 review of the species' status indicated that the plant has rebounded somewhat since the removal of the ungulates, but it is still vulnerable enough that it will not yet be downlisted from endangered status.
