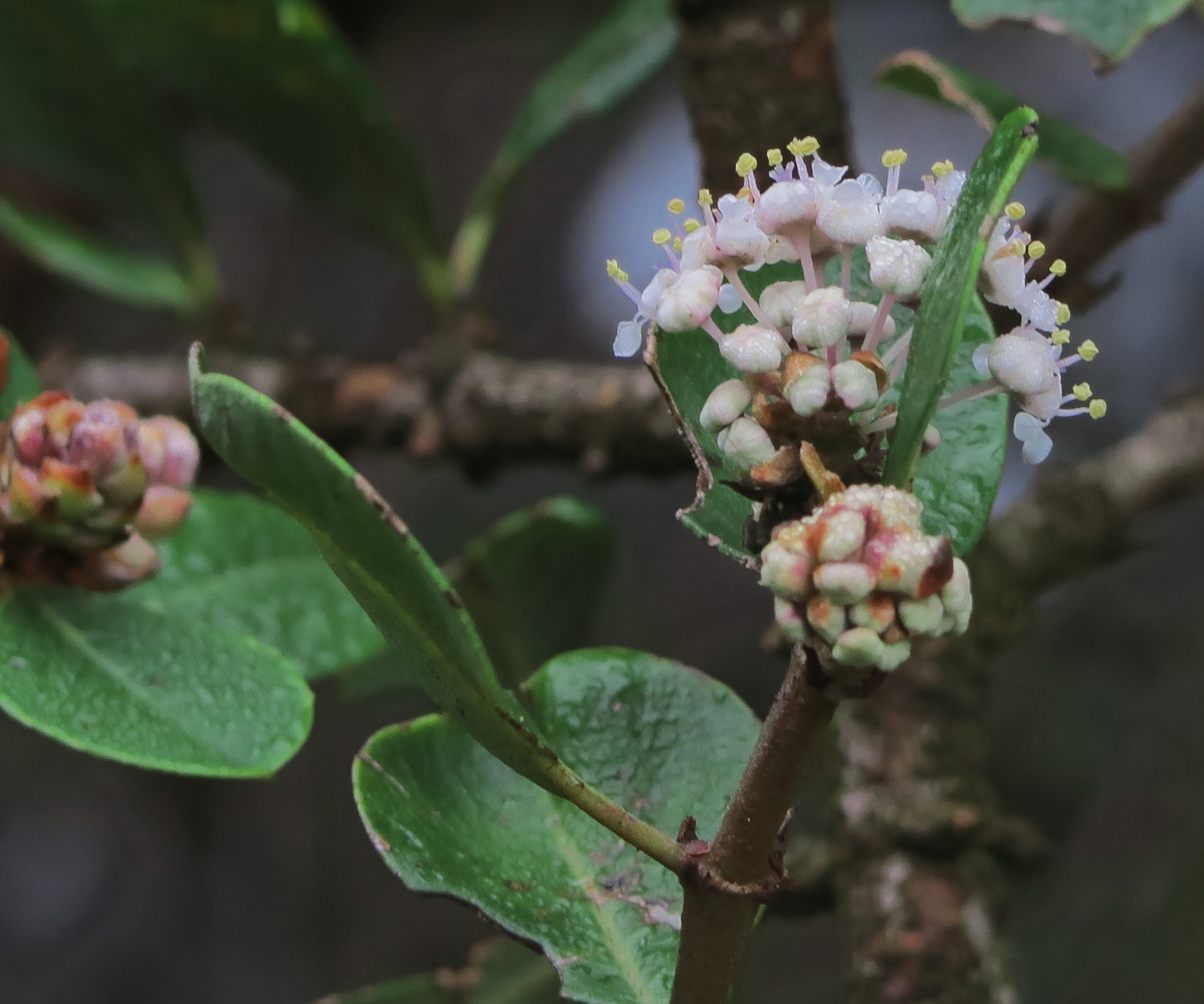

Conservation status
- Endangered (ESA)

Scientific classification
- Kingdom: Plantae
- Clade: Tracheophytes
- Clade: Angiosperms
- Clade: Eudicots
- Clade: Rosids
- Order: Rosales
- Family: Rhamnaceae
- Genus: Ceanothus
- Species: C. ferrisiae

Binomial name
- Ceanothus ferrisiae McMinn

= Ceanothus ferrisiae =

Species of flowering plant

Ceanothus ferrisiae (sometimes spelled ferrisae) is a rare species of shrub in the family Rhamnaceae. Its common name is coyote ceanothus.

== Description ==
Ceanothus ferrisiae grows erect to a maximum height approaching two meters (6 ft 7 in). The woody parts are reddish in color when new and age gray. The evergreen leaves are oppositely arranged and measure up to 3 centimeters (1.2 in) long. They are firm, flat, and generally toothed along the edges. The upper surface is hairless and deep green and the underside is paler in color and fuzzy in texture. The inflorescence is a small cluster of white flowers which bloom in the winter. The fruit is a rough, horned capsule just under a centimeter (0.39 in) wide.

== Distribution ==
Ceanothus ferrisiae is endemic to Santa Clara County, California, where it is known from only four or five occurrences near Mt. Hamilton in the Diablo Range. The largest population, located near Anderson Dam, is recovering from a 1992 wildfire that killed 95% of the plants. It is a member of the serpentine soils endemic flora and it occurs in chaparral. It is a federally listed endangered species.

== Conservation ==
There are about 6000 individuals remaining in five occurrences. The plant is threatened by loss and degradation of its habitat, which is being cleared for construction and used for dumping. The species also seems to have low recruitment.
