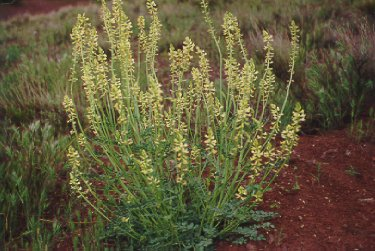

Conservation status
- Critically Imperiled (NatureServe)

Scientific classification
- Kingdom: Plantae
- Clade: Embryophytes
- Clade: Tracheophytes
- Clade: Angiosperms
- Clade: Eudicots
- Clade: Rosids
- Order: Fabales
- Family: Fabaceae
- Subfamily: Faboideae
- Genus: Astragalus
- Species: A. ampullarioides

Binomial name
- Astragalus ampullarioides (S.L.Welsh) S.L.Welsh, 1998

= Astragalus ampullarioides =

Shivwits milkvetch

Species of legume

Astragalus ampullarioides is a rare species of milkvetch known by the common name Shivwits milkvetch. It was previously classified as a variety of Astragalus eremiticus. It is endemic to Washington County, Utah, where it is known from only seven populations. Estimates of the total number of individuals range from 1000 to 4200. The species occurs in desert scrub and woodlands on the Chinle Formation. It is a federally listed endangered species.

This is a perennial herb growing erect to a maximum height near half a meter. It produces about 45 flowers on an erect inflorescence. It is pollinated by bees.

Much of the plant's range is within the bounds of Zion National Park and Shivwits tribal lands. Other parts of the range are unprotected. Threats to the species include habitat loss to development and agriculture, herbivory by rabbits, cattle grazing, off-road vehicles, quarrying, and introduced plant species.
