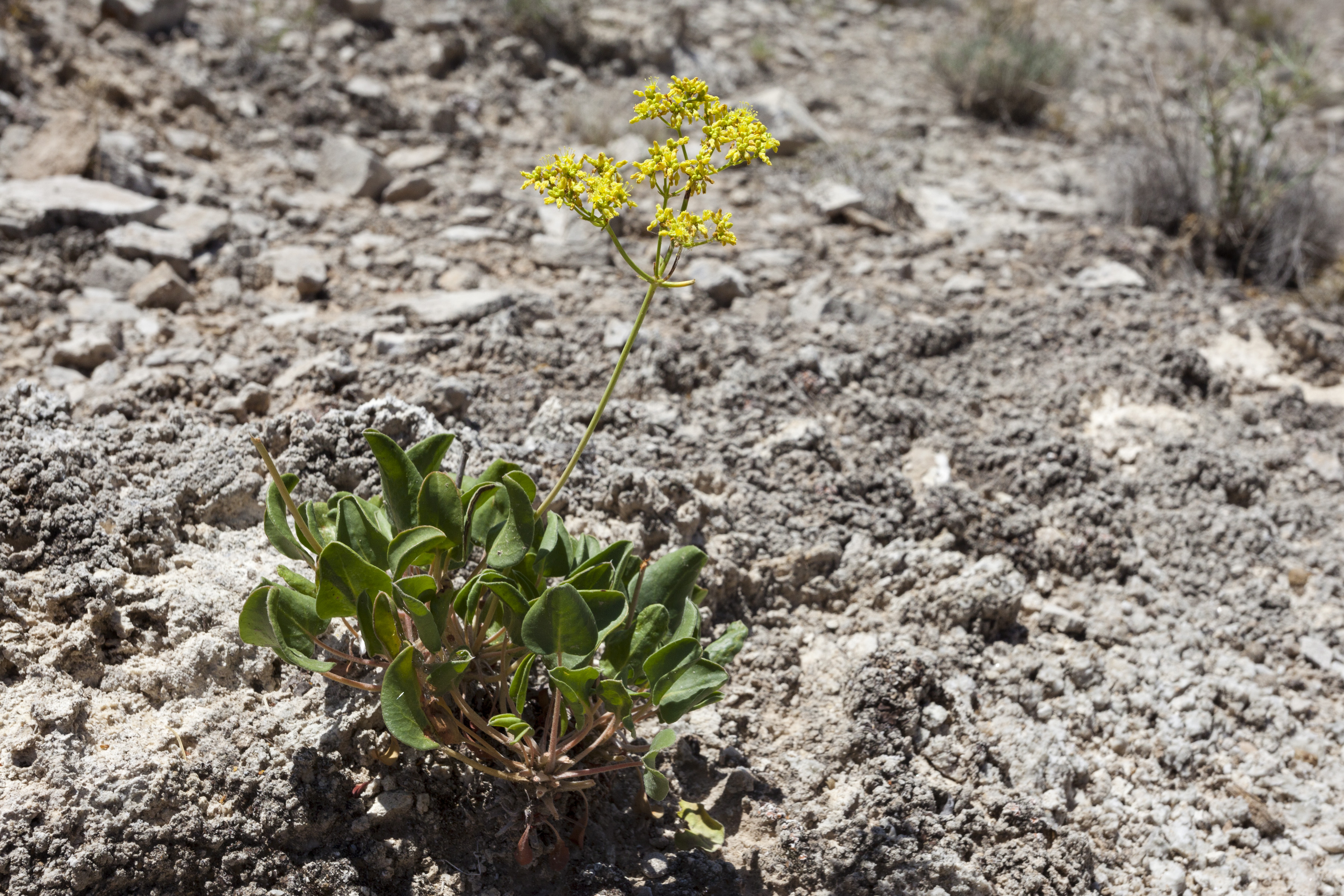

Conservation status
- Critically Imperiled (NatureServe)

Scientific classification
- Kingdom: Plantae
- Clade: Tracheophytes
- Clade: Angiosperms
- Clade: Eudicots
- Order: Caryophyllales
- Family: Polygonaceae
- Genus: Eriogonum
- Species: E. gypsophilum

Binomial name
- Eriogonum gypsophilum Wooton & Standl.

= Eriogonum gypsophilum =

Species of wild buckwheat

Eriogonum gypsophilum is a rare species of wild buckwheat known by the common names Seven River Hills buckwheat and gypsum wild buckwheat. It is endemic to the state of New Mexico in the United States, where it is known from only three sites in Eddy County. It is limited to a specific type of soil which is high in gypsum. The plant has been federally listed as a threatened species of the United States since 1981.

== Habitat and range ==
This rare plant can be found at three locations in Eddy County, New Mexico: the Seven River Hills, the Black River, and the Ben Slaughter Draw, a small, sloping valley. The plant only grows on gypsum substrates, including outcrops of gypsum rock and areas with gypsum soils. There are few other plants in this barren, rocky habitat, except for other gypsophiles. Plants that grow with the buckwheat on this nearly pure gypsum substrate include Tiquilia hispidissima, Mentzelia humilis, and Anulocaulis leiosolenus. This area is within the Chihuahuan Desert and surrounding habitat includes creosote scrub.

== Description ==
This plant is a perennial herb which usually reproduces vegetatively, by producing new stems from its rhizome, in effect cloning itself. Sometimes it reproduces sexually by making seed, however, the habitat and climate where it grows is often unsuitable for germination. Because many plants are clones rather than separate genetic individuals it is difficult to estimate the true number of plants existing. One estimate suggests there are 11,000 to 18,000 plants in each of the three populations. It is possible that more populations exist in unsurveyed gypsum rock habitat across the Eddy County border, in the state of Texas, but much of this habitat is on private land and is not open for exploration.

This wild buckwheat species produces erect stems up to 20 centimeters tall and bearing inflorescences of many tiny bright yellow flowers in headlike clusters or cymes. The base of the plant is surrounded by a mat of green leaves growing on the branching caudex.

== Conservation ==
The plant is found on an area of land measuring under 250 acres (1.0 km^{2}) total. Much of the plant's habitat, including half of the Black River and Ben Slaughter Draw tracts and most all of the Seven River Hills, is protected within the bounds of Bureau of Land Management oversight. In addition, the BLM will manage this land through the year 2028, even if the plant loses federal protection. The main threat to the species is habitat destruction during gypsum mining and oil and gas exploration, but this is prevented in BLM territory. There was only one population of the plant known in 1981 when it was federally listed; the other two have been discovered since, increasing the known abundance. In 2007, this factor, plus the lack of threats to the species as long as BLM protection is in place, led the United States Fish and Wildlife Service to suggest the species be delisted, or removed from the endangered species list.
