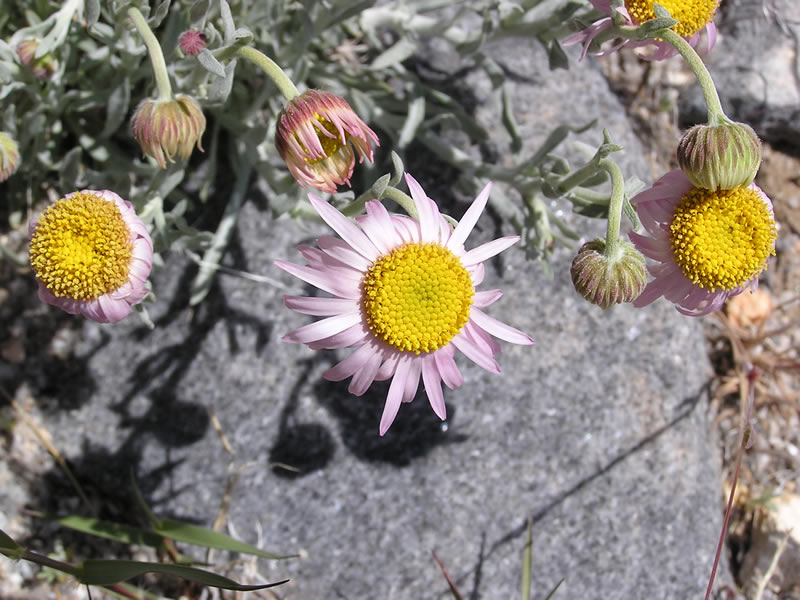

Conservation status
- Threatened (ESA)

Scientific classification
- Kingdom: Plantae
- Clade: Embryophytes
- Clade: Tracheophytes
- Clade: Angiosperms
- Clade: Eudicots
- Clade: Asterids
- Order: Asterales
- Family: Asteraceae
- Genus: Erigeron
- Species: E. parishii

Binomial name
- Erigeron parishii A.Gray

= Erigeron parishii =

Species of flowering plant

Erigeron parishii is a species of flowering plant in the family Asteraceae known by the common names Parish's daisy and Parish's fleabane.

== Distribution ==
Erigeron parishii is native to San Bernardino County and Riverside County in southern California. It is a federally-listed threatened species losing habitat to development and the limestone mining industry on the north slope of the San Bernardino Mountains.

== Description ==
Erigeron parishii is a small perennial herb reaching a maximum height of about 30 centimeters (12 inches). The taproot can penetrate the carbonate soils to a depth of 50 cm (19.5 in). Its stem and foliage are covered in silvery-white hairs and most of the leaves are basal and measure 3 to 6 centimeters (1.2 to 2.4 inches) long.

The erect stems have inflorescences of one to ten flower heads, each between one and two centimeters (0.4-0.8 inches) wide. The flower head has a center of golden yellow disc florets and a fringe of up to 55 lavender, pink, or white ray florets.

== Ecology ==
Erigeron parishii usually grows on limestone substrates, or granite topped with a layer of limestone. It apparently requires very alkaline soils.

== Conservation ==
The same rock that the plant favors is also sought after for human use and limestone mining is the most significant threat to its habitat.

Erigeron parishii has a relatively high genetic diversity for a narrow endemic, a measure that will decrease with the habitat fragmentation that currently threatens it.
