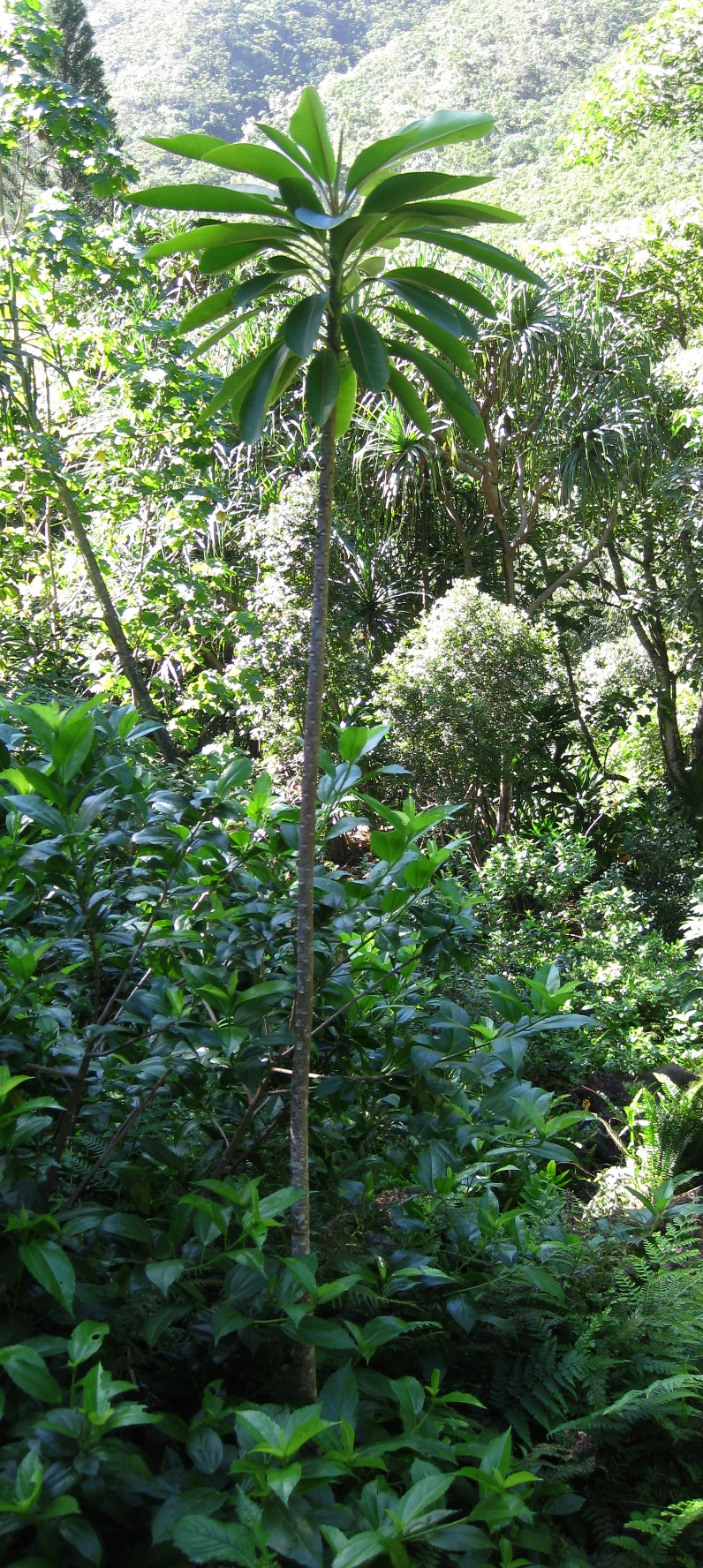

Conservation status
- Endangered (IUCN 3.1)

Scientific classification
- Kingdom: Plantae
- Clade: Tracheophytes
- Clade: Angiosperms
- Clade: Eudicots
- Clade: Rosids
- Order: Malpighiales
- Family: Euphorbiaceae
- Genus: Euphorbia
- Species: E. haeleeleana

Binomial name
- Euphorbia haeleeleana D.R.Herbst

= Euphorbia haeleeleana =

Kauaʻi spurge

Species of tree

Euphorbia haeleeleana, the Kauaʻi spurge, is a species of flowering plant in the croton family, Euphorbiaceae, that is endemic to the islands of Kauaʻi and Oaʻhu in Hawaii. Like other Hawaiian spurges it is known as ʻakoko.

It inhabits dry, coastal mesic, and mixed mesic forests from 205–670 m (673–2,198 ft). Associated plants include ʻōhiʻa lehua (Metrosideros polymorpha), koa (Acacia koa), lama (Diospyros sandwicensis), kukui (Aleurites moluccanus), ʻaʻaliʻi (Dodonaea viscosa), wiliwili (Erythrina sandwicensis), hala pepe (Dracaena spp.), ʻohe kukuluāeʻo (Reynoldsia sandwicensis), and āulu (Sapindus oahuensis). Kauaʻi Spurge is a small tree, reaching a height of 3–14 metres (9.8–45.9 ft).

It is threatened by habitat loss and disturbance. Feral pigs and goats damage the habitat and non-native plant species take hold there and compete for resources.
