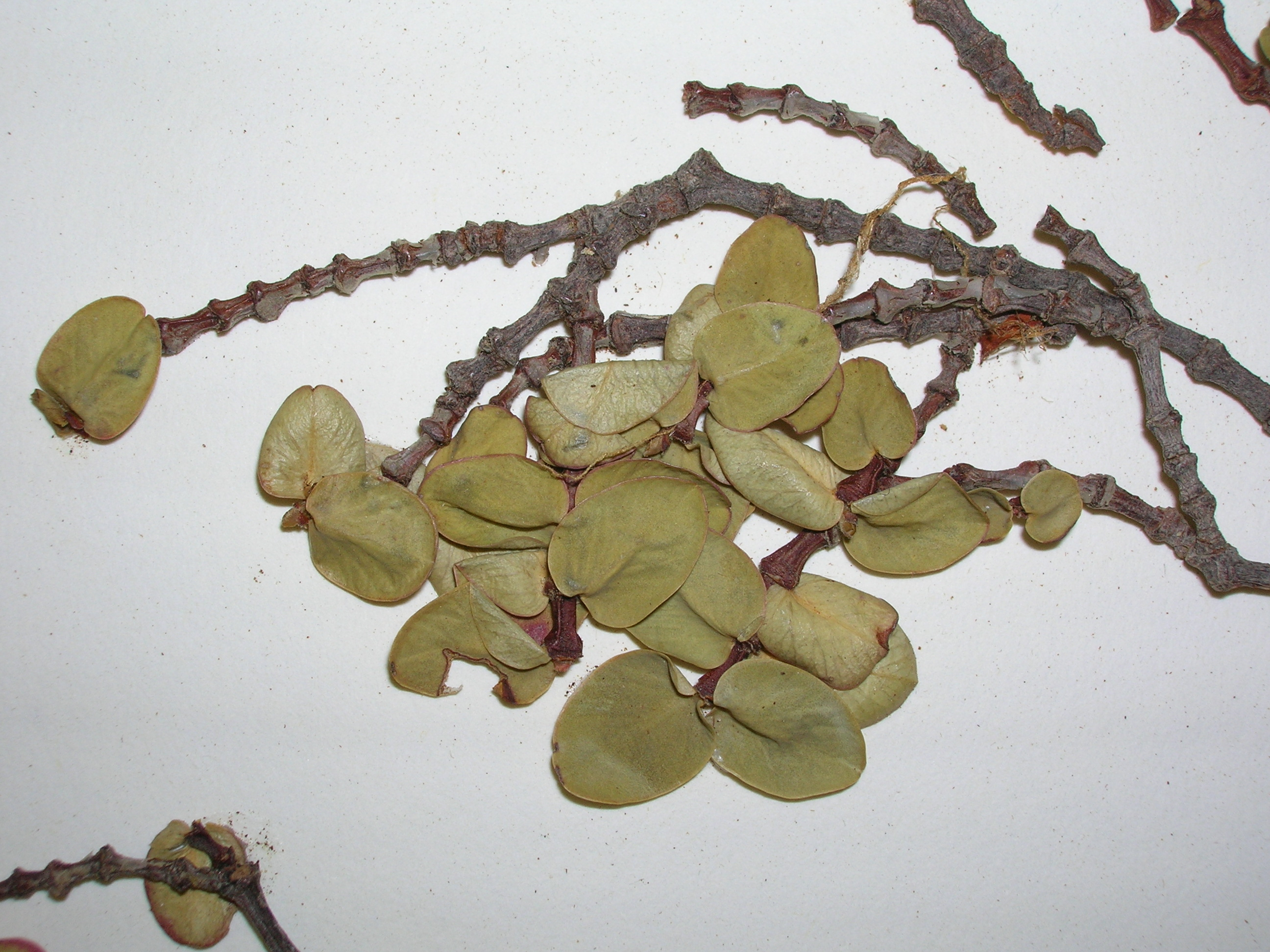
- herbarium specimen

Conservation status
- Critically Imperiled (NatureServe)

Scientific classification
- Kingdom: Plantae
- Clade: Tracheophytes
- Clade: Angiosperms
- Clade: Eudicots
- Clade: Rosids
- Order: Malpighiales
- Family: Euphorbiaceae
- Genus: Euphorbia
- Species: E. kuwaleana

Binomial name
- Euphorbia kuwaleana O. Deg. & Sherff

Synonyms
- Chamaesyce kuwaleana

= Euphorbia kuwaleana =

Species of flowering plant

Euphorbia kuwaleana (syn. Chamaesyce kuwaleana) is a rare species of flowering plant in the euphorb family known by the common name kokomalei. It is endemic to Oahu, Hawaii, where it is known only from a four-kilometer stretch of the Waianae Range. Like other Hawaiian euphorbs, this plant is known locally as `akoko. It is a federally listed endangered species of the United States.

This is a shrub that grows on bare, exposed basalt cliffs. The stems grow to a maximum length approaching one meter and they contain a milky sap. The new stems are reddish in color and age to a waxy gray. The leaves are oval to heart-shaped, up to 2.5 centimeters long, and slightly hairy on the undersides. The inflorescence is a cyathium occurring singly in the leaf axils or at the tip of the stem.

There are about 2000 plants remaining. They are threatened by non-native plants and fire.
