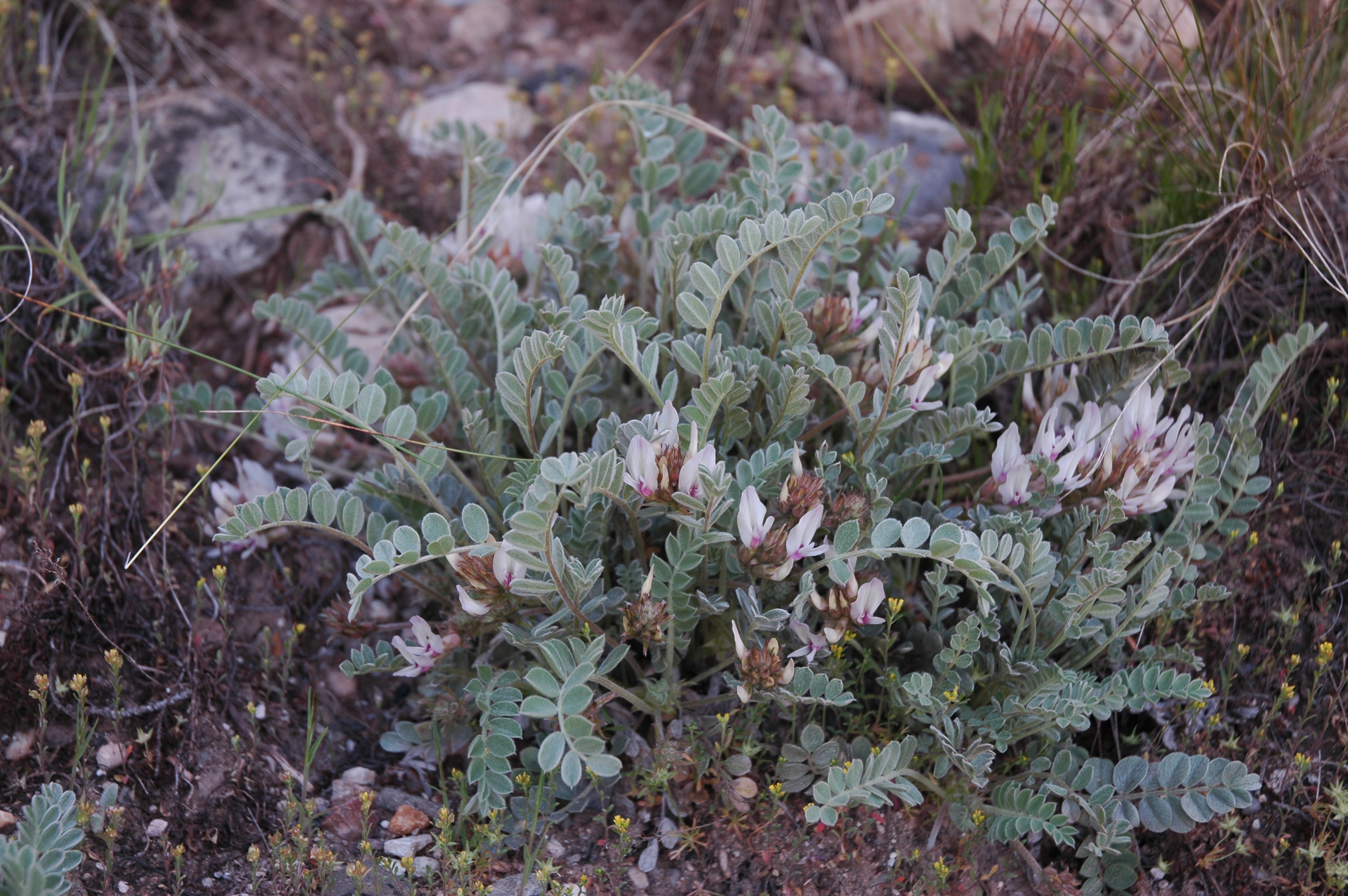

Conservation status
- Critically Imperiled (NatureServe)

Scientific classification
- Kingdom: Plantae
- Clade: Tracheophytes
- Clade: Angiosperms
- Clade: Eudicots
- Clade: Rosids
- Order: Fabales
- Family: Fabaceae
- Subfamily: Faboideae
- Genus: Astragalus
- Species: A. desereticus

Binomial name
- Astragalus desereticus Barneby

= Astragalus desereticus =

Species of legume

Astragalus desereticus is a rare species of milkvetch known by the common name Deseret milkvetch. It is endemic to Utah County, Utah, where it is known from only one population. It was thought to be extinct until 1981 when this population was discovered. The population contains 5,000 to 10,000 plants on an area of land covering less than 300 acres. It is vulnerable to damage from grazing cattle, which eat the plant and trample the soil, and from development and erosion. This is a federally listed threatened species.

This is a perennial herb with a short stem growing from a woody taproot and caudex unit. The leaves are up to 12 centimeters long and are made up of several leaflets up to 1.4 centimeters long. The foliage is coated in silvery-white hairs that make the plant pale in color. The inflorescence is a raceme of 5 to 10 flowers. Each is about 2 centimeters long and pinkish purple with darker tips on the petals. The fruit is a hairy legume pod about a centimeter long. The plant reproduces sexually by seed and cannot reproduce vegetatively.

This plant only occurs in the woodlands around Birdseye, Utah. Its numbers are thought to have increased in recent years, and the threats to its existence are not as severe as once reported, so the plant was proposed for removal from the Endangered Species List in 2017.

== Gallery ==
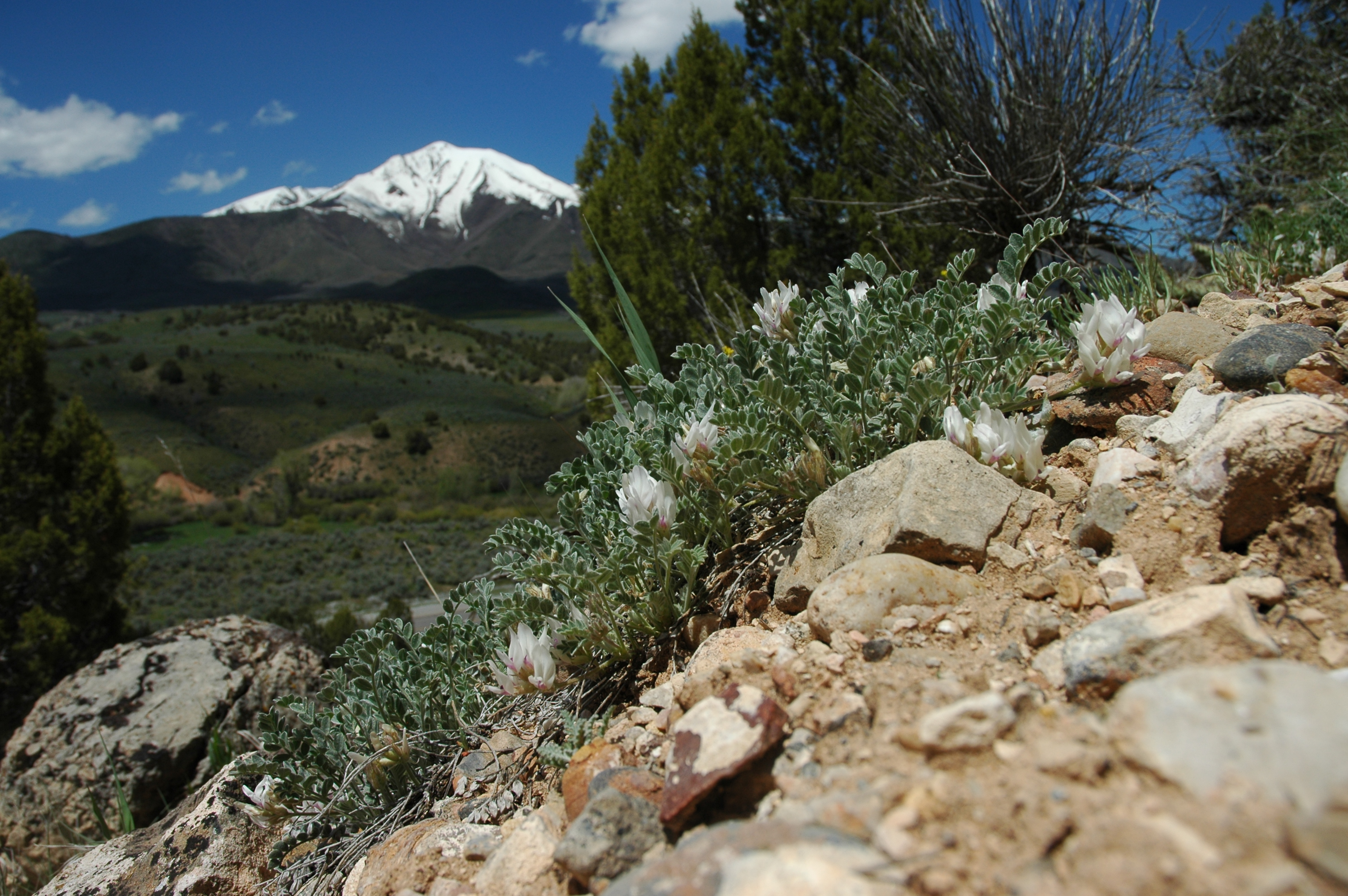
Montane habitat

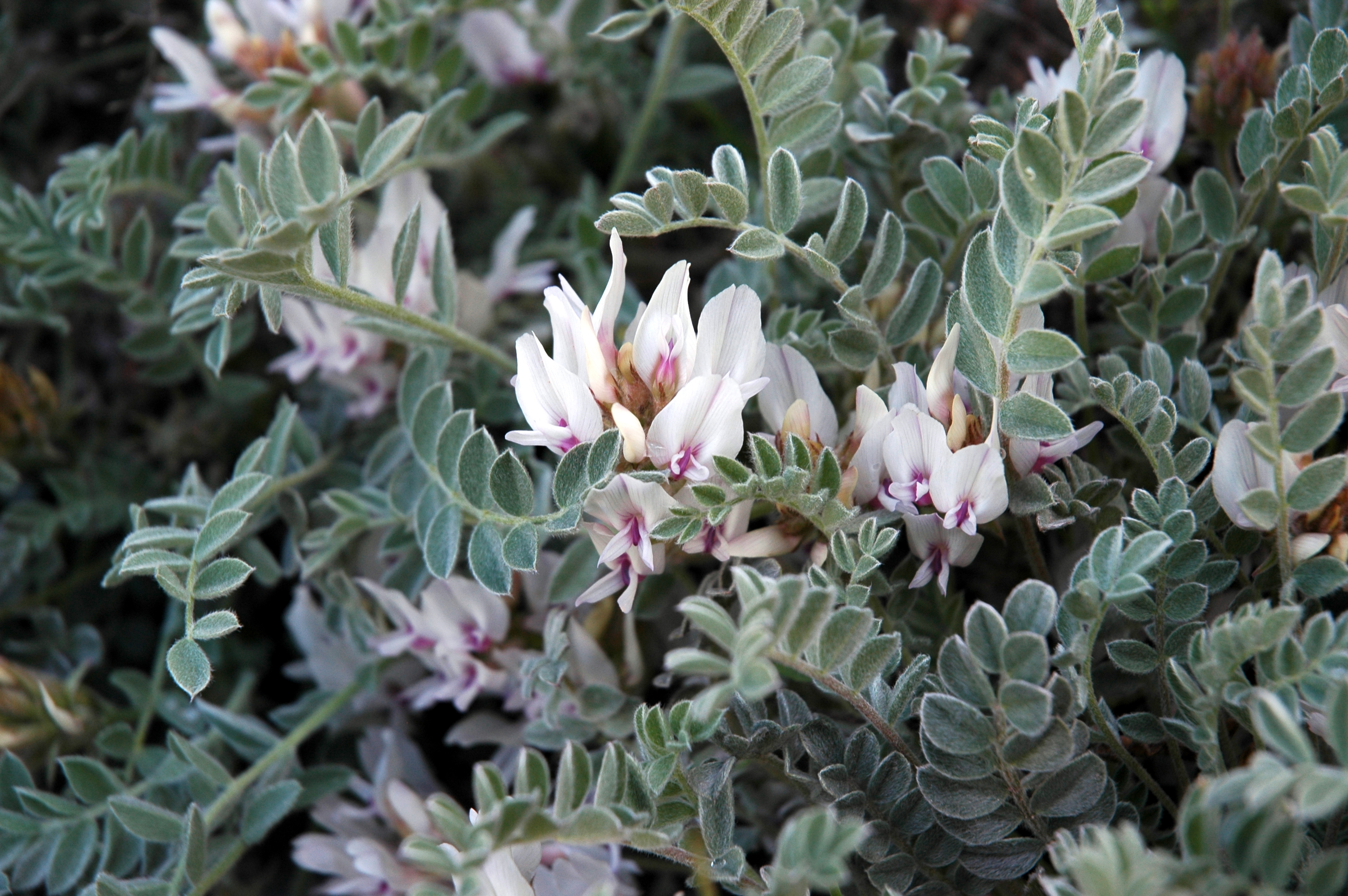
Mid-May foliage and flowers

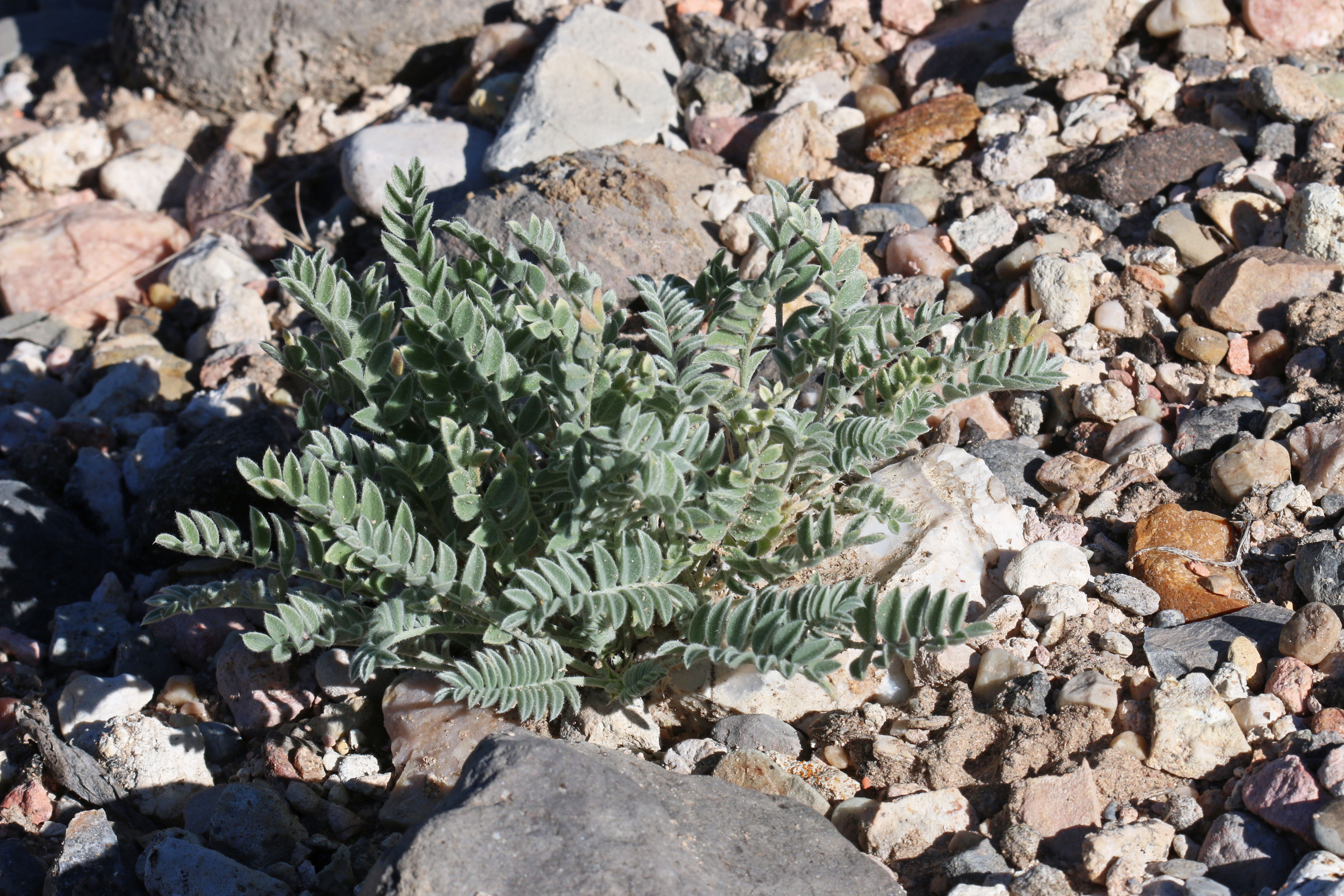
Foliage in late June
