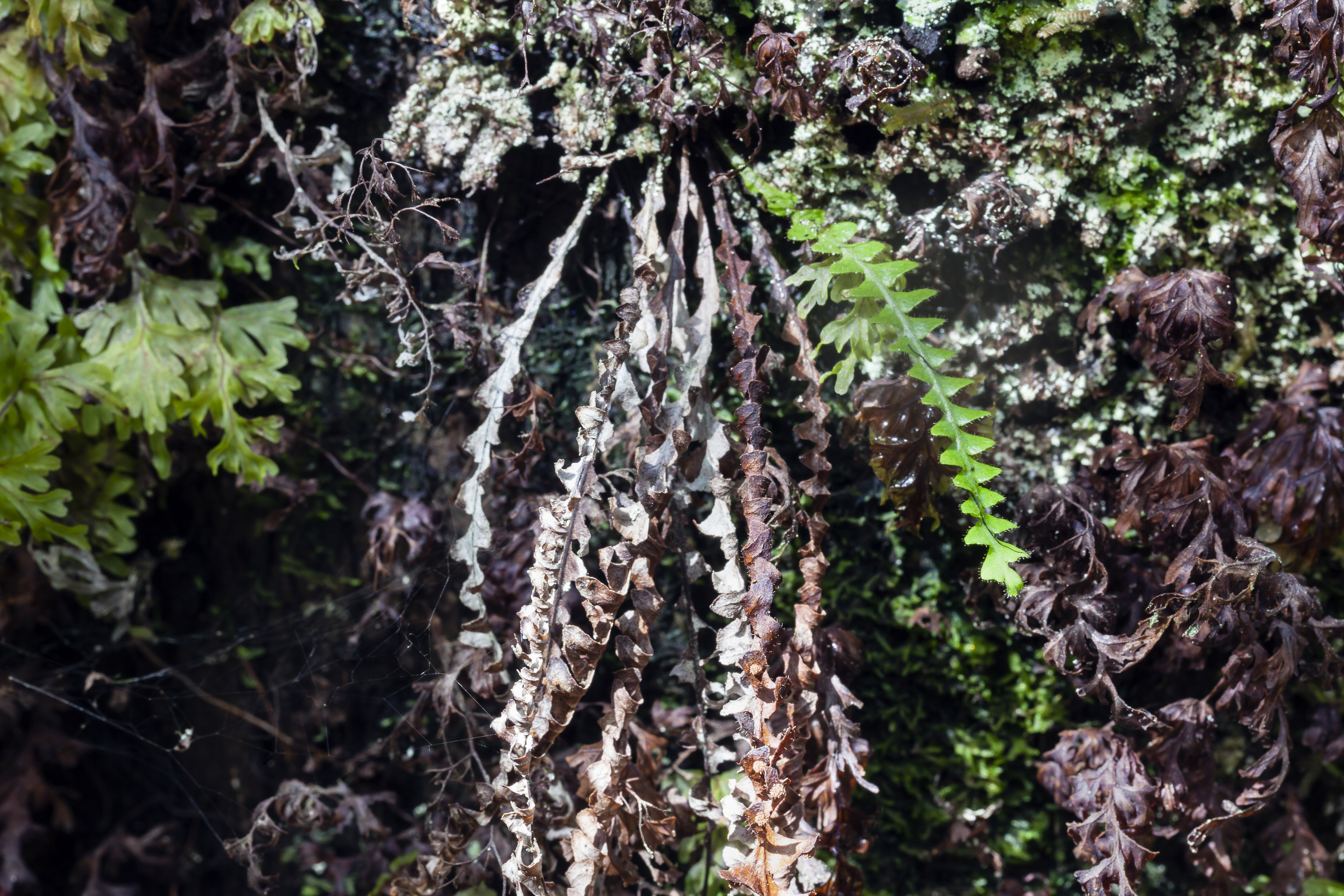

Conservation status
- Critically endangered, possibly extinct (IUCN 3.1)

- Critically Imperiled (NatureServe)

Scientific classification
- Kingdom: Plantae
- Clade: Tracheophytes
- Division: Polypodiophyta
- Class: Polypodiopsida
- Order: Polypodiales
- Suborder: Polypodiineae
- Family: Polypodiaceae
- Genus: Adenophorus
- Species: A. periens

Binomial name
- Adenophorus periens L.E.Bishop

= Adenophorus periens =

Species of fern

Adenophorus periens is a rare species of fern known by the common name pendant kihi fern. It is endemic to Hawaii, where it is known from one population in Puna on the island of Hawaii and a few occurrences on Kauai and Molokai. The fern occurs in wet mountain forests on volcanic slopes. It grows on trees. There are perhaps 2000 individual plants remaining. This is a federally listed endangered species of the United States.

This fern is easily distinguished from others in its genus, with its long, hanging fronds that may exceed 40 centimeters in length, twice as long as other Adenophorus. The leaflets on the fronds are twisted at an angle to the rachis and the leaf edges are lined with unique hairs. Genetic analysis reveals that the fern has a high genetic diversity for such a rare species.

Threats to the species include lava and gas from the volcanoes on which it grows, as well as the death of its host trees, introduced species including weeds and feral pigs, and geothermal development.
