= Astragalus claranus =

Conservation status
- Endangered (ESA)

Scientific classification
- Kingdom: Plantae
- Clade: Tracheophytes
- Clade: Angiosperms
- Clade: Eudicots
- Clade: Rosids
- Order: Fabales
- Family: Fabaceae
- Subfamily: Faboideae
- Genus: Astragalus
- Species: A. claranus

Binomial name
- Astragalus claranus Jeps.

Species of legume

Astragalus claranus (orth. var. A. clarianus) is a rare species of milkvetch known by the common names Clara Hunt's milkvetch and Napa milkvetch. It is endemic to northern California where it is known from only four or five occurrences along the border between Sonoma and Napa Counties. It is a federally listed endangered species.

== Description ==
This is an annual herb producing thin stems covered in tiny rough hairs. The plant reaches up to 12 cm (4.7 in) tall. The small leaves are made up of a few pairs of oval-shaped leaflets. The inflorescence is a small cluster of two to seven flowers. Each flower is about 1 cm (0.39 in) long and has white petals with bright deep purple tips. The fruit is a papery legume pod around 2 cm (0.79 in) long. It is tapered at both ends, hairy in texture, and it bears a sharp beak at one end.

== Taxonomy ==
The species was first described by Willis Linn Jepson in 1925. The plant was named for the California schoolteacher and amateur botanist Clara Adele Pike Blodgett Hunt. Jepson spelt the specific epithet clarianus, but Article 60.7 of the International Code of Nomenclature for algae, fungi, and plants requires an i not to be added when the name of the person ends in a vowel, so the International Plant Names Index has corrected the spelling to claranus.

== Ecology ==
This rare plant faces several threats, including invasive species, urban development, the establishment of vineyards in its habitat, grazing, trampling, alterations in the water regime, recreation, and road and airport maintenance activities.
