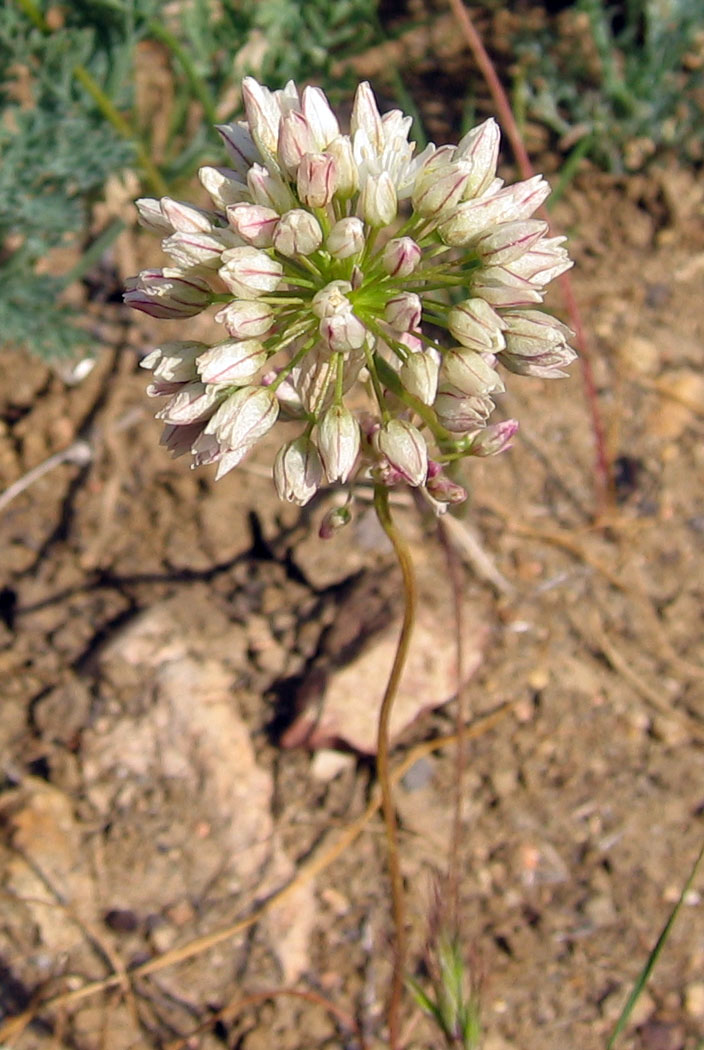

Conservation status
- Endangered (ESA)

Scientific classification
- Kingdom: Plantae
- Clade: Tracheophytes
- Clade: Angiosperms
- Clade: Monocots
- Order: Asparagales
- Family: Amaryllidaceae
- Subfamily: Allioideae
- Genus: Allium
- Subgenus: A. subg. Amerallium
- Species: A. munzii

Binomial name
- Allium munzii (Ownbey ex Traub) McNeal

Synonyms
- Allium fimbriatum var. munzii Ownbey & Aase ex Traub

= Allium munzii =

Munz's onion

Species of flowering plant

Allium munzii, also known by its common name, Munz's onion, is a bulb forming perennial herb endemic to Western Riverside County, California. This flower is characterized by its umbrella-like shape and flower clusters. Allium munzii is listed as endangered under the Endangered Species Act as of 1998. There are thirteen known populations in existence, and the latest population count stands at 20,000-70,000 individuals, counted in 1998. Major threats to this flower include urbanization, agriculture, clay mining, and other human activities. A recovery plan for Allium munzii is not in motion but there are steps being taken to protect this species.

== Description ==
Allium munzii is a capsule herb that grows up to 35.5 cm (14.0 in) tall. It is classified as an umbel which is a flower cluster that resembles an umbrella. Each cluster generally has 10-35 flowers. The base of the flower petals have white and pink or green mid veins, which then become a deep pink up the flower. Allium munzii only blooms during March, April, and May of each year. It is endemic to the western part of Riverside County, California.

== Life history ==
Allium munzii is a perennial plant that is a part of the lily family. It has a normal plant life cycle spanning over two years. Germination begins from a reddish-brown bulb underground. Each plant takes around three to five years to reach sexual maturity. Adequate rainfall is necessary for the plant to bloom due to soil moisture requirements. Allium munzii only blooms in grassy openings found in coastal-sage scrub. The bulb must be found in wet clay soils, or it will stay dormant. When those conditions are met, the plant stalk will begin to grow above ground and a single tube-shaped, hollow leaf will emerge. The plant starts as small white flowers, then as the season changes the mid veins begin to turn pink, and eventually the plant becomes completely pink. Once the plant has bloomed, it will shrink back into its bulb and remain underground for the remainder of the year.

== Ecology ==
=== Pollinators ===
Information on the pollinators of Allium munzii is very limited. It is likely that insects serve as pollinators for Allium munzii. Small flower beetles have been found near a significant portion of Allium munzii populations indicating a possible role in pollination. A photograph from 2011 showed March flies on flowering Allium munzii, which are known to pollinate other plants. Despite this evidence, neither flower beetles nor March flies have a confirmed role in the pollination of Allium munzii.

=== Habitat ===
The Munz' onion's preferred habitat is restricted to wet mesic clay at altitudes between 400 and 900 meters (1,300 and 3,000 ft) in elevation. The wet mesic clay allows Allium munzii to live underground to avoid harsh seasons. The preferred climate is characterized by cool, moist winters and hot, dry summers. Due to the restrictive nature of Allium munzii's habitat, habitats are only found in Western Riverside County, California.

=== Range ===
Due to the restrictive nature of Allium munzii's habitat there are only 13 surviving populations, all located in California. The estimated 20,000-70,000 remaining Allium munzii individuals are located along the southern edge of the Riverside-Perris area in Western Riverside County, California.

In past years, Allium munzii had a much broader range but due to human related activities like urbanization, agriculture, and clay mining, Allium munzii's habitats have been encroached upon and destroyed. The restriction of Allium munzii habitat has greatly threatened its populations.

== Conservation ==
=== Population size ===
The latest population count from 1998 stands between 20,000 and 70,000 individuals. Number of individuals has not been counted since. General populations have been assessed since, counted at 13 populations in 2004. Many of these populations contain less than 1,000 individuals. Since these counts, there have been reports of development and clay mining on land that is possibly a habitat for Allium munzii so the number is likely lower.

=== Geographical distribution ===
Allium munzii is endemic to Western Riverside County, California between the elevations of 366 to 1,067 meters (1,201 to 3,501 ft) above sea level. In this county, they are found along the southern edge of the Perris Basin area and also in parts of the Santa Ana Mountains. Current populations are found scattered along the Perris Basin, though historically they may have been along the entire Perris Basin. Allium munzii are often found in similar habitat patterns with a similar onion, A. haematochin. While these two species are found within feet of one another, they have not been found to interbreed.

=== Major threats ===
Allium munzii is reserved to a specific habitat and depends on undisturbed clay soils. These requirements can be lost easily due to human activity and these microhabitats have been severely harmed over the years. Although other factors like disease, predation, and climate change have impacted the populations of Allium munzii, the destruction of their habitats has had the most dramatic impacts. Some major threats to these habitats include urbanization and agricultural development, clay mining, off-road vehicles, and highway construction.

Urbanization, including golf course and housing development, has eliminated populations of Allium munzii. Development in Riverside County continues to this day. Agricultural development in this area is dominated by citrus farming. One instance of this citriculture directly caused the elimination of one habitat of this plant prior to its listing on its ESA. Clay mining threatens this species because it removes native soils, compacts remaining soil, and damages habitats.

New threats to this species are nonnative species and climate change. While there has not been one identified nonnative species associated with the decline of Allium munzii populations, some invasive annual grasses have created competition for space and resources. Climate change poses a threat due to the increased chance of wildfires that could disturb this habitat and harm the necessary soils that Allium munzii needs to bloom.

=== Listing under the ESA ===
In January 1990, the state of California listed Allium munzii as endangered under the California Endangered Species Act. Allium munzii was petitioned to be listed as endangered under the United States Endangered Species Act (ESA) on December 15, 1994, and was listed as endangered under the ESA on October 13, 1998.

=== Five-year review ===
The most recent completed five-year review for Allium munzii was released September 5, 2013. Prior to 2013, the only other five-year review was released June 17, 2009. A third five-year review was initiated May 20, 2021 but has not yet been released. The 2013 five-year review did not recommend a change in status from endangered. Due to the high recovery potential of this species, they changed the recovery priority number from 2C to 8C, indicating that there is slightly less concern about the status of this species.

To continue future conservation for this species, the most recent five-year review recommends regulation of threats, surveying of nonnative plant species, and identification of pollinators of Allium munzii.

=== Species status assessment ===
A species status assessment is not yet available.

=== Recovery plan and conservation efforts ===
A full recovery plan has not yet been developed for this species. However, Allium munzii conservation is covered by the Western Riverside County Multiple Species Habitat Conservation Plan. This was implemented in 2004 and includes a 75-year permit for conservation measures to help 146 species in Western Riverside County. A majority of recovery activity geared towards Allium munzii involves designating a critical habitat to protect an area with large populations from development and farming. A critical habitat was designated in 2005 and revised in 2013. This protected area spans 98.4 acres in Riverside County.

== See also ==
- California coastal sage and chaparral ecoregion
- Coastal sage scrub
