= Euphorbia halemanui =

Conservation status
- Critically Imperiled (NatureServe)

Scientific classification
- Kingdom: Plantae
- Clade: Tracheophytes
- Clade: Angiosperms
- Clade: Eudicots
- Clade: Rosids
- Order: Malpighiales
- Family: Euphorbiaceae
- Genus: Euphorbia
- Species: E. halemanui

Binomial name
- Euphorbia halemanui Sherff

Synonyms
- Chamaesyce halemanui

Species of flowering plant

Euphorbia halemanui (syn. Chamaesyce halemanui) is a rare species of flowering plant in the euphorb family known by the common name Kauai sandmat. It is endemic to Kauaʻi, Hawaii, where there are no more than 400 plants remaining. There are four populations at last count. It is a federally listed endangered species.

This is a shrub with vining, climbing stems that bleed a milky sap. The inflorescence is a single cyathium or a dense cluster of many. It and other Hawaiian euphorbs perform C4 carbon fixation.

This rare plant grows in moist forested slopes on Kauaʻi. The forests are often dominated by koa (Acacia koa) and ʻōhiʻa lehua (Metrosideros polymorpha). In other areas it grows alongside kauila (Alphitonia ponderosa), hame (Antidesma platyphyllum), ʻaʻaliʻi (Dodonaea viscosa), Kauai kokiʻo (Kokia kauaiensis), and other native plants.
