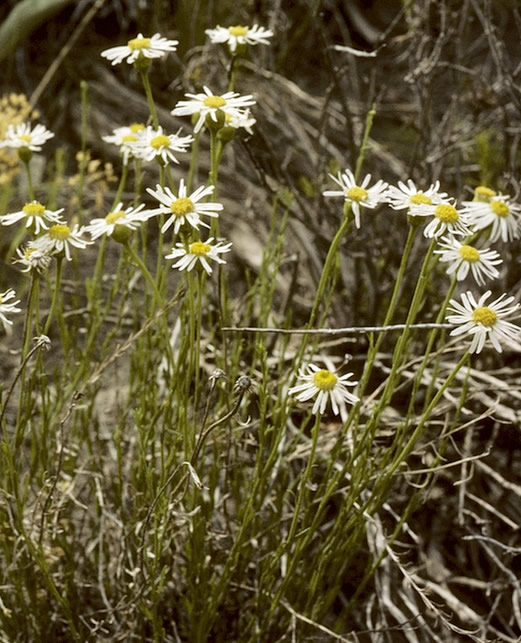

Conservation status
- Imperiled (NatureServe)

- Threatened (ESA)

Scientific classification
- Kingdom: Plantae
- Clade: Tracheophytes
- Clade: Angiosperms
- Clade: Eudicots
- Clade: Asterids
- Order: Asterales
- Family: Asteraceae
- Genus: Erigeron
- Species: E. rhizomatus

Binomial name
- Erigeron rhizomatus Cronquist

= Erigeron rhizomatus =

Species of flowering plant

Erigeron rhizomatus is a rare species of flowering plant in the family Asteraceae known by the common names Zuni fleabane and rhizome fleabane. It is native to western New Mexico and eastern Arizona in the United States. It is a federally listed threatened species.

Erigeron rhizomatus was thought to be a New Mexico endemic until 1999, when some plants were found over the border in Arizona. These are located in the Chuska Mountains on the Navajo Nation, and they occur in 15 populations that make up one metapopulation. The two previously known metapopulations in New Mexico are composed of 24 populations in the Zuni, Datil, and Sawtooth Mountains. These three metapopulations are geographically isolated from each other but are still similar in morphology.

== Characteristics ==
Erigeron rhizomatus is a perennial herb up to 45 cm (18 inches) tall, with a rhizome and large network of clumped, fibrous roots topped with a branching caudex. It produces one or more erect, rough-haired stems up to about 45 centimeters (18 inches) in maximum height. The leaves are lance-shaped near the base of the plant and much narrower and linear in shape toward the top of the stem. The inflorescence is usually a single flower head at the end of the stem with 25–45 white or purple-tinged ray florets each under a centimeter long. These surround many yellow disc florets.

== Habitat ==
Erigeron rhizomatus grows in selenium-rich sandstone substrates that originate in the Baca and Chinle Formations. It occurs in barren outcrops of eroding red or grayish rock that may have slopes of up to 40 degrees. Nearby plants include four-wing saltbush (Atriplex canescens), mountain mahogany (Cercocarpus montanus), rubber rabbitbrush (Ericameria nauseosa), oneseed juniper (Juniperus monosperma), Colorado pinyon (Pinus edulis), and Gambel oak (Quercus gambelii).

== Conservation ==
When Erigeron rhizomatus was listed for federal protection, it was potentially threatened by uranium mining activity in its habitat. There is probably still uranium in the area, as evidenced by large amounts of selenium in the soil, which often occurs with uranium. If the value of uranium increases and it becomes a target for mining, the activity could threaten the plant's habitat. One population of the plant also occurs in an area with potential for oil exploration activity. These are the only significant threats to the species at this time, but since it is a rare regional endemic known from specific habitat types it will stay on the endangered species list for the time being.
