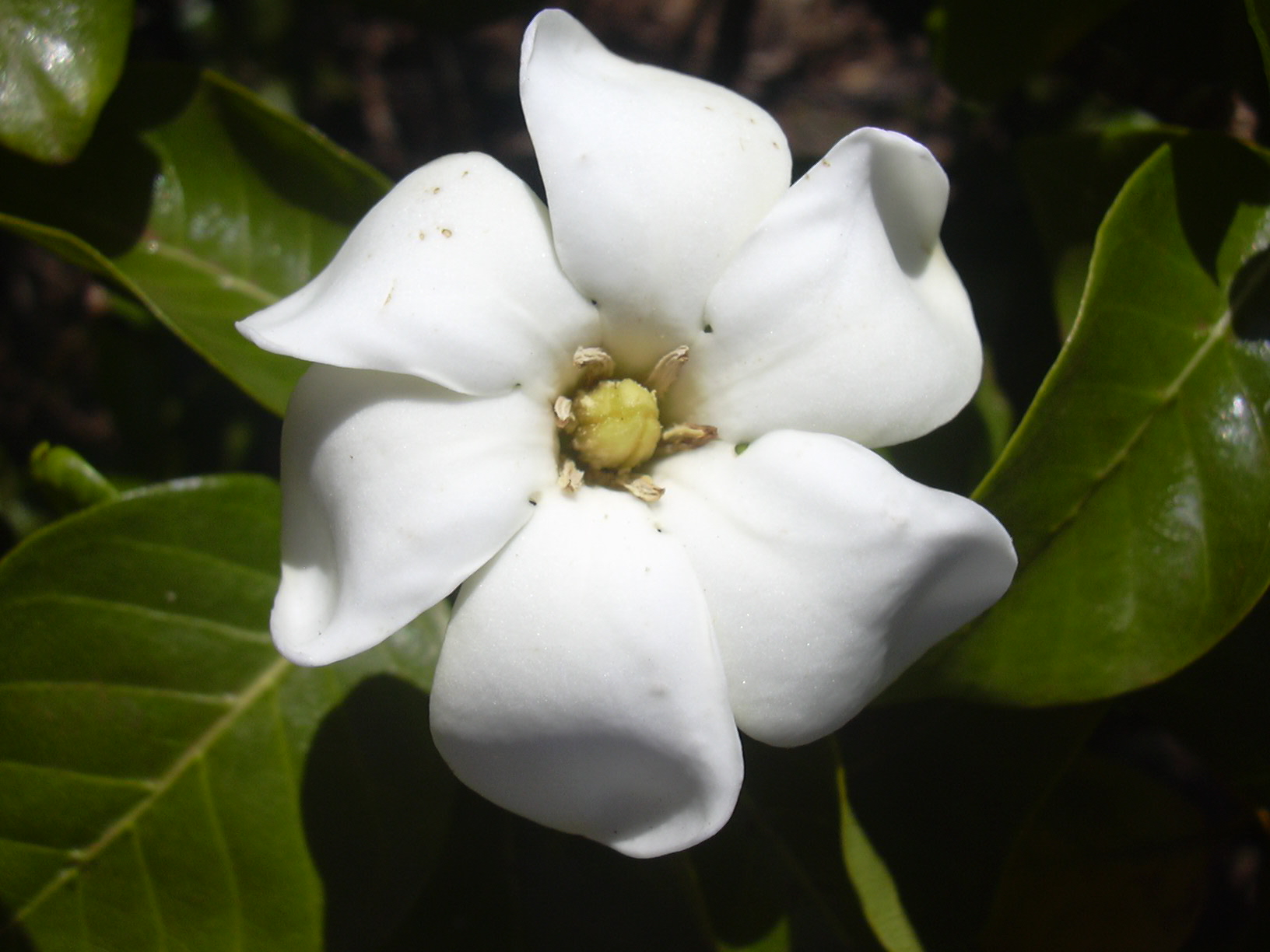

Conservation status
- Critically Endangered (IUCN 3.1)

Scientific classification
- Kingdom: Plantae
- Clade: Tracheophytes
- Clade: Angiosperms
- Clade: Eudicots
- Clade: Asterids
- Order: Gentianales
- Family: Rubiaceae
- Genus: Gardenia
- Species: G. brighamii

Binomial name
- Gardenia brighamii H.Mann

= Gardenia brighamii =

Species of plant

Gardenia brighamii is a species of flowering plant in the coffee family, Rubiaceae. It is sometimes referred to by the common names nānū, naʻu, or forest gardenia, and is endemic to Hawaii.

== Description ==
Gardenia brighamii is a small tree, reaching a height of 5 m (16 ft). The glossy, dark green leaves are ovate, 2.2–10.5 cm (0.87–4.13 in) long and 1.5–5.5 cm (0.59–2.17 in) wide. The petals of the solitary, white flowers are fused at the base to form a tube 15–20 mm (0.59–0.79 in) in length and have six lobes.

=== Gallery ===
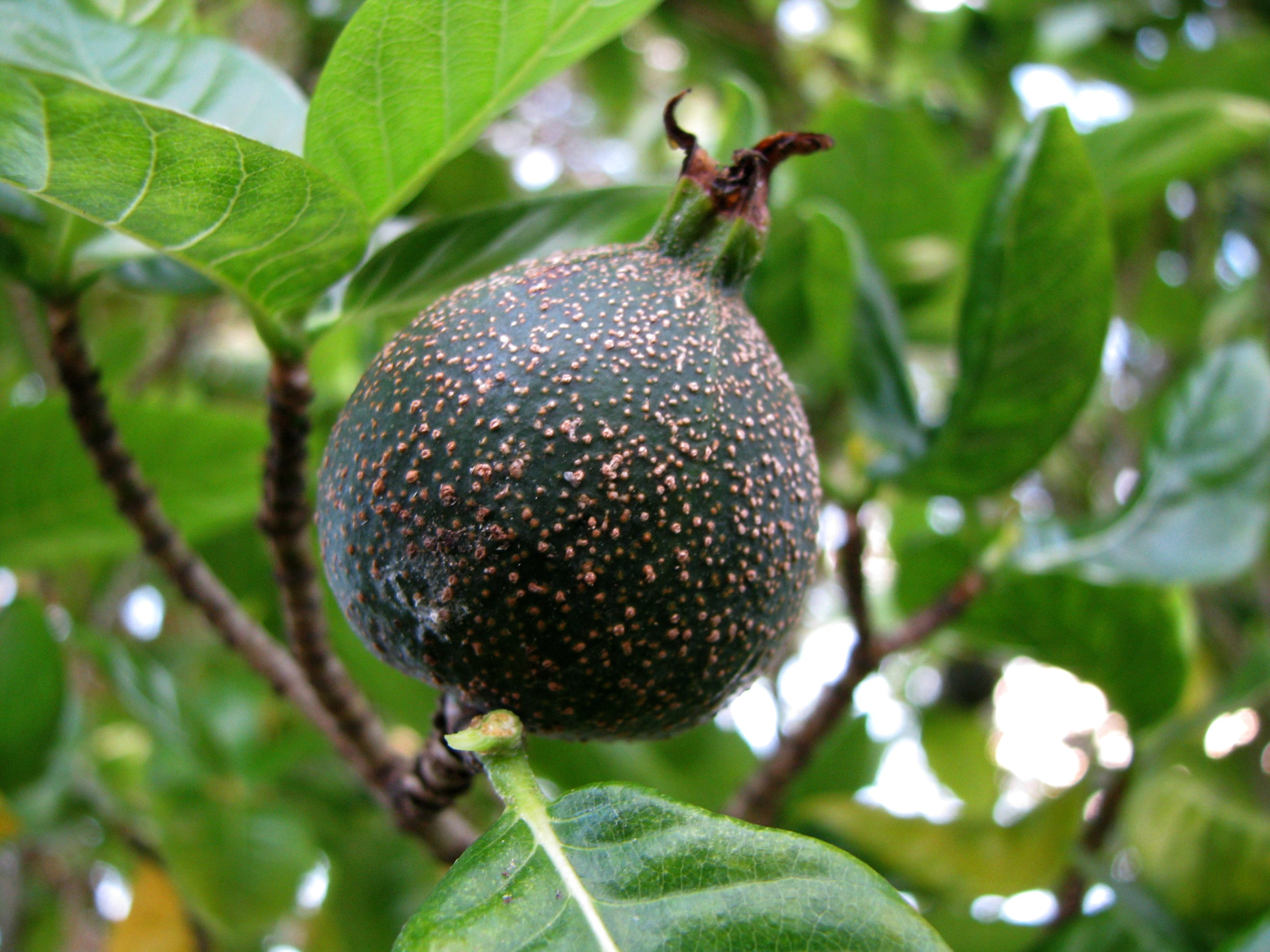
Fruits

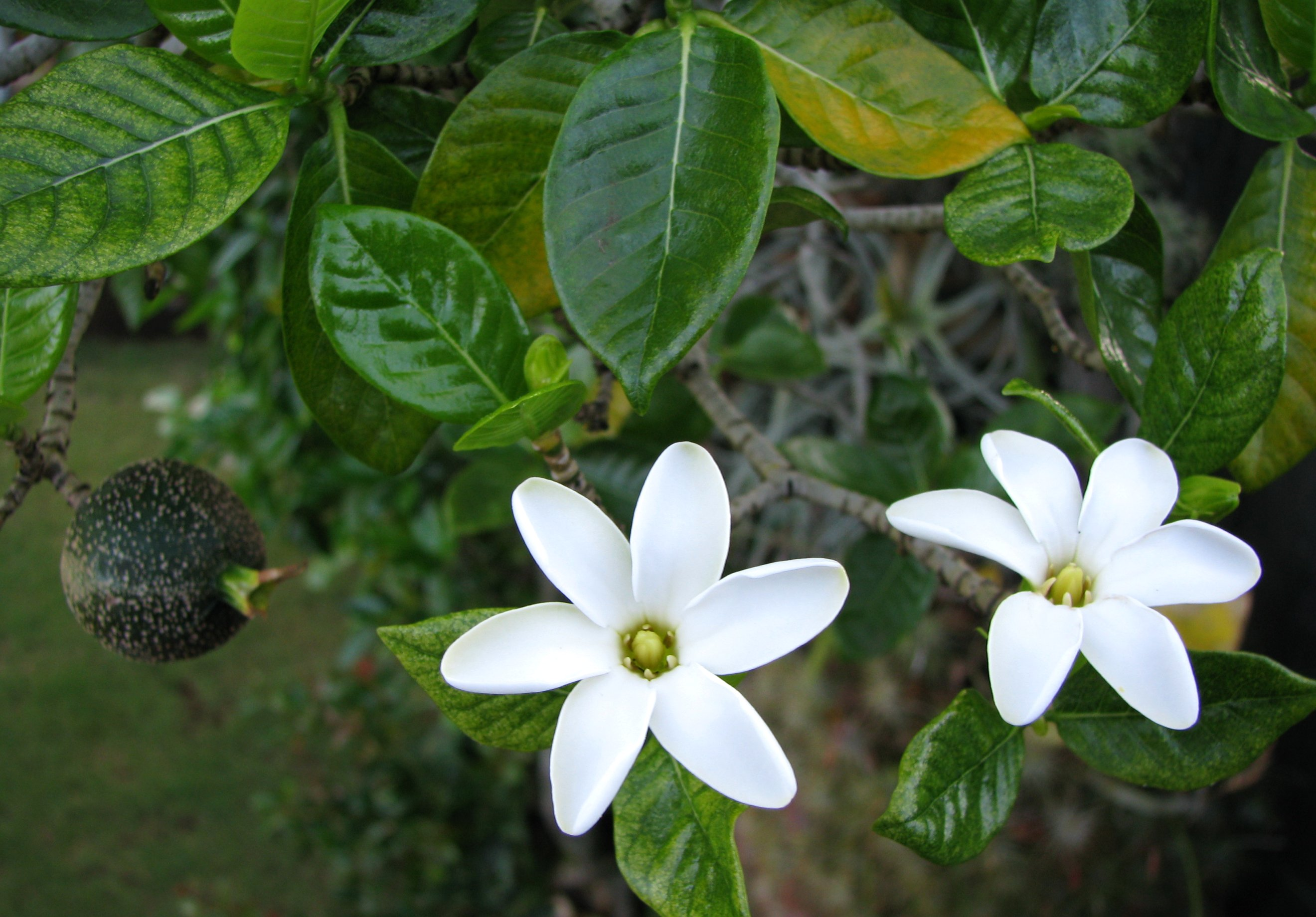
Flowers

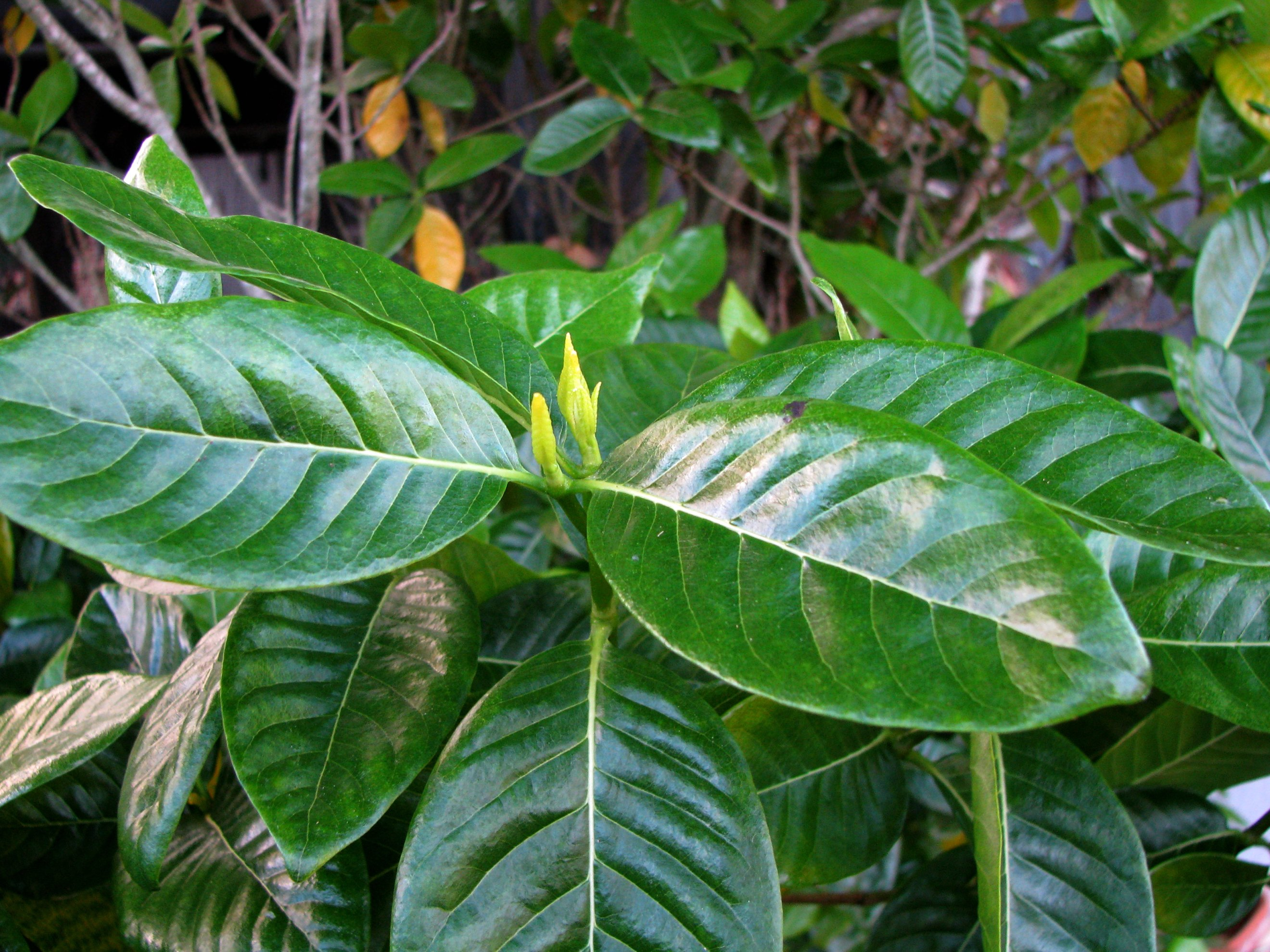
Leaves

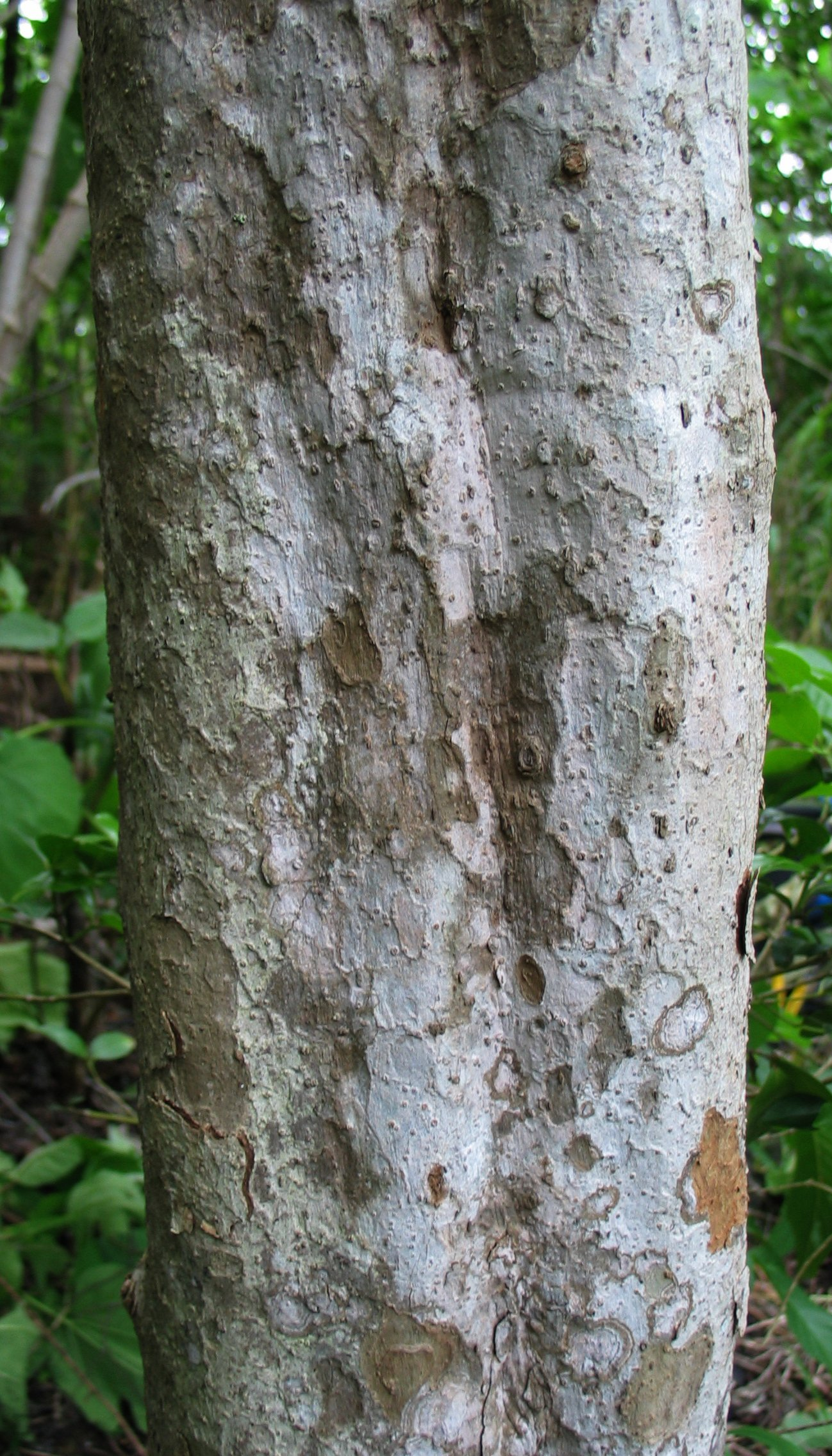
Bark

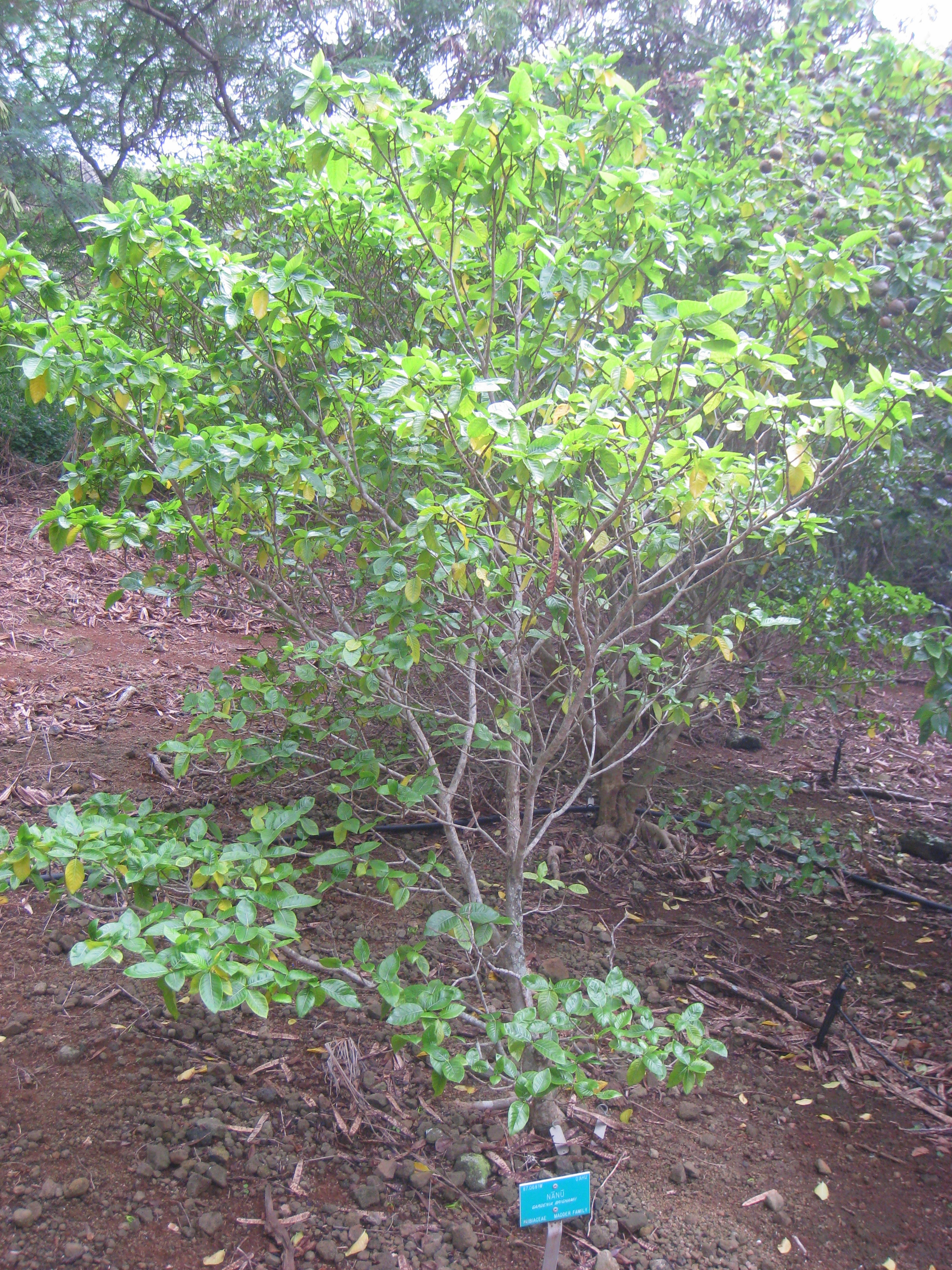
Plant

== Habitat and range ==
Forest gardenia inhabits tropical dry forests at elevations of 350–520 m (1,150–1,710 ft). It previously could be found on all main islands, but today populations only exist on Maui, Molokaʻi, Oʻahu, and Lānaʻi, and the Big Island.

== Conservation ==
The total population of G. brighamii is between 15 and 19 trees. There are only two plants in the wild on Oʻahu and one on the Big Island. Major threats to the survival of this species include loss of dry forest habitat and the establishment of invasive species, such as fountain grass (Pennisetum setaceum).

== Uses ==
Native Hawaiians made kua kuku (kapa anvils) and pou (house posts) from the wood of nānū. A yellow kapa dye was derived from the fruit pulp. The white, fragrant flowers are used in lei. Today, it is grown as an ornamental plant on the islands.
