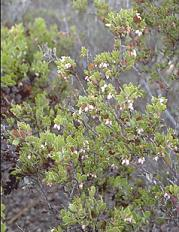

Conservation status
- Critically Imperiled (NatureServe)

- Threatened (ESA)

Scientific classification
- Kingdom: Plantae
- Clade: Tracheophytes
- Clade: Angiosperms
- Clade: Eudicots
- Clade: Asterids
- Order: Ericales
- Family: Ericaceae
- Genus: Arctostaphylos
- Species: A. myrtifolia

Binomial name
- Arctostaphylos myrtifolia Parry

= Arctostaphylos myrtifolia =

Species of flowering plant

Arctostaphylos myrtifolia is a rare species of manzanita known by the common name Ione manzanita. It is endemic to the Sierra Nevada foothills of California. It grows in the chaparral and woodland plant community on a distinctive acidic soil series, an oxisol of the Eocene-era Ione Formation, in western Amador and northern Calaveras counties. There are only eleven occurrences, of which three have not been recorded since 1976. This is a federally listed threatened species.

== Description ==
Arctostaphylos myrtifolia is a red-barked, bristly shrub reaching just over a meter in maximum height. The small bright green leaves are coated in tiny glandular hairs and are shiny but rough in texture. They are less than 2 centimeters long. The inflorescence is a raceme of urn-shaped manzanita flowers on bright red branches. The fruit is a cylindrical drupe only a few millimeters long.

== Conservation ==
A major threat to this rare endemic plant is a pair of fungal diseases. A branch canker caused by species of Fusicoccum, including F. aesculi, causes some mortality, and root and crown rot caused by Phytophthora cinnamomi has destroyed entire stands of the manzanita and prevented its regrowth in patches of infested soil. These microorganisms, as well as a newly identified one, Phytophthora cambivora, are spreading rapidly and may soon reach the entire range of the plant's distribution. Because of this threat, which may lead to the extinction of the species, the United States Fish and Wildlife Service has recommended that it be upgraded from threatened to endangered status.

== See also ==
- California chaparral and woodlands
- California interior chaparral and woodlands
