= Cyanea st.-johnii =

Conservation status
- Critically Endangered (IUCN 3.1)

Scientific classification
- Kingdom: Plantae
- Clade: Tracheophytes
- Clade: Angiosperms
- Clade: Eudicots
- Clade: Asterids
- Order: Asterales
- Family: Campanulaceae
- Genus: Cyanea
- Species: C. st.-johnii

Binomial name
- Cyanea st.-johnii (Hosaka) Lammers, Givnish & Sytsma

Synonyms
- Rollandia st.-johnii

Species of flowering plant

Cyanea st.-johnii (formerly Rollandia st.-johnii) is a rare species of flowering plant in the bellflower family known by the common name St. John's rollandia. It is endemic to Oahu, where it is known only from the Koʻolau Mountains. It is a federally listed endangered species of the United States. Like other Cyanea it is known as haha in Hawaiian.

A 2007 report estimates 70 remaining individuals divided among seven occurrences in the upper elevations of the Koʻolau Mountains. The plant grows on top of ridges, in open, windy habitat within the cloud zone. The occurrences have been separated and isolated by habitat fragmentation.

This Hawaiian lobelioid is a shrub growing 30 to 60 centimetres (12 to 24 in) tall and producing white flowers.
