= Cyanea koolauensis =

Conservation status
- Critically Imperiled (NatureServe)

Scientific classification
- Kingdom: Plantae
- Clade: Tracheophytes
- Clade: Angiosperms
- Clade: Eudicots
- Clade: Asterids
- Order: Asterales
- Family: Campanulaceae
- Genus: Cyanea
- Species: C. koolauensis

Binomial name
- Cyanea koolauensis Lammers, Givnish & Sytsma

Synonyms
- Rollandia angustifolia

Species of flowering plant

Cyanea koolauensis (formerly Rollandia angustifolia) is a rare species of flowering plant in the bellflower family known by the common names Palolo Valley rollandia and narrowleaf rollandia. It is native to Oahu, where it is known only from the Koʻolau Mountains. It is a federally listed endangered species. Like other Cyanea it is known as haha in Hawaiian.

This Hawaiian lobelioid is a shrub reaching 1 to 1.5 meters in height. It bears dark red flowers.

As of 2009 the plant was known from 10 small, scattered populations along the peaks of the Koʻolau Range, for a total of approximately 160 individual plants. Only one of these populations contains over 50 plants. Most of these populations are located on land used for military training operations. Threats to the species include trampling and fires associated with military activity, trampling by hikers, damage to the habitat caused by feral pigs, flooding, trail maintenance, and exotic plants such as Koster's curse (Clidemia hirta) and moho (Heliocarpus popayanensis).
