= Cyanea undulata =

Conservation status
- Critically Imperiled (NatureServe)

Scientific classification
- Kingdom: Plantae
- Clade: Tracheophytes
- Clade: Angiosperms
- Clade: Eudicots
- Clade: Asterids
- Order: Asterales
- Family: Campanulaceae
- Genus: Cyanea
- Species: C. undulata

Binomial name
- Cyanea undulata Forbes

Species of flowering plant

Cyanea undulata is a rare species of flowering plant in the bellflower family known by the common names wavy cyanea and leechleaf cyanea. It is endemic to the island of Kauai, where it is in rapid decline. It is a federally listed endangered species of the United States. Like other Cyanea it is known as haha in Hawaiian.

This Hawaiian lobelioid is a shrub which can exceed three meters in height. The leaves have wavy edges and the flowers are yellow.

The plant was first described in 1909 and then it was not seen again until it was rediscovered in 1991. In 1994 there was a single population containing 28 plants. By 2006 the population was in poor shape, with a single mature plant and a few juveniles remaining.

The species has become rare because of habitat degradation by feral pigs, exotic plant species, and damage to plants caused by rats and slugs.
