= Cyanea longiflora =

Conservation status
- Critically Imperiled (NatureServe)

- Critically Endangered (IUCN 3.1)

Scientific classification
- Kingdom: Plantae
- Clade: Tracheophytes
- Clade: Angiosperms
- Clade: Eudicots
- Clade: Asterids
- Order: Asterales
- Family: Campanulaceae
- Genus: Cyanea
- Species: C. longiflora

Binomial name
- Cyanea longiflora (Wawra) Lammers, Givnish & Sytsma

Synonyms
- Rollandia longiflora

Species of flowering plant

Cyanea longiflora (formerly Rollandia longiflora) is a rare species of flowering plant in the bellflower family known by the common name ridge rollandia. It is endemic to Oahu where there are only three remaining occurrences in the northern Waianae Mountains for a total of under 300 individuals. It is a federally listed endangered species. Like other Cyanea it is known as haha in Hawaiian.

This Hawaiian lobelioid is a shrub appearing palm-like in form and reaching 3 meters in maximum height. The inflorescence produces magenta flowers. The fruit is a berry which is purple to red when small and ripens to orange.

The US Fish and Wildlife Service stated in 2009 that a recent count revealed a total of 76 mature plants, plus 84 immature plants and 28 seedlings. The plant appears to be limited to the northern Waianae Mountains today and no longer survives in the Koʻolau Range, where a few populations had been known.

Threats to this species include its small numbers, destruction and degradation of its habitat by feral pigs, feral goats, exotic plant species, military exercises, and vandalism. The habitat is prone to erosion and landslides, which can destroy the plants. Slugs and rats damage similar species and may threaten this one.
