= Cyanea crispa =

Conservation status
- Critically Endangered (IUCN 3.1)

Scientific classification
- Kingdom: Plantae
- Clade: Tracheophytes
- Clade: Angiosperms
- Clade: Eudicots
- Clade: Asterids
- Order: Asterales
- Family: Campanulaceae
- Genus: Cyanea
- Species: C. crispa

Binomial name
- Cyanea crispa (Gaudich.) Lammers, Givnish & Sytsma

Synonyms
- Rollandia crispa

Species of flowering plant

Cyanea crispa is a rare species of flowering plant known by the common names crimped rollandia and Koolau Range rollandia. It is endemic to Oahu, where there are no more than fifty individuals remaining in the Koʻolau Range. It is a federally listed endangered species of the United States. Like other Cyanea it is known as haha in Hawaiian.

== Distribution ==
The plant occurs in several types of habitat in the Koʻolau Mountains, including open moist forest and the shady understory of wet forest. The remaining 30 to 50 plants are divided among five populations, but three of the populations have only one plant each. Threats to the species include its small numbers and habitat destruction and degradation by feral pigs, rats, slugs, and exotic plants such as Koster's curse (Clidemia hirta) and thimbleberry (Rubus rosifolius).

== Description ==
This Hawaiian lobelioid is a shrub with a succulent stem topped with a cluster of leaves. The inflorescence contains 3 to 8 red flowers with purple-striped petals. The broad oval leaves are between 12 and 30 inches (30 and 76 cm) long and 3.5 to 6 inches (8.9 to 15.2 cm) wide. The leaves have undulating, smooth or toothed leaf margins. Each leaf is on a stalk where there is also clusters of fuzzy flowers. The calyx lobes are oval or oblong, and often overlap at the base. The petals are pale magenta in color, with darker longitudinal stripes. The berries have many tiny dark seeds.

The plant is being propagated and the seeds collected.
