= Cyanea humboldtiana =

Conservation status
- Critically Imperiled (NatureServe)

Scientific classification
- Kingdom: Plantae
- Clade: Tracheophytes
- Clade: Angiosperms
- Clade: Eudicots
- Clade: Asterids
- Order: Asterales
- Family: Campanulaceae
- Genus: Cyanea
- Species: C. humboldtiana

Binomial name
- Cyanea humboldtiana (Gaudich.) Lammers, Givnish & Sytsma

Synonyms
- Rollandia humboldtiana

Species of flowering plant

Cyanea humboldtiana (formerly Rollandia humboldtiana) is a rare species of flowering plant in the bellflower family known by the common name Oʻahu rollandia. It is native to Oʻahu, where it is known only from the Koʻolau Mountains. It is a federally listed endangered species. Like other Cyanea it is known as haha in Hawaiian.

This Hawaiian lobelioid is a shrub reaching 1 to 2 meters in height. It bears magenta or white flowers. There are no more than 300 individuals remaining. They grow along the southern peaks of the Koʻolau Range in the cloud zone. The species is threatened by exotic plants and feral pigs in its habitat.
