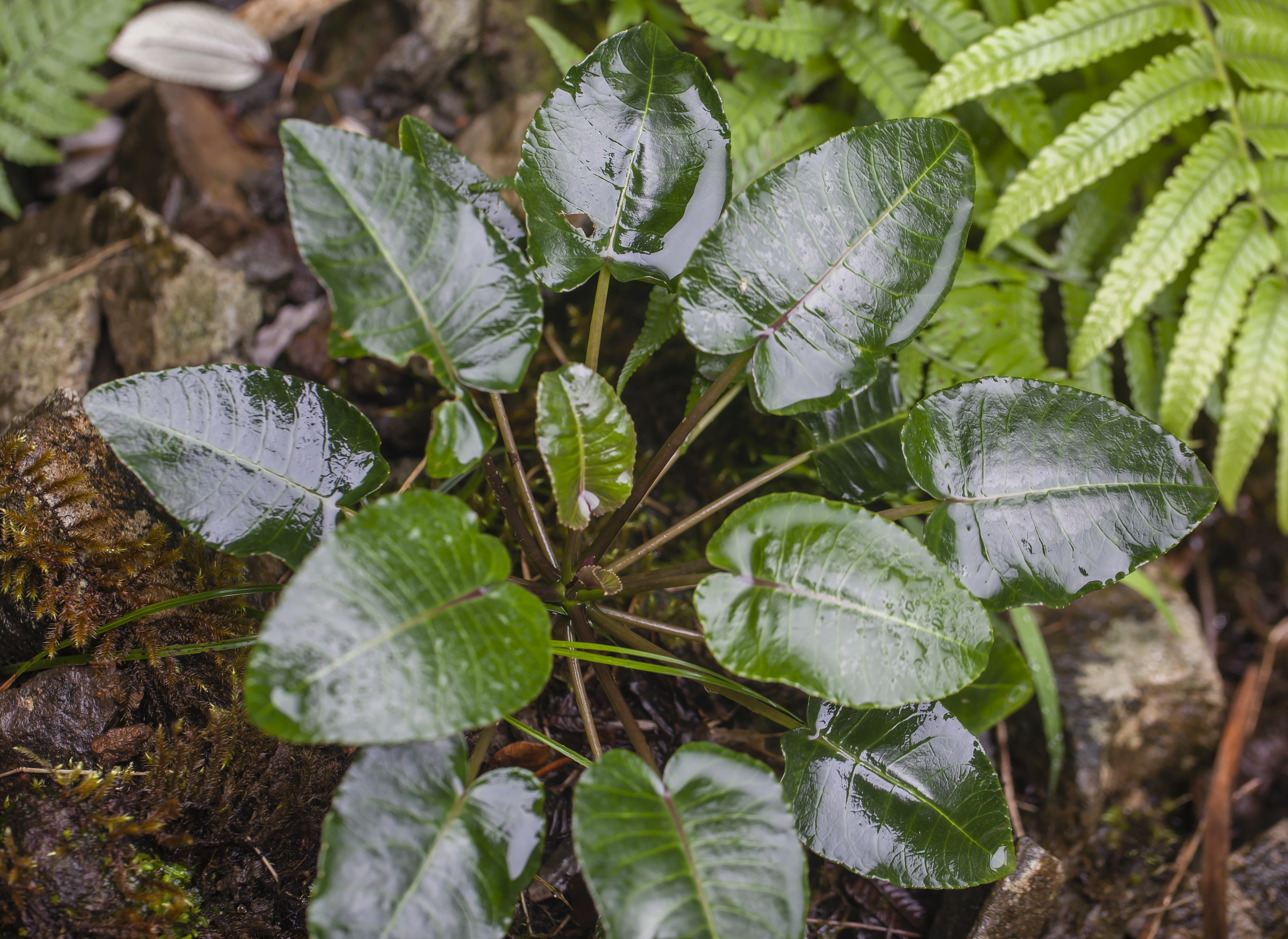

Conservation status
- Critically Endangered (IUCN 3.1)

Scientific classification
- Kingdom: Plantae
- Clade: Tracheophytes
- Clade: Angiosperms
- Clade: Eudicots
- Clade: Asterids
- Order: Asterales
- Family: Campanulaceae
- Genus: Cyanea
- Species: C. asarifolia

Binomial name
- Cyanea asarifolia H.St.John

= Cyanea asarifolia =

Species of flowering plant

Cyanea asarifolia is a rare species of flowering plant in the bellflower family known by the common name gingerleaf cyanea or ʻōhāwai in Hawaiian. It is endemic to Kauaʻi, where there were no more than 30 individuals in a single population as of 2005. It is a federally listed endangered species of the United States. Like other Cyanea it is often known as haha in Hawaiʻi.

This Hawaiian lobelioid is a small, short-lived shrub. The leaves are heart-shaped and the inflorescence bears up to 40 flowers which are white with purple stripes.

The plant was discovered in 1970 and described as a new species in 1975. The first known population was composed of five or six plants and it is thought to have been extirpated. Another population containing 14 adult plants and five juveniles was found, but it was soon heavily damaged by Hurricane Iniki. Only a few seedlings survived. Today the only known population contains 20 to 30 plants, but some of these appear to be reproducing. Some plants have been propagated in a greenhouse and then planted in appropriate habitat, but these individuals were destroyed in a landslide.

Threats to the remaining population include natural events such as landslides, which could conceivably cause extinction. The gene pool is small. Plants are threatened by slugs, rats, mice, feral pigs, and exotic plants.
