= Cyanea calycina =

Conservation status
- Critically Endangered (IUCN 3.1)

Scientific classification
- Kingdom: Plantae
- Clade: Tracheophytes
- Clade: Angiosperms
- Clade: Eudicots
- Clade: Asterids
- Order: Asterales
- Family: Campanulaceae
- Genus: Cyanea
- Species: C. calycina

Binomial name
- Cyanea calycina (Cham.) Lammers (1998)

Synonyms
- Cyanea lanceolata subsp. calycina (Cham.) Lammers, Givnish & Sytsma (1993); Delissea calycina (Cham.) C.Presl (1836); Lobelia calycina Cham. (1833); Rollandia calycina (Cham.) G.Don (1834); Rollandia lanceolata subsp. calycina (Cham.) Lammers (1988)

Species of plant

Cyanea calycina is a flowering plant in the Campanulaceae family. The IUCN has classified the species as critically endangered. It is native to the Hawaiian Islands. An example is being monitored with a plant cam.

== Description ==
It is a flowering perennial shrub from 1 to 3 meters tall.

== Taxonomy ==
Flowering plant species first discovered by Ludolf Karl Adelbert von Chamisso, and described by Lammers in The Leipzig catalogue of vascular plants, in 2020.
