= Cyanea kolekoleensis =

Conservation status
- Critically endangered, possibly extinct (IUCN 3.1)

- Critically Imperiled (NatureServe)

Scientific classification
- Kingdom: Plantae
- Clade: Tracheophytes
- Clade: Angiosperms
- Clade: Eudicots
- Clade: Asterids
- Order: Asterales
- Family: Campanulaceae
- Genus: Cyanea
- Species: C. kolekoleensis

Binomial name
- Cyanea kolekoleensis (H.St.John) Lammers

Synonyms
- Delissea kolekoleensis

Species of flowering plant

Cyanea kolekoleensis (formerly Delissea kolekoleensis) is a rare species of flowering plant in the bellflower family known by the common names `Oha and Kolekole cyanea. It is endemic to Kauai where it has only been seen in the Wahiawa Mountains. Like other Cyanea it is known as haha in Hawaiian.

This Hawaiian lobelioid was discovered in 1987 and it has not been seen since 1992. Because more specimens are likely to be found in parts of the dense rainforest that have not been surveyed, it is not considered extinct. It was federally listed as an endangered species of the United States in 2010.

This is a shrub reaching 1.9 meters in maximum height. It bears purple-tinged white flowers. The plant is threatened by damage to its habitat caused by feral pigs and exotic plants.
