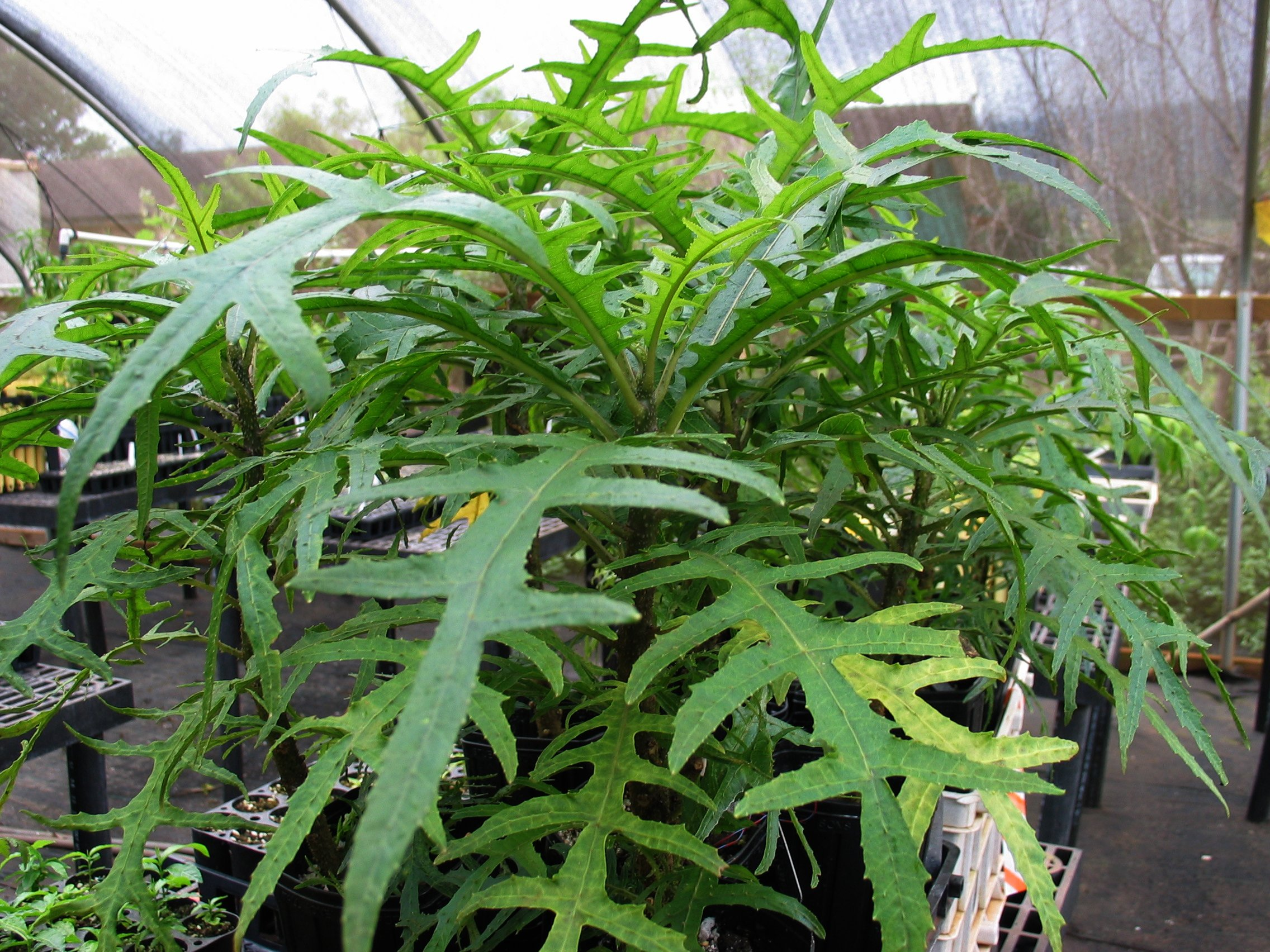
- Propagated specimens of ssp. obatae
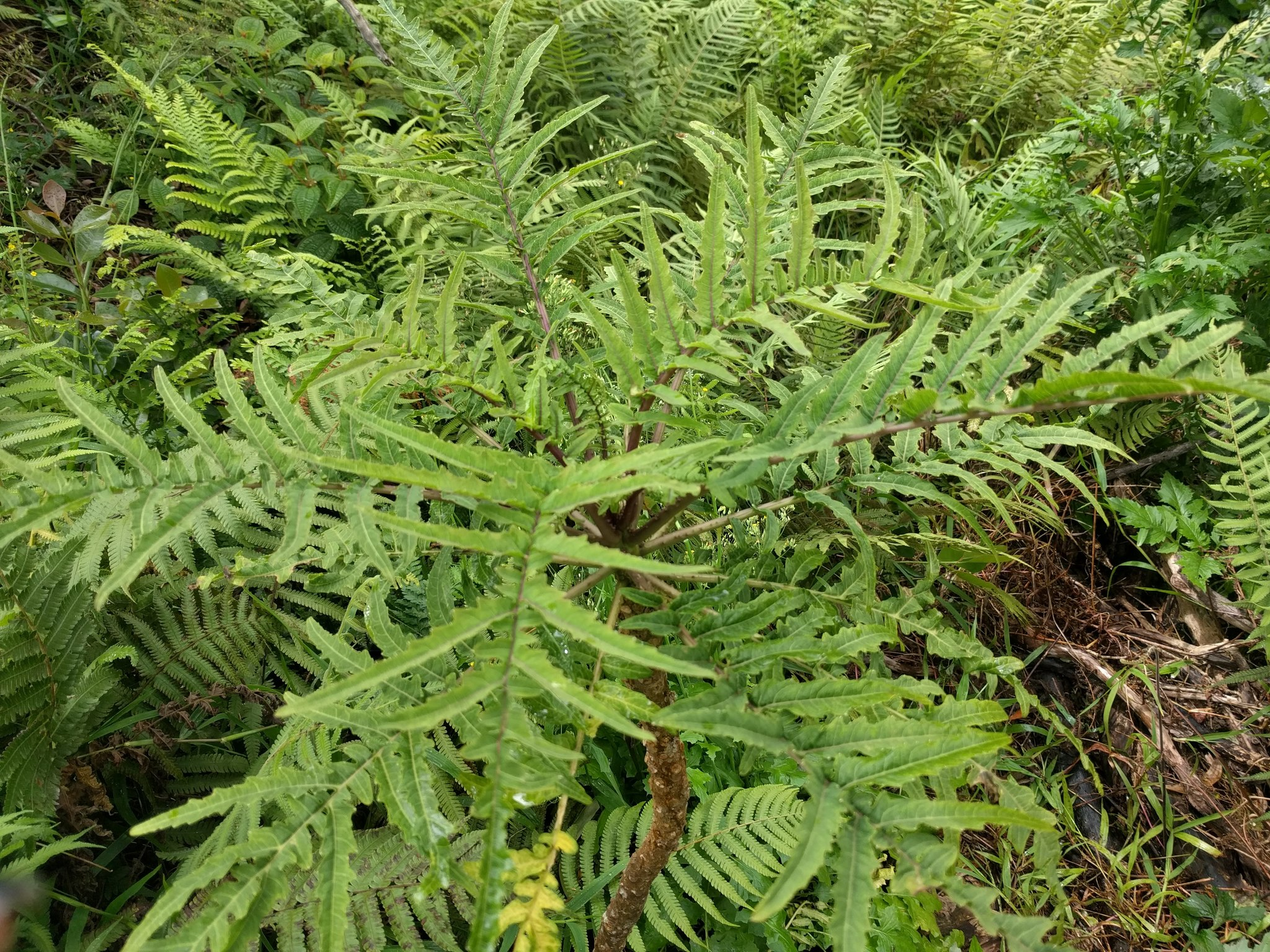
- Wild specimen of ssp. obatae

Conservation status
- Critically Endangered (IUCN 3.1)

- Critically Imperiled (NatureServe)

Scientific classification
- Kingdom: Plantae
- Clade: Embryophytes
- Clade: Tracheophytes
- Clade: Angiosperms
- Clade: Eudicots
- Clade: Asterids
- Order: Asterales
- Family: Campanulaceae
- Genus: Cyanea
- Species: C. grimesiana

Binomial name
- Cyanea grimesiana Gaudich.

= Cyanea grimesiana =

Species of flowering plant

Cyanea grimesiana is a rare species of flowering plant in the bellflower family known by the common name splitleaf cyanea. It is native to Oahu and Molokai, where it is known from 12 occurrences. It is a federally listed endangered species. Like other Cyanea it is known as haha in Hawaiian.

== Species classification ==
This is generally considered a species complex made up of at least three subtaxa. One, var. cylindrocalyx (sometimes treated as a separate species called C. cylindrocalyx), is thought to be extinct. The other two are divided into twelve occurrences on two islands, for a total of fewer than 50 plants.

== Location ==
The ssp. grimesiana was formerly found on Oahu and Molokai, but has not been observed on Molokai since 1991, while ssp. obatae is limited to the Waianae Mountains of Oahu. The latter subspecies may only be composed of five individual plants today, and all are located on private, unprotected land.

== Characteristics ==
This Hawaiian lobelioid is a shrub which can exceed three metres (9.8 ft) in height. The stem and herbage are prickly. The tubular flowers are up to 8 centimetres (3.1 in) long and may be purple, green, or yellow with reddish stripes. The fruit is an orange berry.
