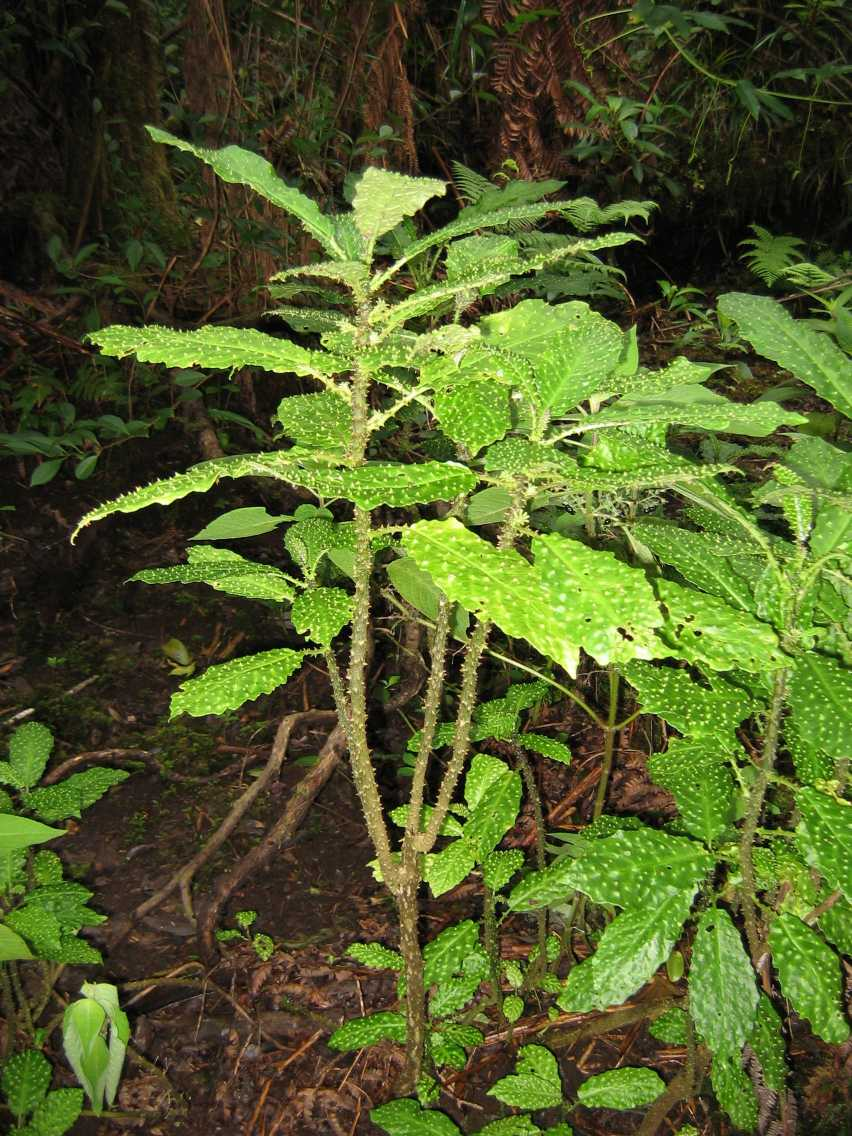

Conservation status
- Critically Imperiled (NatureServe)

Scientific classification
- Kingdom: Plantae
- Clade: Tracheophytes
- Clade: Angiosperms
- Clade: Eudicots
- Clade: Asterids
- Order: Asterales
- Family: Campanulaceae
- Genus: Cyanea
- Species: C. platyphylla

Binomial name
- Cyanea platyphylla (A.Gray) Hillebr.

= Cyanea platyphylla =

Species of plant

Cyanea platyphylla is a rare species of flowering plant in the bellflower family known by the common names puna cyanea and flatleaf cyanea. It is endemic to the island of Hawaii, where there are fewer than 100 plants remaining in the wild. It is a federally listed endangered species. Like other Cyanea it is known as haha in Hawaiian.

This Hawaiian lobelioid is a shrub reaching 3 meters in maximum height. It bears white, red, or red-striped yellowish flowers.

The plant grows in wet forests, including those on the eastern slopes of Mauna Loa, Mauna Kea, and Kīlauea. It is threatened by degradation of its habitat by feral pigs, cattle, and exotic plant species.
