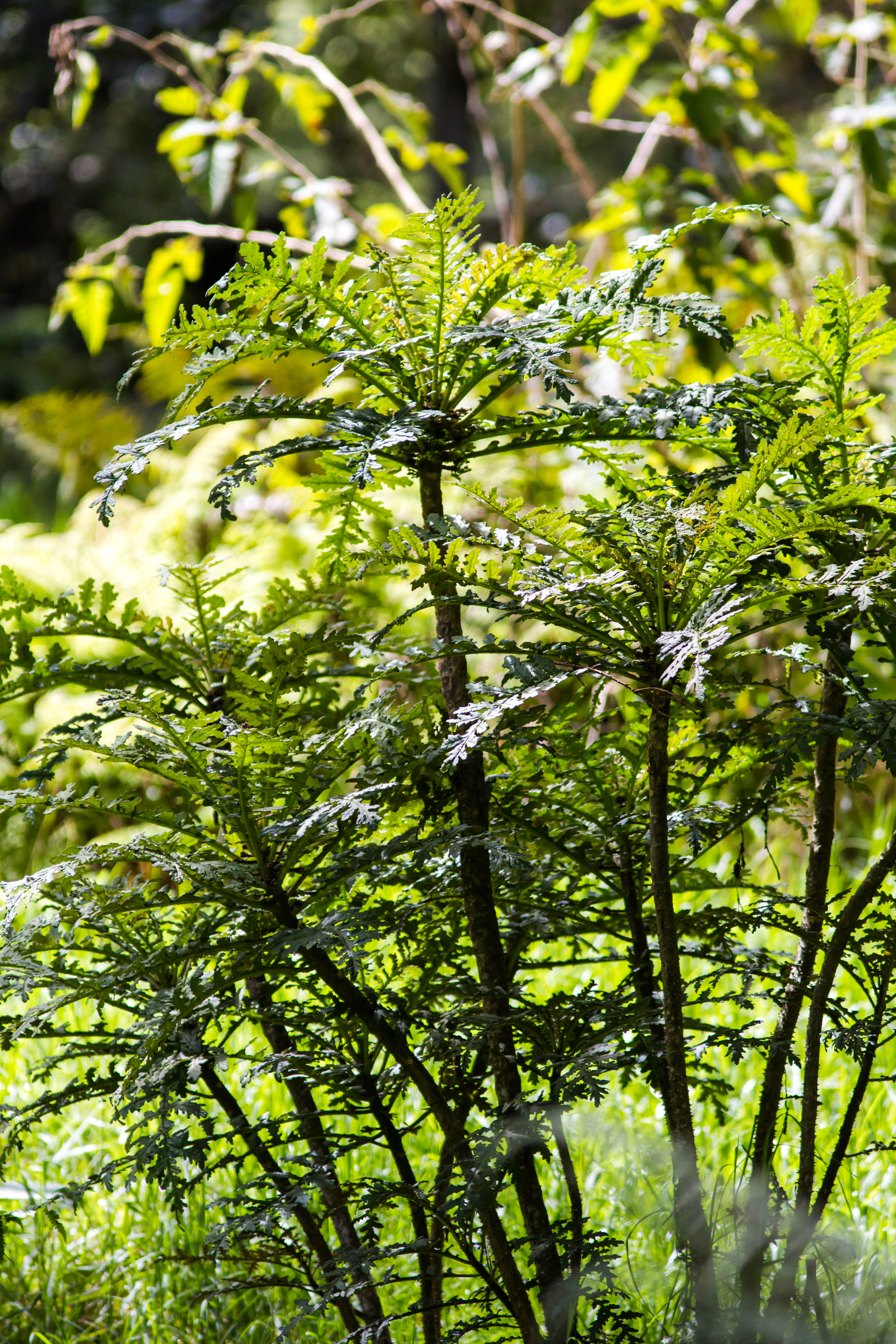

Conservation status
- Critically Imperiled (NatureServe)

Scientific classification
- Kingdom: Plantae
- Clade: Tracheophytes
- Clade: Angiosperms
- Clade: Eudicots
- Clade: Asterids
- Order: Asterales
- Family: Campanulaceae
- Genus: Cyanea
- Species: C. shipmanii

Binomial name
- Cyanea shipmanii Rock

= Cyanea shipmanii =

Species of flowering plant

Cyanea shipmanii is a rare species of flowering plant in the bellflower family known by the common name Shipman's cyanea. It is endemic to the island of Hawaii, where it is known only from the windward slopes of Mauna Loa and Mauna Kea. It is a federally listed endangered species of the United States. Like other Cyanea, it is known as haha in Hawaiian.

New populations of this species, usually consisting of only a handful of individuals each, are still rarely found in the wild at widely scattered locations in windward native forests, at around 5000–6000 feet elevation. There has been widespread outplanting of hundreds of nursery-raised C. shipmanii in recent years, but the genetic diversity of these outplantings is very low due to the small number of original wild plants they are descended from. It is not clear whether any of these recent outplantings will lead to self-sustaining wild populations. Only 37% of C. shipmanii seedlings have survived when planted in habitat.

This Hawaiian lobelioid is a fragile sparingly branched shrub which can reach four meters in height. The leaves are deeply divided and subdivided with many tiny lobes, resembling the fronds of ferns. The leaves and stems of young plants and the lower parts of larger plants are encrusted with weak thornlike bristles, as with many other Cyanea species. The inflorescence bears many greenish white flowers, producing clusters of small orange fruits each bearing many small seeds. The natural habitat of the plant is moist native forests on well-developed volcanic soils. The plant has been driven toward extinction by degradation of its habitat by logging, cattle ranching, exotic plant species and feral pigs.
