= Cyanea gibsonii =

Conservation status
- Critically Endangered (IUCN 3.1)

Scientific classification
- Kingdom: Plantae
- Clade: Tracheophytes
- Clade: Angiosperms
- Clade: Eudicots
- Clade: Asterids
- Order: Asterales
- Family: Campanulaceae
- Genus: Cyanea
- Species: C. gibsonii

Binomial name
- Cyanea gibsonii Hillebr.

Species of flowering plant

Cyanea gibsonii is a species of flowering plant in the family Campanulaceae that was first described by William Hillebrand. It is endemic to the island of Lanai, Hawaii, United States.

== Status ==
Cyanea gibsonii is listed as critically endangered by the IUCN. The population is fragmented into eight subpopulations, with a total of between 75 and 80 individuals. Grazing by deer, rats and invertebrates has contributed to the decline in the number of individuals. In addition, this species is outcompeted by invasive species.
