= Cyanea mceldowneyi =

Conservation status
- Critically Imperiled (NatureServe)

Scientific classification
- Kingdom: Plantae
- Clade: Tracheophytes
- Clade: Angiosperms
- Clade: Eudicots
- Clade: Asterids
- Order: Asterales
- Family: Campanulaceae
- Genus: Cyanea
- Species: C. mceldowneyi

Binomial name
- Cyanea mceldowneyi Rock

Species of flowering plant

Cyanea mceldowneyi is a rare species of flowering plant in the bellflower family known by the common name McEldowney cyanea. It is endemic to Hawaii, where it is known only from the island of Maui. A 2007 count estimated 60 plants remaining in two populations. It was federally listed as an endangered species of the United States in 1992. Like other Cyanea it is known as haha in Hawaiian.

This Hawaiian lobelioid is a shrub growing 2 to 3 meters tall. The leaves are up to 35 centimeters long by 9 wide and are lined with hard teeth. The leaves are prickly, especially when new. The inflorescence bears 5 to 7 tubular flowers. The petals are white with purple stripes and have prickles.

This species is threatened by habitat degradation due to feral pigs and exotic plant species such as Koster's curse (Clidemia hirta), glorybush (Tibouchina herbacea), and thimbleberry (Rubus rosifolius). It may also suffer from the lack of pollinators.

This plant was named for a Maui forester named George McEldowney.
