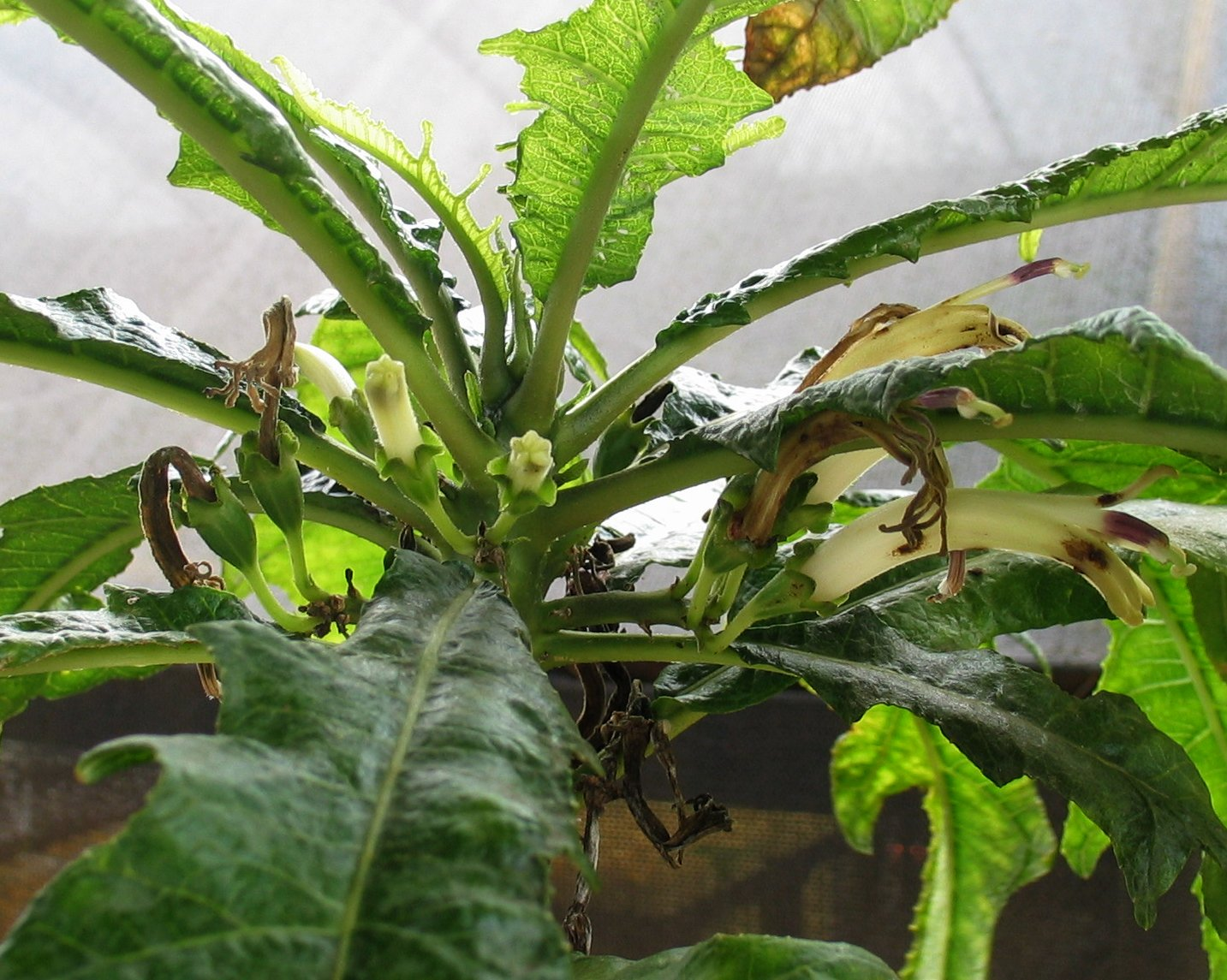

Conservation status
- Extinct in the Wild (IUCN 3.1)

Scientific classification
- Kingdom: Plantae
- Clade: Tracheophytes
- Clade: Angiosperms
- Clade: Eudicots
- Clade: Asterids
- Order: Asterales
- Family: Campanulaceae
- Genus: Cyanea
- Species: C. pinnatifida

Binomial name
- Cyanea pinnatifida (Cham.) E.Wimm.

= Cyanea pinnatifida =

Species of flowering plant

Cyanea pinnatifida is a rare species of flowering plant in the bellflower family known by the common name sharktail cyanea. It is endemic to Oahu, but it is now extinct in the wild and only exists in cultivation. Like other Cyanea it is known as haha in Hawaiian.

== Description ==
This Hawaiian lobelioid is a shrub which can reach ten feet (3.0 m) in height. The leaves are divided into a few deep lobes. The inflorescence produces up to 15 green-tinged white flowers with purple stripes. Little is known about the life history of the plant because so few individuals have been known to science.

== Conservation ==
At the time this plant was federally listed as an endangered species in 1991 there was only one individual left. It grew in the Waianae Mountains of Oahu until 2001, when it died. Now some plants are kept at the Lyon Arboretum in Honolulu and a few juveniles have been planted in appropriate habitat. No recruitment has occurred among these, however, and the plant is still considered extinct in the wild. The plant was said to be driven to extinction by the destruction and degradation of its habitat by several forces. The most destructive was the feral pig. Others included exotic plant species, such as Koster's curse (Clidemia hirta) and passionflower (Passiflora suberosa). Rats and slugs, which are very damaging to many Cyanea species, may have affected this one as well.
