= Cyanea quercifolia =

Conservation status
- Extinct (IUCN 2.3)

- Possibly Extinct (NatureServe)

Scientific classification
- Kingdom: Plantae
- Clade: Tracheophytes
- Clade: Angiosperms
- Clade: Eudicots
- Clade: Asterids
- Order: Asterales
- Family: Campanulaceae
- Genus: Cyanea
- Species: †C. quercifolia

Binomial name
- †Cyanea quercifolia (Hillebr.) F.Wimmer

Extinct species of flowering plant

Cyanea quercifolia, known as oakleaf cyanea, was a species of plant native to the Hawaiian island of Maui. The plant is now considered extinct, as its native habitat has been mostly destroyed, and no new individuals have been found.
