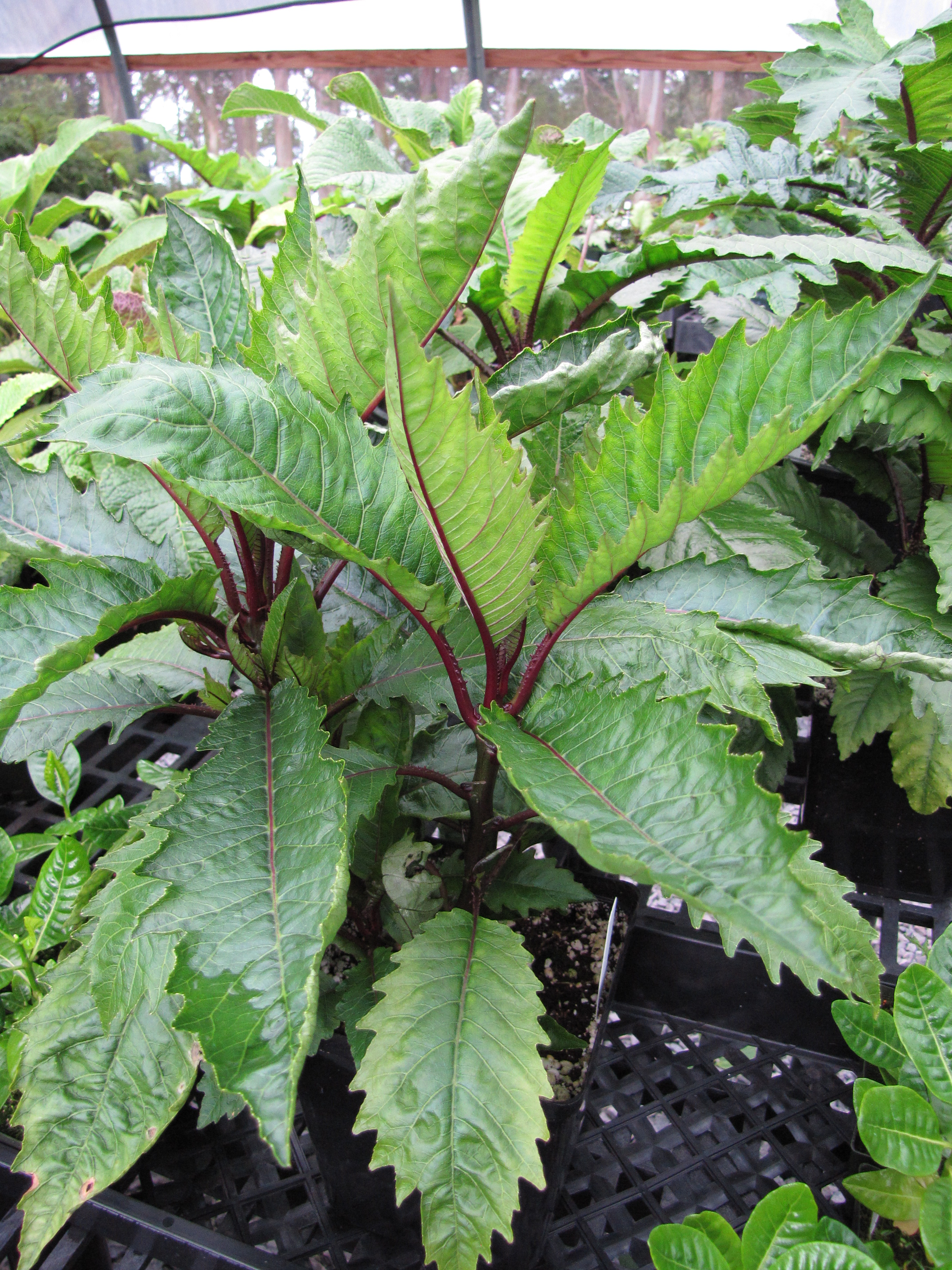
- Propagated plants at the Olinda Rare Plant Facility
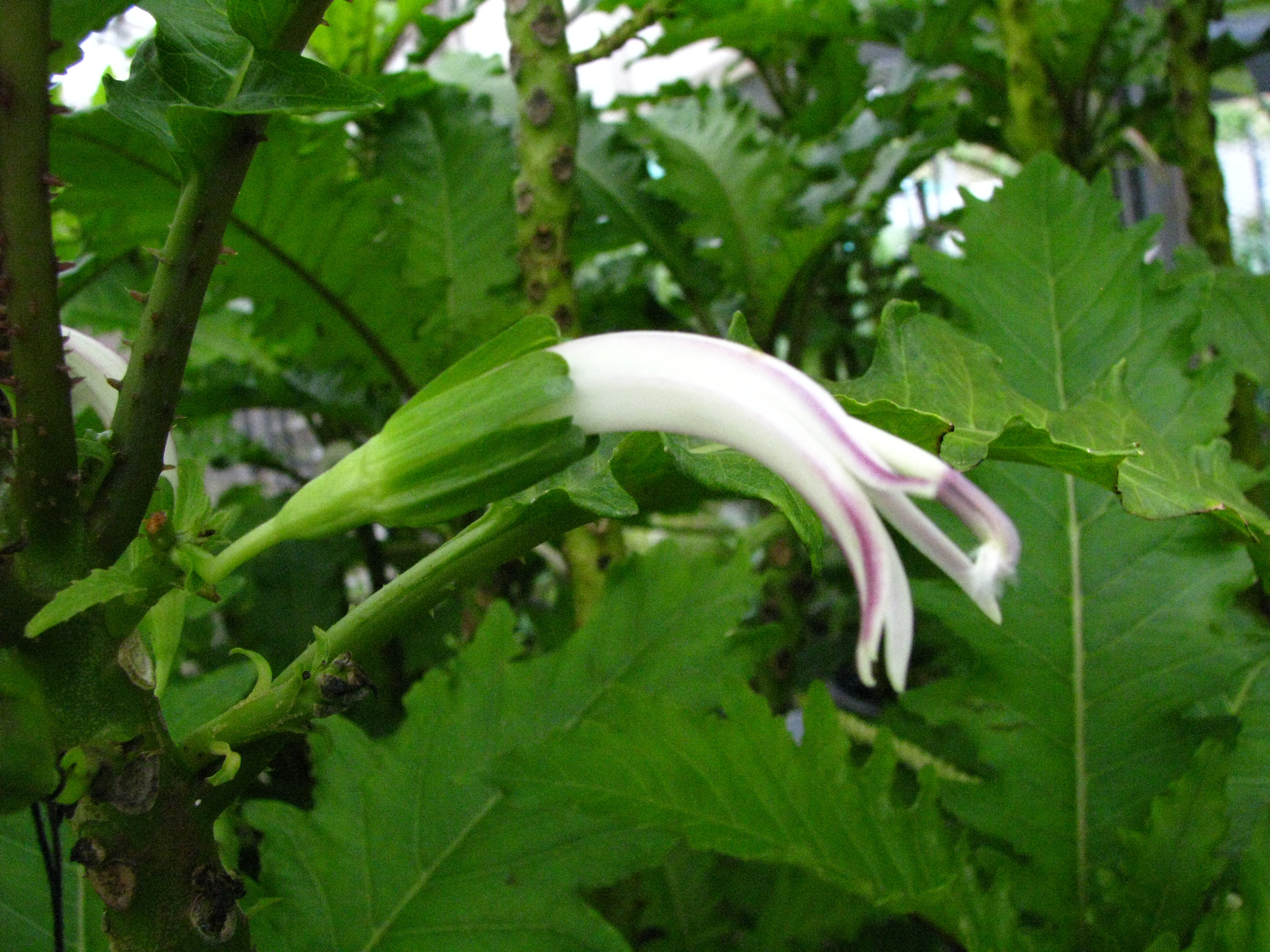
- C. lobata flower

Conservation status
- Critically Endangered (IUCN 3.1)

- Critically Imperiled (NatureServe)

Scientific classification
- Kingdom: Plantae
- Clade: Embryophytes
- Clade: Tracheophytes
- Clade: Angiosperms
- Clade: Eudicots
- Clade: Asterids
- Order: Asterales
- Family: Campanulaceae
- Genus: Cyanea
- Species: C. lobata

Binomial name
- Cyanea lobata H.Mann

Synonyms
- Delissea lobata (H.Mann) H.St.John

= Cyanea lobata =

Species of flowering plant

Cyanea lobata is a rare species of flowering plant in the bellflower family, Campanulaceae. It is known by the common name Waihee Valley cyanea. It is endemic to Hawaii, where it is known from Lanai and Maui. It is a federally listed endangered species. Like other Cyanea it is known as "hāhā" in Hawaiian.

This Hawaiian lobelioid is a shrub which may exceed 2 m (6.6 ft) in height. The stem may have branches. The inflorescence bears greenish or purplish flowers.

There are two subspecies of this plant, both very rare. One individual of ssp. lobata was found in Maui in 1982 after several decades of no observations. This plant was later killed in a landslide. In 1996 three more individuals were found. The ssp. baldwinii had not been seen since 1934 when two plants were discovered on Lanai in 2006. These are being carefully watched.

The five plants remaining of this species are threatened by the destruction and degradation of their wet and moist forest habitat. The Lanai subspecies is found in an understory where the ground is 80% covered by ferns.
