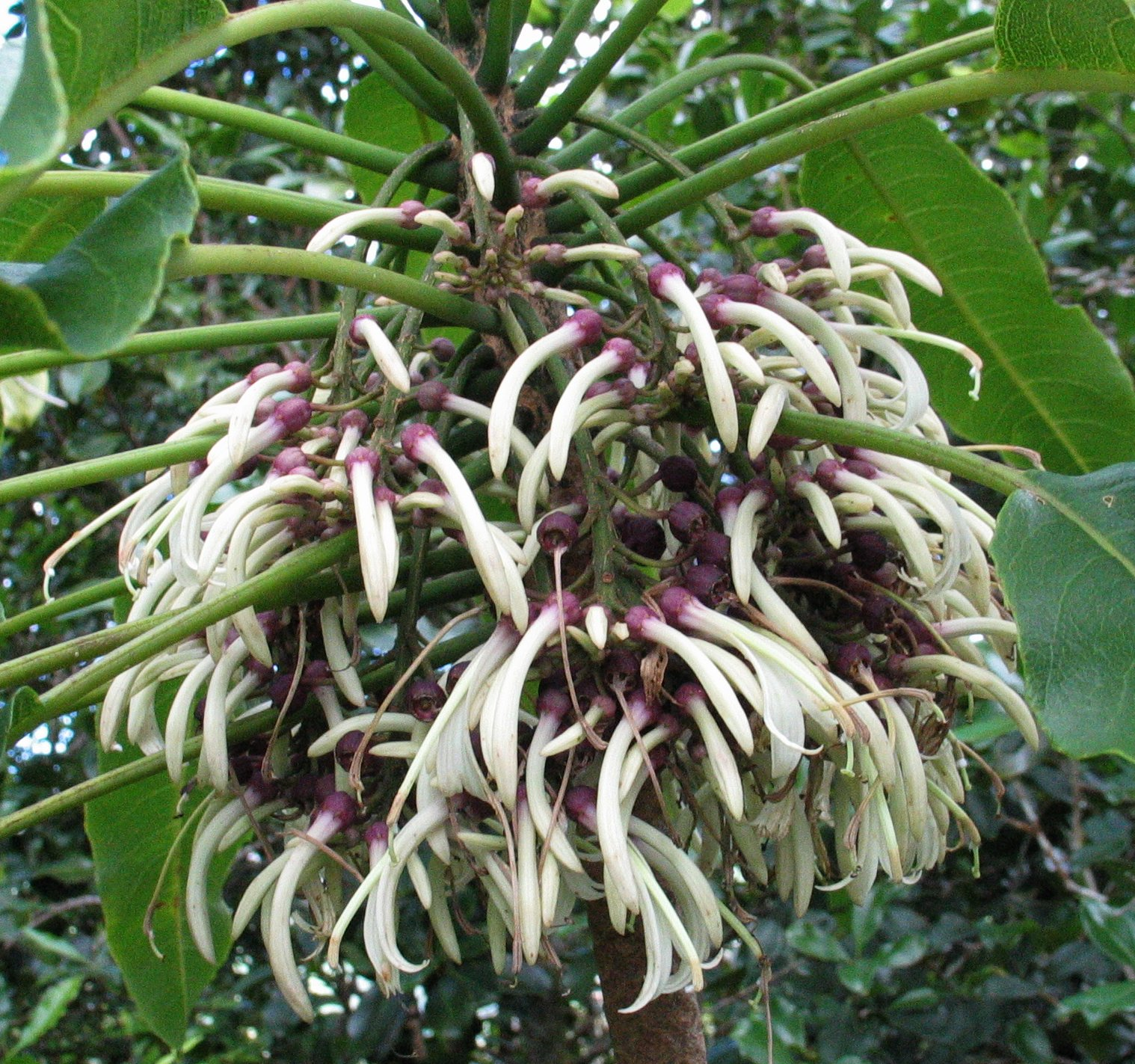

Conservation status
- Imperiled (NatureServe)

Scientific classification
- Kingdom: Plantae
- Clade: Tracheophytes
- Clade: Angiosperms
- Clade: Eudicots
- Clade: Asterids
- Order: Asterales
- Family: Campanulaceae
- Genus: Cyanea
- Species: C. angustifolia

Binomial name
- Cyanea angustifolia (Cham.) Hillebr.

Synonyms
- Lobelia angustifolia Cham. Delissea angustifolia (Cham.) C.Presl Delissea honolulensis Wawra

= Cyanea angustifolia =

Species of flowering plant

Cyanea angustifolia is a shrub in the genus Cyanea that is endemic to Hawaiʻi. In Hawaiʻi, it is referred to as ʻAku as well as Hāhā, which is the term for the generalized Cyanea genus. C. angustifolia was a food source during times of food scarcity for the Hawaiians. This shrub is characterized by specialized flower shapes and it is found at higher elevations in wet environments.

== Description ==
This shrub has a mature size of 2-3 meters wide, reaching heights of over 3 meters tall. It has coarse. glabrous leaves that have transparent veinlets.

The flowers are arranged as hanging clusters and are typically purple, pink, or white. They are characterized by their fused anther and filament which produces a tube around the style and stigma. Pollen is released by the anthers into the fused tube. There are stiff, short hairs at the tips of the anthers that aid in the collection of pollen and allow for pollinators to easily collect and spread the pollen. The flowers eventually mature into a globose purple berry and bloom sporadically all year round.

== Distribution and habitat ==
C. angustifolia can be found on Oʻahu, commonly in the Ko’olau Mountains and scarcely in the Wai’anae Range. It can also be found on eastern Molokaʻi and Lānaʻi. Additionally, they can be found in northern areas of West Maui. Wet conditions are preferred for the survival of C.angustifolia. This plant's preferred habitat elevation ranges from 45 meters to over 760 meters, growing in mesic forests, mesic valleys, and wet forests.

== Etymology ==
Cyanea derives from the Greek and Latin words for blue and violet. Angustifolia translates to narrow leaves. Closely related species include Cyanea angustifolia var. racemosa, Lobelia angustifolia, Delissea acuminata var. Angustifolia, Delissea angustifolia, Delissea angustifolia var. racemosa, and Delissea honolulensis.

== Human use and cultural significance ==
Culturally, C. angustifolia has been important to Native Hawaiian island populations. Hawaiians would eat the leaves of this plant when food was scarce, wrapping the Hāhā leaves in ti leaves and then cooking them in an .imu'.

In more modern times, this plant is ornamental when found outside of its typical environment and can be kept indoors as a house plant.

== Conservation status ==
Like most endemic species, C. angustifolia is threatened by invasive species and is listed as imperiled, with fewer than 10,000 individuals estimated in the wild. Its range is limited to mostly mesic and mesic-wet forests. Threats include habitat loss and damage from invasive pests. Notably, C. angustifolia is susceptible to pests such as slugs and snails who often end up girdling the plant in just a single night.

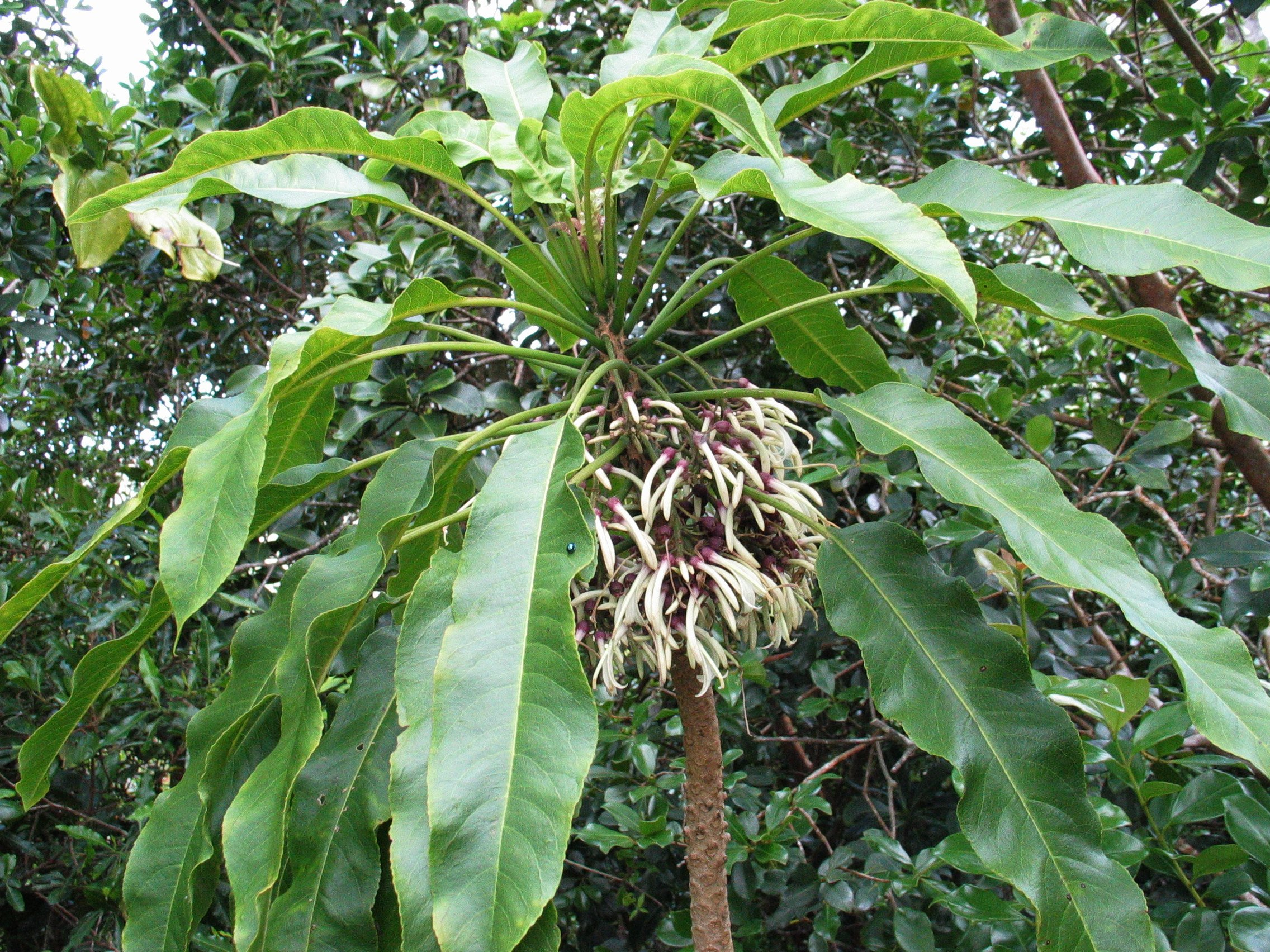
Cyanea angustifolia, known as Hāhā in Hawaii. It is endemic to the Hawaiian Islands. Photographed on the Waiʻanae-Kai Trail, Waiʻanae Mountains, Oʻahu
