= Cyanea copelandii =

Conservation status
- Endangered (IUCN 3.1)

Scientific classification
- Kingdom: Plantae
- Clade: Tracheophytes
- Clade: Angiosperms
- Clade: Eudicots
- Clade: Asterids
- Order: Asterales
- Family: Campanulaceae
- Genus: Cyanea
- Species: C. copelandii

Binomial name
- Cyanea copelandii Rock

Species of flowering plant

Cyanea copelandii is a rare species of flowering plant in the bellflower family known by the common name treetrunk cyanea. It is endemic to Maui, where there are no more than 250 individuals remaining in the wild. It is a federally listed endangered species of the United States. Like other Cyanea it is known as hāhā in Hawaiian.

There are two subspecies of this plant, but one, ssp. copelandii, is thought to be extinct. It was native to the island of Hawaii, where it was driven to extinction by feral ungulates such as pigs. The plant was probably also pollinated by Hawaiian honeycreepers, many of which are also extinct.

The remaining subspecies, ssp. haleakalaensis, has been reduced to a population under 250 by habitat degradation caused by exotic plants and feral non-native animals. The population is divided into three subpopulations. They are shrinking by 25% each generation.

This Hawaiian lobelioid is a short-lived shrub which grows as a vine. It occurs in wet and moist forests.
