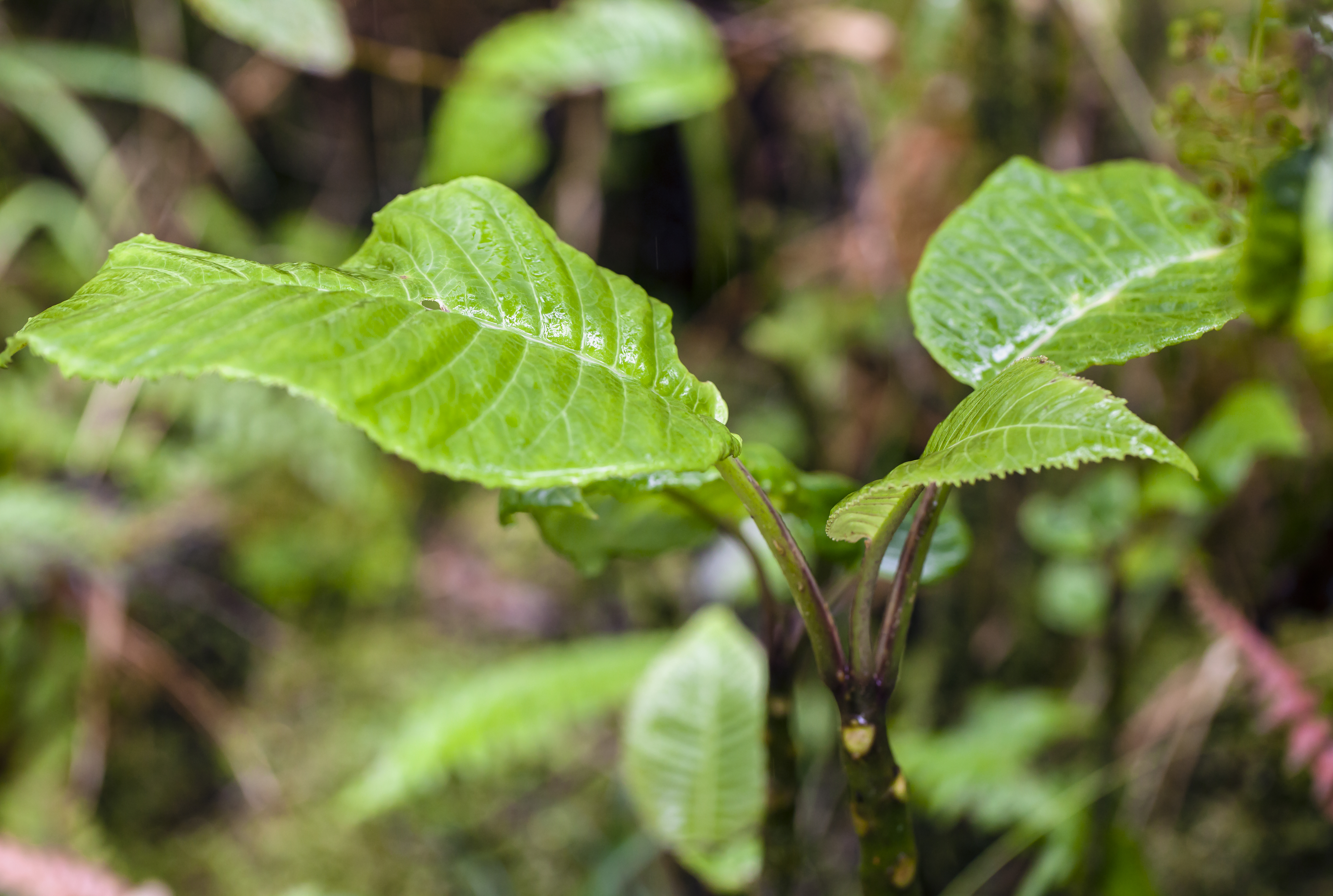

Conservation status
- Critically Imperiled (NatureServe)

Scientific classification
- Kingdom: Plantae
- Clade: Tracheophytes
- Clade: Angiosperms
- Clade: Eudicots
- Clade: Asterids
- Order: Asterales
- Family: Campanulaceae
- Genus: Cyanea
- Species: C. remyi

Binomial name
- Cyanea remyi Rock

= Cyanea remyi =

Species of flowering plant

Cyanea remyi is a rare species of flowering plant in the bellflower family known by the common name Remy's cyanea. It is endemic to Hawaii, where it is known only from the island of Kauai. It is a federally listed endangered species of the United States. Like other Cyanea, it is known as haha in Hawaiian.

This plant was very poorly known before 1987, with only two specimens ever having been collected, and no more occurrences of the plant seen since 1916. Then, in 1987, the species was rediscovered when a population of up to 50 plants was found next to the Wailua River. This population was decimated by Hurricane Iniki in 1992, leaving few plants alive. In 2000, eight plants were observed, and in 2006 only a single individual remained. In the meantime other small populations were found, but several have since been destroyed in events such as flash floods. A 2010 report estimated as few as 24 individuals divided among three populations.

This Hawaiian lobelioid is a shrub growing up to 2 meters tall and appearing superficially palm-like. The inflorescence bears up to 13 deep purple flowers. It grows in wet forest habitat in the understory of ʻōhiʻa lehua (Metrosideros polymorpha), ohe mauka (Tetraplasandra spp.), and ʻōlapa (Cheirodendron spp.). The understory is thick with ferns, other Cyanea species, and many other species of Hawaiian endemic flora.

The habitat is threatened with degradation and destruction by a number of forces, especially feral pigs and exotic plant species such as Chinese ground orchid (Phaius tankervilleae) and Koster's curse (Clidemia hirta).
