= Cyanea glabra =

Conservation status
- Critically Endangered (IUCN 3.1)

Scientific classification
- Kingdom: Plantae
- Clade: Tracheophytes
- Clade: Angiosperms
- Clade: Eudicots
- Clade: Asterids
- Order: Asterales
- Family: Campanulaceae
- Genus: Cyanea
- Species: C. glabra

Binomial name
- Cyanea glabra (E.Wimm.) H.St.John

Species of flowering plant

Cyanea glabra is a rare species of flowering plant in the family Campanulaceae known by the common name smooth cyanea. It is endemic to Maui, where there are twelve plants remaining in the wild. It was federally listed as an endangered species of the United States with nine other Maui Nui endemics in 1999. Like other Cyanea it is known as haha in Hawaiian.

This Hawaiian lobelioid is a branching shrub that reaches an uncertain height. It grows in wet forests dominated by Acacia koa and/or Metrosideros polymorpha at 975 to 1,340 m (3,200 to 4,400 ft). Associated plants include Cheirodendron trigynum, Tetraplasandra hawaiensis, Xylosma hawaiensis, Pipturus albidus, Coprosma spp., Wikstroemia oahuensis, Clermontia kakeana, Psychotria spp., Sadleria spp., Cyrtandra spathulata, Touchardia latifolia, Freycinetia arborea, and Cyanea elliptica. The remaining 12 plants are part of one population divided into two subpopulations. Threats to the species include exotic plants, feral pigs, and landslides.
