= Cyanea dolichopoda =

Conservation status
- Extinct (IUCN 3.1)

Scientific classification
- Kingdom: Plantae
- Clade: Tracheophytes
- Clade: Angiosperms
- Clade: Eudicots
- Clade: Asterids
- Order: Asterales
- Family: Campanulaceae
- Genus: Cyanea
- Species: †C. dolichopoda

Binomial name
- †Cyanea dolichopoda Lammers & Lorence

Extinct species of flowering plant

Cyanea dolichopoda was a species of shrub in the bellflower family known by the common name long-foot cyanea that was endemic to Kauaʻi. It was discovered in 1990 and has not been located in the wild since 1992. Like other Cyanea it is known as haha in Hawaiian.

This Hawaiian lobelioid was discovered in the Blue Hole, a valley on Kauai near the Wailua River. The Blue Hole is deep, nearly surrounded by steep cliffs up to 900 metres (3,000 ft) tall, and wet, a very high rainfall area filled with waterfalls. Only four plants were ever found, three juvenile specimens and one plant just reaching flowering stage. Because the plant was so obviously an unknown species and was apparently on the brink of extinction, it was given a name. It was not seen again after 1992.

The IUCN has declared the species extinct. The habitat is steep and hard to access. Because it is "very likely" that more specimens of the plant will be found in future surveys, the species was added to the endangered species list of the United States in 2010.
