= Cyanea marksii =

Conservation status
- Critically Imperiled (NatureServe)

Scientific classification
- Kingdom: Plantae
- Clade: Tracheophytes
- Clade: Angiosperms
- Clade: Eudicots
- Clade: Asterids
- Order: Asterales
- Family: Campanulaceae
- Genus: Cyanea
- Species: C. marksii

Binomial name
- Cyanea marksii Rock

Species of plant

Cyanea marksii, or Marks' cyanea, is a tree in the bellflower family. It is critically endangered or extinct. The last certain sighting of the species was in 1970.

== Distribution ==
It is native to North America and was found on Hawaii.

== Taxonomy ==
It was named by Joseph Rock in Occas. Pap. Bernice Pauahi Bishop Mus. 22: 52 in 1957.
