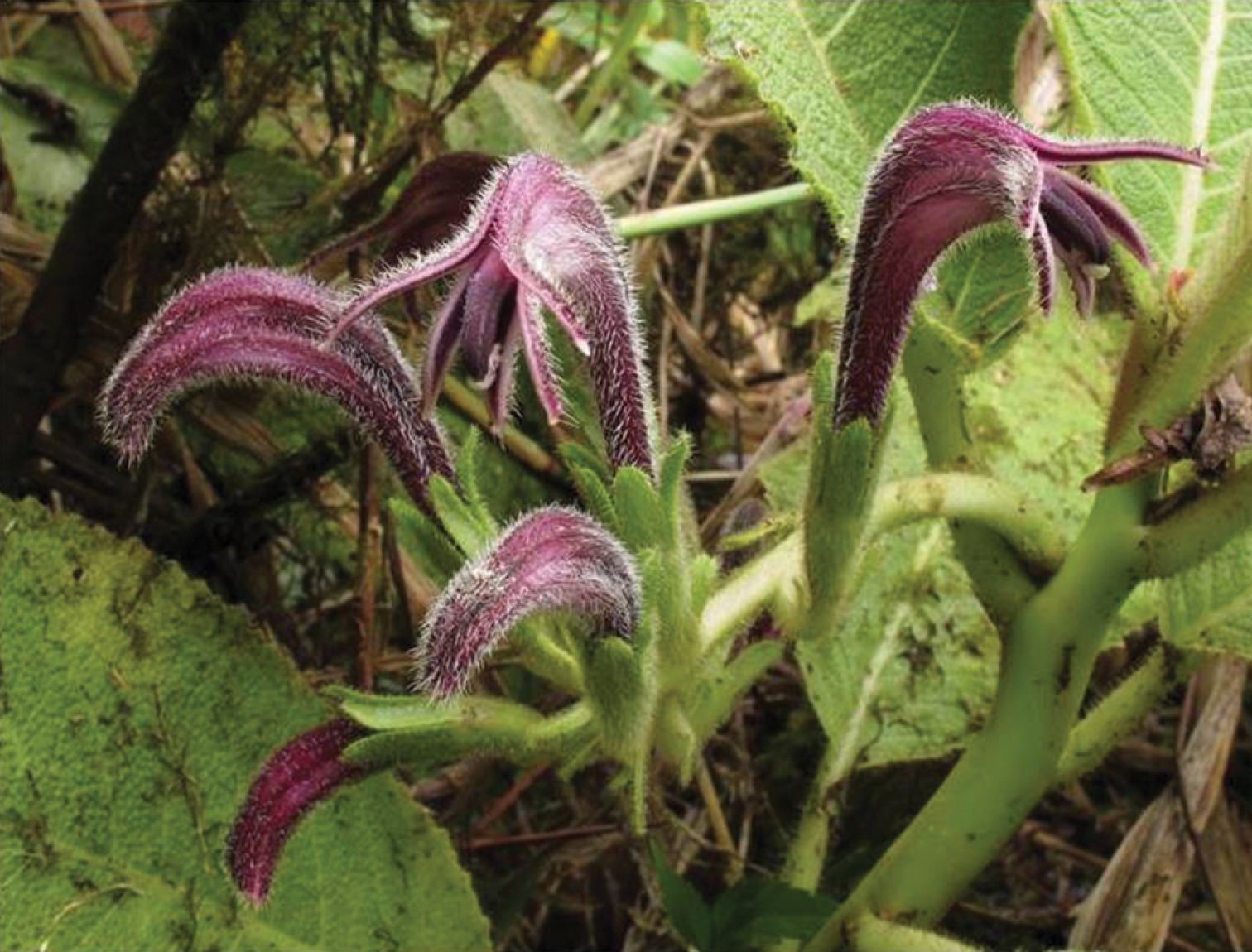
- Flowers of Cyanea konahuanuiensis

Conservation status
- Critically Endangered (IUCN 3.1)

Scientific classification
- Kingdom: Plantae
- Clade: Embryophytes
- Clade: Tracheophytes
- Clade: Spermatophytes
- Clade: Angiosperms
- Clade: Eudicots
- Clade: Asterids
- Order: Asterales
- Family: Campanulaceae
- Genus: Cyanea
- Species: C. konahuanuiensis

Binomial name
- Cyanea konahuanuiensis Sporck-Koehler, M.Waite & A.M.Williams

= Cyanea konahuanuiensis =

Species of plant

Cyanea konahuanuiensis, known by the common name of Hāhā mili'ohu (English: the Cyanea that is caressed by the mist), is a species of plant from the Ko'olau Mountains of O'ahu, Hawaiian Islands. It was described in 2015, and the wild population consists of approximately 20 mature plants. The species was assessed to be critically endangered in 2017.

== Classification and relation ==
With Cyanea konahuanuiensis being a part of the genius Cyanea and the family Campanulaceae, it shares similarities with other Cyanea species living in the wet forests of O'ahu, such as Cyanea crispa, Cyanea calycina, and Cyanea humboldtiana. All have elliptic leaves and some are pubescent. Their calyx lobe shape is oblong but differ in the color of their flowers, majority being a dark magenta while C. pilosa is white.

== Distribution and habitat ==
This species is endemic to southeastern O'ahu and was discovered in the Ko'olau mountain range in elevations of 884-932 meters. Cyanea konahuaniuensis is found in wet mesic forests. Their population is low due to development, invasive species, and climate change.

== Description ==
Cyanea konahuanuiensis is distinguished from all other species in the genus by having densely pubescent leaves, petioles, and flowers. The stems may be sparsely pubescent to glabrous, and it has long calyx lobes and a staminal column joined to the corolla. It is named after Konahuanui, the mountain where it was discovered. It has been successfully germinated in an arboretum at the University of Hawaii.

== Conservation ==
It is named after Konahuanui, the mountain where it was discovered. It has been successfully germinated in an arboretum at the University of Hawaii. Since 2013, the Harold L. Lyon Arbotertum has preserved the C. konahuanuiensis seeds and seedlings to conserve the species. Only 20 existing mature Cyanea konahuanuiensis in existence due to rats, feral pigs, slugs, development, and climate change issues. Programs such as Hawaii Plant Extinction Prevention (PEP) and Hawaii Division of Forestry and Wildlife (DOFAW) strive to protect Hawaiian endangered plant species and implement game cameras to obtain more information about them through observation.
