= Cyanea acuminata =

Conservation status
- Critically Endangered (IUCN 3.1)

Scientific classification
- Kingdom: Plantae
- Clade: Tracheophytes
- Clade: Angiosperms
- Clade: Eudicots
- Clade: Asterids
- Order: Asterales
- Family: Campanulaceae
- Genus: Cyanea
- Species: C. acuminata

Binomial name
- Cyanea acuminata (Gaudich.) Hillebr.

Synonyms
- Cyanea occultens

Species of flowering plant

Cyanea acuminata is a rare species of flowering plant known by the common names Honolulu cyanea. It is endemic to Oahu, where there are no more than 250 individuals remaining. It is a federally listed endangered species of the United States. Like other Cyanea it is known as haha in Hawaiian.

This Hawaiian lobelioid is a shrub up to 2 meters tall. It grows in wet forests and on slopes and ridges in the Koʻolau and Waiʻanae Mountains of Oahu.

The remaining plants are divided among 18 subpopulations which are threatened by damage to their habitat from feral pigs and goats, rats, and exotic plants such as Maui pamakani (Ageratina adenophora), kukui (Aleurites moluccanus), and ti plant (Cordyline fruticosa). Other threats to the plant and its habitat include fire and trampling by military personnel. Botanists are hopeful that there are many more than 250 plants remaining in unsurveyed areas of the island.
