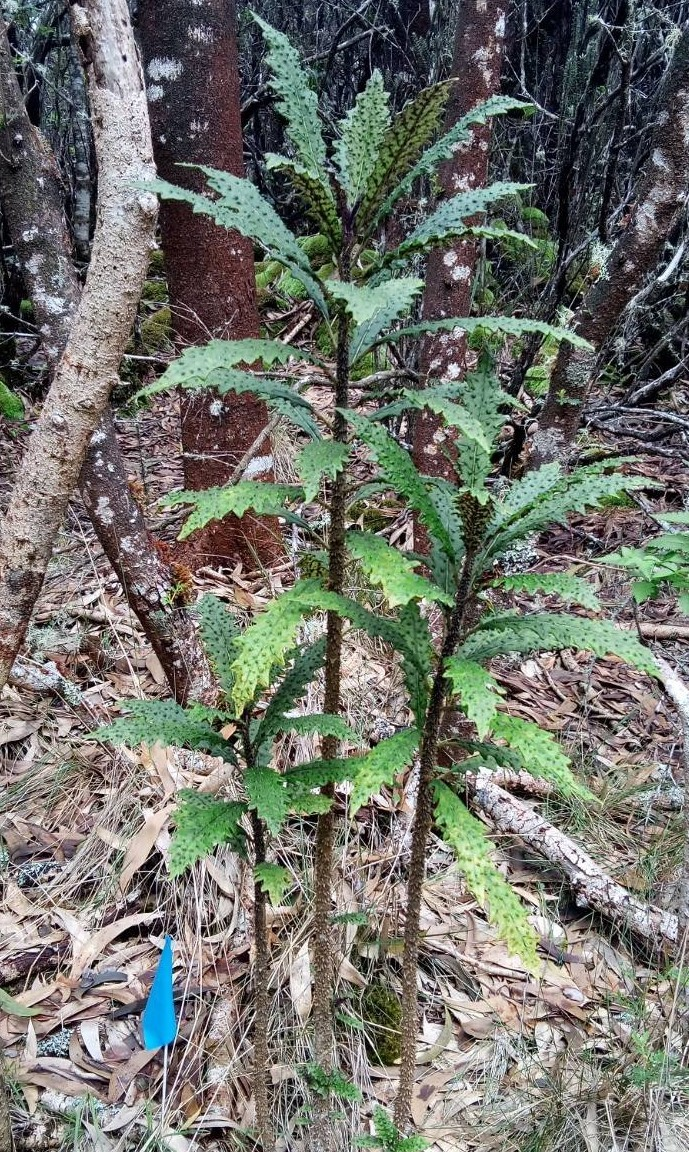
- Cyanea stictophylla in Hawaii County, United States

Conservation status
- Critically Endangered (IUCN 2.3)

Scientific classification
- Kingdom: Plantae
- Clade: Tracheophytes
- Clade: Angiosperms
- Clade: Eudicots
- Clade: Asterids
- Order: Asterales
- Family: Campanulaceae
- Genus: Cyanea
- Species: C. stictophylla

Binomial name
- Cyanea stictophylla Rock

= Cyanea stictophylla =

Species of flowering plant

Cyanea stictophylla is a rare species of flowering plant in the bellflower family known by the common name Kaiholena cyanea. It is endemic to the island of Hawaii, where it is known only from the rainforests of Mauna Loa. It is a federally listed endangered species of the United States. Like other Cyanea it is known as haha in Hawaiian.

This Hawaiian lobelioid is a shrub or tree of the rainforest. It has become rare due to the grazing and trampling damage of cattle. There are perhaps 20 individuals remaining.
