= Cyanea heluensis =

Scientific classification
- Kingdom: Plantae
- Clade: Tracheophytes
- Clade: Angiosperms
- Clade: Eudicots
- Clade: Asterids
- Order: Asterales
- Family: Campanulaceae
- Genus: Cyanea
- Species: C. heluensis

Binomial name
- Cyanea heluensis H.Oppenh.

Species of plant in family Campanulaceae

Cyanea heluensis is a species of plant in the bellflower family Campanulaceae. It is a rare plant, found only on the Hawaiian island of Maui. It was discovered by botanist Hank Oppenheimer in 2010.

== Description ==
This is a much branched, sprawling or ascendant shrub with stems to about 3 m (9.8 ft) long. The leaves are dark green above and paler beneath, clustered towards the ends of the branches and measure up to 29 cm (11 in) long and 6 cm (2.4 in) wide. They are attached to the branches by a petiole about 4 cm (1.6 in) long, the midrib of the leaf is purple underneath and the leaf margins are shallowly lobed. The plant produces white sap.

Inflorescences occur in the axils of the lower leaves. They are finely hairy on most parts and have between 5 and 10 flowers. The calyx is green and about 5 mm (0.20 in) long, the corolla tube is white and slightly curved, about 50 mm (2 in) long and 5 mm (0.20 in) wide with lobes about 15 mm (0.6 in) long. The fruit is an orange berry up to 10 mm (0.39 in) diameter containing a number of small brown seeds that are less than 1 mm (0.04 in) long.

== Taxonomy ==
The plant was first encountered in 2010 by botanist Hank Oppenheimer in remote highlands of West Maui Mountains. It was immediately recognised as being a new species of Cyanea, a genus of 81 species as of August 2025, all of which are endemic to the Hawaiian islands. Oppenheimer collected samples of the plant in a later visit to the site, from which he produced his description, published in 2020.

=== Etymology ===
The specific epithet heluensis refers to the location of the original find on the slopes of Helu peak, combined with the Latin suffix -ensis, 'from'.

== Conservation status ==
As of August 2025, the species had not been assessed by the IUCN, however Oppenheimer states in his paper that "When evaluated using the World Conservation Union (IUCN) criteria for endangerment (IUCN 2001), Cyanea heluensis easily falls into the Critically Endangered (CR) category". The plant faces multiple threats including a very low population, a very small range, decline in pollinators and seed dispersers, and exotic pests and competitors. At the time of publication of Oppenheimer's description, only one individual was known in the wild. Since that time, however, clones have been produced by Maui Plant Extinction Prevention Program, Olinda Rare Plant Facility staff, and Forestry and Wildlife, and have been returned to the area where the original plant is located.
