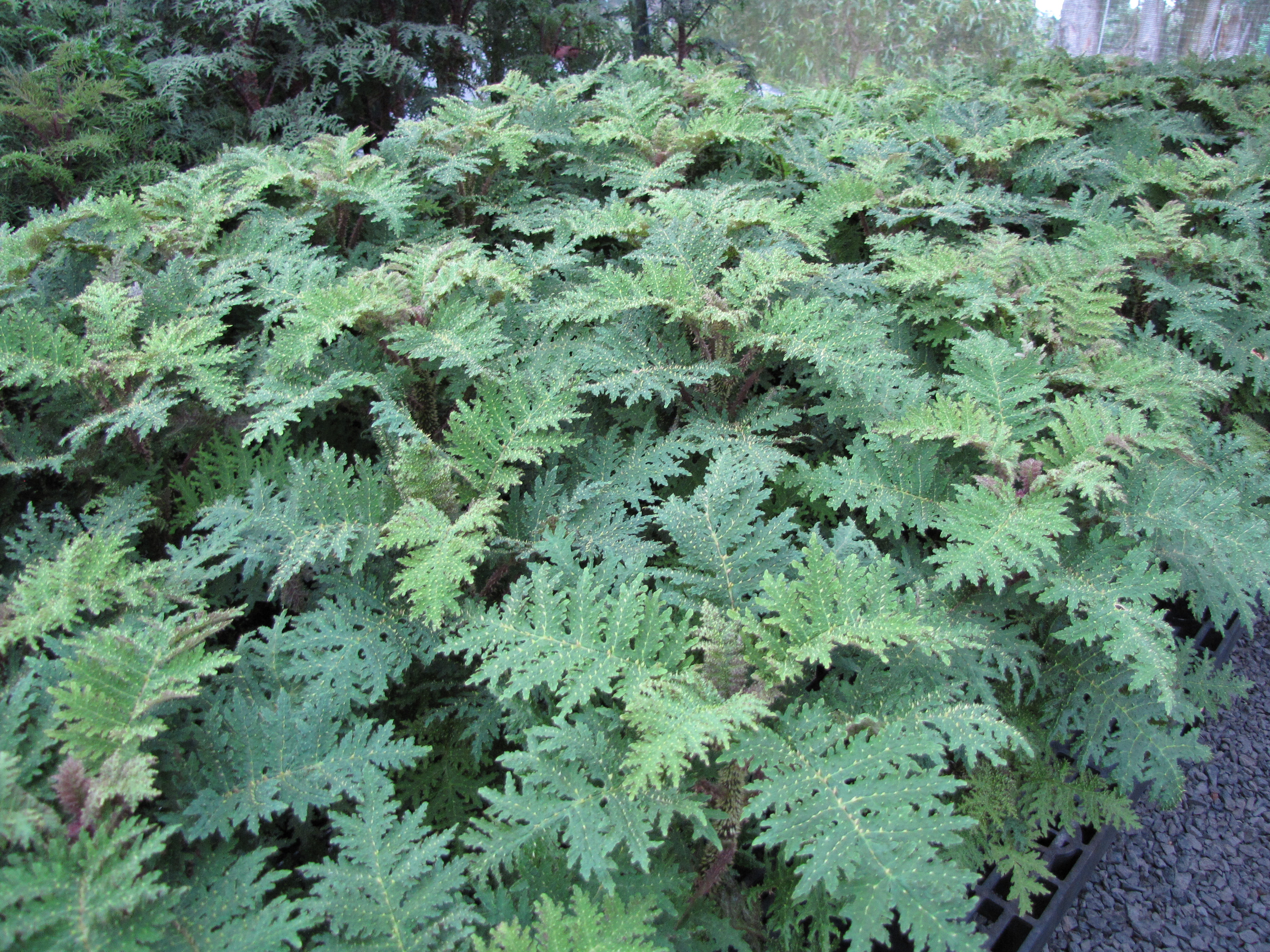

Conservation status
- Critically Endangered (IUCN 3.1)

- Imperiled (NatureServe)

Scientific classification
- Kingdom: Plantae
- Clade: Embryophytes
- Clade: Tracheophytes
- Clade: Angiosperms
- Clade: Eudicots
- Clade: Asterids
- Order: Asterales
- Family: Campanulaceae
- Genus: Cyanea
- Species: C. horrida

Binomial name
- Cyanea horrida (Rock) O.Deg. & Hosaka

Synonyms
- Cyanea ferox var. horrida Rock; Cyanea lobata var. hamakuae Rock; Delissea horrida (Rock) H.St.John; Delissea kipahuluensis H.St.John; Delissea lobata var. hamakuae (Rock) H.St.John

= Cyanea horrida =

Species of flowering plant native to Hawaii

Cyanea horrida, the prickly cyanea or hāhā nui, is a small, prickly tree from the Campanulaceae family which grows roughly 1–3 m (3.3–9.8 ft) which is endemic to east Maui. It is critically endangered with an unknown amount of specimens currently in existence. C. horrida is pollinated by honeycreeper birds.

== Habitat ==
Cyanea horrida is found in high-altitude rainforests and cliffs, above 1,500 m (4,900 ft) in elevation, in an approximately 13,934 ha (34,430 acres) area along the slopes of Haleakalā, mostly in the east-to-northeast regions.

== Description ==
Cyanea horrida is small, only 1–3 m (3.3–9.8 ft) in height, with "palm-like" fronds for leaves which are pinnately parted or divided, approximately 20-37 centimeters long and 10–19 cm (3.9–7.5 in) wide. The flowers come in inflorescences of 5-8, with purple flowers, yielding yellow berries. Most parts of the plant, including leaves and trunk, are covered in small protrusions.
