= Cyanea recta =

Conservation status
- Imperiled (NatureServe)

- Endangered (IUCN 3.1)

Scientific classification
- Kingdom: Plantae
- Clade: Tracheophytes
- Clade: Angiosperms
- Clade: Eudicots
- Clade: Asterids
- Order: Asterales
- Family: Campanulaceae
- Genus: Cyanea
- Species: C. recta

Binomial name
- Cyanea recta (Wawra) Hillebr.

Synonyms
- Cyanea larrisonii; Cyanea rockii

Species of flowering plant

Cyanea recta is a rare species of flowering plant in the bellflower family known by the common names upright cyanea and Kealia cyanea. It is endemic to Hawaii, where it is known only from the island of Kauai. It is a federally listed threatened species of the United States. Like other Cyanea it is known as haha in Hawaiian.

== Description ==
This Hawaiian lobelioid is a shrub growing up to 1.5 meters tall. The inflorescence bears purple-striped white or solid purple flowers. It grows in wet forest habitat in the understory of ʻōhiʻa lehua (Metrosideros polymorpha). The fruit color is purple. It can bloom at anytime of the year. The elliptic leaves are from 12 to 28 inches long, with toothed margins. The upper part of the leaf is smooth and green, while the lower part is pale green with hairs. 5 to 7 flowers are arraigned in a inflorescence stalk.

== Distribution and habitat ==
A 1998 survey estimated up to 1500 individuals remaining in seven populations. These are in a few locations on Kauai, including the Makaleha Mountains. By 2008 one population apparently contained "several thousand" plants.

The habitat is threatened with degradation and destruction by a number of forces, especially feral pigs and exotic plant species such as fireweed and Koster's curse (Clidemia hirta). It is native to Mesic forests.
