= Cyanea eleeleensis =

Conservation status
- Extinct (IUCN 3.1)

Scientific classification
- Kingdom: Plantae
- Clade: Tracheophytes
- Clade: Angiosperms
- Clade: Eudicots
- Clade: Asterids
- Order: Asterales
- Family: Campanulaceae
- Genus: Cyanea
- Species: †C. eleeleensis

Binomial name
- †Cyanea eleeleensis (H.St.John) Lammers

Synonyms
- Delissea eleeleensis

Species of flowering plant

Cyanea eleeleensis was a rare species of flowering plant in the bellflower family known by the common name Eleele cyanea. It was endemic to Kauai, where it has been declared extinct. It was federally listed as a critically endangered species of the United States in 2010. Like other Cyanea it is known as haha in Hawaiian.

This Hawaiian lobelioid was discovered in 1977 near a gulch called Pali ʻEleʻele on Kauai. The shrub is known to grow nearly two metres (6 ft 7 in) tall with leaves up to 40 centimetres (16 in) long by 11 centimetres (4.3 in) wide. The inflorescence bears up to 20 tubular flowers which are purple in color with paler longitudinal stripes.

Threats to this rare species included habitat degradation by feral pigs, exotic plants, and landslides.
