= Cyanea procera =

Conservation status
- Critically Endangered (IUCN 2.3)

Scientific classification
- Kingdom: Plantae
- Clade: Tracheophytes
- Clade: Angiosperms
- Clade: Eudicots
- Clade: Asterids
- Order: Asterales
- Family: Campanulaceae
- Genus: Cyanea
- Species: C. procera

Binomial name
- Cyanea procera Hillebr.

Species of flowering plant

Cyanea procera is a rare species of flowering plant in the bellflower family known by the common name Molokai cyanea. It is endemic to Hawaii, where it is known only from the island of Molokaʻi. It is a federally listed endangered species of the United States. Like other Cyanea it is known as haha in Hawaiian.

This plant has been reduced to very low numbers. At one time it was thought to be extinct. By 1992 there were four plants known. By 2005 there was only a single plant of this species existing in the wild. Plant propagation efforts have not been successful.

This Hawaiian lobelioid is a tree which looks superficially like a palm. It is known from montane wet forests on Molokaʻi, a habitat with a dense, closed canopy and a shady understory. Associated plants include Asplenium spp., pilo (Coprosma ochracea), māmaki (Pipturus albidus), olonā (Touchardia latifolia), Sadleria spp., ōpuhe (Urera glabra), Cheirodendron spp., Cibotium spp., Machaerina spp., pua kala (Cyanea sonenocalyx), ōhā wai nui (Clermontia arborescens), Cyrtandra spp., and Diplazium species. The habitat is threatened with degradation and destruction by a number of forces, especially feral pigs and goats. Plants are damaged by slugs, snails, rats, and birds. They face competition from exotic plant species such as castor bean (Ricinus communis) and banana (Musa spp.).
