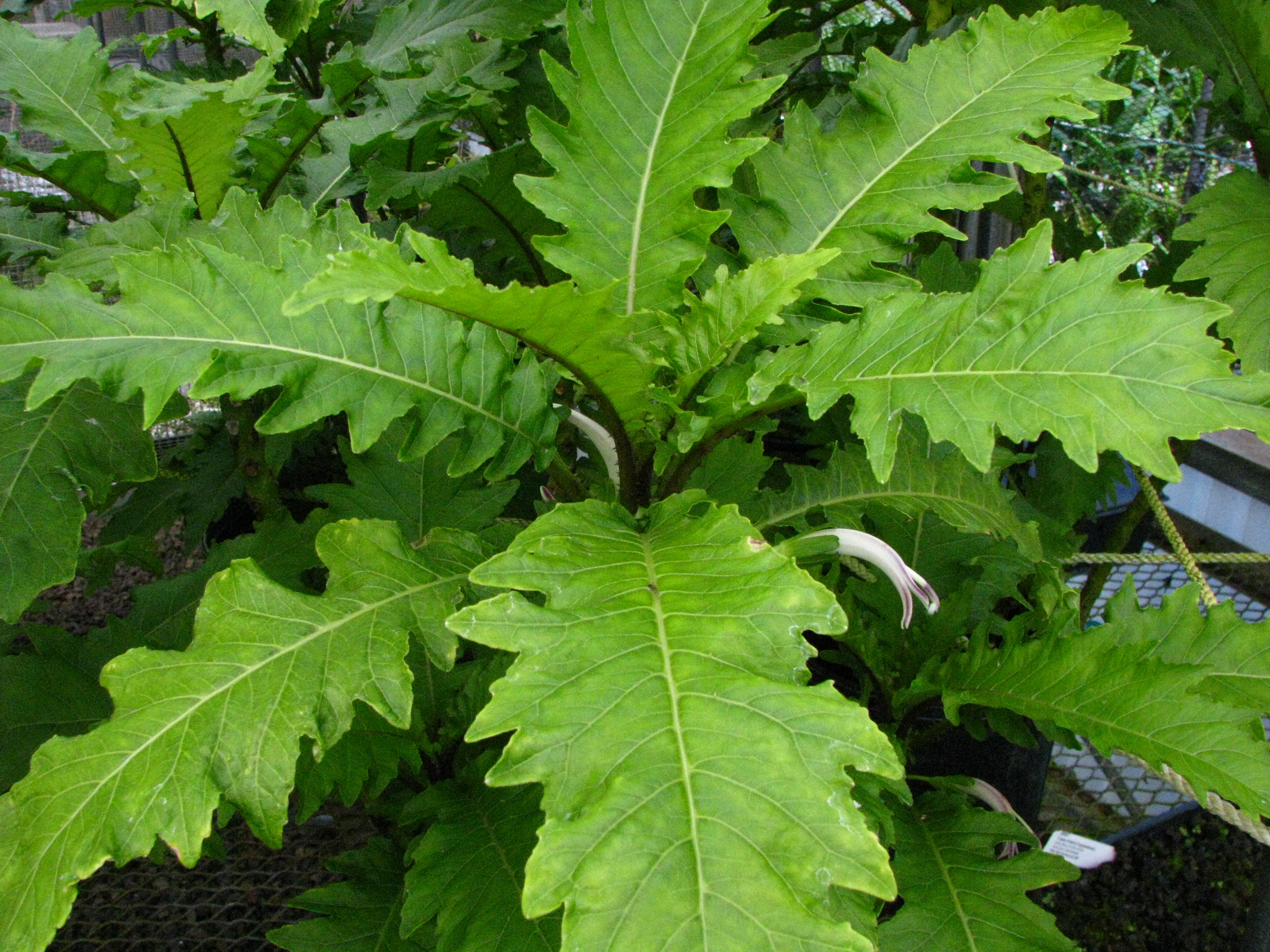
- Cyanea lobata

Scientific classification
- Kingdom: Plantae
- Clade: Tracheophytes
- Clade: Angiosperms
- Clade: Eudicots
- Clade: Asterids
- Order: Asterales
- Family: Campanulaceae
- Subfamily: Lobelioideae
- Genus: Cyanea; Gaudich.

Species
- about 78, see § Species

Synonyms
- Kittelia Rchb.; Macrochilus C.Presl; Rollandia Gaudich.

= Cyanea (plant) =

Genus of flowering plants

Cyanea is a genus of flowering plants in the family Campanulaceae that are endemic to Hawaii. The name Cyanea in Hawaiian is hāhā.

== Ecology ==
These Hawaiian lobelioids are endemic to Hawaii with over 90% of Cyanea species are found only on one island in the Hawaiian chain. They grow in moist and wet forest habitat and are largely pollinated by birds such as the Hawaiian honeycreepers, and the seeds are dispersed by birds that take the fruits.

== Description ==
Most Cyanea are trees with few branches or none. The inflorescence is a raceme of 4 to 45 flowers which grows from the leaf axils. The fruit is a fleshy berry.

=== Evolutionary anachronism ===
There have been several theories regarding the evolution of large prickles on these plants that are endemic to islands that lack any mammalian or reptilian herbivores. One such theory suggests that the prickles are a defense against herbivory by the moa-nalo, a few taxa of flightless ducks that went extinct on the islands within the last 1600 years, an example of evolutionary anachronism.

== Species ==
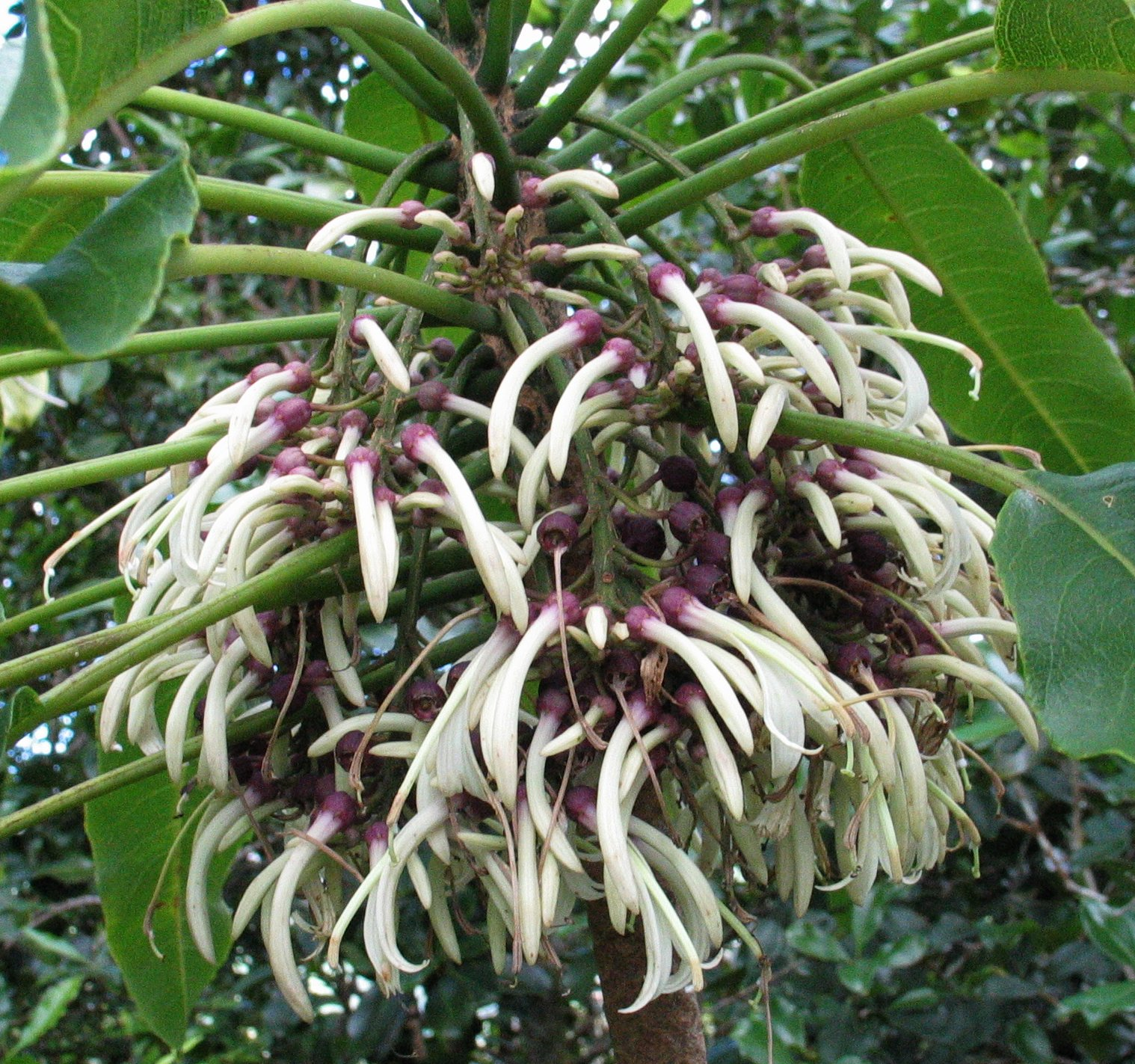
Cyanea angustifolia

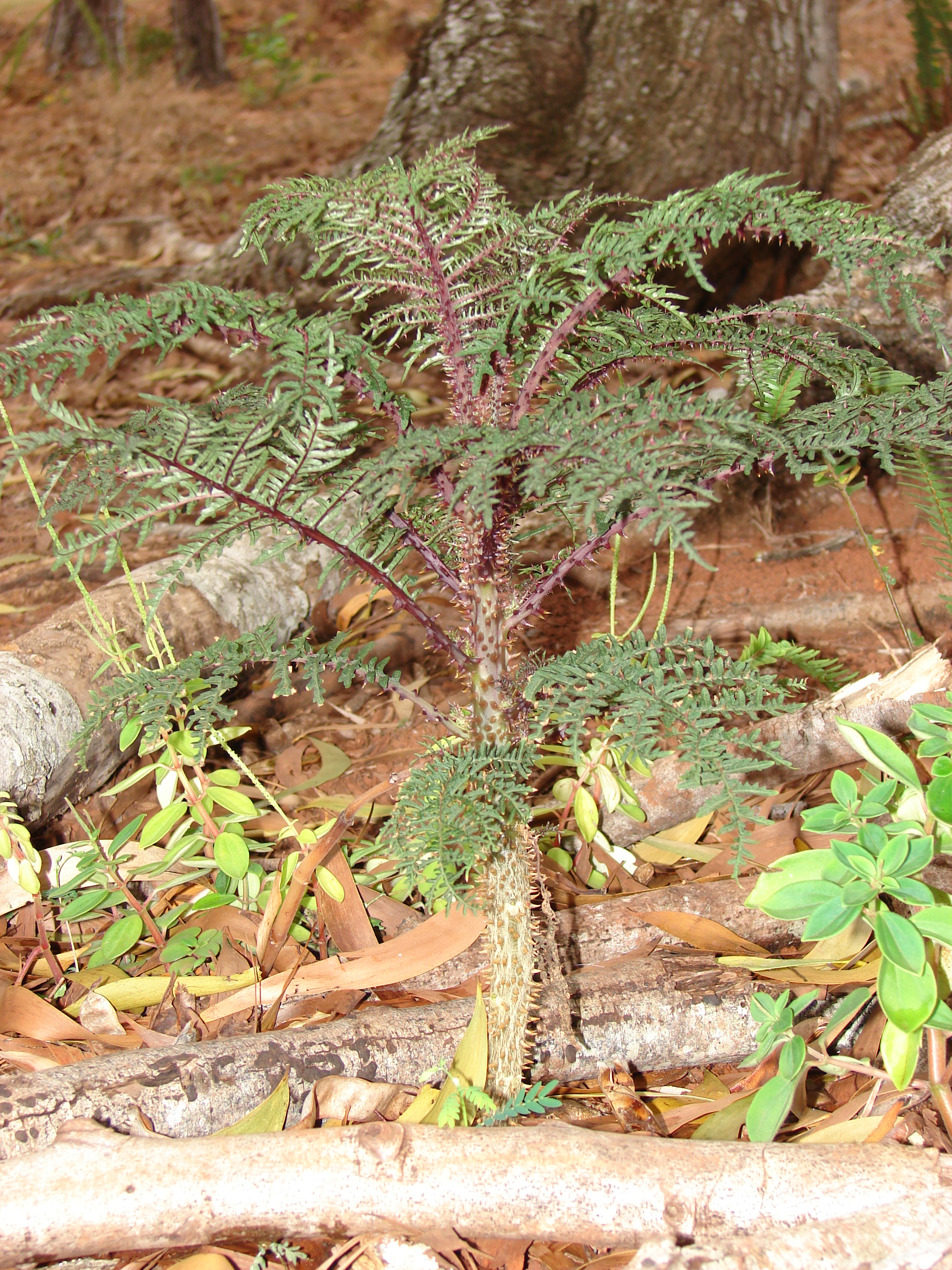
Cyanea duvalliorum

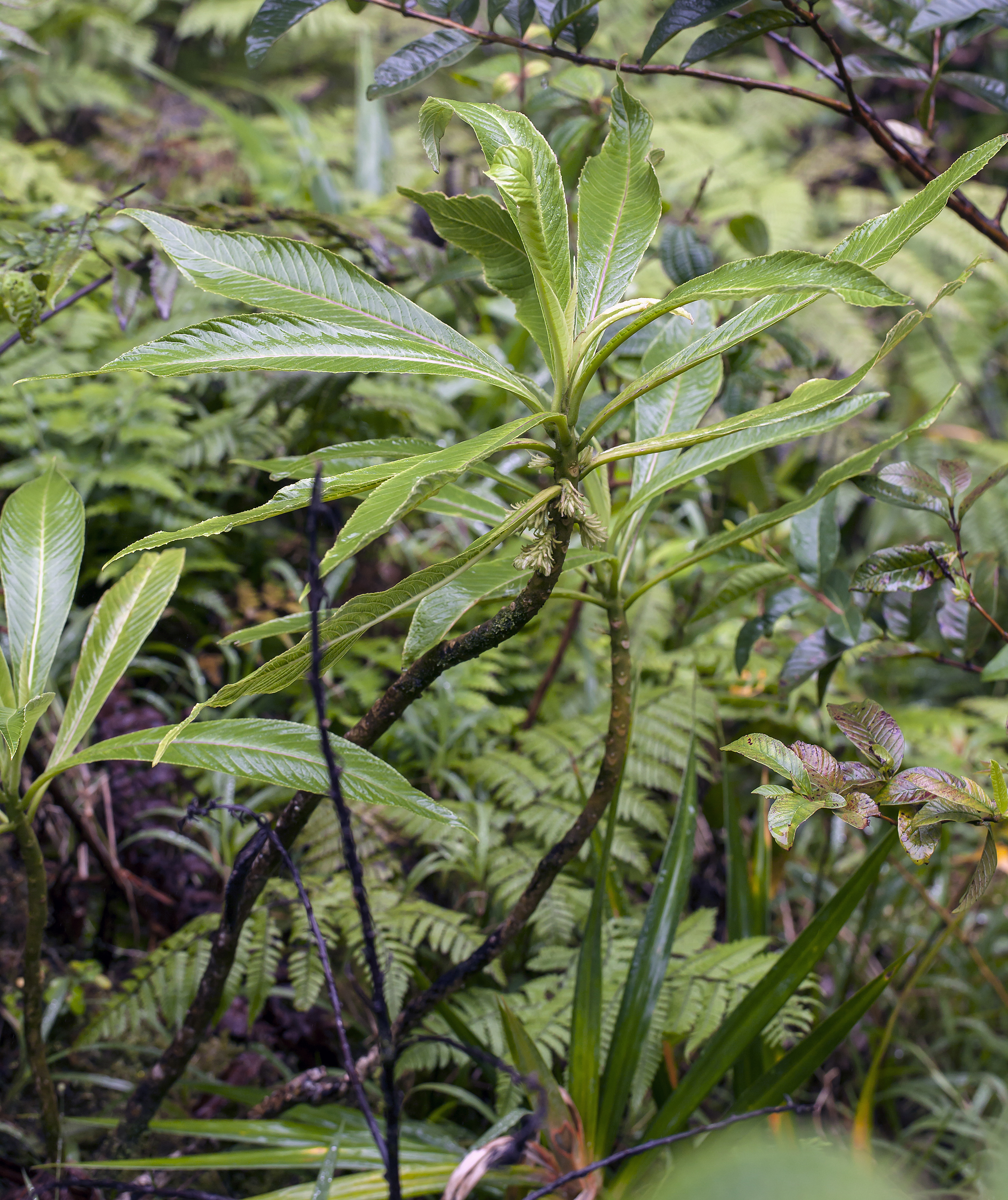
Cyanea fissa

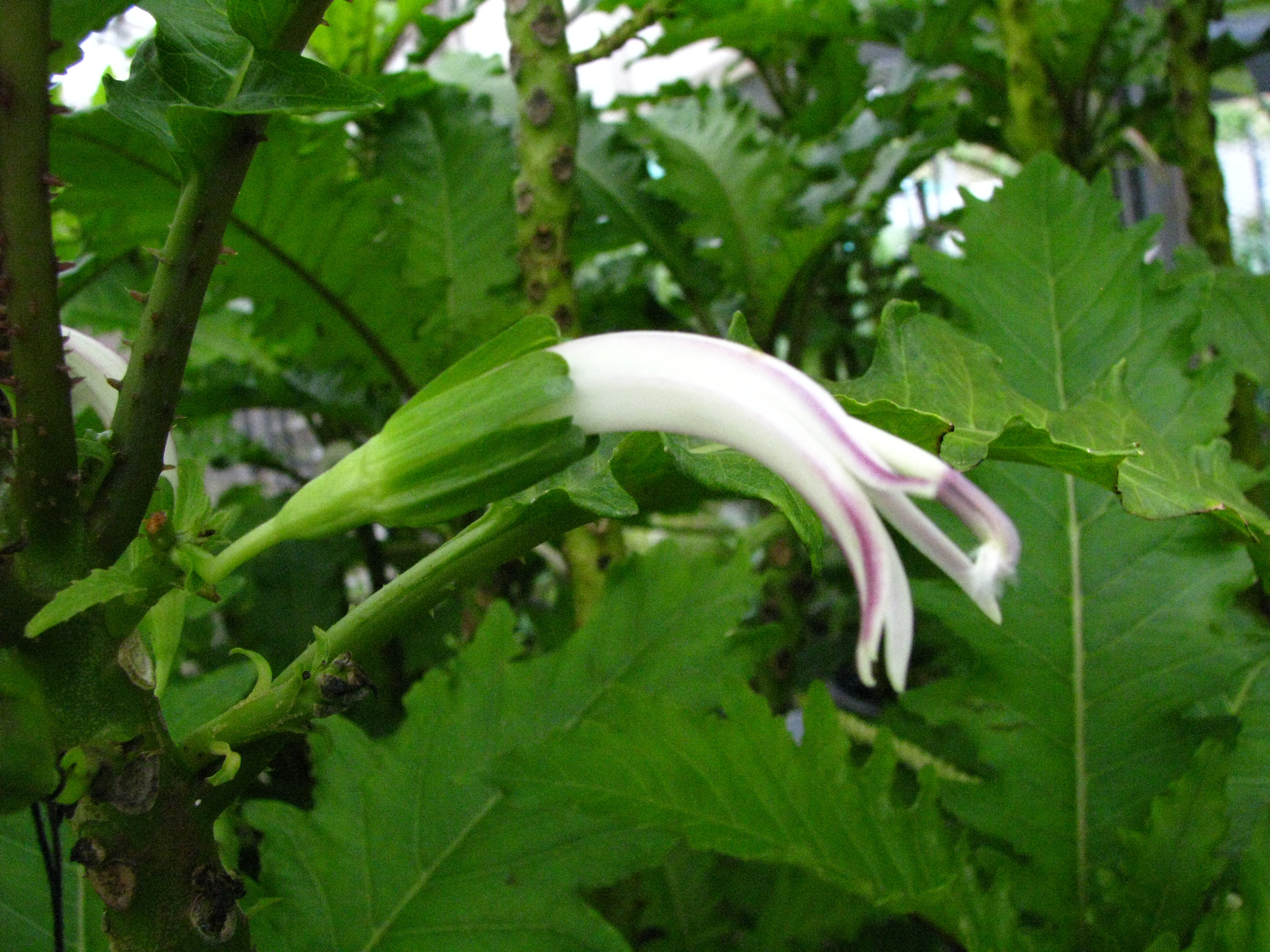
Cyanea lobata

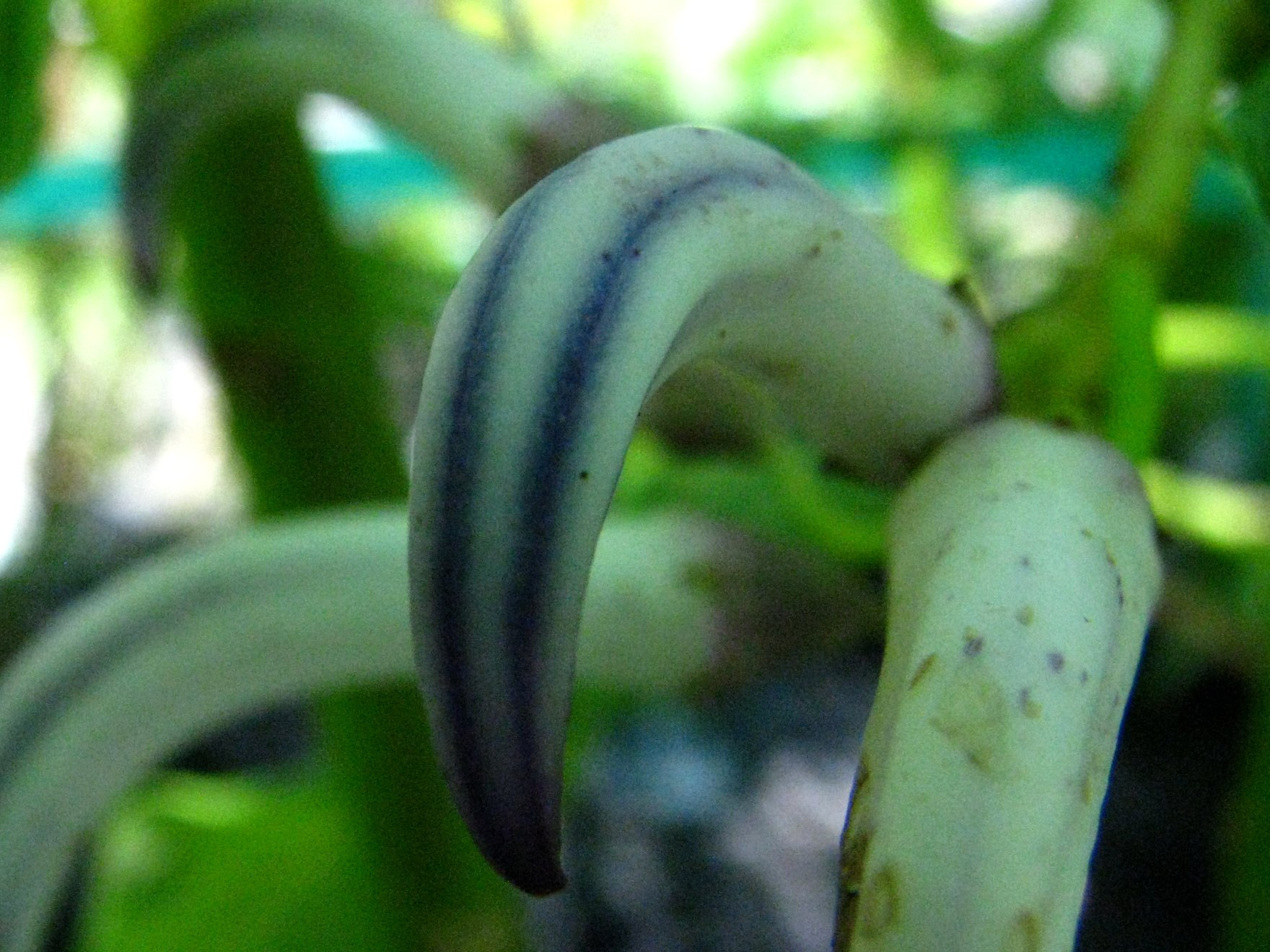
Cyanea rivularis

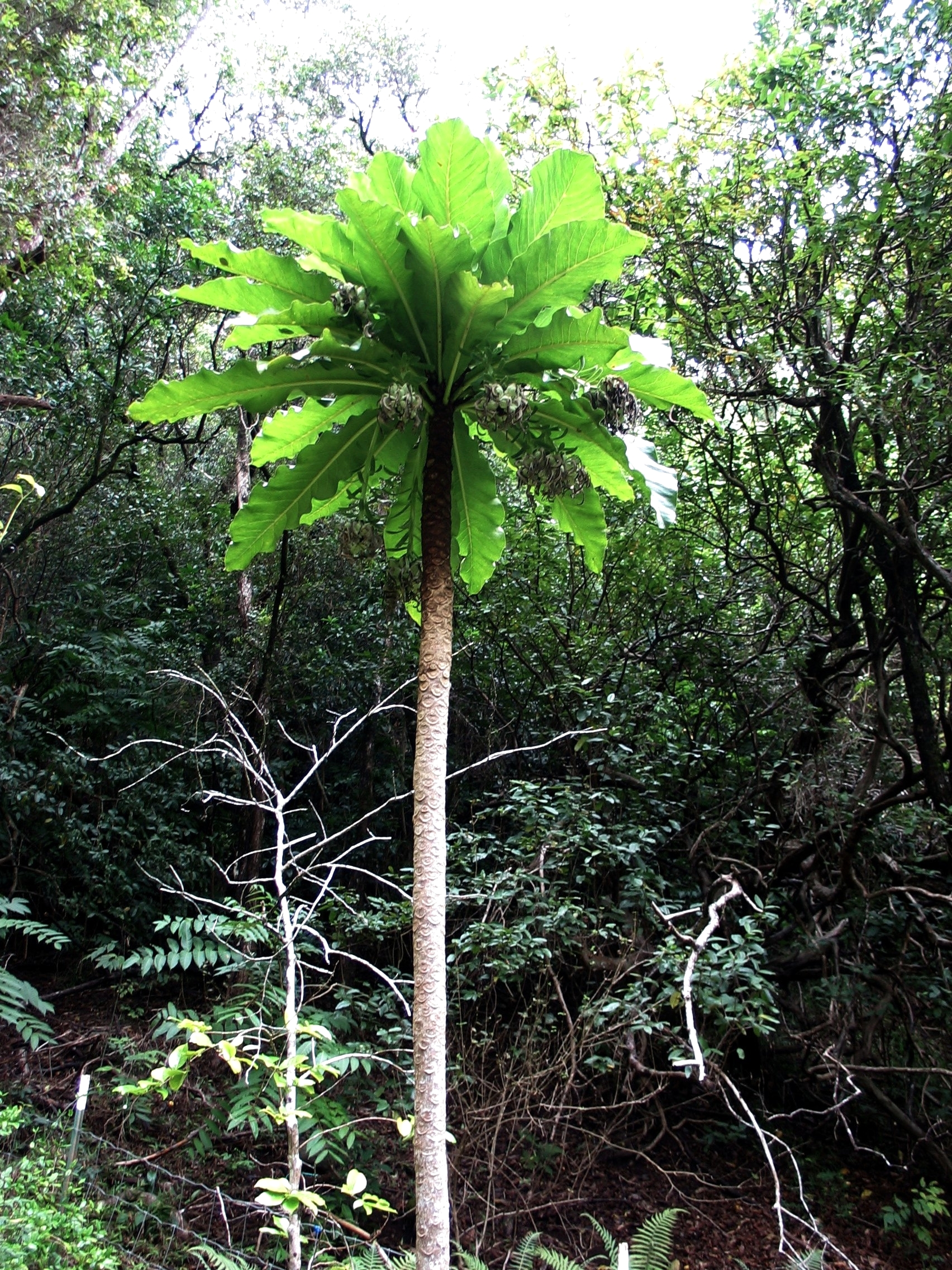
Cyanea superba

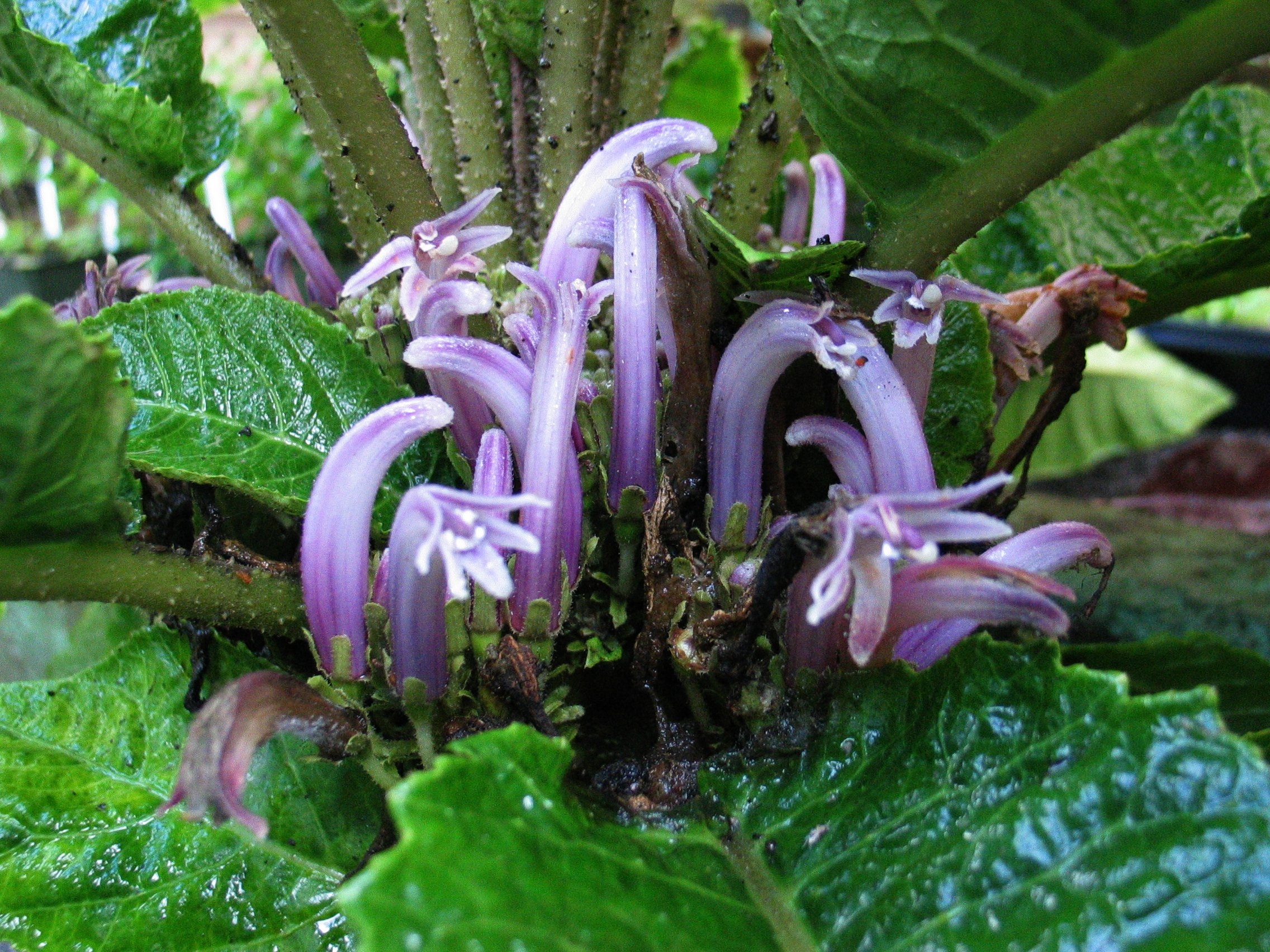
Cyanea truncata

81 species are accepted.

- Cyanea aculeatiflora Rock – Haleakala cyanea
- Cyanea acuminata (Gaudich.) Hillebr. – Honolulu cyanea
- Cyanea angustifolia (Cham.) Hillebr. – hāhā, ʻaku,
- Cyanea arborea Hillebr. – palmtree cyanea
- Cyanea asarifolia H.St.John – gingerleaf cyanea
- Cyanea aspleniifolia (H.Mann) Hillebr. – spleenwort cyanea
- Cyanea calycina (Cham.) Lammers – Waianae Range rollandia, Oʻahu cyanea
- Cyanea comata Hillebr. – Maui cyanea
- Cyanea copelandii Rock – treetrunk cyanea
- Cyanea coriacea (A.Gray) Hillebr. – leatherleaf cyanea
- Cyanea crispa (Gaudich.) Lammers, Givnish & Sytsma – Koolau Range rollandia
- Cyanea cylindrocalyx (Rock) Lammers – Splitleaf cyanea
- Cyanea dolichopoda Lammers & Lorence – long-foot cyanea
- Cyanea dunbariae Rock – ravine cyanea
- Cyanea duvalliorum Lammers & H.Oppenh.
- Cyanea eleeleensis (H.St.John) Lammers – eleele cyanea
- Cyanea elliptica (Rock) Lammers – ellipticleaf cyanea
- Cyanea fissa (H.Mann) Hillebr. – Kauai cyanea
- Cyanea floribunda E.Wimm. – Degener's cyanea
- Cyanea gibsonii Hillebr.
- Cyanea giffardii Rock – Kilauea Mauna cyanea
- Cyanea glabra (E.Wimm.) H.St.John – smooth cyanea
- Cyanea grimesiana Gaudich. – splitleaf cyanea
- Cyanea habenata (H.St.John) Lammers – stream-bed cyanea
- Cyanea hamatiflora Rock – wetforest cyanea
- Cyanea hardyi Rock – Oahu cyanea
- Cyanea heluensis H.Oppenh.
- Cyanea hirtella (H.Mann) Hillebr. – rustyleaf cyanea
- Cyanea horrida (Rock) O.Deg. & Hosaka – prickly cyanea, holokea, hāhā nui
- Cyanea humboldtiana (Gaudich.) Lammers, Givnish & Sytsma – Oahu rollandia
- Cyanea kahiliensis (H.St.John) Lammers – spoonleaf cyanea
- Cyanea kauaulaensis H.Oppenh. & Lorence
- Cyanea kolekoleensis (H.St.John) Lammers – kolekole cyanea
- Cyanea konahuanuiensis Sporck-Koehler, M.Waite & A.M.Williams – Hāhā miliʻohu
- Cyanea koolauensis Lammers, Givnish & Sytsma – Palolo Valley rollandia
- Cyanea kuhihewa Lammers – Limahuli Valley cyanea
- Cyanea kunthiana (Gaudich.) Hillebr. – Kunth's cyanea
- Cyanea lanceolata (Gaudich.) Lammers, Givnish & Sytsma – lanceleaf cyanea
- Cyanea leptostegia A.Gray – giant kokee cyanea
- Cyanea linearifolia Rock – linearleaf cyanea
- Cyanea lobata H.Mann – Waihee Valley cyanea
- Cyanea longiflora (Wawra) Lammers, Givnish & Sytsma – ridge rollandia
- Cyanea longissima (Rock) H.St.John – streambank cyanea
- Cyanea macrostegia Hillebr. – purple cyanea
- Cyanea magnicalyx Lammers
- Cyanea mannii (Brigham ex H.Mann) Hillebr. – Mann's cyanea
- Cyanea maritae Lammers & H.Oppenh.
- Cyanea marksii Rock – Marks' cyanea
- Cyanea mauiensis (Rock) Lammers – Maui cyanea
- Cyanea mceldowneyi Rock – McEldowney's cyanea
- Cyanea membranacea Rock – papery cyanea
- Cyanea minutiflora Lammers
- Cyanea munroi (Hosaka) Lammers – Munro's cyanea
- Cyanea obtusa (A.Gray) Hillebr. – bluntlobe cyanea
- Cyanea parvifolia (C.N.Forbes) Lammers, Givnish & Sytsma – Waioli Valley rollandia
- Cyanea pilosa A.Gray – hairy cyanea
- Cyanea pinnatifida (Cham.) E.Wimm. – sharktail cyanea
- Cyanea platyphylla (A.Gray) Hillebr. – puna cyanea
- Cyanea pohaku Lammers – pohaku cyanea
- Cyanea procera Hillebr. – Molokai cyanea
- Cyanea profuga C.N.Forbes – Mapulehu Valley cyanea
- Cyanea pseudofauriei Lammers – hāhā
- Cyanea purpurellifolia (Rock) Lammers, Givnish & Sytsma – Panaluu Mountain rollandia
- Cyanea pycnocarpa (Hillebr.) E.Wimm. – manyfruit cyanea
- Cyanea quercifolia (Hillebr.) E.Wimm. – oakleaf cyanea
- Cyanea recta (Wawra) Hillebr. – Kealia cyanea
- Cyanea remyi Rock – Remy's cyanea
- Cyanea rivularis Rock – plateau cyanea
- Cyanea salicina H.Lév. – willow cyanea
- Cyanea scabra Hillebr. – harsh cyanea
- Cyanea sessilifolia (O.Deg.) Lammers – sessileleaf cyanea
- Cyanea shipmanii Rock – Shipman's cyanea
- Cyanea solanacea Hillebr. – popolo
- Cyanea solenocalyx Hillebr. – pua kala, molokai
- Cyanea spathulata (Hillebr.) A.Heller – spoonleaf cyanea
- Cyanea st.-johnii (Hosaka) Lammers, Givnish & Sytsma – St. John's rollandia
- Cyanea stictophylla Rock – Kaiholena cyanea
- Cyanea superba (Cham.) A.Gray – Mt. Kaala cyanea
- Cyanea tritomantha A.Gray – ʻaku ʻaku, ʻaku
- Cyanea truncata (Rock) Rock – Punaluu cyanea
- Cyanea undulata C.N.Forbes – leechleaf cyanea
