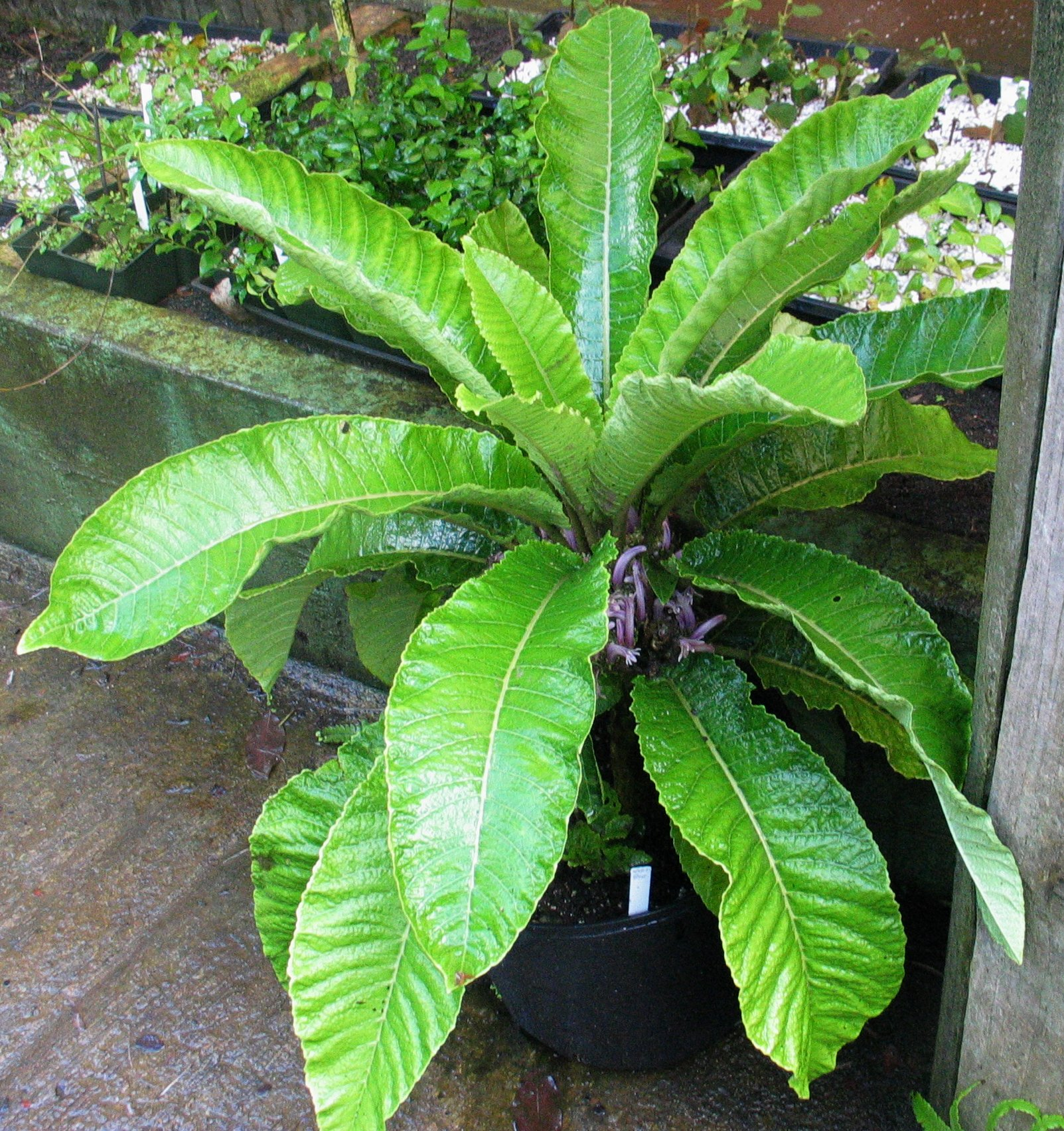

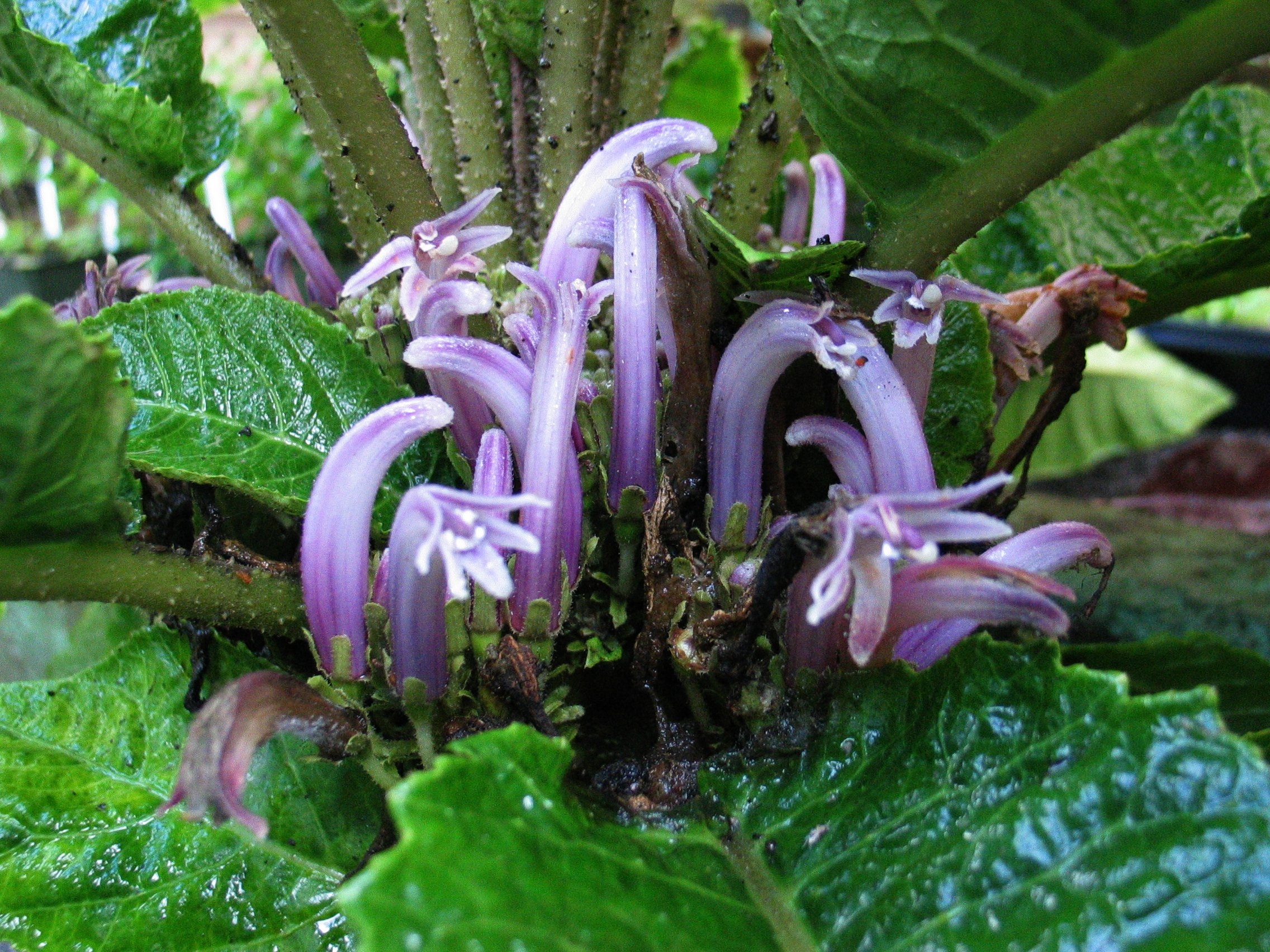
- Cyanea truncata flowers

Conservation status
- Critically Endangered (IUCN 3.1)

Scientific classification
- Kingdom: Plantae
- Clade: Tracheophytes
- Clade: Angiosperms
- Clade: Eudicots
- Clade: Asterids
- Order: Asterales
- Family: Campanulaceae
- Genus: Cyanea
- Species: C. truncata

Binomial name
- Cyanea truncata Rock

= Cyanea truncata =

Species of flowering plant

Cyanea truncata is a rare species of flowering plant in the bellflower family known by the common name Punaluu cyanea. It is endemic to the islands of Oahu and Molokai in Hawaii, but it is now critically endangered. It exists in cultivation and some individuals have been planted in appropriate habitat. It is a federally listed endangered species of the United States. Like other Cyanea it is known as hāhā in Hawaiian.

By the 1980s this Hawaiian lobelioid was known only from the Koʻolau Mountains of Oahu, and the last plants were seen in 1983. No more were found until 1998 when one plant was discovered; it died in 2001 but by then its offspring were being propagated. In 2004 three plants were discovered and these were still alive two years later. In the meantime, the offspring of the propagated individual had been planted in appropriate habitat. Some of these are still alive today, growing inside an enclosure along with another endangered plant, Schiedea kaalae, where they are protected from feral pigs that rove the area.

The aforementioned pigs were a major force that drove the plant to near extinction. The animals are extremely destructive to the habitat, rooting the soil, tearing down larger vegetation, uprooting small plants and seedlings, and transporting the seeds of exotic plants into the area. Exotic plants that threaten this and other rare natives include kukui (Aleurites moluccanus), ti (Cordyline fruitcosa), and Christmas berry (Schinus terebinthifolius). Rats and slugs also damage the plants.
