= Cyanea mannii =

Conservation status
- Critically Endangered (IUCN 3.1)

- Imperiled (NatureServe)

Scientific classification
- Kingdom: Plantae
- Clade: Tracheophytes
- Clade: Angiosperms
- Clade: Eudicots
- Clade: Asterids
- Order: Asterales
- Family: Campanulaceae
- Genus: Cyanea
- Species: C. mannii

Binomial name
- Cyanea mannii (Brigham ex H.Mann) ) Hillebr.

Synonyms
- Homotypic Synonyms: Delissea mannii Brigham ex H.Mann; Heterotypic Synonyms: Delissea kawelaensis H.St.John

Species of flowering plant

Cyanea mannii is a rare species of flowering plant in the bellflower family, Campanulaceae. It is known by the common name Mann's cyanea. It is endemic to Hawaii, where it is known only from the island of Molokai. There are 9 occurrences with fewer than 3000 plants remaining. It is a federally listed endangered species. Like other Cyanea it is known as haha in Hawaiian.

This Hawaiian lobelioid is a shrub growing 1.5 to 3 metres (4 ft 11 in to 9 ft 10 in) tall with a palmlike cluster of leaves at the top of the stem. The inflorescence produces purple flowers. The plant grows in moist forest habitat. Threats to the species include degradation of this habitat by feral pigs and rodents.
