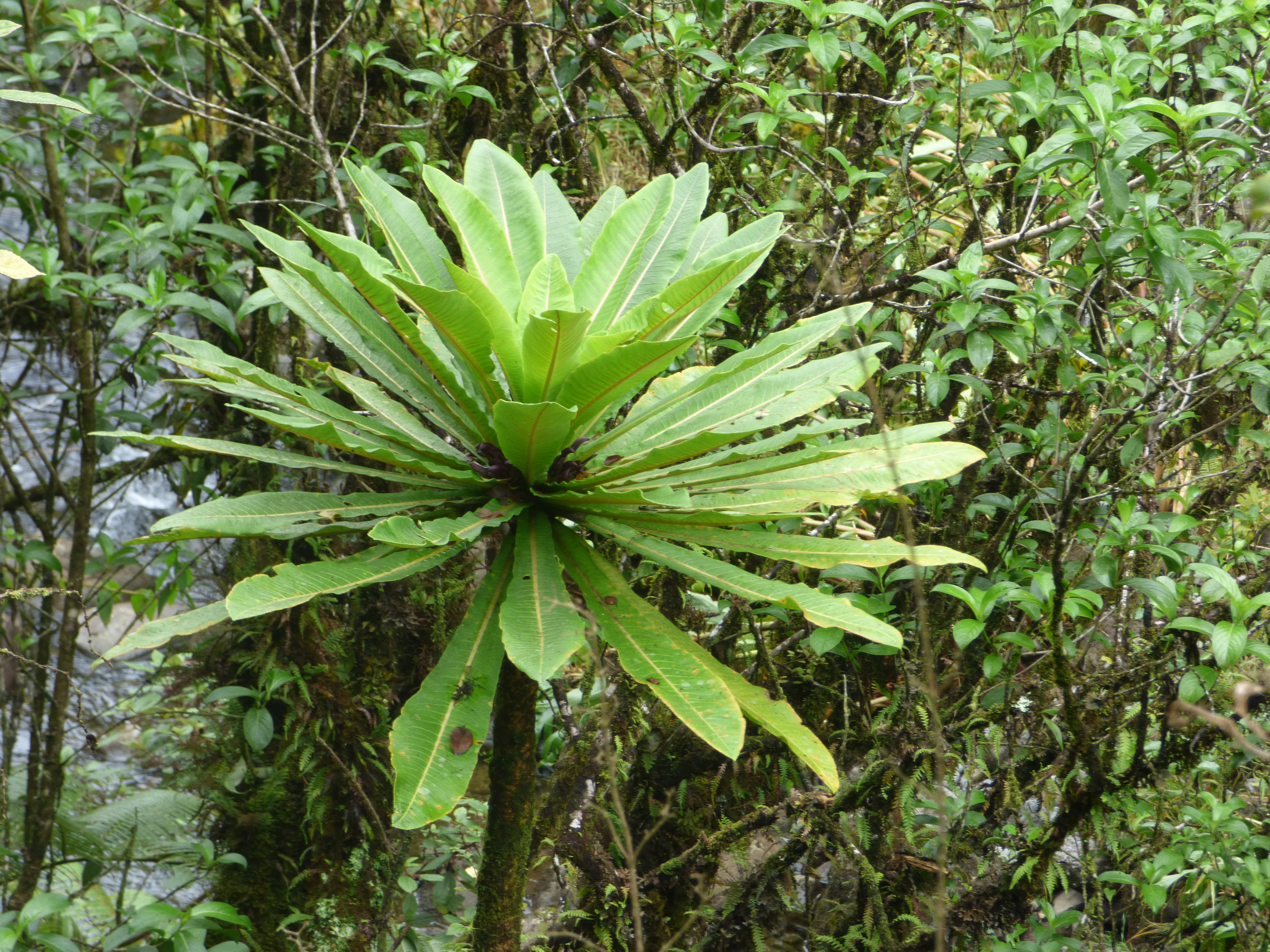

Conservation status
- Critically Endangered (IUCN 3.1)

Scientific classification
- Kingdom: Plantae
- Clade: Tracheophytes
- Clade: Angiosperms
- Clade: Eudicots
- Clade: Asterids
- Order: Asterales
- Family: Campanulaceae
- Genus: Cyanea
- Species: C. hamatiflora

Binomial name
- Cyanea hamatiflora Rock

= Cyanea hamatiflora =

Species of bellflower plant

Cyanea hamatiflora is a rare species of flowering plant in the bellflower family known by the common name wetforest cyanea. It is endemic to Hawaii, where it is known from the islands of Maui and Hawaii, and there are probably fewer than 250 plants remaining in total. It is a federally listed endangered species. Like other Cyanea it is known as haha in Hawaiian.

There are two subspecies of this species. The more abundant, ssp. hamatiflora, is native to Maui, where there are no more than 250 individuals left and the population is dropping by at least 25% per generation. The rare ssp. carlsonii is now limited to 3 or 4 plants; other subpopulations and all seedlings planted in the habitat are thought to be gone.

This Hawaiian lobelioid is a rainforest shrub which is palm-like in appearance. Threats to the species include degradation of the habitat and damage to plants by feral pigs, goats, cattle, rats, slugs, and exotic plant species such as selfheal (Prunella vulgaris), Kahili ginger (Hedychium gardnerianum), and velvet tree (Miconia calvescens). Other threats include landslides and an unidentified insect that damages the fruit.
