= Cyanea dunbariae =

Conservation status
- Critically Endangered (IUCN 3.1)

Scientific classification
- Kingdom: Plantae
- Clade: Tracheophytes
- Clade: Angiosperms
- Clade: Eudicots
- Clade: Asterids
- Order: Asterales
- Family: Campanulaceae
- Genus: Cyanea
- Species: C. dunbariae

Binomial name
- Cyanea dunbariae Rock

Species of flowering plant

Cyanea dunbariae (often misspelled dunbarii) is a rare species of flowering plant in the bellflower family known by the common name ravine cyanea. It is endemic to Molokai, where there were sixteen plants remaining in the wild as of 2005. It is a federally listed endangered species of the United States. Like other Cyanea it is known as haha in Hawaiian.

This Hawaiian lobelioid is a branching shrub which grows in wet and moist forests and gulches in the Molokai Forest Reserve. The plant was not seen throughout much of the twentieth century until it was rediscovered in 1992 at the site of the single extant population. It is in decline. Threats to the species include its low numbers and limited gene pool, degradation of its habitat by axis deer, and feral pigs, damage to plants by slugs, rats, and birds, and competition by exotic plants such as climbing dayflower (Commelina diffusa), air plant (Kalanchoe pinnata), and castor bean (Ricinus communis).

Propagation efforts in the greenhouse have met with little success.
