= John Forbes (botanist) =

English botanist (1798–1823)

John Forbes, M.D. (1798–1823) was an English botanist.

== Life ==
Forbes was born in 1798, and became a pupil of John Shepherd of the Liverpool botanic garden. The Horticultural Society despatched him to the east coast of Africa, and he left London in February 1822, in the expedition commanded by Captain William Fitzwilliam Owen.

He sent home substantial collections from Madeira, Rio de Janeiro, the Cape of Good Hope, and Madagascar, before setting out to march up the Zambesi River to the Portuguese station at Zumbo, 300 leagues from the mouth of the river, and then southwards to the Cape. Less than halfway into the trip, he died of fatigue and privation at Sena in August 1823. The genus Forbesia, Eckl., commemorates him as collector.
