= Thomas J. Givnish =

American botanist (1951)

Thomas Joseph Givnish (born May 14, 1951) is an American botanist, ecologist, and evolutionary biologist, holder of the Henry Allan Gleason Chair in Botany and Environmental Studies at the University of Wisconsin. He has written extensively on speciation, adaptive radiation, and determinants of diversity in several plant groups, including Bromeliaceae, Rapateaceae, Orchidaceae as well as the Hawaiian lobelioids.

== Biography ==
Givnish was born in Philadelphia, Pennsylvania. He graduated from Princeton University with a BA in mathematics in 1973 and received his Ph.D. in biology there in 1976. His doctoral dissertation was entitled Leaf form in relation to environment: A theoretical study. He joined the University of Wisconsin-Madison in 1985, after having previously taught at Harvard University. He has published several studies on the adaptive significance of plant form and physiology, the interface between physiological and community ecology, the ecology and evolution of forest herbs, carnivorous plants, and epiphytes, fire ecology, evolution atop the tepuis of Venezuela, and self-assembly of patterned peatlands in the Florida Everglades. In 2003 he was made a Fellow of the American Association for the Advancement of Science. His botany author citation is "Givnish". He has given the official botanical name to 18 plant taxa listed in the International Plant Names Index.
