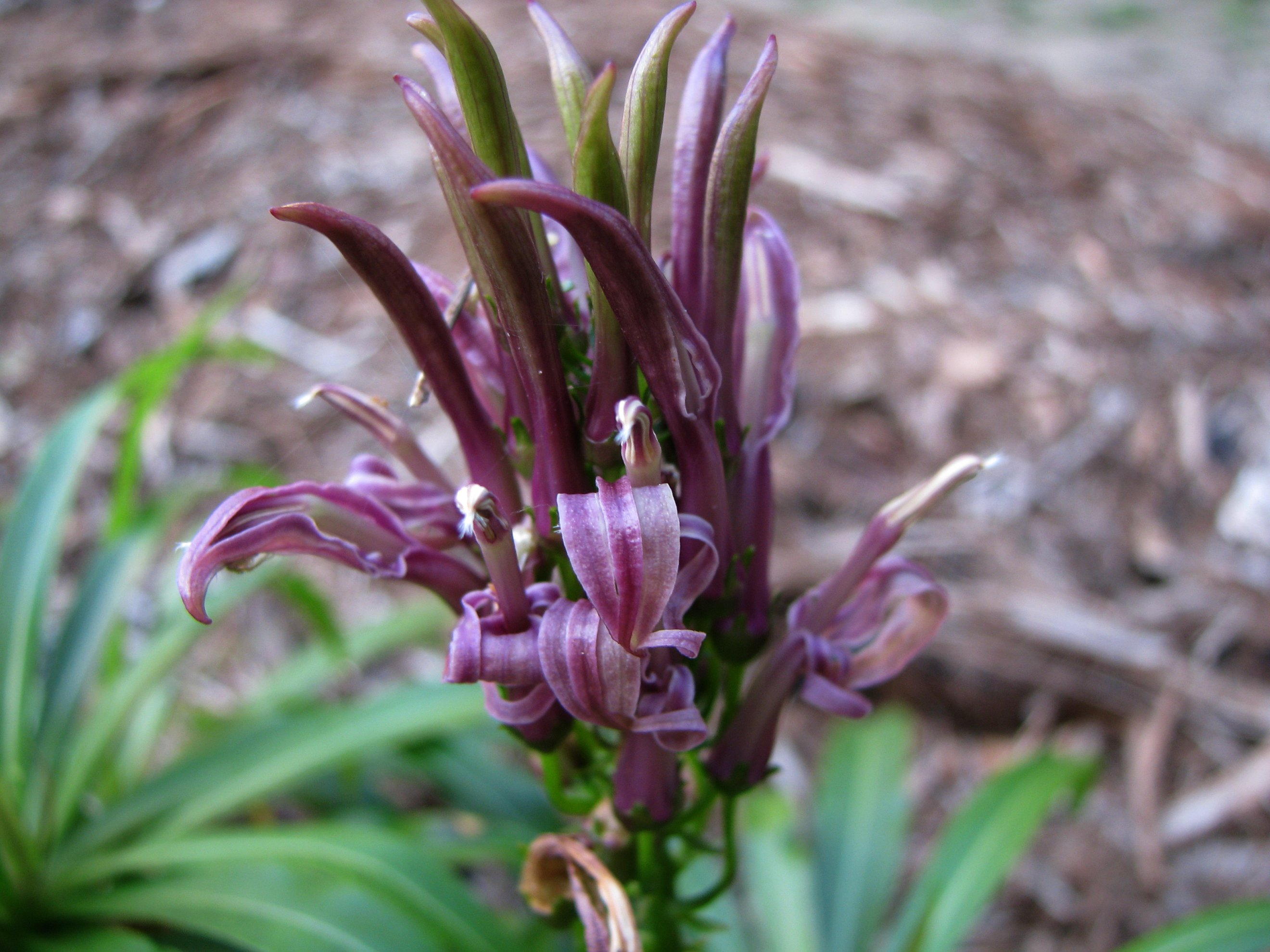
- Lobelia niihauensis, long terminal inflorescences of magenta flowers.

Scientific classification
- Kingdom: Plantae
- Clade: Tracheophytes
- Clade: Angiosperms
- Clade: Eudicots
- Clade: Asterids
- Order: Asterales
- Family: Campanulaceae
- Subfamily: Lobelioideae
- Informal group: Hawaiian lobelioids

Genera and sections
- Brighamia; Clermontia; Cyanea; Delissea; Lobelia sect. Galeatella; Lobelia sect. Revolutella; Trematolobelia

= Hawaiian lobelioids =

Group of flowering plants

The Hawaiian lobelioids are a group of flowering plants in the bellflower family, Campanulaceae, subfamily Lobelioideae, all of which are endemic to the Hawaiian Islands. This is the largest plant radiation in the Hawaiian Islands, and indeed the largest on any island archipelago, with over 125 species. The six genera involved can be broadly separated by growth habit: Clermontia are typically branched shrubs or small trees, up to 7 metres (23 ft) tall, with fleshy fruits; Cyanea and Delissea are typically unbranched or branching only at the base, with a cluster of relatively broad leaves at the apex and fleshy fruits; Lobelia and Trematolobelia have long thin leaves down a single, non-woody stem and capsular fruits with wind-dispersed seeds; and the peculiar Brighamia have a short, thick stem with a dense cluster of broad leaves, elongate white flowers, and capsular fruits. The relationships among the genera and sections remains unsettled as of April 2022.

Many species have beautiful and spectacular flowers, especially those in Lobelia and Trematolobelia. They are also highly vulnerable to feeding by feral ungulates such as feral pigs; the stems are only partly woody, and contain few defenses against herbivory. The bark contains a milky (but apparently non-poisonous) latex, and is often chewed by rats and pigs. Seedlings are also vulnerable to disturbance by pig digging, and in areas with high densities of pigs it is not uncommon to find the only lobelioids being epiphytic on larger trees or on fallen logs.

== Taxonomy ==
The group contains morphologically divergent species, and was long thought to have derived from at least three introductions: one for Lobelia and Trematolobelia, one for Brighamia, and one for Clermontia, Cyanea, and Delissea. Based on DNA sequence evidence, it was later suggested that all are derived from a single introduction. This was likely a Lobelia-like species that arrived about 13 million years ago, when Gardner Pinnacles and French Frigate Shoals were high islands and long before the current main islands existed. A molecular phylogenetic study published in 2021 found that Delissea plus Brighamia, Trematolobelia, Lobelia sect. Galeatella, and Lobelia sect. Revolutella formed a clade that was closely related to giant African and South American lobelioids. Clermontia formed a separate clade with some species of Cyanea, which was not monophyletic. The part of their cladogram that includes genera and sections from Hawaii is shown below, with added shading to show those treated as Hawaiian lobelioids, which do not form a single clade in this study.

- - - Some species of Lobelia sect. Rhynchopetalum (from Africa and South America)
    - - Delissea + Brighamia
      - - Lobelia sect. Revolutella
        - - Lobelia sect. Galeatella
          - Trematolobelia
  - - Sclerotheca + Apetahia (from other Pacific islands)
    - - Some species of Cyanea
      - Clermontia

The authors of the 2021 study described the taxonomy of several genera, including Lobelia, as "particularly frustrating" and called for further research.

== Brighamia ==
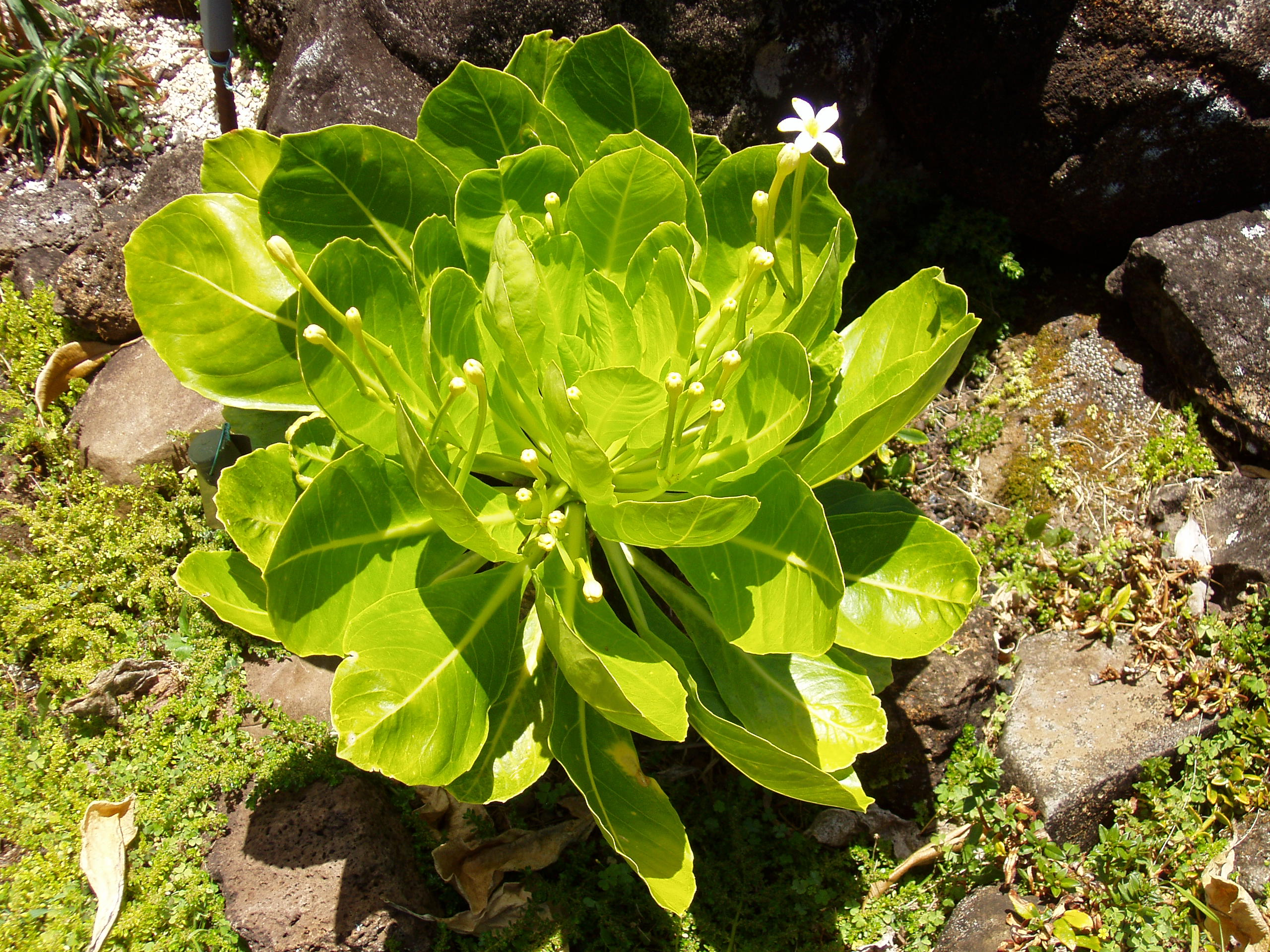
Brighamia insignis, dense cluster of broad leaves with elongate white flowers.

Brighamia is quite unlike the other genera, with a succulent stem and long, thin, tubular flowers. It was long thought to have been the result of a separate introduction, and its unique combination of characters made it difficult to place. These characters are the result of adaptation to growing on cliffs and pollination by the endemic Hawaiian hawkmoth, Manduca blackburni. This moth is now itself listed as endangered, surviving mainly on the southern slopes of Maui, well away from where Brighamia live. Some pollination may be done by closely related alien hawkmoths such as the five-spotted hawkmoth (M. quinquemaculata) and pink-spotted hawkmoth (Agrius cingulata). Despite their inaccessible habitat on cliffs, Brighamia are sometimes hand-pollinated by botanists to ensure seed set. Both species are now extremely rare in the wild, but B. insignis enjoys some small scale popularity as a house plant. The genus is named in honour of the first director of the Bernice P. Bishop Museum, William Tufts Brigham.

Brighamia species

- Brighamia insignis* A.Gray – ʻŌlulu (Kauaʻi, Niʻihau†)
- Brighamia rockii* H.St.John – Pua ʻAla (Molokaʻi, Lānaʻi†, Maui†)

† species believed to be extinct
* species is listed as endangered

== Lobelia ==
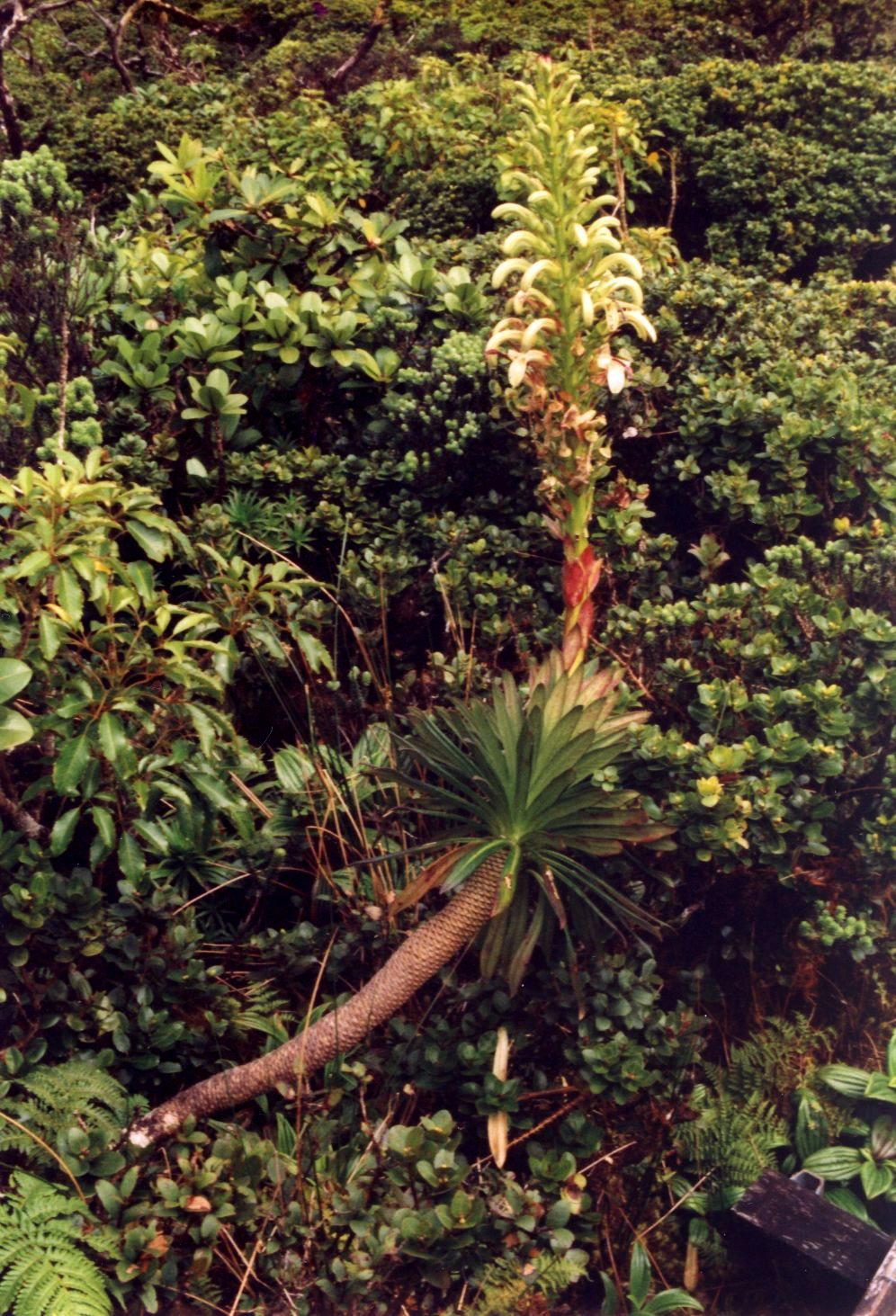
Lobelia gloria-montis from Puʻu Kukui bog, West Maui.

Lobelia is a cosmopolitan genus of over 350 species, including common ornamentals. However, many lobelioid genera are derived from it and it is highly paraphyletic. The Hawaiian species are divided into two sections (Galeatella, the giant lobelias of montane bogs, and Revolutella, the smaller lobelias of rocky crests and interior rock walls), based on flower color and other characters. Like Brighamia and Trematolobelia, the fruit of Lobelia is a dry capsule. These species are probably the closest in appearance to the original Hawaiian colonist.

Lobelia species

- section Galeatella: flowers red or yellow to white
  - Lobelia gaudichaudii* A.DC (Oʻahu)
  - Lobelia gloria-montis Rock (Maui, Molokaʻi?)
  - Lobelia kauaensis (A.Gray) A. Heller - Puʻe (Kauaʻi)
  - Lobelia villosa (Rock) H.St.John & Hosaka (Kauaʻi)
- section Revolutella: flowers blue or magenta
  - Lobelia dunbarii Rock (Molokaʻi)
  - Lobelia grayana F.Wimmer (Maui)
  - Lobelia hillebrandii Rock (Maui)
  - Lobelia hypoleuca Hillebr. – Kuhiʻaikamoʻowahie (Kauaʻi, Oʻahu, Molokaʻi, Lānaʻi, Maui, Hawaiʻi)
  - Lobelia monostachya* (Rock) Lammers (Oʻahu)
  - Lobelia niihauensis* H.St.John (Niʻihau†, Kauaʻi, Oʻahu)
  - Lobelia oahuensis* Rock (Oʻahu)
  - Lobelia remyi Rock (Oʻahu†)
  - Lobelia yuccoides Hillebr. - Pānaunau (Kauaʻi, Oʻahu)

† species believed to be extinct
* species is listed Endangered

== Trematolobelia ==
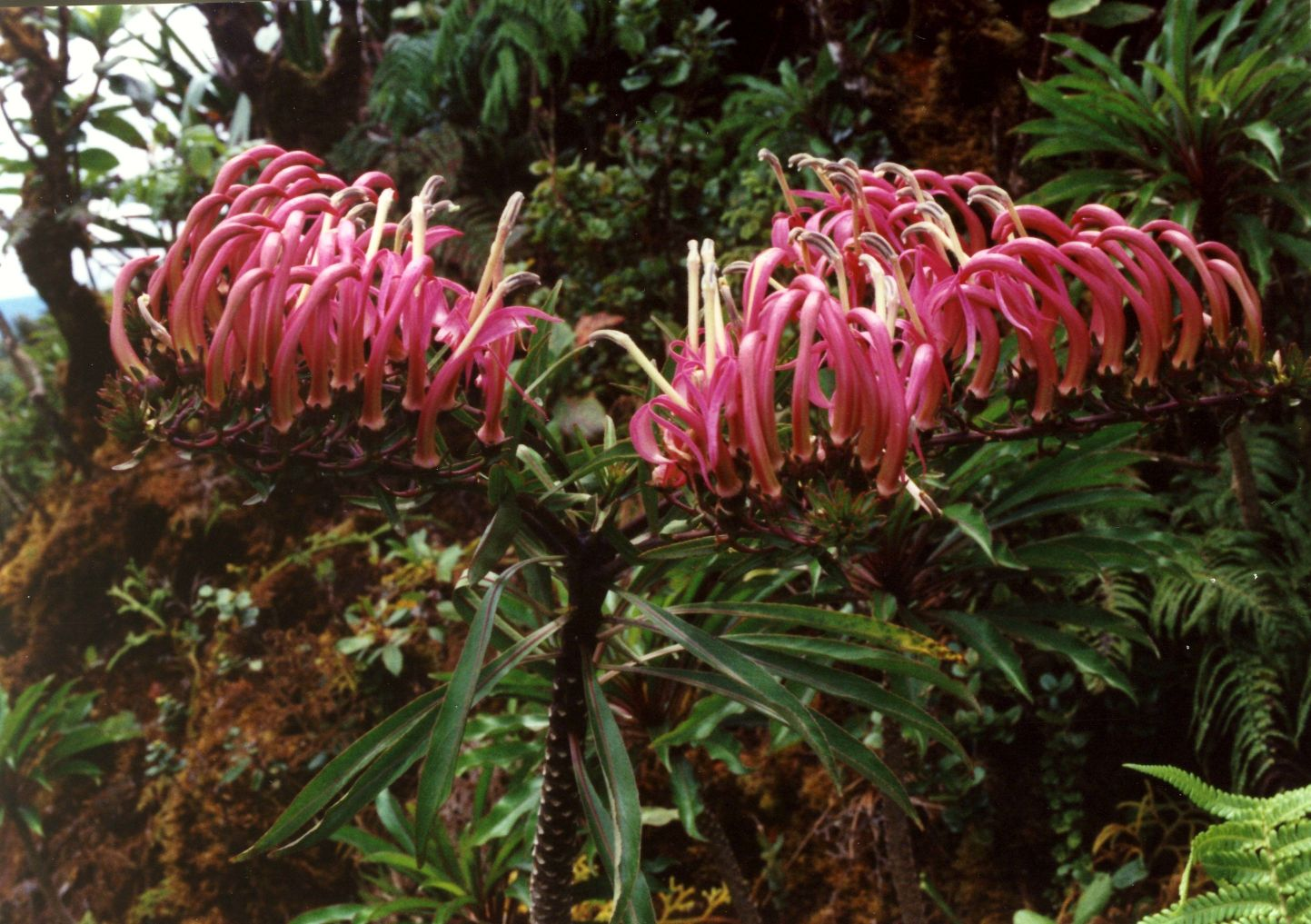
Trematolobelia macrostachys on Mount Kaʻala, Oʻahu.

Trematolobelia is distinguished from Lobelia by its unique dispersal method. Rather than drying and splitting apart, the outer (green) wall of the fruit disintegrates, revealing a perforated hard "frame" that allows the tiny wind-dispersed seeds to escape. They can be quite spectacular when in flower, with multiple flower branches and hundreds of flowers. Individual plants live for 5–10 years before flowering and dying.

Trematobelia species

- Trematolobelia grandifolia Rock (Hawaiʻi)
- Trematolobelia kauaiensis Rock – Koliʻi (Kauaʻi)
- Trematolobelia macrostachys (Hook. & Arn.) A. Zahlbr. – Koliʻi (Oʻahu, Molokaʻi†, Lānaʻi†, Maui, Hawaiʻi†)
- Trematolobelia singularis* H.St.John (Oʻahu)

† species believed to be extinct
* species is listed Endangered

== Clermontia ==
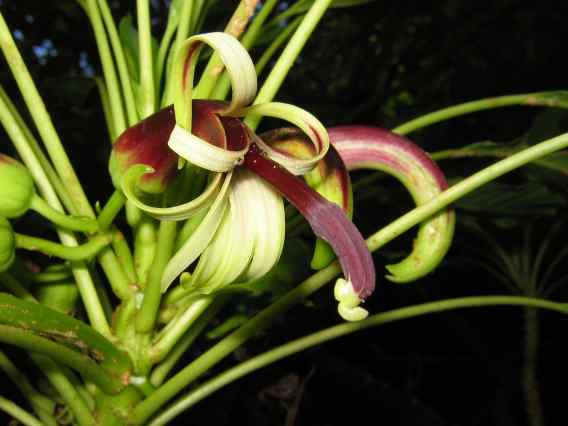
Clermontia pallida, showing the "double flower" of section Clermontia.

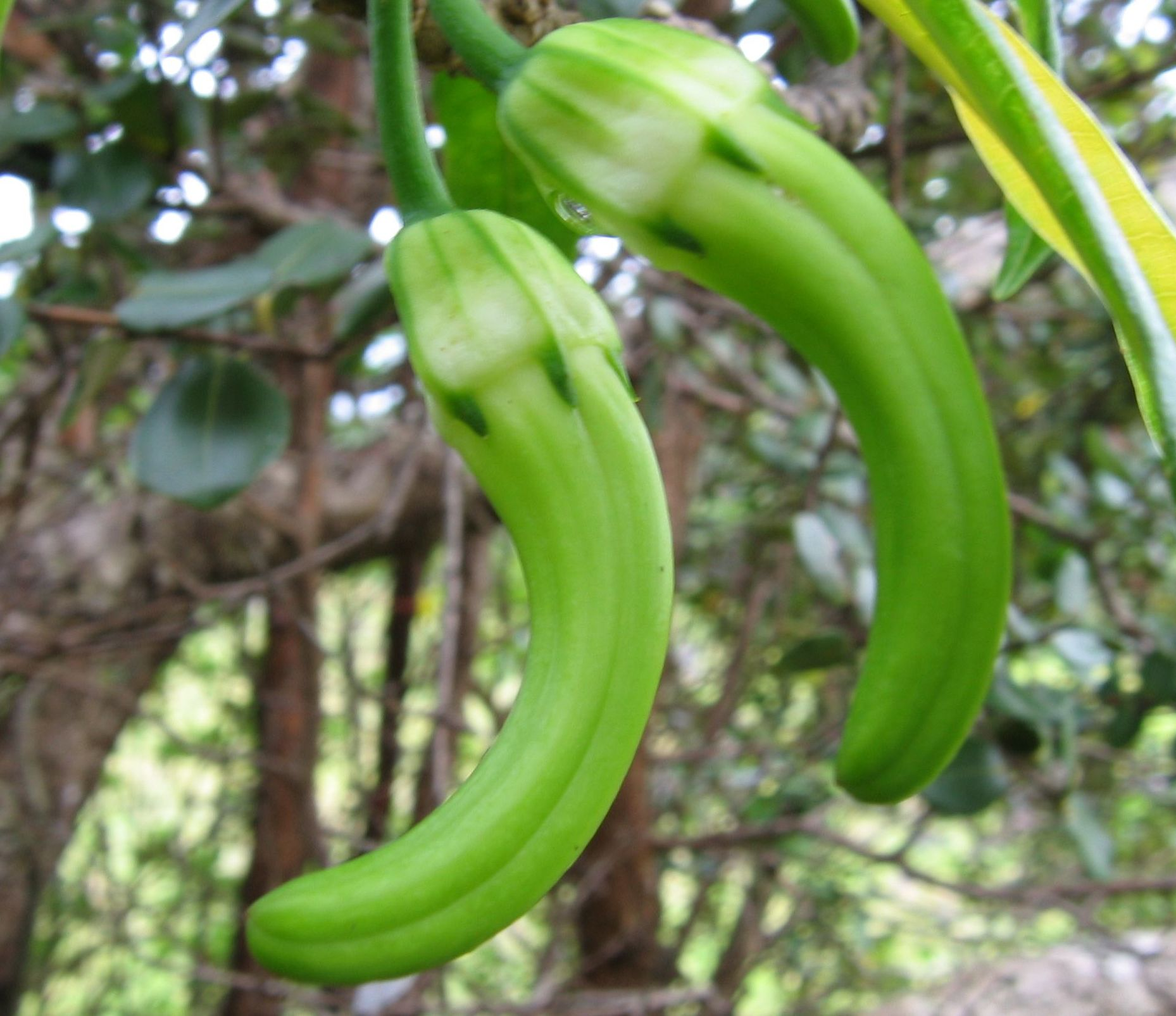
Clermontia clermontioides, showing the tiny calyx lobes of section Clermontioideae (dark green).

Clermontia, with 22 species, are the most common of Hawaiian lobelioids. Unlike Cyanea, which are typically found in dense forest, Clermontia are frequently found in more open areas and edges, and therefore persist better when forests become fragmented. Nevertheless, there are still many endangered species. The flowers are often large and spectacular; in section Clermontia, the calyx lobes are similar in color and size to the corolla, giving the appearance of a flower with twice the normal number of petals.

Clermontia is a very important host plant for many species of Hawaiian Drosophilidae, such as Drosophila silvestris. The larvae of Drosophilidae flies breed in the rotting bark, leaves, flowers, and fruit of all lobelioids, but primarily Clermontia since it is largest and most common. Several species of these native plants, especially on the Big Island, are epiphytic.

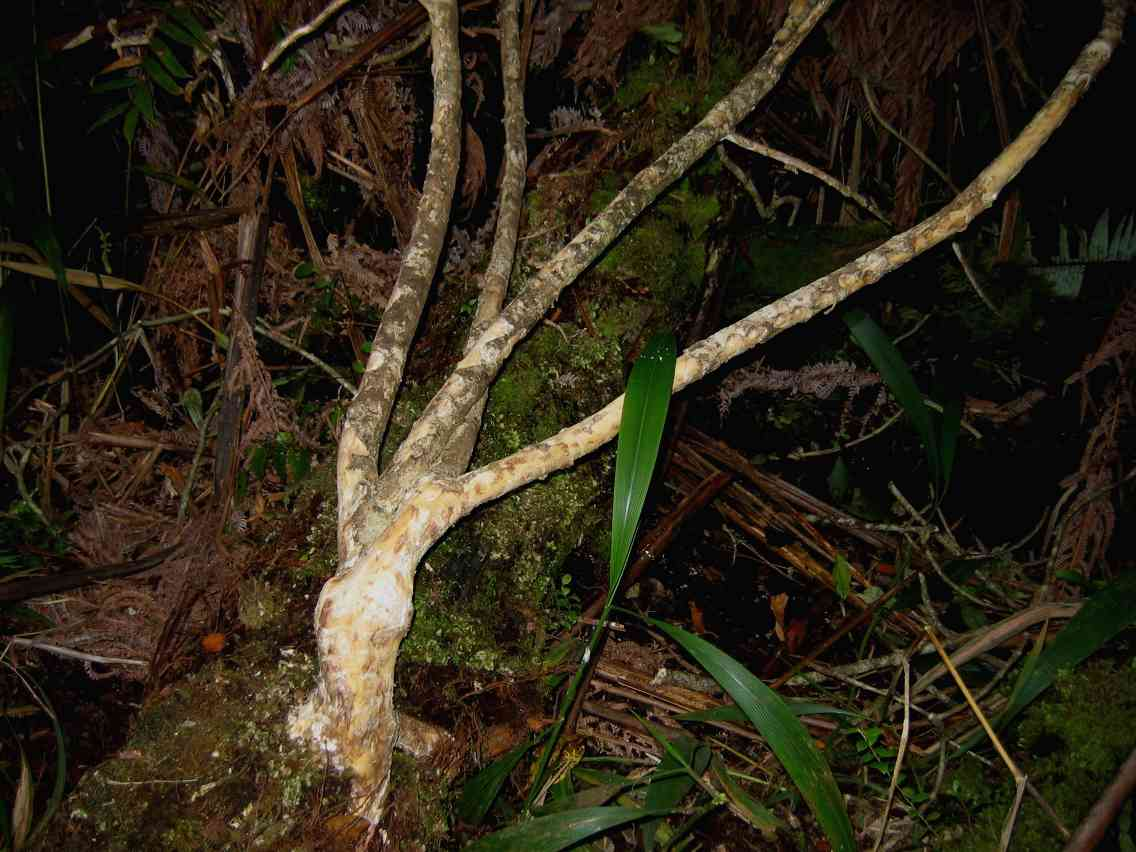
Rat damage on Clermontia.

Clermontia species

- section Clermontia: calyx lobes similar to petals
  - Clermontia calophylla* F.Wimmer - ʻŌhā wai nui (Kohala, Hawaiʻi)
  - Clermontia drepanomorpha* Rock - ʻŌhā wai (Kohala, Hawaiʻi)
  - Clermontia grandiflora† Gaudich. - ʻŌhā wai (Molokaʻi, Lānaʻi, Maui)
  - Clermontia hawaiiensis (Hillebr.) Rock - ʻŌhā kēpau (Puna and Kaʻū on Hawaiʻi)
  - Clermontia hanaulaensis* - ʻŌhā wai (west Maui)
  - Clermontia kakeana Meyen - ʻŌhā wai (Oʻahu, Molokaʻi, Maui)
  - Clermontia kohalae Rock - ʻŌhā wai (Kohala and Hāmākua on Hawaiʻi)
  - Clermontia lindseyana* Rock - ʻŌhā wai (Hawaiʻi, east Maui)
  - Clermontia micrantha (Hillebr.) Rock - ʻŌhā wai (Lānaʻi, west Maui)
  - Clermontia montis-loa Rock - ʻŌhā wai (Hilo, Puna, and Kaʻū on Hawaiʻi)
  - Clermontia multiflora Hillebr. - ʻŌhā wai (Oʻahu†, west Maui†)
  - Clermontia oblongifolia* Gaudich. - ʻŌhā wai (Oʻahu, Molokaʻi, Lānaʻi, Maui)
  - Clermontia pallida Hillebr. - ʻŌhā wai (Molokaʻi)
  - Clermontia parviflora Gaudich. ex A.Gray - ʻŌhā wai (windward Hawaiʻi)
  - Clermontia persicifolia Gaudich. - ʻŌhā wai (Oʻahu)
  - Clermontia samuelii* F.B.Forbes - ʻŌhā wai (east Maui)
- section Clermontioideae: calyx lobes short, green
  - Clermontia arborescens (H.Mann) Hillebr. - ʻŌhā wai nui (Molokaʻi, Lānaʻi, Maui)
  - Clermontia clermontioides (Gaudich.) A.Heller (Kaʻū and Kona Districts on Hawaiʻi)
  - Clermontia fauriei H.Lév - Hāhāʻaiakamanu (Kauaʻi, Oʻahu)
  - Clermontia peleana* Rock (Hawaiʻi, Maui?)
  - Clermontia pyrularia* - ʻŌhā wai (Hawaiʻi)
  - Clermontia tuberculata* - ʻŌhā wai (Maui)
  - Clermontia waimeae* - ʻŌhā wai (Hawaiʻi)

† species believed to be extinct
* species is listed Endangered

== Cyanea ==
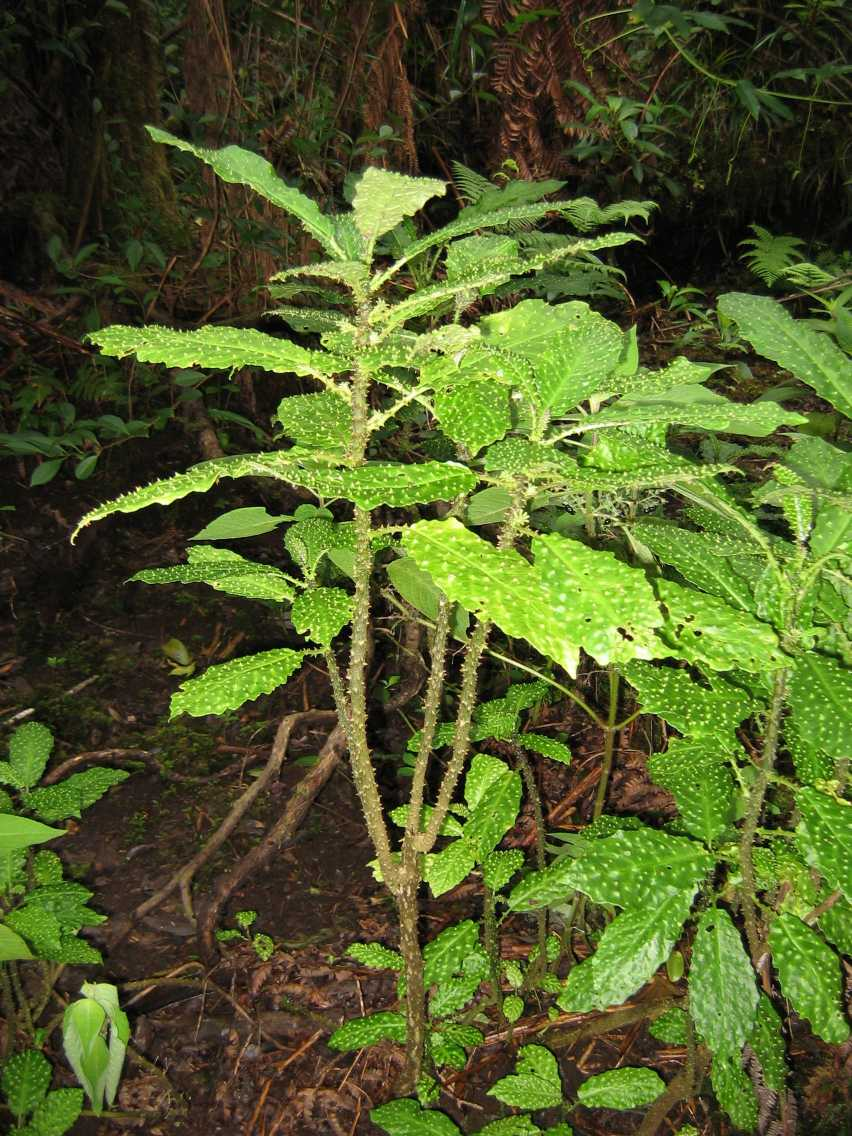
Cyanea platyphylla, one of the species with abundant spines.

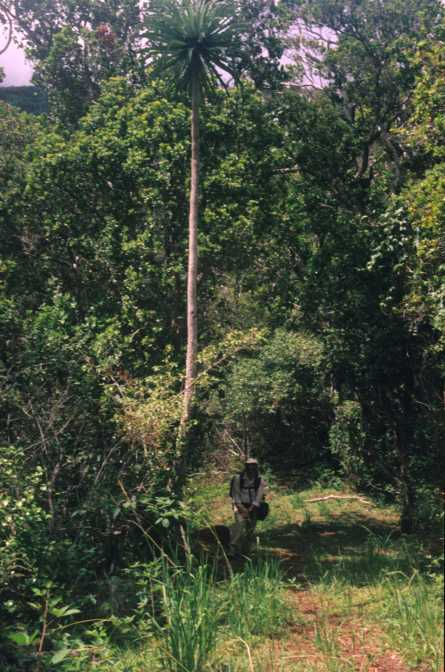
Cyanea leptostegia, one of the largest species.

Cyanea is the largest and most morphologically diverse group of Hawaiian lobelioids, with more than 70 species. Most grow as a single stem or as a cluster branching near the ground, but a few, such as C. stictophylla, grow as multi-branched shrubs. Some, such as C. leptostegia of Kauaʻi, can grow to over 9 metres (30 ft) tall - something that is especially notable given the relative thinness of the stem and soft wood.

Part of the reason Cyanea are able to grow tall stalks is that they tend to grow in deep forest, often in narrow gulches on the older islands, where there is little wind. This characteristic of growing under dense cover also makes them more sensitive to disturbance of the forest.

An interesting character of many Cyanea is their tendency to grow spines or thorns on the stem and leaves (see the photo of Cyanea platyphylla). This is most pronounced in younger plants, and some species undergo a kind of metamorphosis as they mature, to the extent that different growth stages were described as separate species, due in part to the presence or absence of spines. The purpose of the spines was puzzling, since in most island situations there is a tendency for plants to lose defenses - Hawaiʻi is noted for its nettle-less nettles, mintless mints, and (not quite) thornless raspberries - and no native browsing animals were known. However, it is now believed that the spines were a defense against the moa-nalo, giant browsing geese and goose-like ducks that formerly inhabited the islands (Givnish et al. 1995). These birds were apparently driven extinct by the Hawaiians before Europeans reached the islands, but their evolutionary effects live on.

Many species are now extinct or have not been seen in decades. These include C. arborea, C. comata, and C. pohaku, a cluster of species that formerly inhabited the drier, mesic areas of leeward East Maui where almost no native habitat remains. Because they are particularly sensitive to disturbance by pigs, Cyanea are often the first plants to disappear, even when the forest as a whole appears relatively healthy. Extinct species tended to have longer, more highly specialized flowers and to have narrower elevational and geographic ranges than the species that survived (Givnish et al. 1995).

Species of Cyanea on each major island tend to differ in flower tube length and mean elevation, apparently reflecting a partitioning of ecological and reproductive resources. The total number of species of Cyanea can be predicted rather precisely from the height and area of each of the major islands except Hawaiʻi (the Big Island), suggesting that the assembly of Cyanea communities requires more than 0.6 million years (the age of Hawaii) and less than 1.5 million years (the age of Maui) to run to ecological saturation (Givnish et al. 2008).

Cyanea species

- Cyanea aculeatiflora Rock (east Maui)
- Cyanea acuminata* (Gaudich.) Hillebr. (Oʻahu)
- Cyanea angustifolia* (Cham.) Hillebr. (Oʻahu, Molokaʻi, Lānaʻi, Maui)
- Cyanea arborea Hillebr. (east Maui†)
- Cyanea asarifolia* H.St.John (Kauaʻi)
- Cyanea asplenifolia* (H.Mann) Hillebr. (Maui)
- Cyanea calycina* Lammers (Oʻahu)
- Cyanea comata Hillebr. (east Maui†)
- Cyanea copelandii* Rock (east Maui, Hawaiʻi)
- Cyanea coriacea (A.Gray) Hillebr. (Kauaʻi)
- Cyanea crispa* Gaudich. (Oʻahu)
- Cyanea degeneriana F. Wimmer (Hawaiʻi)
- Cyanea dolichopoda Lammers & Lorence (Kauaʻi†)
- Cyanea dunbariae* Rock - Molokaʻi†)
- Cyanea eleeleensis (H.St.John) Lammers (Kauaʻi†)
- Cyanea elliptica (Rock) Lammers (Lānaʻi, Maui)
- Cyanea fauriei H.Lév (Kauaʻi)
- Cyanea fissa (H.Mann) Hillebr. (Kauaʻi)
- Cyanea giffardii Rock (Hawaiʻi†)
- Cyanea glabra* (F.Wimmer) H.St.John (Maui†)
- Cyanea grimesiana* Gaudich. (Oʻahu, Molokaʻi, Lānaʻi, Maui, Hawaiʻi†)
- Cyanea habenata (H.St.John) Lammers (Kauaʻi)
- Cyanea hamatiflora* Rock (east Maui, Hawaiʻi)
- Cyanea hardyi Rock (Kauaʻi)
- Cyanea hirtella (H.Mann) Hillebr. (Kauaʻi)
- Cyanea horrida (Rock) O.Deg. & Hosaka - Hāhā nui (east Maui)
- Cyanea humboldtiana* Gaudich. (Oʻahu)
- Cyanea kahiliensis (H.St.John) Lammers (Kauaʻi)
- Cyanea kolekoleensis (H.St.John) Lammers (Kauaʻi)
- Cyanea koolauensis* Lammers Givnish & Sytsma (new name for Rollandia angustifolia) (Oʻahu)
- Cyanea kunthiana Hillebr. (Maui)
- Cyanea lanceolata Gaudich. (Oʻahu)
- Cyanea leptostegia A.Gray - Hāhā lua (Kauaʻi)
- Cyanea linearifolia Rock (Kauaʻi†)
- Cyanea lobata* H.Mann (Lānaʻi, west Maui)
- Cyanea longissima (Rock) H.St.John (east Maui†)
- Cyanea longiflora* Wawra (Oʻahu)
- Cyanea macrostegia* Hillebr. (Lānaʻi, Maui)
- Cyanea mannii* (Brigham) Hillebr. (Molokaʻi)
- Cyanea marksii Rock (Kona, Hawaiʻi)
- Cyanea mceldowneyi* Rock (east Maui)
- Cyanea membranacea Rock (Oʻahu)
- Cyanea obtusa (A.Gray) Hillebr. (Maui†)
- Cyanea parvifolia C.N.Forbes (Kauaʻi†)
- Cyanea pilosa A.Gray (Hawaiʻi)
- Cyanea pinnatifida* (Cham.) F.Wimmer (Oʻahu)
- Cyanea platyphylla* (A.Gray) Hillebr. - ʻAkūʻakū (Hawaiʻi)
- Cyanea pohaku Lammers (east Maui†)
- Cyanea procera* Hillebr. (Molokaʻi†)
- Cyanea profuga C.N.Forbes (Molokaʻi†)
- Cyanea purpurellifolia Rock (Oʻahu)
- Cyanea pycnocarpa (Hillebr.) F.Wimmer (Hawaiʻi†)
- Cyanea quercifolia (Hillebr.) F.Wimmer (east Maui†)
- Cyanea recta* (Wawra) Hillebr. (Kauaʻi†)
- Cyanea rivularis* (Rock) (Kauaʻi†)
- Cyanea scabra Hillebr. (west Maui)
- Cyanea shipmanii* Rock (Hawaiʻi)
- Cyanea solenacea Hillebr. - Pōpolo (Molokaʻi)
- Cyanea solenocalyx Hillebr. - Pua kala (Molokaʻi)
- Cyanea spathulata (Hillebr.) A.Heller (Kauaʻi)
- Cyanea st.-johnii* Hosaka (Oʻahu)
- Cyanea stictophylla* Rock (Kona and Kaʻū on Hawaiʻi)
- Cyanea superba* (Cham.) A.Gray (Oʻahu)
- Cyanea sylvestris A.Heller (Kauaʻi)
- Cyanea tritomantha A.Gray - ʻAkūʻakū (Hawaiʻi)
- Cyanea truncata* (Rock) Rock (Oʻahu)
- Cyanea undulata* C.N.Forbes (Kauaʻi†)
- Cyanea leptostegia* A.Gray - hanaʻlau (Kauaʻi)

† species believed to be extinct
* species is listed Endangered

== Delissea ==
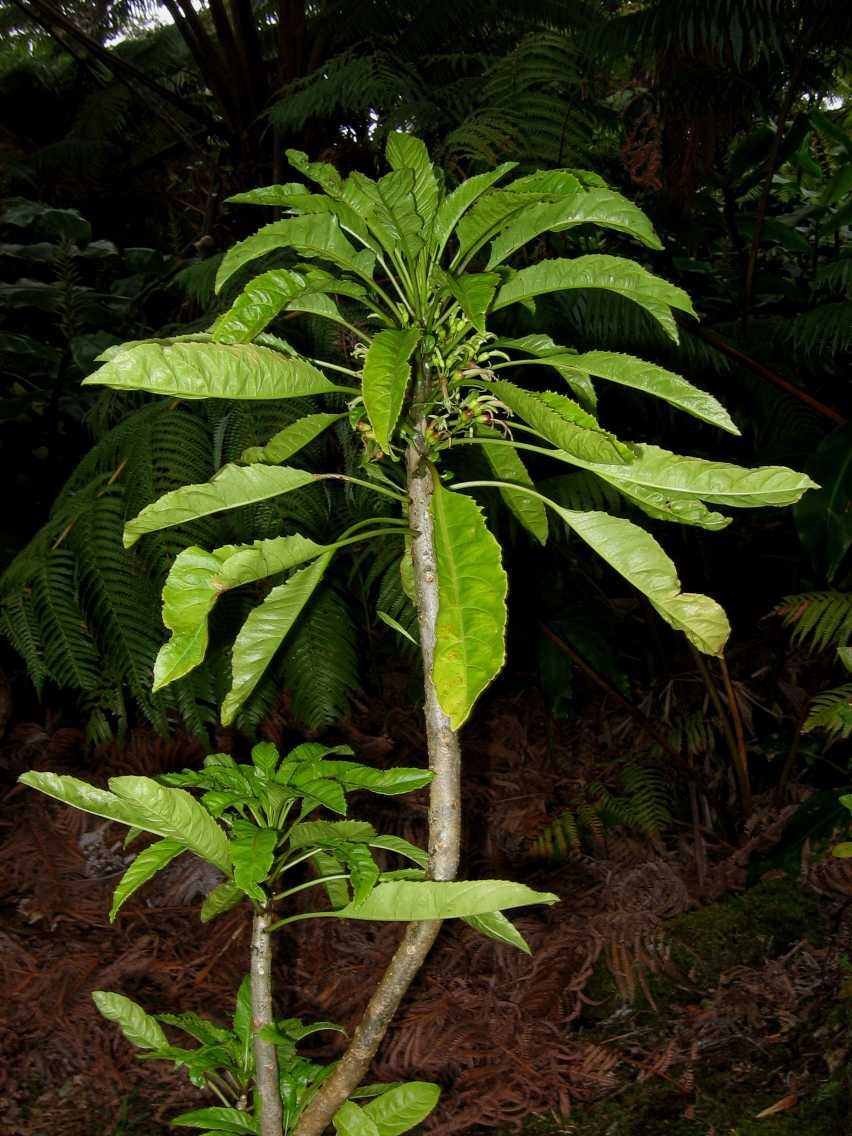
Delissea rhytidosperma

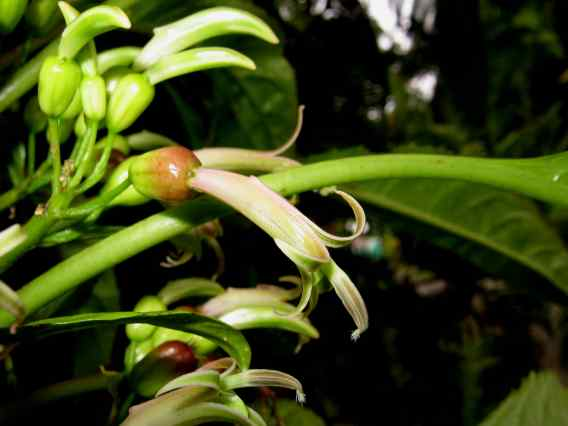
Delissea rhytidosperma of Kauaʻi. Note the small knob about 1/3 of the way down the flower, one of the characters separating Delissea from Cyanea.

Delissea is similar to Cyanea in many ways, differing primarily in the flower (with a small knob on the dorsal side) and fruit (dark purple; most Cyanea fruit are orange, though some are also purple or blue). It is notable in part due to its dwindling populations: only three of the nine species known to science are still extant, and one of these (D. undulata) is extinct in the wild. Several species are known only from type specimens collected in the late 1800s. Several species are very poorly known, and their status as species is questionable. For example, D. fallax and D. parviflora are both from Hawaiʻi and their flowers are identical; it is possible that they represent different growth forms of the same species (both Delissea and Cyanea are known to undergo changes in vegetative morphology during the lifetime of the plant). Delissea lauliiana was known only from the type, which was destroyed in Berlin during World War II. All three of these are believed to be extinct.

Delissea species

- section Delissea: nearly straight flowers 14–26 millimetres (0.55–1.02 in) long
  - Delissea argutidentata (E.Wimm.) H.St.John
  - Delissea fallax Hillebr. (Hawaiʻi†)
  - Delissea kauaiensis (Lammers) Lammers (Kauaʻi)
  - Delissea lauliiana Lammers (Oʻahu†)
  - Delissea parviflora Hillebr. (Hawaiʻi†)
  - Delissea rhytidosperma* H.Mann (Kauaʻi)
  - Delissea undulata* Gaudich. (Niʻihau†, Kauaʻi†, Maui†, Hawaiʻi)
- section Macranthae: curved flowers 37–60 millimetres (1.5–2.4 in) long
  - Delissea laciniata Hillebr (Oʻahu†)
  - Delissea sinuata Hillebr. (Oʻahu†, Lānaʻi†)
  - Delissea subcordata† Gaudich. (Oʻahu)
  - Delissea waianaeensis* Lammers (Oʻahu)

† species believed to be extinct
* species is listed Endangered
