= Leechleaf delissea =

Leechleaf delissea is a common name for several plants and may refer to:

- Delissea rhytidosperma
- Delissea undulata
