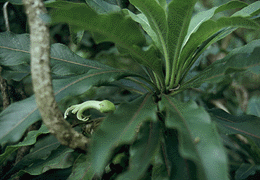

Conservation status
- Critically Endangered (IUCN 3.1)

Scientific classification
- Kingdom: Plantae
- Clade: Embryophytes
- Clade: Tracheophytes
- Clade: Spermatophytes
- Clade: Angiosperms
- Clade: Eudicots
- Clade: Asterids
- Order: Asterales
- Family: Campanulaceae
- Genus: Clermontia
- Species: C. pyrularia

Binomial name
- Clermontia pyrularia Hillebr.

= Clermontia pyrularia =

Species of plant

Clermontia pyrularia is a rare species of flowering plant in the bellflower family known by the common names Hamakua clermontia and pear clermontia. It is one of several Hawaiian lobelioids in genus Clermontia that are known as ʻoha wai and haha. It is endemic to the island of Hawaiʻi, where there is one remaining wild population containing 15 individuals and several propagated individuals that have been planted in protected habitat. This is a federally listed endangered species of the United States.

This is a small tree which grows in Metrosideros polymorpha and Acacia koa dominated montane wet and subalpine dry forests on the slopes of Mauna Loa and Mauna Kea between 3,000 and 7,000 ft (910 and 2,130 m). Associated plants include Lythrum maritimum and Rubus hawaiensis. It has toothed leaf blades borne on winged petioles. The plant blooms in November and December in greenish white double-lipped flowers with green-tipped sepals. Pear-shaped fruits occur soon after.

Threats to this rare plant include feral pigs, black rats, and introduced plant species such as banana passionfruit (Passiflora mollissima), weeping rice grass (Ehrharta stipoides), and kikuyu grass (Pennisetum clandestinum). The plant also likely suffers from the loss of several native nectar-feeding birds which once pollinated it, and fruit-eating birds which dispersed its seeds.

A few populations have been planted in Hakalau National Wildlife Refuge.
