= Clermontia oblongifolia =

Scientific classification
- Kingdom: Plantae
- Clade: Tracheophytes
- Clade: Angiosperms
- Clade: Eudicots
- Clade: Asterids
- Order: Asterales
- Family: Campanulaceae
- Genus: Clermontia
- Species: C. oblongifolia

Binomial name
- Clermontia oblongifolia Gaudich.

Subspecies
- C. o. ssp. brevipes C. o. ssp. mauiensis C. o. ssp. oblongifolia

Species of flowering plant

Clermontia oblongifolia is a species of flowering plant in the bellflower family known by the common name Oahu clermontia. It is one of several Hawaiian lobelioids in genus Clermontia that are known as ʻoha wai. This plant is native to three of the Hawaiian Islands, where one subspecies is not uncommon but the other two are very rare and endangered.

The more common subspecies, ssp. oblongifolia, is endemic to Oʻahu, where it grows in rainforests.

The rare subspecies mauiensis is endemic to Maui, where there is only a single plant remaining in the montane wet forests. It has been extirpated from Lānaʻi. This subspecies is federally listed as an endangered species of the United States.

The rare subspecies brevipes is endemic to Molokaʻi, where there are fewer than 30 plants remaining. This subspecies is federally listed as an endangered species of the United States.
