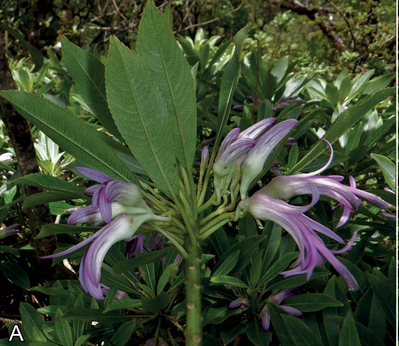

Scientific classification
- Kingdom: Plantae
- Clade: Tracheophytes
- Clade: Angiosperms
- Clade: Eudicots
- Clade: Asterids
- Order: Asterales
- Family: Campanulaceae
- Genus: Clermontia
- Species: C. hanaulaensis

Binomial name
- Clermontia hanaulaensis H.Oppenh., Lorence & W.L.Wagner

= Clermontia hanaulaensis =

Species of flowering plant

Clermontia hanaulaensis is a species of flowering plant in the family Campanulaceae. It is endemic to western Maui in the Hawaiian Islands.
