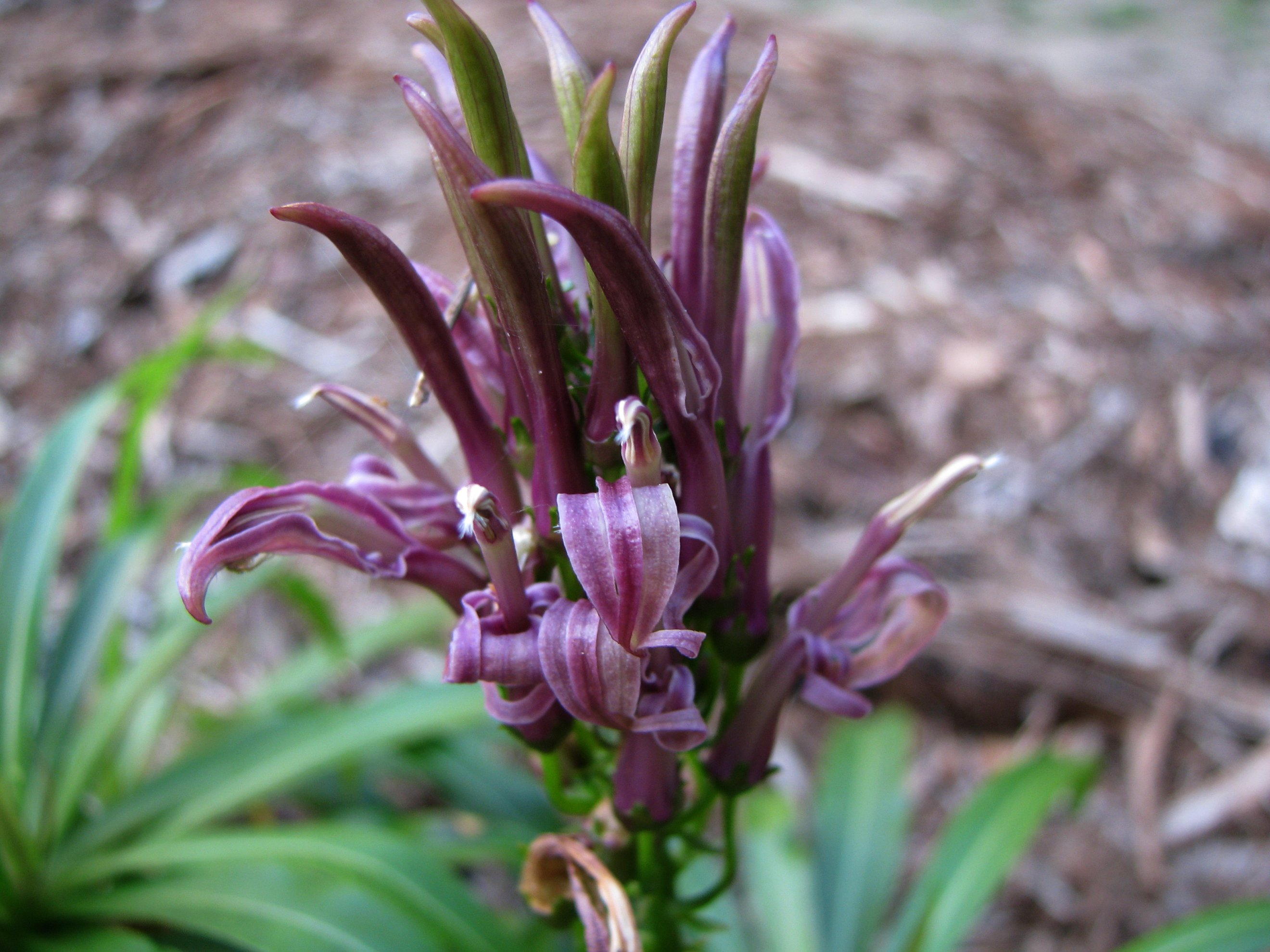

Conservation status
- Endangered (IUCN 3.1)

Scientific classification
- Kingdom: Plantae
- Clade: Tracheophytes
- Clade: Angiosperms
- Clade: Eudicots
- Clade: Asterids
- Order: Asterales
- Family: Campanulaceae
- Genus: Lobelia
- Species: L. niihauensis

Binomial name
- Lobelia niihauensis H.St.John

= Lobelia niihauensis =

Species of plant

Lobelia niihauensis, commonly known as the Niihau lobelia, is a rare species of flowering plant in the bellflower family that is endemic to Hawaii. It is known only from the islands of Oʻahu and Kauaʻi and is thought to be extirpated from Niʻihau. It is federally listed as an endangered species of the United States.

This plant grows only on exposed dry to mesic steep cliffs from 125 to 725 m. Predation, probably by goats, may have eliminated it from any other type of habitat. It produces long terminal inflorescences of magenta flowers.
