= Clermontia drepanomorpha =

Conservation status
- Endangered (IUCN 3.1)

Scientific classification
- Kingdom: Plantae
- Clade: Tracheophytes
- Clade: Angiosperms
- Clade: Eudicots
- Clade: Asterids
- Order: Asterales
- Family: Campanulaceae
- Genus: Clermontia
- Species: C. drepanomorpha

Binomial name
- Clermontia drepanomorpha Rock

Species of flowering plant

Clermontia drepanomorpha is a rare species of flowering plant in the bellflower family known by the common name Kohala Mountain clermontia. It is one of several Hawaiian lobelioids in genus Clermontia that are known as `oha wai. This plant is endemic to Kohala, a volcano at the northern end of the island of Hawaii. This is a federally listed endangered species of the United States. It is a perennial tree that can be terrestrial or epiphytic and it grows in wet boggy forests.

There are fewer than 250 individuals remaining in the wet forests on the slopes of the volcano. Threats to the species include disturbance by feral pigs, deer, rats, and people, and invasive plant species.
