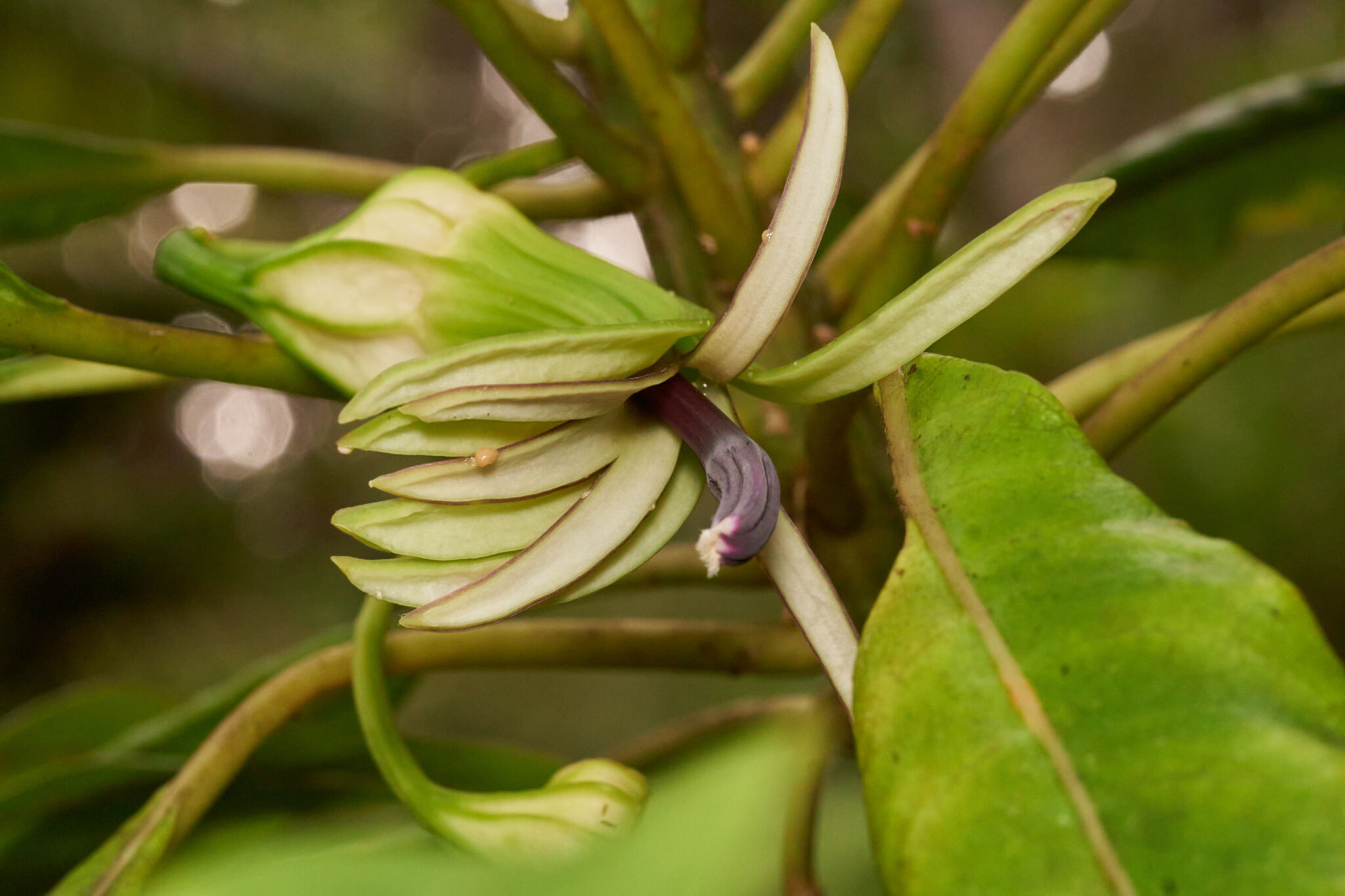
- In flower, Hawaiʻi Volcanoes National Park, elevation 1200m

Conservation status
- Vulnerable (IUCN 2.3)

Scientific classification
- Kingdom: Plantae
- Clade: Tracheophytes
- Clade: Angiosperms
- Clade: Eudicots
- Clade: Asterids
- Order: Asterales
- Family: Campanulaceae
- Genus: Clermontia
- Species: C. hawaiiensis

Binomial name
- Clermontia hawaiiensis Hillebr. (1913)

= Clermontia hawaiiensis =

Species of flowering plant

Clermontia hawaiiensis, the ʻŌhā kēpau, is a species of Hawaiian lobelioid endemic to Hawaiʻi island, where it grows in Hawaiian tropical rainforests. Like other Hawaiian lobelioids, it is highly susceptible to damage from invasive grazing mammals such as feral pigs.

== Description ==
Clermontia hawaiiensis grows as a small tree, usually a few meters in height but potentially reaching up to 9 m (30 ft). It has leaves that grow up to 24 cm (9.4 in), white and purple flowers, and orange fruits approximately 30 mm (1.2 in) across.

=== Flower ===
The flowers grow in an inflorescence grouping of 2-4. They are bisexual and have bilaterally symmetric with the sepals mimicking the shape and texture of the tubular petals. The 5–6.5 cm (2.0–2.6 in) perianth displays colors of greenish white, purples, and magentas.

=== Seed and fruit ===
C. hawaiiensis produces a compact and bright orange in color fruit with horizontal ridges. The fruits’ endocarp contains an abundance of seeds.

== Habitat and distribution ==
Clermontia hawaiiensis is endemic to the windward eastern side of Hawaiʻi island, where it grows only in wet rainforests near the town of Volcano, Hawaii and the Kīlauea Caldera between elevations of 550–1,760 m (1,800–5,770 ft). However, Its common in certain portions of the protected Hawaiʻi Volcanoes National Park in present day. Historically documented as far north as the east slopes of Mauna Kea by the Bernice Pauahi Bishop Musesum.

The symbiotic relationships between the endemic Hawaiian honeycreeper, with its long curved beak, and the ʻŌhā kēpau has been impacted by many of the native birds’ extinction. Furthermore, like other Hawaiian labelloids, it is also highly susceptible to damage from invasive grazing mammals, like the feral pig.

== Conservation ==
The ʻŌhā kēpau is listed as a vulnerable endemic species to the Hawaiian Islands.
