= Clermontia lindseyana =

Conservation status
- Critically Imperiled (NatureServe)

Scientific classification
- Kingdom: Plantae
- Clade: Tracheophytes
- Clade: Angiosperms
- Clade: Eudicots
- Clade: Asterids
- Order: Asterales
- Family: Campanulaceae
- Genus: Clermontia
- Species: C. lindseyana

Binomial name
- Clermontia lindseyana Rock

Species of flowering plant

Clermontia lindseyana is a rare species of flowering plant in the bellflower family known by the common name hillside clermontia. It is one of several Hawaiian lobelioids in genus Clermontia that are known as `oha wai. This plant is known only from Haleakalā, a volcano on the island of Maui, and Mauna Loa and Mauna Kea, volcanoes on the island of Hawaii. This is a federally listed endangered species of the United States.

There are ten known total occurrences of the plant and probably fewer than 1000 individuals remaining. Threats to the species include disturbance by domesticated and feral ungulates and rats, deforestation, and invasive plant species.
