= Trematolobelia singularis =

Conservation status
- Critically Endangered (IUCN 3.1)

Scientific classification
- Kingdom: Plantae
- Clade: Tracheophytes
- Clade: Angiosperms
- Clade: Eudicots
- Clade: Asterids
- Order: Asterales
- Family: Campanulaceae
- Genus: Trematolobelia
- Species: T. singularis

Binomial name
- Trematolobelia singularis H.St.John

Species of flowering plant

Trematolobelia singularis, the lavaslope false lobelia, is a rare species of flowering plant in the bellflower family. It is endemic to Hawaii, where it is known only from the Koʻolau Range on the island of Oahu. It is threatened by the degradation of its habitat. It is a federally listed endangered species of the United States.

This Hawaiian lobelioid is a shrub with an unbranched stem growing up to 1.5 meters tall. The leaves are long and narrow, measuring up to 18 centimeters long by 1.8 wide. The tubular flower has violet petals up to 5 centimeters long that flare open at the mouth of the tube. The fruit is a rounded capsule containing seeds which are dispersed on the wind. The plant grows in wet, windy habitat on high ridges in the Koʻolau Mountains.

As of 2009 there were four populations of this plant totalling about 133 mature adults and at least 50 juveniles. Threats to these plants and their habitat include feral pigs, rats, slugs, and human disturbance. They face competition from introduced species of plants such as Koster's curse (Clidemia hirta).
