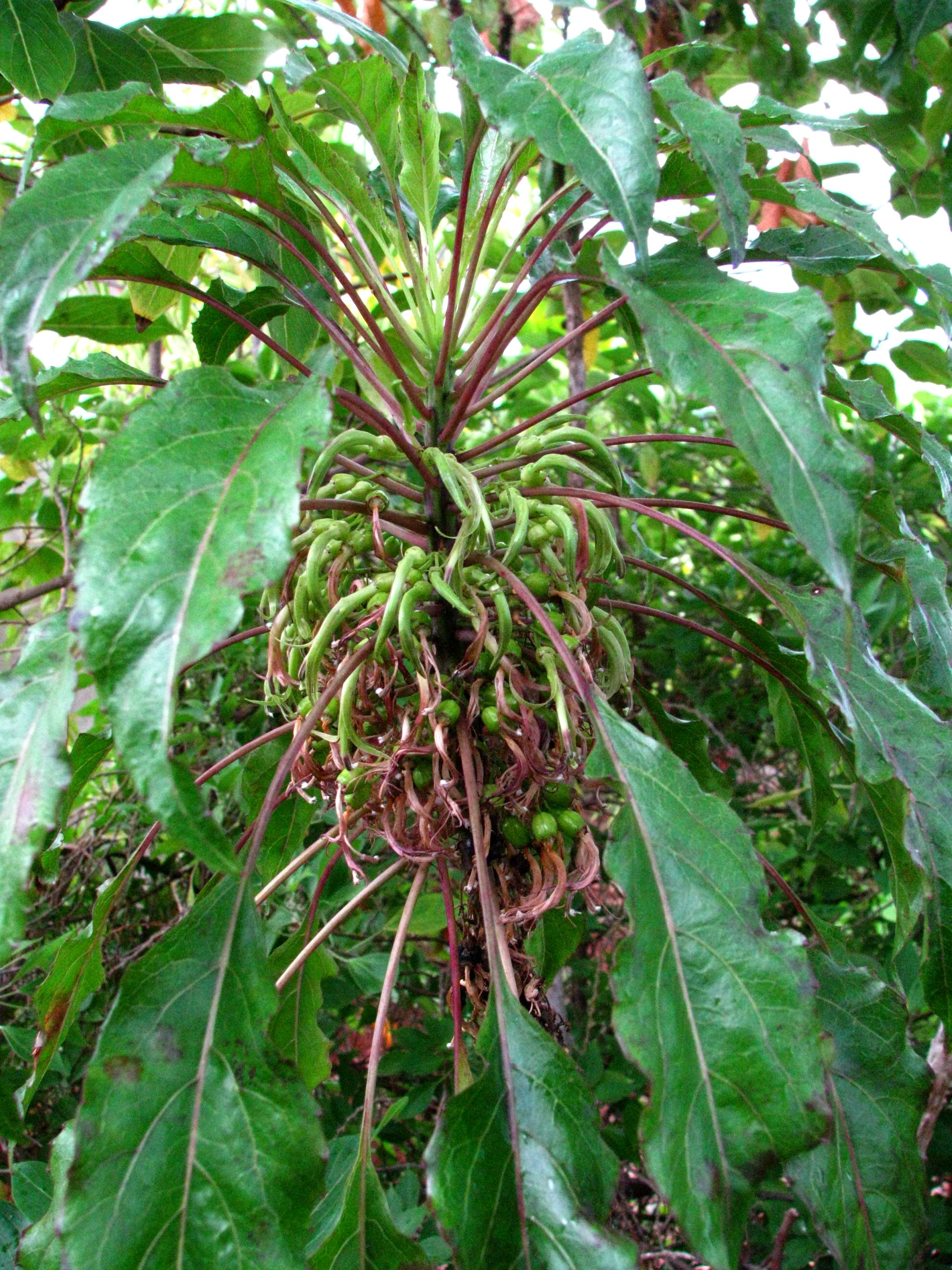

Conservation status
- Critically Endangered (IUCN 3.1)

- Critically Imperiled (NatureServe)

Scientific classification
- Kingdom: Plantae
- Clade: Tracheophytes
- Clade: Angiosperms
- Clade: Eudicots
- Clade: Asterids
- Order: Asterales
- Family: Campanulaceae
- Genus: Delissea
- Species: D. kauaiensis

Binomial name
- Delissea kauaiensis (Lammers) Lammers

= Delissea kauaiensis =

Species of flowering plant

Delissea kauaiensis is a critically endangered species of the bellflower family. It is found on Mt. Ha'upu near Hanapepe Falls, and Mahanaloa. It was thought to be extinct, but 10 individuals were found in 2016. It is known as 'Oha in Hawaiian, and has the English common names of Kauaʻi delissea, Kauaʻi leechleaf delissea, and Leechleaf delissea.

== Description ==
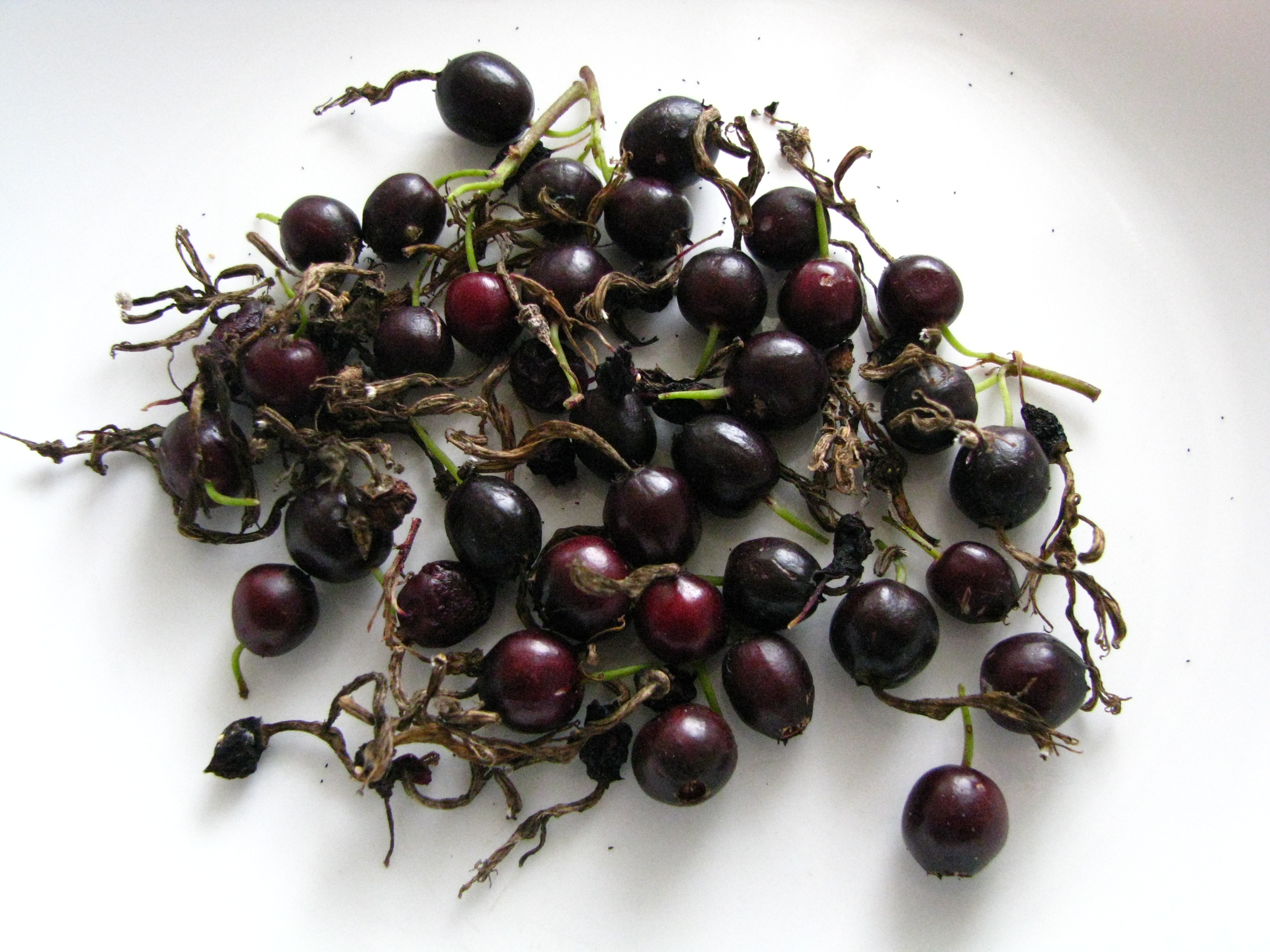
Delissea kauaiensis fruit

The flower color is greenish-white.

The blooming period lasts from June to February, with the flowers reaching their peak during this time. Meanwhile, the fruiting period occurs between October and February, when the fruits begin to develop. The color of the fruit is a rich, dark purple, providing a striking contrast to the foliage. The leaves are typically dark or medium green, often exhibiting a reddish tint, which adds to the plant's vibrant appearance. Unlike its sibling, Delissea rhytidosperma, D. kauaiensis is taller and rarely branches.
