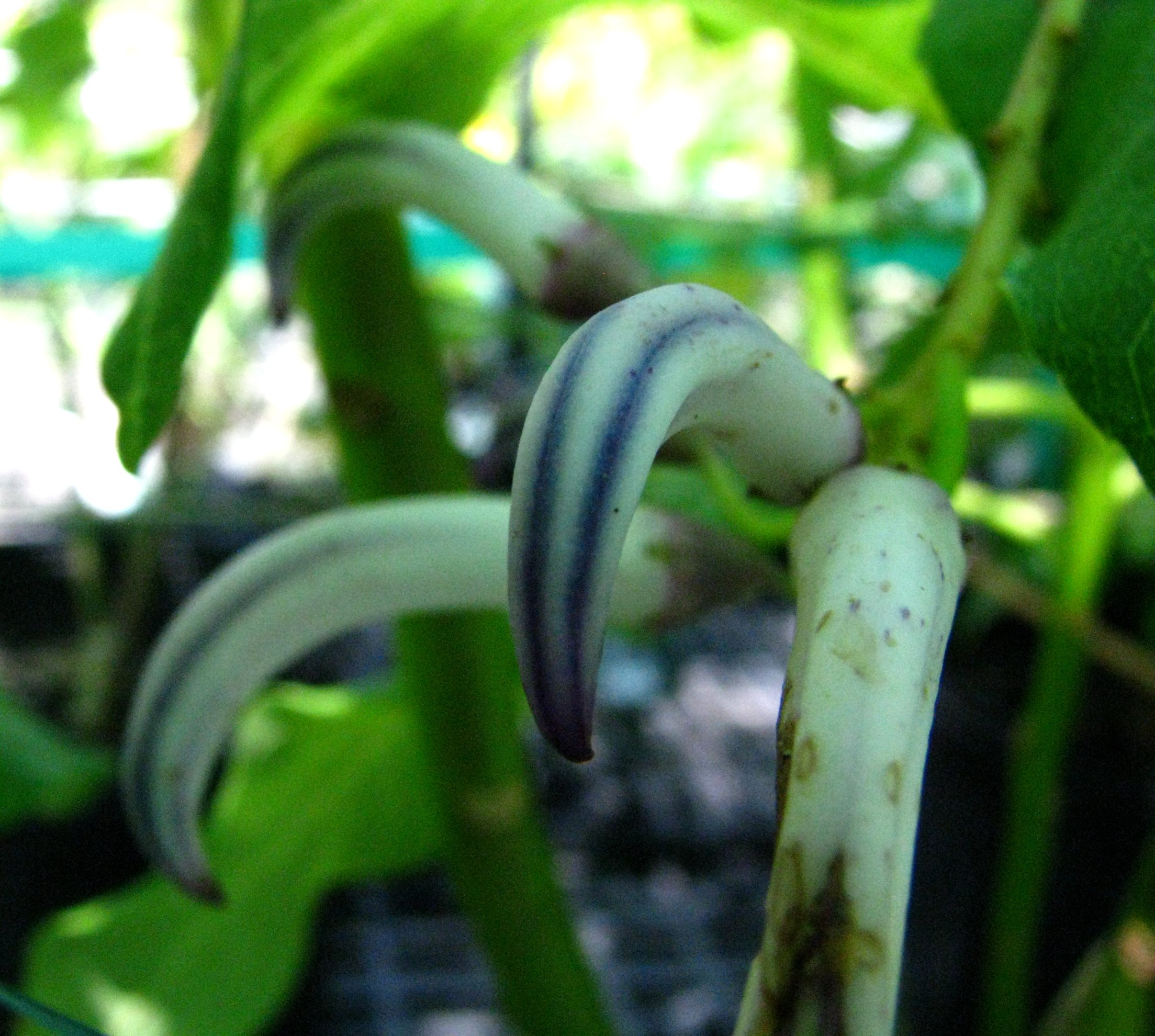

Conservation status
- Critically Imperiled (NatureServe)

Scientific classification
- Kingdom: Plantae
- Clade: Tracheophytes
- Clade: Angiosperms
- Clade: Eudicots
- Clade: Asterids
- Order: Asterales
- Family: Campanulaceae
- Genus: Cyanea
- Species: C. rivularis

Binomial name
- Cyanea rivularis Rock

Synonyms
- Delissea rivularis (Rock) E.Wimm.

= Cyanea rivularis =

Species of flowering plant

Cyanea rivularis (syn. Delissea rivularis) is a rare species of flowering plant in the bellflower family known by the common name plateau cyanea. It is endemic to Hawaii, where it is known only from the island of Kauaʻi. There are three small populations of the plant remaining in the wild, for a total of 19 individual plants. The plant was federally listed as an endangered species of the United States in 1996.

This Hawaiian lobelioid is a shrub growing 4 to 5 meters tall. It bears blue-striped white flowers. It grows in wet forest habitat, generally next to streams, waterfalls, and plunge pools. Other plants in the habitat include ʻōhiʻa lehua (Metrosideros polymorpha) and uluhe (Dicranopteris linearis), which dominate the canopy, and kanawao (Broussaisia arguta), ʻieʻie (Freycinetia arborea) and ʻaiea (Ilex anomala) in the understory.

This ecosystem is threatened by exotic plant species such as Koster's curse (Clidemia hirta), Kahili ginger (Hedychium gardnerianum), and Santa Barbara daisy (Erigeron karvinskianus). Feral ungulates damage the habitat, and rats and slugs damage plants.
