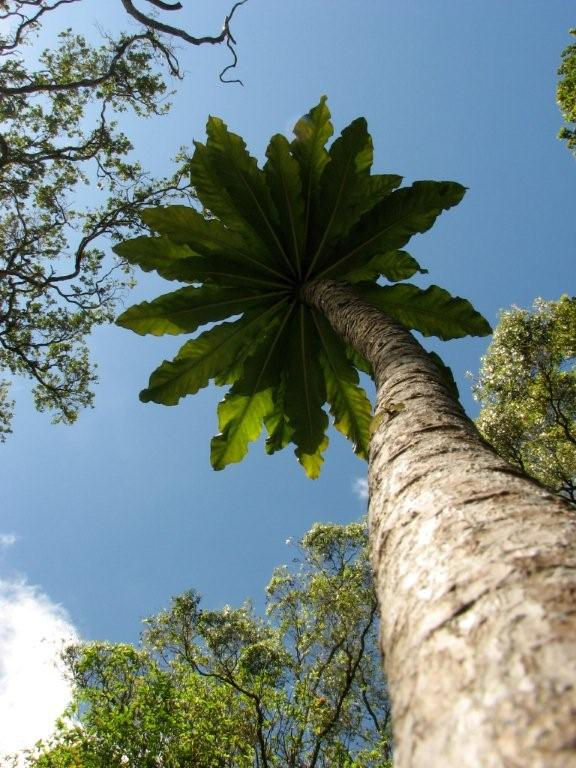

Conservation status
- Extinct in the Wild (IUCN 3.1)

Scientific classification
- Kingdom: Plantae
- Clade: Embryophytes
- Clade: Tracheophytes
- Clade: Angiosperms
- Clade: Eudicots
- Clade: Asterids
- Order: Asterales
- Family: Campanulaceae
- Genus: Cyanea
- Species: C. superba

Binomial name
- Cyanea superba Cham.

= Cyanea superba =

Species of plant

Cyanea superba is a rare species of flowering plant in the bellflower family known by the common names Mt. Kaala cyanea and superb cyanea. It is endemic to the island of Oahu, but it is now extinct in the wild. It exists in cultivation and some individuals have been planted in appropriate habitat. It is a federally listed endangered species of the United States. Like other Cyanea it is known as haha in Hawaiian.

This Hawaiian lobelioid was known from lowland forest habitat in the Waianae and Koʻolau Mountains of Oahu. There were two subspecies. The ssp. regina has not been seen since 1932 and is considered extinct. The subspecies Cyanea superba subsp. superba was collected in the 19th century and then was not seen again until its 1971 rediscovery. In the 1970s there were about 60 plants counted. By the time the plant was listed as endangered in 1991 there were twenty individuals. These slowly disappeared and the last plant died in 2002.

The plant is being propagated in a number of facilities in Hawaii. It has been planted in various parts of the island, often in fenced and otherwise protected areas. Many of the plants have survived, flowered, and produced viable seed, and seedlings have been observed. The U. S. Army has collected over 50,000 seeds from these plants and placed them in storage.

This plant was driven to extinction by a number of forces, chiefly habitat destruction and degradation by feral pigs, rats, and introduced species of slugs. They faced competition from invasive plant species, including kukui (Aleurites moluccanus), silk oak (Grevillea robusta), and Christmas berry (Schinus terebinthifolius). Some factors continue to threaten the individuals that have been planted in the habitat, such as fires started during military exercises and through arson.
