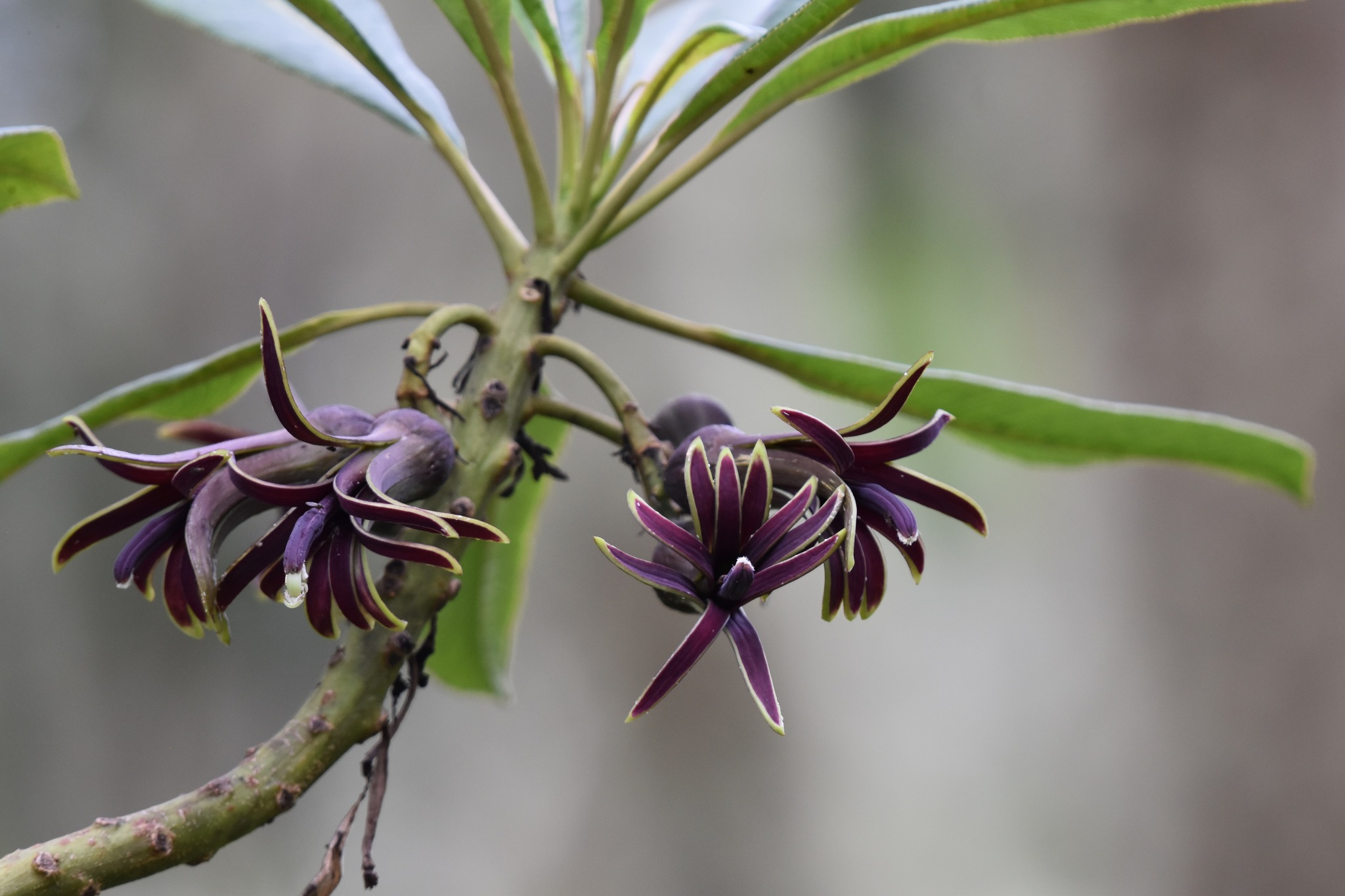

Conservation status
- Critically Endangered (IUCN 3.1)

Scientific classification
- Kingdom: Plantae
- Clade: Embryophytes
- Clade: Tracheophytes
- Clade: Spermatophytes
- Clade: Angiosperms
- Clade: Eudicots
- Clade: Asterids
- Order: Asterales
- Family: Campanulaceae
- Genus: Clermontia
- Species: C. peleana

Binomial name
- Clermontia peleana Rock

= Clermontia peleana =

Species of flowering plant

Clermontia peleana is a rare species of flowering plant in the bellflower family known by the common name Pele clermontia. It is one of several Hawaiian lobelioids in genus Clermontia that are known as `oha wai. This plant is endemic to the island of Hawaii, where it is known from a few individuals. It is a federally listed endangered species of the United States.

There are two subspecies. When the plant was placed on the endangered species list, only subsp. peleana was believed extinct, and it was known from eight remaining wild plants. The last of the eight died in the year 2000, and the species was then only known from one cultivated plant. Breeding efforts produced a number of seedlings that were transplanted into the species' native habitat, and by 2007, one of them was flowering.

The other subspecies, subsp. singuliflora, was last seen on Hawaii in 1909 and Maui in 1920. It is currently declared as Critically endangered. In the summer of 2010 several actively reproducing specimens were discovered in the forests of the Hawaiian volcano Kohala, a place it had never been seen before. Seeds were collected and propagation efforts will be made.
