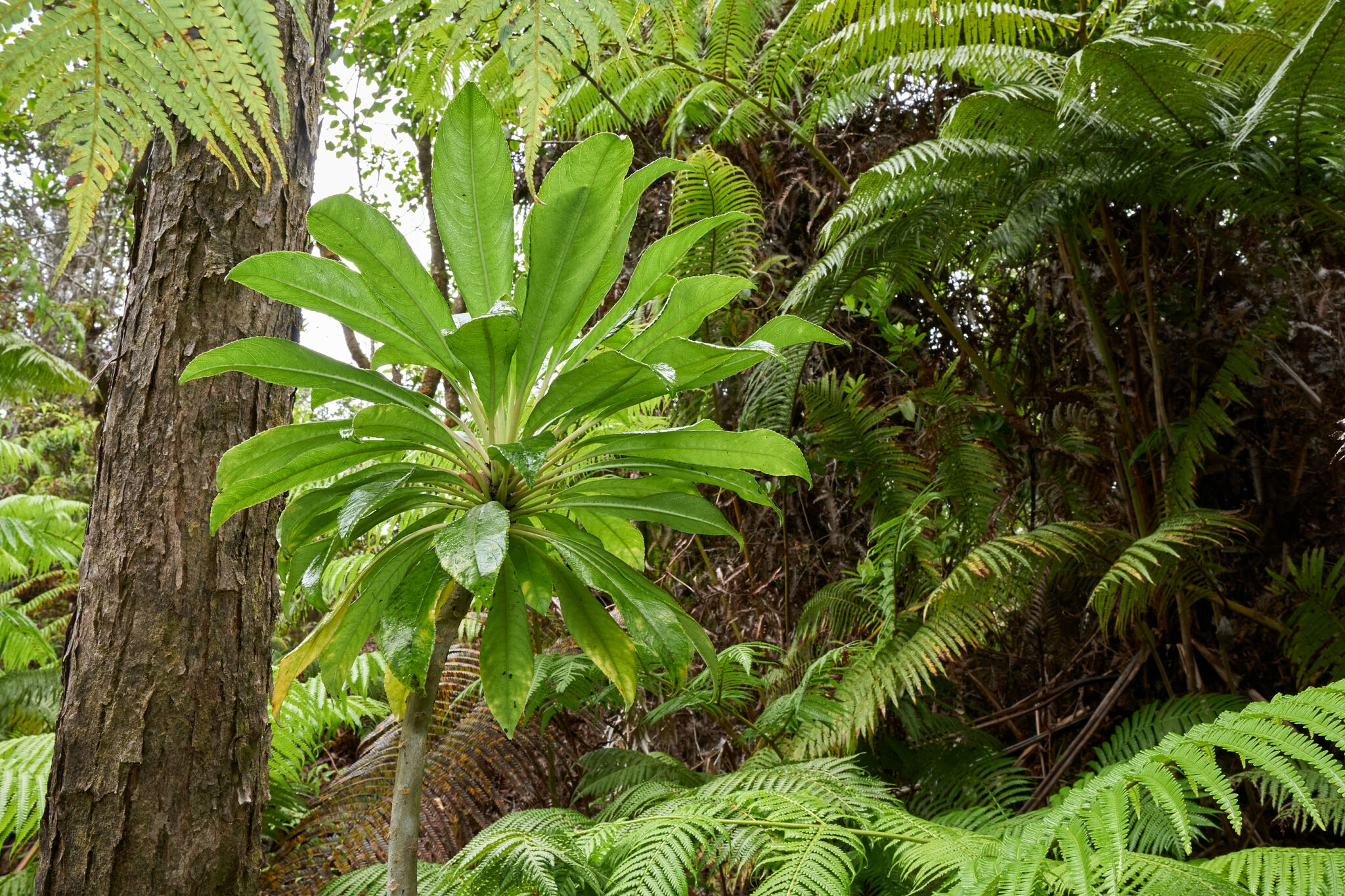

Conservation status
- Vulnerable (NatureServe)

Scientific classification
- Kingdom: Plantae
- Clade: Tracheophytes
- Clade: Angiosperms
- Clade: Eudicots
- Clade: Asterids
- Order: Asterales
- Family: Campanulaceae
- Genus: Clermontia
- Species: C. montis-loa

Binomial name
- Clermontia montis-loa Rock

= Clermontia montis-loa =

Species of Clermontia

Clermontia montis-loa, or Mauna Loa clermontia, is a species of Hawaiian lobelioid endemic to the eastern windward slopes of Mauna Loa on the island of Hawai'i. Like other Clermontia, it is referred to as ʻŌhā wai in Hawaiian.

== Description ==
Clermontia montis-loa grows as a tree or shrub, reaching heights of 2-5m. Leaves are 8-19cm long and 2.2-4.5cm wide, growing in a radial pattern. Flowers are purple-pink with 2-3 per inflorescence, developing into orange fruit 2.5-3cm long.

== Distribution & habitat ==
Clermontia montis-loa grows in native wet rainforests on the windward slopes of Mauna Loa. It inhabits elevations between 3,500–5,500 feet (1,100–1,700 m).

== Ecology ==
While C. montis-loa primarily grows on the ground (where not severely predated by invasive rats and pigs), it can also grow on other trees as an epiphyte, a trait it shares with several other Clermontia species.

Like other Clermontia, C. montis-loa is adapted to pollination by native Hawaiian honeycreepers (especially curve-billed species such as the ʻiʻiwi) and honeyeaters. With the dramatic decline in endemic forest bird populations (and the complete extinction of the honeyeaters) over the past two centuries, C. montis-loa and similar lobelioids are now relying almost solely on non-native birds such as the Warbling white-eye for pollination.
