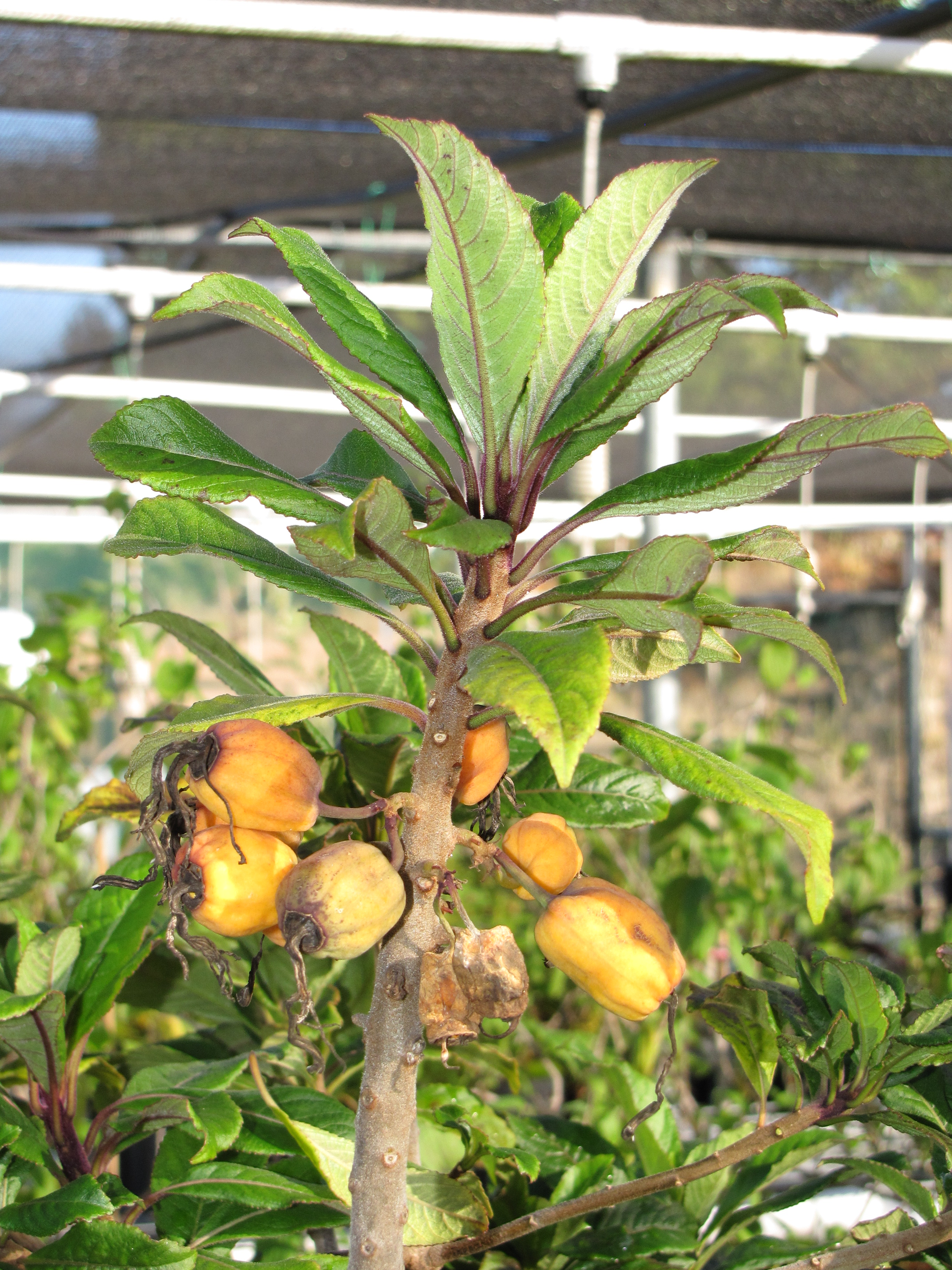

Conservation status
- Endangered (IUCN 3.1)

Scientific classification
- Kingdom: Plantae
- Clade: Tracheophytes
- Clade: Angiosperms
- Clade: Eudicots
- Clade: Asterids
- Order: Asterales
- Family: Campanulaceae
- Genus: Clermontia
- Species: C. samuelii

Binomial name
- Clermontia samuelii S.N.Forbes (1920)

Subspecies
- C. s. subsp. hanaensis C. s. subsp. samuelii

= Clermontia samuelii =

Species of flowering plant

Clermontia samuelii is a rare species of flowering plant in the bellflower family known by the common name Hana clermontia. It is one of several Hawaiian lobelioids in genus Clermontia that are known as `oha wai. This plant is endemic to Maui, where there are fewer than 250 mature specimens remaining. This is a federally listed endangered species of the United States.

This is a shrub which can reach five meters in height. It grows in wet Metrosideros forests. Some individuals are protected within Haleakalā National Park. Threats to the species include invasive plant species such as glory bush (Tibouchina herbacea) and Vaseygrass (Paspalum urvillei), and feral pigs, which inflict severe damage upon the ecosystem.
