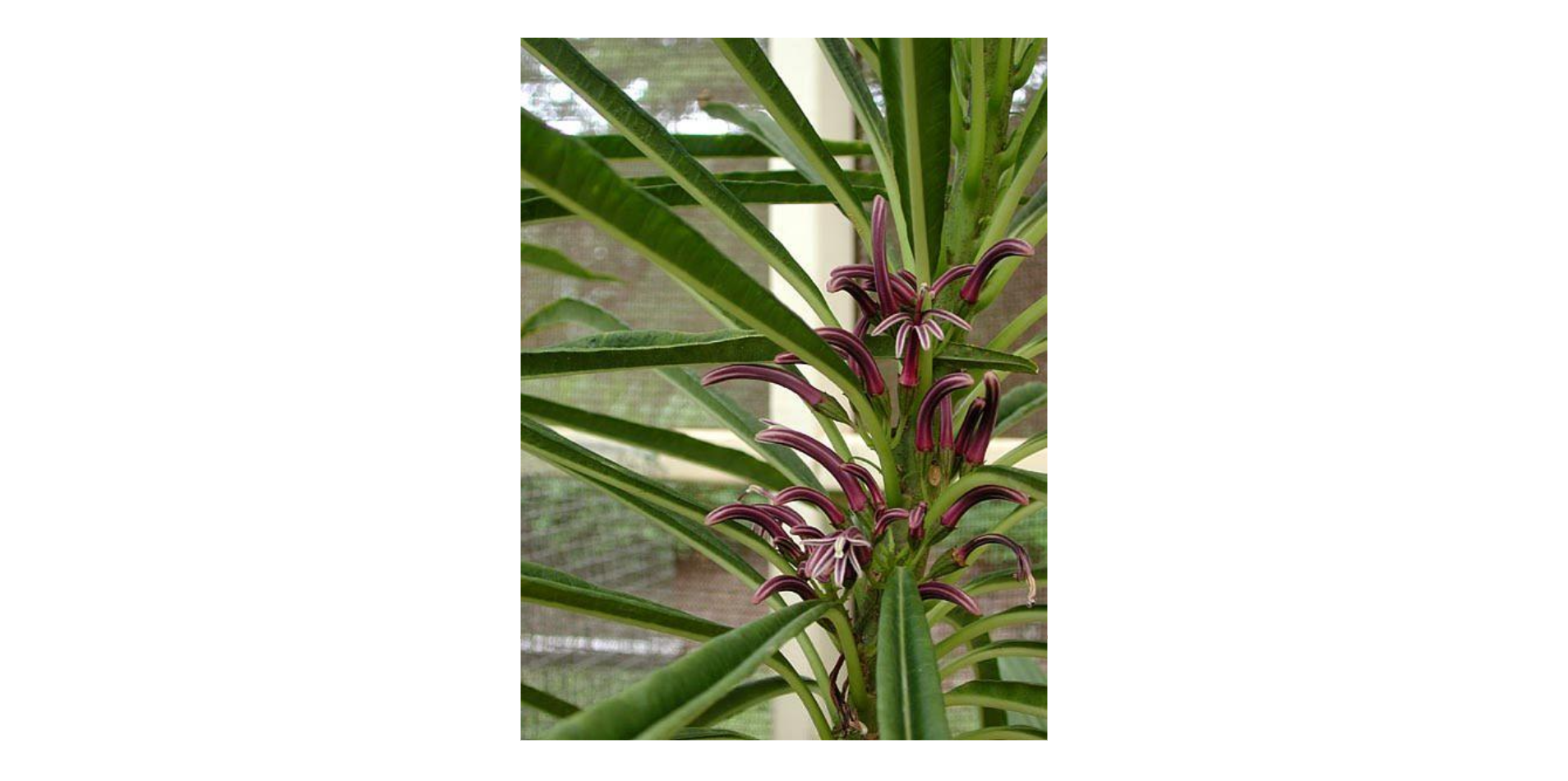

Conservation status
- Critically Endangered (IUCN 3.1)

- Critically Imperiled (NatureServe)

Scientific classification
- Kingdom: Plantae
- Clade: Tracheophytes
- Clade: Angiosperms
- Clade: Eudicots
- Clade: Asterids
- Order: Asterales
- Family: Campanulaceae
- Genus: Cyanea
- Species: C. kuhihewa

Binomial name
- Cyanea kuhihewa Lammers

= Cyanea kuhihewa =

Species of flowering plant

Cyanea kuhihewa is a rare species of flowering plant in the bellflower family known by the common name Limahuli Valley cyanea. It is endemic to Kauai, where only two mature plants are known from a single wild population. Like other Cyanea it is known as haha in Hawaiian.

This species belongs to the genus Cyanea, a Hawaiian lobelioid group of plants that evolved within the Hawaiian Islands. Cyanea kuhihewa has become an important focus of conversation efforts, since it's considered one of the rarest plant species in the Hawaiian Islands due to its small population size and restricted geographic range. Conservation efforts focus on habitat protection, invasive species control, and propagation to increase the population.

== Description ==
Cyanea kuhihewa grows as a shrub and displays physical traits commonly seen in other Cyanea species. This species is a "treelet" growing to between 30 and 200 cm (12 and 79 in) in height. The narrow linear leaves are up to 38 cm (15 in) long by 1.5 cm (0.59 in) wide. The inflorescence is a raceme of purple-pink flowers.

This species is distinguished by its slender leaves and its elongated floral tubes. These are characteristics typical of bird-pollinated lobeloids. The pink-purple flowers can help attract native honeycreepers, which served as primary pollinators for many Cyanea species. After pollination, the plant produces fruits that are dispersed by birds. This contributes to seed distribution within steep valley ecosystems.

Cyanea kuhihewa typically grows in shaded, moist forest conditions that are on steep slopes where they remain relatively undisturbed. These environments protect the plant from grazing animals and other disturbances.

== Discovery ==
When the plant was discovered, it was initially thought to be Cyanea linearifolia, an extinct species, and the discovery was broadcast and celebrated. Upon closer examination, the plant proved to be quite different from C. linearifolia and was determined to be a new species. It was given the name Cyanea kuhihewa in 1996. The species name kuhihewa is a Hawaiian verb that means "to make an error of judgment, to mistake someone for someone else, to not recognize someone when you first see him".

The type specimen of the plant was collected in 1991, and the following year, the habitat was seriously damaged by Hurricane Iniki. Since then, the single population dwindled and disappeared. In 2006, the plant was considered "possibly extinct" in the wild. It was rediscovered in 2017.

The rediscovery of Cyanea kuhihewa was significant because it demonstrates the resilience of the native Hawaiian plant species despite severe habitat disturbance. Unfortunately, the rediscovered population stayed small, which shows its vulnerability. The plant's history went from being misidentified, presumed to be extinct, and rediscovered. This is an example of rare plant conservation in Hawai'i.

== Conservation ==
Cyanea kuhihewa is classified as endangered by the IUCN Red List. The species faces risks associated with low genetic diversity, which may reduce reproductive success and resilience to environmental change due to the lack of individuals in the population. Cyanea kuhihewa is threatened by invasive plant species, damage from non-native animals, and habitat loss.

The species is threatened by competition with introduced weeds, including Clidemia hirta, Rubus rosifolius, and Sphaeropteris cooperi. Other threats include habitat degradation by pigs, rats, and slugs.

Conservation strategies include habitat management, removal of invasive plant species, and fencing to exclude feral animals. To protect the species, conservation groups such as the National Tropical Botanical Garden have searched for remaining plants and worked to restore their natural habitats and propagate new individuals. Several seeds have been collected from wild populations. These seeds are stored in the National Tropical Botanical Garden and the Lyon Arboretum. Conservationists hope to restore them to the NTBG's Limahuli Preserve.

Propagation efforts aim to increase the number of individuals and potentially reintroduce plants to protected habitats. The species has become part of broader conservation efforts focused on protecting endangered Hawaiian species.
