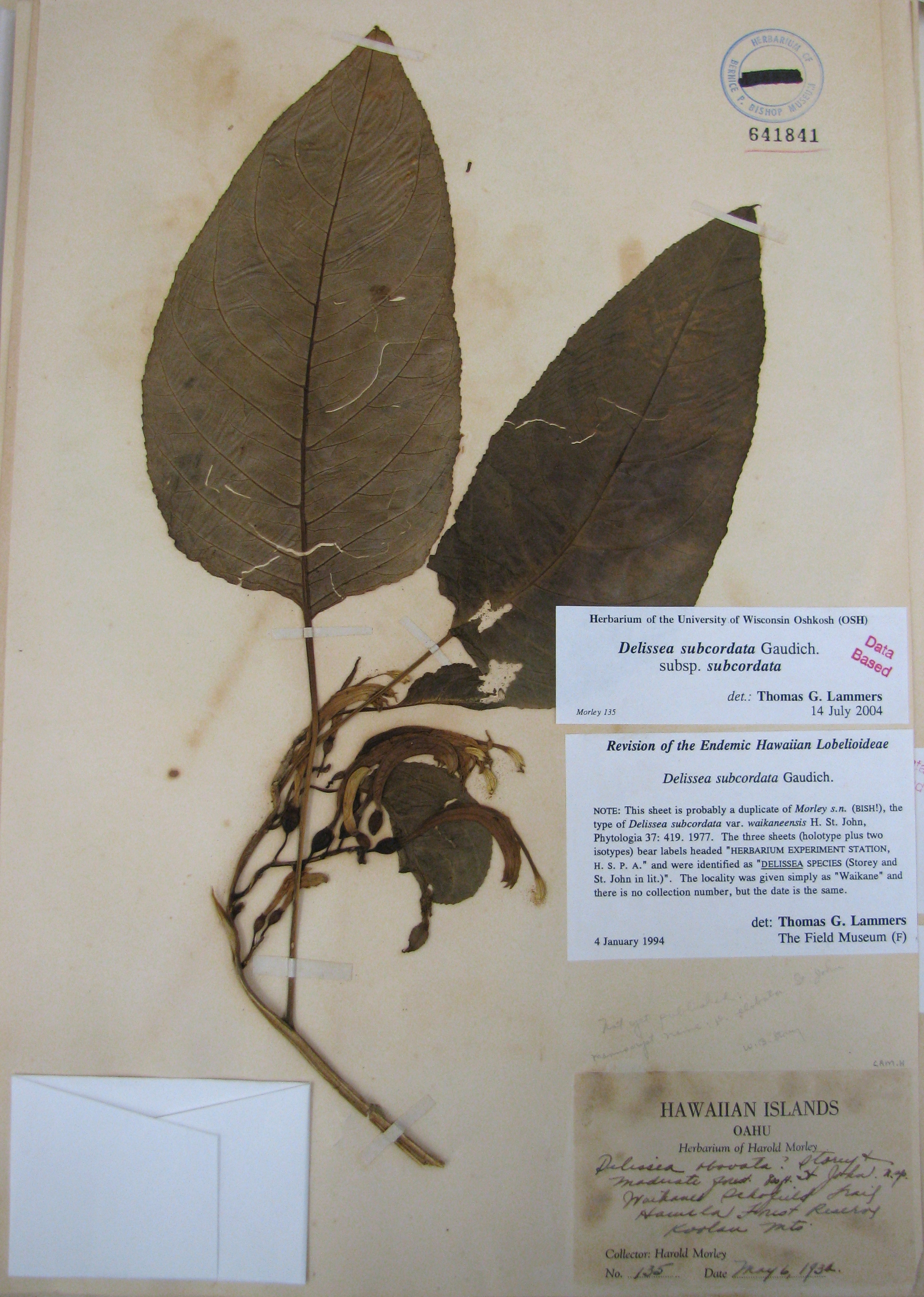
- Herbarium specimen
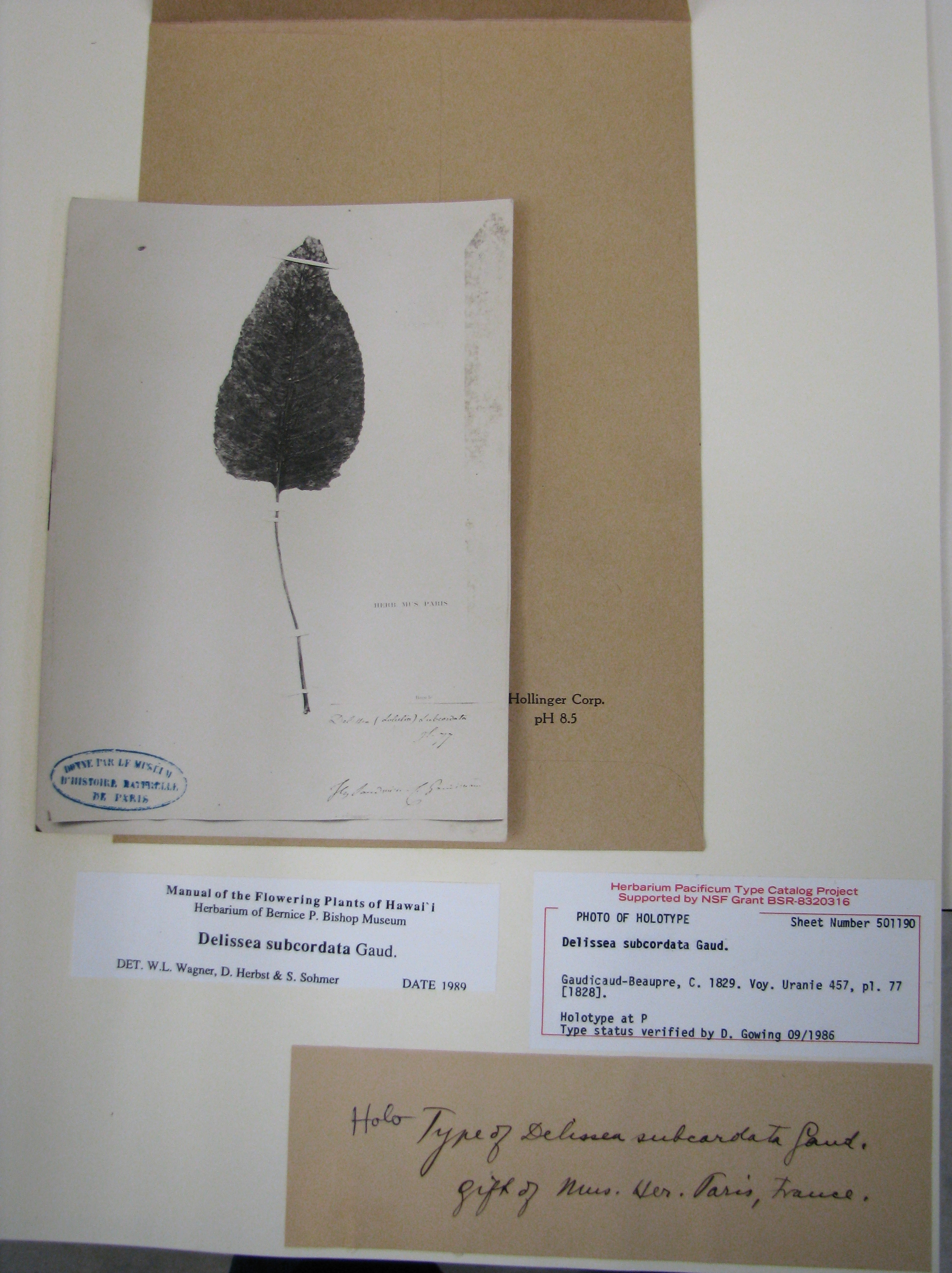
- Holotype specimen

Conservation status
- Critically Imperiled (NatureServe)

Scientific classification
- Kingdom: Plantae
- Clade: Tracheophytes
- Clade: Angiosperms
- Clade: Eudicots
- Clade: Asterids
- Order: Asterales
- Family: Campanulaceae
- Genus: Delissea
- Species: D. subcordata

Binomial name
- Delissea subcordata Gaudich.

Subspecies
- D. s. subsp. obtusifolia D. s. subsp. subcordata

= Delissea subcordata =

Species of flowering plant

Delissea subcordata is a rare species of flowering plant in the family Campanulaceae known by the common names Koʻolau Range delissea and oha. It is endemic to Hawaii, where it is known only from the island of Oahu. It is now only found in the Waianae Mountains, and it is believed to be extirpated from the Koʻolau Range, where it once occurred. As of 2008 there were 40 individuals remaining, 28 of which were mature plants. This plant was federally listed as an endangered species of the United States in 1996.

This Hawaiian lobelioid is a shrub which grows up to 3 meters tall and bears white or greenish flowers. It grows in moist forest habitat. Other plants in the forests include ohia lehua (Metrosideros polymorpha) and koa (Acacia koa), which dominate the canopy, and Ēlama (Diospyros hillebrandii), papala kepau (Pisonia spp.), and ʻĀlaʻa (Planchonella sandwicensis) in the understory.

Threats to this rare species and its ecosystem include feral goats and pigs.
