= Delissea argutidentata =

Scientific classification
- Kingdom: Plantae
- Clade: Tracheophytes
- Clade: Angiosperms
- Clade: Eudicots
- Clade: Asterids
- Order: Asterales
- Family: Campanulaceae
- Genus: Delissea
- Species: D. argutidentata

Binomial name
- Delissea argutidentata (E.Wimm.) H.St.John

Synonyms
- Cyanea argutidentata E.Wimm.; Delissea konaensis H.St.John; Delissea undulata var. argutidentata (E.Wimm.) E.Wimm.

Flowering plant in the bellflower family

Delissea argutidentata is a rare species of flowering plant in the bellflower family, Campanulaceae. It is part of the Hawaiian lobelioid group, which is known for its unique evolutionary radiation throughout the Hawaiian Islands. The species is endemic to Hawaiʻi Island and is considered critically endangered. For many years, Delissea argutidentata was believed to be extinct in the wild, but a small wild population was rediscovered in 2021 in a remote area of Hawai'i Island. Its rediscovery is important because many Hawaiian plants have declined due to habitat loss, invasive species, and changes to native forest ecosystems.

== Description, anatomy and morphology ==
Delissea argutidentata is described as a shrub or tree with a tall, unbranched, palm-like trunk. It can grow up to about 35 ft (10.7 m) tall, making it unusually tall compared with many other plants in the lobelia family. The plant has a dense, rounded cluster of leaves at the top of its trunk, which gives it a distinctive appearance. Its fruit is a small purple, fleshy berry that is thin-walled and round, measuring about 8–10 mm in diameter. The seeds are numerous, small, grayish white, and ellipsoid in shape. These physical characteristics help distinguish the species from other Hawaiian lobelioids.

== Distribution and habitat ==
Delissea argutidentata is native to Hawaii and is listed as a Hawaii Island endemic. Its habitat is described as mesic koa forest, and records show an elevation range of about 915-1,585 meters. Historically, the species grew under the shade of large koa trees and along the bottoms and slopes of old volcanic craters. These habitats are important because they provide the shade, moisture, and native forest conditions that many Hawaiian plants need to survive. However, native Hawaiian forests have been strongly affected by invasive plants, grazing animals, habitat disturbance, and other environmental pressures.

== Conservation status ==
Delissea argutidentata is listed as critically endangered by the IUCN and is identified by Laukahi: The Hawai i Plant Conservation Network as a species of conservation importance. In 1992, one wild individual was rediscovered at Pu'u Wa'awa'a, but that plant died in 2002. Before the more recent discovery, there were no known wild plants, although seeds had been collected and some outplanted individuals survived. In March 2021, conservation workers found a small wild population, collected ripe fruit, and sent some material to Lyon Arboretum and the Volcano Rare Plant Facility for seed storage and propagation. In 2022, conservation staff also observed two small wild seedlings within a protected enclosure. These efforts show the importance of partnerships among landowners, conservation agencies, and plant specialists in protecting rare Hawaiian plants.

== Human use and cultural significance ==
There is no clearly recorded traditional human use for Delissea argutidentata. However, the species still has cultural and ecological significance because it is part of Hawai i’s native biodiversity. Kamehameha Schools notes that no Hawaiian name has been recorded for the plant, but because it resembles plants in the related genus Cyanea, it may have been similar to plants known as hāhā. Because of its tall form, it has also been described as hāhā ki eki e, meaning “tall ʻhāhā.” The rediscovery of this species is meaningful because it shows that rare native plants can still survive in protected and remote habitats. Protecting Delissea argutidentata also supports the broader health of Hawaiian forests and the cultural value of caring for the āina.
