= Lobelia monostachya =

Conservation status
- Critically Endangered (IUCN 3.1)

Scientific classification
- Kingdom: Plantae
- Clade: Tracheophytes
- Clade: Angiosperms
- Clade: Eudicots
- Clade: Asterids
- Order: Asterales
- Family: Campanulaceae
- Genus: Lobelia
- Species: L. monostachya

Binomial name
- Lobelia monostachya (Rock) Lammers

Species of flowering plant

Lobelia monostachya, the one-stalked lobelia, is a species of flowering plant in the family Campanulaceae that is endemic to the island of Oʻahu in Hawaii. It inhabits cliffside mesic shrublands in the southern Koʻolau Mountains at an elevation of 44–614 m (144–2,014 ft). It was previously believed to be extinct. In 1994 it was rediscovered and only 8 individuals are currently known to exist. Associated native plants include Artemisia australis, Carex meyenii, Eragrostis spp., and Psilotum nudum. It is threatened by habitat loss.
