= Lobelia gaudichaudii =

Conservation status
- Critically Endangered (IUCN 3.1)

Scientific classification
- Kingdom: Plantae
- Clade: Tracheophytes
- Clade: Angiosperms
- Clade: Eudicots
- Clade: Asterids
- Order: Asterales
- Family: Campanulaceae
- Genus: Lobelia
- Species: L. gaudichaudii

Binomial name
- Lobelia gaudichaudii A.DC.

Species of flowering plant

Lobelia gaudichaudii is a species of flowering plant in the bellflower family known by the common name Koolau Range lobelia. It is endemic to Hawaii, where it is known only from the island of Oahu.

There are two subspecies of the plant. One, ssp. koolauensis, is limited to five populations with a total of 252 individuals, and is listed as an endangered species by the US government.

The tubular flower is up to 75 centimeters long and may be any of several shades of red, greenish, yellowish, or white.
