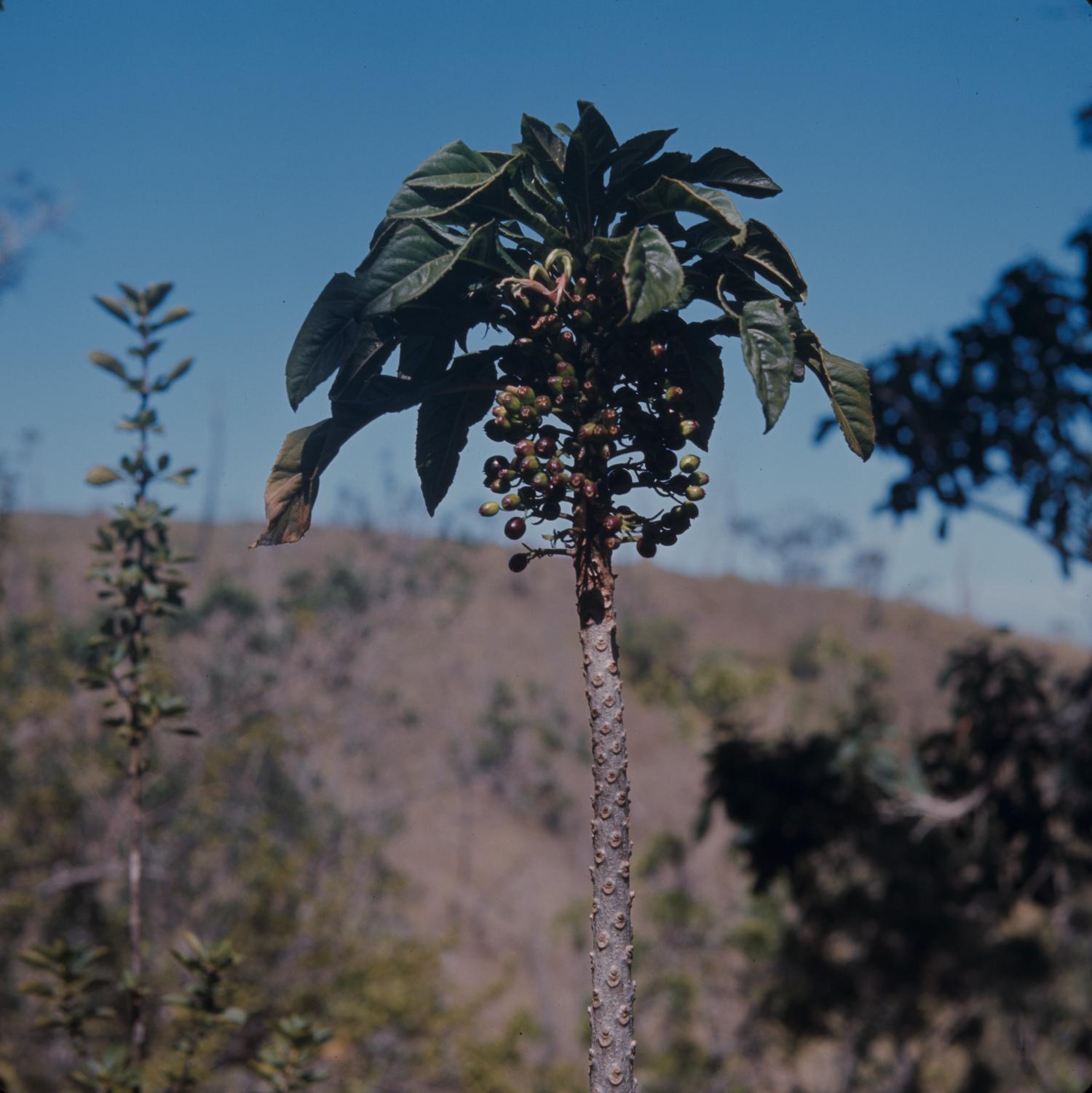
- Delissea undulata on Hawaiʻi Island, photographed by Sherwin Carlquist in 1966

Conservation status
- Extinct (IUCN 3.1)

- Critically Imperiled (NatureServe)

Scientific classification
- Kingdom: Plantae
- Clade: Embryophytes
- Clade: Tracheophytes
- Clade: Angiosperms
- Clade: Eudicots
- Clade: Asterids
- Order: Asterales
- Family: Campanulaceae
- Genus: Delissea
- Species: †D. undulata

Binomial name
- †Delissea undulata Gaudich.

= Delissea undulata =

Species of plant in the family Campanulaceae

Delissea undulata (common name ʻoha) is an extremely rare species of "palmoid" or "Corner model tree" (a pachycaulous unbranched tree superficially resembling a palm or cycad) formerly occurring on the Big Island of Hawai'i. It is cited as extinct by the IUCN Red List and Plants of the World Online, but is also reported in cultivation from a single surviving plant found in 1992. It is in the subfamily Lobelioideae of the family Campanulaceae. The tree is up to 11 m (36 ft) in height but only 5 cm (2.0 in) in diameter at breast height (DBH). It never branches. The terminal rosette of wavey-edged leaves is only 45 cm (18 in) across. The flowers are tubular and straight.
