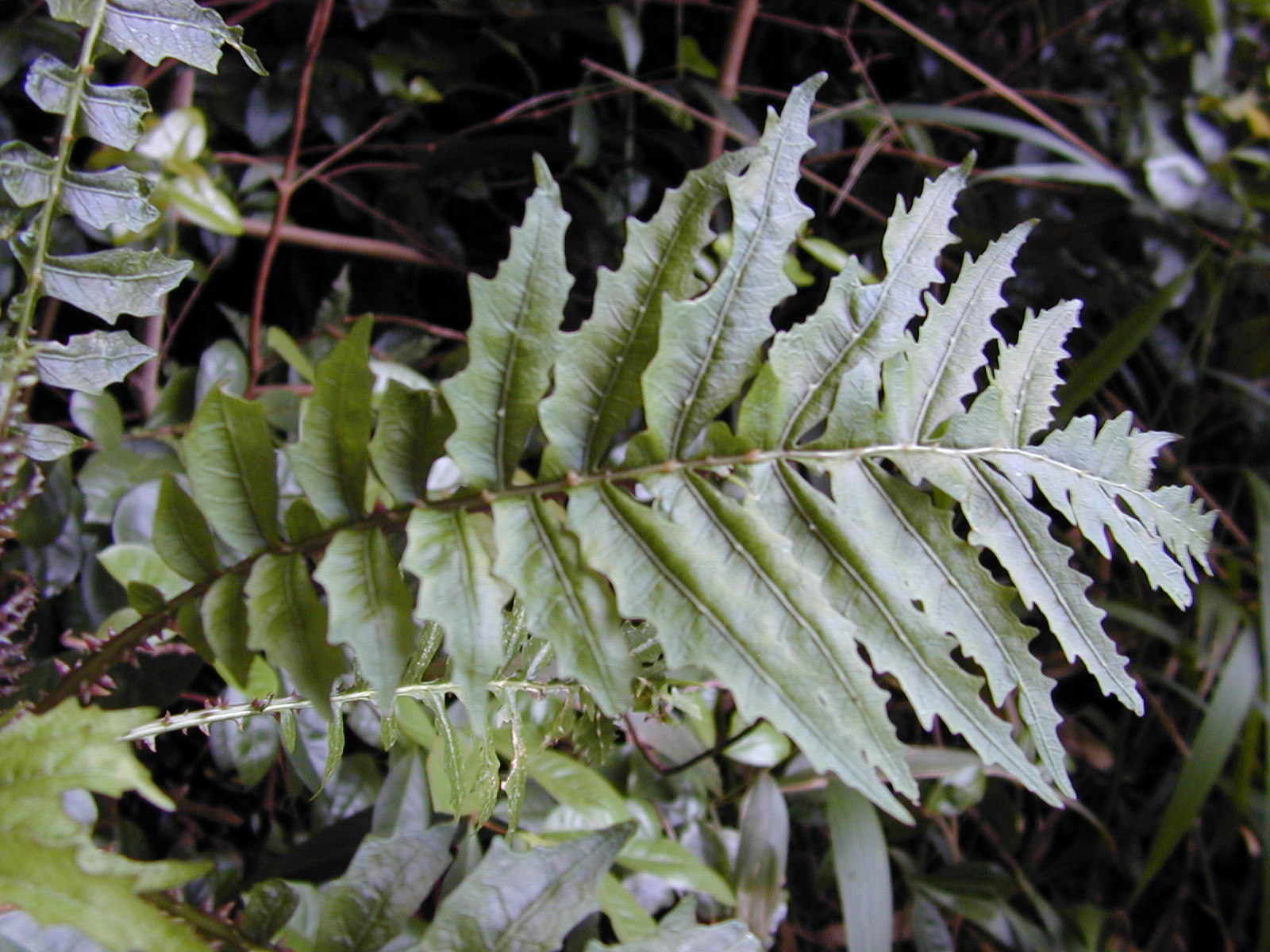

Conservation status
- Critically Endangered (IUCN 3.1)

Scientific classification
- Kingdom: Plantae
- Clade: Tracheophytes
- Clade: Angiosperms
- Clade: Eudicots
- Clade: Asterids
- Order: Asterales
- Family: Campanulaceae
- Genus: Cyanea
- Species: C. asplenifolia

Binomial name
- Cyanea asplenifolia (H.Mann) Hillebr., 1888

Synonyms
- Delissea asplenifolia H.Mann

= Cyanea asplenifolia =

Species of plant

Cyanea asplenifolia is a flowering plant in the Campanulaceae family. The IUCN has classified the species as critically endangered. It is native to the Hawaiian Islands.

== Description ==
It is a flowering perennial shrub from 1.3 to 2 meters tall.

== Taxonomy ==
Flowering plant species first discovered by Horace Mann Jr. It was described by Wilhelm B. Hillebrand, in Fl. Hawaiian Isl.: 260 in 1888.
