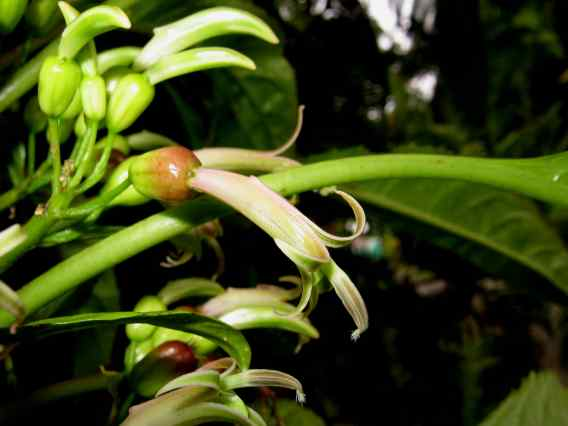

Conservation status
- Critically endangered, possibly extinct in the wild (IUCN 3.1)

Scientific classification
- Kingdom: Plantae
- Clade: Tracheophytes
- Clade: Angiosperms
- Clade: Eudicots
- Clade: Asterids
- Order: Asterales
- Family: Campanulaceae
- Genus: Delissea
- Species: D. rhytidosperma

Binomial name
- Delissea rhytidosperma H.Mann

Synonyms
- Delissea kealiae Wawra

= Delissea rhytidosperma =

Species of flowering plant

Delissea rhytidosperma is a rare species of flowering plant in the bellflower family, Campanulaceae. It is known by the common names Kauaʻi delissea, Kauaʻi leechleaf delissea, and leechleaf delissea. It is endemic to Hawaii where it is known only from the island of Kauaʻi. It is critically endangered or extinct in the wild.

Some populations that were formerly included in the species D. rhytidosperma are now called Delissea kauaiensis. It is a federally listed endangered species.

== Description ==
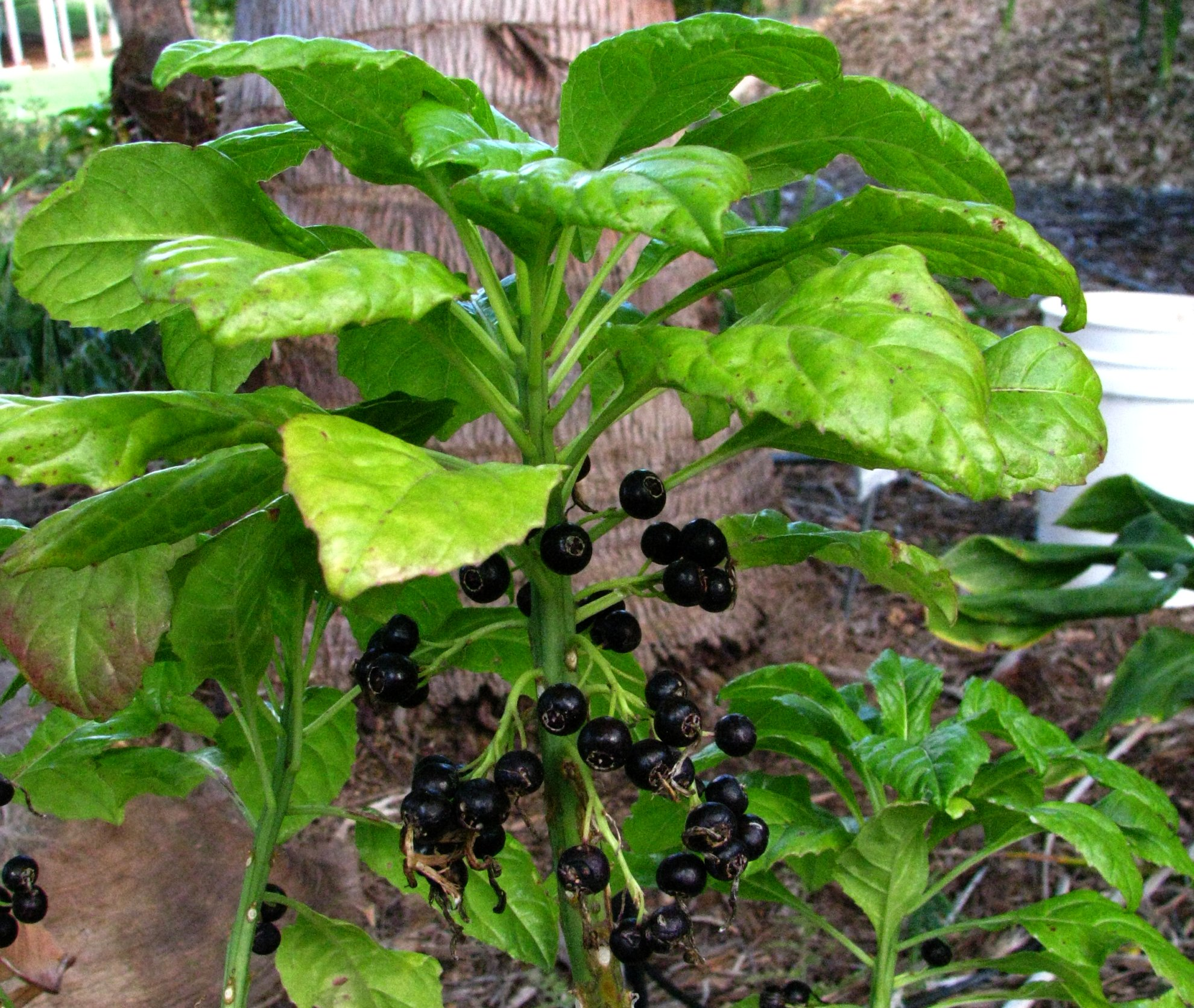
Fruit of Delissea rhytidosperma

Delissea rhytidosperma, a Hawaiian lobelioid, is a shrub which grows up to 2.5 metres (8.2 ft) tall. The leaves have lance-shaped or nearly oval blades up to 19 centimeters long. The tubular flowers have greenish or purplish petals and distinctive hairs next to the anthers.

The plant's natural habitat is rocky cliffsides in moist forests dominated by Acacia koa. This habitat has been destroyed and degraded by the action of feral pigs, goats, and mule deer, and by exotic plant species. Germination and establishment are further limited by non-native rodents, snails, and grasses.
