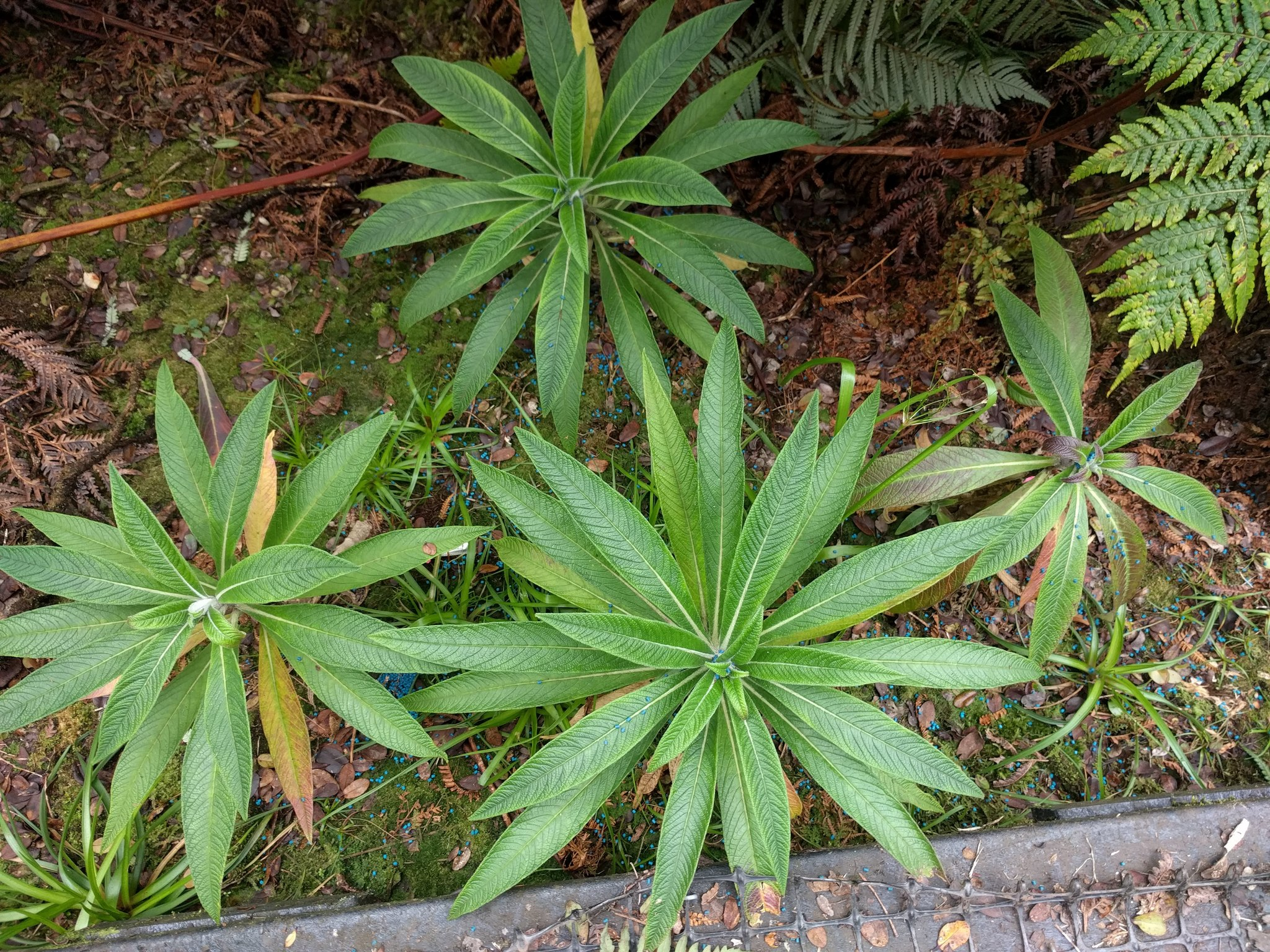

Conservation status
- Critically Endangered (IUCN 3.1)

Scientific classification
- Kingdom: Plantae
- Clade: Tracheophytes
- Clade: Angiosperms
- Clade: Eudicots
- Clade: Asterids
- Order: Asterales
- Family: Campanulaceae
- Genus: Lobelia
- Species: L. oahuensis

Binomial name
- Lobelia oahuensis Rock

= Lobelia oahuensis =

Species of plant

Lobelia oahuensis is a rare species of flowering plant in the bellflower family known by the common name Oahu lobelia. It is endemic to Hawaii, where it is known only from the island of Oahu. About 100 individuals are remaining in the Koʻolau Range, and only one known individual in the Waianae Range. It is federally listed as an endangered species of the United States.

This plant grows almost exclusively on the high, exposed main ridge of the mountains, where its habitat is wet shrublands on the windy slopes up to the ridgelines of the cloud zone. It is threatened by habitat degradation and predation.

The inflorescence of this plant is over a meter long and densely packed with blue flowers.
