= List of Mikania species =

Mikania is a genus of plants in the family Asteraceae. As of July 2026, Plants of the World Online accepted 447 species.

== A ==
- Mikania acuminata DC.
- Mikania acutissima Rusby
- Mikania additicia B.L.Rob.
- Mikania alba N.Taylor
- Mikania alexandreae G.M.Barroso
- Mikania allartii B.L.Rob.
- Mikania alvimii R.M.King & H.Rob.
- Mikania amblyolepis B.L.Rob.
- Mikania amorimii Borges & Forzza
- Mikania andrei B.L.Rob.
- Mikania anethifolia (DC.) Matzenb.
- Mikania angularis Bonpl.
- Mikania anisodora Hassl.
- Mikania aquaria B.L.Rob.
- Mikania araguensis V.M.Badillo
- Mikania archeri B.L.Rob.
- Mikania areolata W.C.Holmes & McDaniel
- Mikania argyreiae DC.
- Mikania argyropappa Sch.Bip. ex Baker
- Mikania ariasiana Al.Rodr.
- Mikania aristei B.L.Rob.
- Mikania arrojadoi Mattf.
- Mikania arthroclada B.L.Rob.
- Mikania aschersonii Hieron.

== B ==
- Mikania badiniana G.S.S.Almeida & Carv.-Okano
- Mikania bakeri R.M.King & H.Rob.
- Mikania banisteriae DC.
- Mikania barahonensis Urb.
- Mikania barrosoana G.M.Barroso
- Mikania belemii R.M.King & H.Rob.
- Mikania betancurii Aguilar-Cano & S.Díaz
- Mikania biformis DC.
- Mikania bishopii R.M.King & H.Rob.
- Mikania bogotensis Benth.
- Mikania boomii Pruski
- Mikania brachycarpa Urb.
- Mikania brachyphylla Hieron.
- Mikania bradei B.L.Rob.
- Mikania brevifaucia W.C.Holmes & McDaniel
- Mikania broadwayi B.L.Rob.
- Mikania brunnescens B.L.Rob.
- Mikania buchii Urb.
- Mikania buchtienii B.L.Rob.
- Mikania buddlejifolia DC.
- Mikania bulbisetifera Cuatrec.
- Mikania bullata B.L.Rob.
- Mikania burchellii Baker

== C ==
- Mikania cabrerae G.M.Barroso
- Mikania cacerensis G.M.Barroso
- Mikania calcarulata B.L.Rob.
- Mikania caldasana B.L.Rob.
- Mikania callineura Sch.Bip. ex Baker
- Mikania campanulata Gardner
- Mikania campii H.Rob. & W.C.Holmes
- Mikania camporum B.L.Rob.
- Mikania campos-portoana G.M.Barroso
- Mikania candolleana Gardner
- Mikania capixaba Borges & Fraga
- Mikania capricorni B.L.Rob.
- Mikania cardiophylla B.L.Rob.
- Mikania carnosa Muschl.
- Mikania casarettoi B.L.Rob.
- Mikania castroi R.M.King & H.Rob.
- Mikania cercifolia W.C.Holmes
- Mikania chaetoloba Pruski
- Mikania chenopodiifolia Willd.
- Mikania chevalieri (C.D.Adams) W.C.Holmes & McDaniel
- Mikania chimborazensis Hieron. ex Sodiro
- Mikania chlorolepis Baker
- Mikania chocensis B.L.Rob.
- Mikania cipoensis G.M.Barroso
- Mikania citriodora W.C.Holmes
- Mikania clematidiflora Rusby ex B.L.Rob.
- Mikania clematidifolia Dusén
- Mikania coarctata Gardner
- Mikania cochabambana B.L.Rob.
- Mikania comarapensis B.L.Rob.
- Mikania concinna Standl. & Steyerm.
- Mikania conferta Gardner
- Mikania confertissima Sch.Bip. ex Baker
- Mikania congesta DC.
- Mikania conglomerata W.C.Holmes & McDaniel
- Mikania cordata (Burm.f.) B.L.Rob.
- Mikania cordifolia (L.f.) Willd.
- Mikania cordigera W.C.Holmes
- Mikania corei W.C.Holmes & McDaniel
- Mikania corymbiifolia (B.L.Rob.) R.M.King & H.Rob.
- Mikania corymbulosa Benth.
- Mikania crassifolia Hieron.
- Mikania crispiflora C.Wright
- Mikania cristata B.L.Rob.
- Mikania cuatrecasasii W.C.Holmes
- Mikania cuencana Hieron.
- Mikania cuspidata Al.Rodr.
- Mikania cutervensis Hieron.
- Mikania cuzcoensis W.C.Holmes & McDaniel
- Mikania cyanosma Urb. & Ekman
- Mikania cynanchifolia Hook. & Arn. ex Baker & Malme

== D ==
- Mikania daspitii W.C.Holmes & McDaniel
- Mikania decora Poepp.
- Mikania decumbens Malme
- Mikania desmocephala B.L.Rob.
- Mikania dictyophylla B.L.Rob.
- Mikania dictyota B.L.Rob.
- Mikania dioica Al.Rodr.
- Mikania dioscoreoides (Rusby) B.L.Rob.
- Mikania discifera W.C.Holmes & H.Rob.
- Mikania dissecta Urb. & Ekman
- Mikania diversifolia DC.
- Mikania dodsonii H.Rob. & W.C.Holmes
- Mikania duckei G.M.Barroso
- Mikania dudleyi W.C.Holmes & McDaniel
- Mikania duidensis B.L.Rob.
- Mikania dusenii B.L.Rob.

== E ==
- Mikania ecuadorensis W.C.Holmes & McDaniel
- Mikania elliptica DC.
- Mikania erioclada DC.
- Mikania eriostrepta B.L.Rob.
- Mikania eucosma B.L.Rob.
- Mikania euryanthela (Malme) W.C.Holmes

== F ==
- Mikania farsiliflora H.Rob. & W.C.Holmes
- Mikania fasciculata C.T.Oliveira & Pirani
- Mikania featherstonei B.L.Rob.
- Mikania filgueirasii R.M.King & H.Rob.
- Mikania filicifolia B.L.Rob.
- Mikania firmula Baker
- Mikania flabellata Rusby ex B.L.Rob.
- Mikania flaccida B.L.Rob.
- Mikania fosbergii H.Rob. & W.C.Holmes
- Mikania fragilis Urb.
- Mikania fragrans Klatt
- Mikania fulva (Hook. & Arn.) Baker
- Mikania funkiae C.T.Oliveira & Antar

== G ==
- Mikania glabra D.J.N.Hind
- Mikania glandulifera W.C.Holmes & McDaniel
- Mikania glandulosissima W.C.Holmes & D.J.N.Hind
- Mikania glauca Mart.
- Mikania glaziovii Baker
- Mikania gleasonii B.L.Rob.
- Mikania globifera Rusby ex B.L.Rob.
- Mikania globosa (J.M.Coult.) Donn.Sm.
- Mikania glomerata Spreng.
- Mikania gonzalezii B.L.Rob. & Greenm.
- Mikania goyazensis (B.L.Rob.) R.M.King & H.Rob.
- Mikania gracilipes B.L.Rob.
- Mikania granulata B.L.Rob.
- Mikania grazielae R.M.King & H.Rob.
- Mikania guaco Bonpl.
- Mikania guaranitica Hassl.
- Mikania guilleminii B.L.Rob.
- Mikania gunnarii H.Rob. & W.C.Holmes

== H ==
- Mikania haenkeana DC.
- Mikania hagei R.M.King & H.Rob.
- Mikania harlingii R.M.King & H.Rob.
- Mikania hartbergii W.C.Holmes
- Mikania hastata (L.) Willd.
- Mikania hastato-cordata Malme
- Mikania hastifolia Baker
- Mikania hemisphaerica Sch.Bip. ex Baker
- Mikania hensoldiana Sánchez Vega & M.O.Dillon
- Mikania hesperia B.L.Rob.
- Mikania hexagonocaulis W.C.Holmes & McDaniel
- Mikania hioramii Britton & B.L.Rob.
- Mikania hitchcockii B.L.Rob.
- Mikania hoehnei B.L.Rob.
- Mikania hoffmanniana Dusén ex Malme
- Mikania holmesiana Pruski
- Mikania holwayana B.L.Rob.
- Mikania hookeriana DC.
- Mikania houstoniana (L.) Willd.
- Mikania houstonioides H.Rob. & W.C.Holmes
- Mikania huanucoensis W.C.Holmes & McDaniel
- Mikania huitzensis Standl. & Steyerm.

== I ==
- Mikania iltisii R.M.King & H.Rob.
- Mikania incasina B.L.Rob.
- Mikania infesta B.L.Rob.
- Mikania inordinata R.M.King & H.Rob.
- Mikania inornata B.L.Rob.
- Mikania involucrata Hook. & Arn.
- Mikania iodotricha S.F.Blake
- Mikania iquitosensis B.L.Rob.
- Mikania iserniana Cuatrec.
- Mikania itambana Gardner

== J ==
- Mikania jamaicensis B.L.Rob.
- Mikania jeffreyi D.J.N.Hind
- Mikania jelskii Hieron.
- Mikania johnstonii B.L.Rob.
- Mikania jujuyensis Cabrera
- Mikania juninensis W.C.Holmes & McDaniel

== K ==
- Mikania killipii B.L.Rob.
- Mikania klugii B.L.Rob.
- Mikania kubitzkii R.M.King & H.Rob.

== L ==
- Mikania laevigata Sch.Bip. ex Baker
- Mikania lagoensis Baker
- Mikania lanceolata Hieron. ex Sodiro
- Mikania lancifolia B.L.Rob.
- Mikania lasiandrae DC.
- Mikania lasiopoda B.L.Rob.
- Mikania latifolia Sm.
- Mikania latisquama Cabrera
- Mikania laurifolia (L.f.) Willd.
- Mikania lawrancei B.L.Rob.
- Mikania lehmannii Hieron.
- Mikania leiolaena DC.
- Mikania leiostachya Benth.
- Mikania lepidophora Urb.
- Mikania leptotricha Baker
- Mikania leucophylla (Rusby) B.L.Rob.
- Mikania ligustrifolia DC.
- Mikania lindbergii Baker
- Mikania lindleyana DC.
- Mikania linearifolia DC.
- Mikania lloensis Hieron.
- Mikania longiacuminata (Rusby) B.L.Rob.
- Mikania longicarpa W.C.Holmes
- Mikania longiflora (Rusby) B.L.Rob.
- Mikania longipes Baker
- Mikania lucida S.F.Blake
- Mikania luetzelburgii Mattf.
- Mikania lundiana DC.
- Mikania lutescens B.L.Rob.

== M ==
- Mikania macdanielii W.C.Holmes
- Mikania macedoi G.M.Barroso
- Mikania macrostipulata W.C.Holmes & McDaniel
- Mikania malacolepis B.L.Rob.
- Mikania manomoi D.J.N.Hind & Frisby
- Mikania marahuacensis Steyerm. & Maguire
- Mikania marinii Cabrera
- Mikania matezkii H.Rob. & W.C.Holmes
- Mikania mathewsii B.L.Rob.
- Mikania mattos-silvae R.M.King & H.Rob.
- Mikania mazanensis W.C.Holmes & McDaniel
- Mikania megalophylla W.C.Holmes & McDaniel
- Mikania mellosilvae C.T.Oliveira, Antar & Pirani
- Mikania mendocina Phil.
- Mikania micayensis B.L.Rob.
- Mikania michelangeliana Steyerm.
- Mikania micrantha Kunth
- Mikania microcephala DC.
- Mikania microdonta DC.
- Mikania microlepis Baker
- Mikania microphylla Sch.Bip. ex Baker
- Mikania microptera DC.
- Mikania millei B.L.Rob.
- Mikania minima (Baker) B.L.Rob.
- Mikania monagasensis V.M.Badillo
- Mikania montana B.L.Rob.
- Mikania montverdensis Proctor
- Mikania morii R.M.King & H.Rob.
- Mikania mosenii Malme
- Mikania mucronulifera B.L.Rob.
- Mikania multinervia Turcz.
- Mikania myriocephala DC.

== N ==
- Mikania nana W.C.Holmes
- Mikania natalensis DC.
- Mikania neblinensis Aristeg.
- Mikania neei W.C.Holmes
- Mikania nelsonii D.J.N.Hind
- Mikania nemorosa Klatt
- Mikania neurocaula DC.
- Mikania nigricans Gardner
- Mikania nodulosa Sch.Bip. ex Baker
- Mikania nummularia DC.

== O ==
- Mikania oblongifolia DC.
- Mikania obovata DC.
- Mikania obsoleta G.M.Barroso
- Mikania obtusata DC.
- Mikania ochroleuca B.L.Rob.
- Mikania odoratissima Urb.
- Mikania officinalis Mart.
- Mikania oliveirae R.Esteves & Capel
- Mikania ollgaardii H.Rob. & W.C.Holmes
- Mikania oopetala Urb.
- Mikania oreimeles B.L.Rob.
- Mikania oreophila M.R.Ritter & Miotto
- Mikania oreopola B.L.Rob.
- Mikania orleansensis Hieron.
- Mikania ovalis Griseb.
- Mikania oxylepis Sch.Bip. ex Baker

== P ==
- Mikania paceae W.C.Holmes
- Mikania pachychaeta (Baker) G.M.Barroso
- Mikania pachydictya B.L.Rob.
- Mikania pachyphylla Urb.
- Mikania palmata Pruski & W.C.Holmes
- Mikania palustri (Gardner) R.M.King & H.Rob.
- Mikania paniculata DC.
- Mikania pannosa Baker
- Mikania papillosa Klatt
- Mikania paranahybensis G.M.Barroso
- Mikania paranensis Dusén
- Mikania parodii Cabrera
- Mikania parvicapitulata Hieron.
- Mikania parviflora (Aubl.) H.Karst.
- Mikania parvifolia Baker
- Mikania pascualii B.L.Turner
- Mikania paucifolia W.C.Holmes
- Mikania pendula W.C.Holmes & McDaniel
- Mikania pennellii B.L.Rob.
- Mikania perhirta R.M.King & H.Rob.
- Mikania periplocifolia Hook. & Arn.
- Mikania pernambucensis Gardner
- Mikania perstipulata W.C.Holmes
- Mikania petrina Standl. & Steyerm.
- Mikania phaeoclados Mart. ex Baker
- Mikania pichinchensis Hieron.
- Mikania pilcomayensis B.L.Rob.
- Mikania pinnatiloba DC.
- Mikania pittieri B.L.Rob.
- Mikania platyloba Urb. & Ekman
- Mikania pohliana Sch.Bip. ex Baker
- Mikania pohlii (Baker) R.M.King & H.Rob.
- Mikania polycephala Urb.
- Mikania polychaeta Urb.
- Mikania pooleana W.C.Holmes & Vodopich
- Mikania popayanensis Hieron.
- Mikania populifolia Gardner
- Mikania porosa Urb.
- Mikania pove Al.Rodr.
- Mikania premnifolia Gardner
- Mikania producta Urb. & Ekman
- Mikania pruskii H.Rob. & W.C.Holmes
- Mikania pseudogracilis R.M.King & H.Rob.
- Mikania pseudohoffmanniana G.M.Barroso
- Mikania pseudomicrocephala R.M.King & H.Rob.
- Mikania pseudorimachii W.C.Holmes & McDaniel
- Mikania psilostachya DC.
- Mikania psylobothrya Sodiro ex H.Rob. & W.C.Holmes
- Mikania pterocaula Sch.Bip. ex Klatt
- Mikania pteropoda DC.
- Mikania pulverulenta Sodiro ex B.L.Rob.
- Mikania purpurascens (Baker) R.M.King & H.Rob.
- Mikania pycnadenia B.L.Rob.
- Mikania pyramidata Donn.Sm.

== R ==
- Mikania ramosissima Gardner
- Mikania ranunculifolia A.Rich.
- Mikania reticulata Gardner
- Mikania reticulosa C.Wright
- Mikania retifolia Sch.Bip. ex Baker
- Mikania reynoldsii W.C.Holmes
- Mikania rhomboidea Urb. & Ekman
- Mikania rimachii W.C.Holmes & McDaniel
- Mikania rimachioides H.Rob. & W.C.Holmes
- Mikania riparia Greenm.
- Mikania rivularis B.L.Rob.
- Mikania rondonensis V.M.Badillo
- Mikania roraimensis B.L.Rob.
- Mikania rothii G.M.Barroso
- Mikania rotundifolia G.M.Barroso
- Mikania rubella Lingelsh.
- Mikania rufa Benth.
- Mikania rufescens Sch.Bip. ex Baker
- Mikania rugosa B.L.Rob.
- Mikania rusbyi B.L.Rob.

== S ==
- Mikania sagittifera B.L.Rob.
- Mikania saltensis Hieron.
- Mikania salviifolia Gardner
- Mikania salzmanniifolia DC.
- Mikania santosii R.M.King & H.Rob.
- Mikania sarcodes Baker
- Mikania saxicola Sch.Bip. ex W.C.Holmes & Vodopich
- Mikania scabrida Baker
- Mikania scandens (L.) Willd.
- Mikania schenckii Hieron.
- Mikania schultzii B.L.Rob.
- Mikania seemannii B.L.Rob.
- Mikania selloi Spreng.
- Mikania semirii C.T.Oliveira & Antar
- Mikania sericea Hook. & Arn.
- Mikania sessilifolia DC.
- Mikania setigera Sch.Bip. ex Baker
- Mikania shushunensis W.C.Holmes & McDaniel
- Mikania siambonensis Hieron.
- Mikania simpsonii W.C.Holmes & McDaniel
- Mikania smaragdina Dusén ex Malme
- Mikania smilacina DC.
- Mikania smithii B.L.Rob.
- Mikania solidinervia V.M.Badillo
- Mikania sordida Al.Rodr.
- Mikania sparrei H.Rob. & W.C.Holmes
- Mikania speciosa DC.
- Mikania sprucei Baker
- Mikania steinbachii B.L.Rob.
- Mikania stenomeres B.L.Rob.
- Mikania stenophylla W.C.Holmes
- Mikania stereodes B.L.Rob.
- Mikania stereolepis B.L.Rob.
- Mikania stevensiana Britton
- Mikania steyermarkii R.M.King & H.Rob.
- Mikania stipulacea (Vahl) Willd.
- Mikania stipulifera L.O.Williams
- Mikania stuebelii Hieron.
- Mikania stygia B.L.Rob.
- Mikania stylosa Gardner
- Mikania subverticillata Sch.Bip. ex Baker
- Mikania sulcata B.L.Rob.
- Mikania summinima W.C.Holmes
- Mikania swartziana Griseb.
- Mikania sylvatica Klatt
- Mikania szyszylowiczii Hieron.

== T ==
- Mikania tafallana Kunth
- Mikania tambillensis Hieron.
- Mikania tehuacanensis W.C.Holmes
- Mikania teixeirae R.M.King & H.Rob.
- Mikania tenax Sch.Bip. ex B.L.Rob.
- Mikania tenella W.C.Holmes
- Mikania ternata (Vell.) B.L.Rob.
- Mikania testudinaria DC.
- Mikania thapsoides DC.
- Mikania thyrsoidea Baker
- Mikania tonduzii B.L.Rob.
- Mikania trachodes B.L.Rob.
- Mikania trachypleura B.L.Rob.
- Mikania triangularis Baker
- Mikania trichophila DC.
- Mikania trimeria W.C.Holmes & McDaniel
- Mikania trinervis Hook. & Arn.
- Mikania trinitaria DC.
- Mikania tripartita Urb.
- Mikania triphylla Spreng. ex Baker
- Mikania tristachya W.C.Holmes
- Mikania troyana Urb.
- Mikania turbaricola W.C.Holmes & McDaniel
- Mikania tysonii R.M.King & H.Rob.

== U ==
- Mikania ulei Hieron.
- Mikania urcuensis H.Rob. & W.C.Holmes
- Mikania urticifolia Hook. & Arn.

== V ==
- Mikania variifolia Hieron.
- Mikania vaupesensis W.C.Holmes & McDaniel
- Mikania vauthieriana Baker
- Mikania venosa Alain
- Mikania verapazensis R.M.King & H.Rob.
- Mikania viminea DC.
- Mikania violascens (B.L.Rob.) R.M.King & H.Rob.
- Mikania violifolia Cuatrec.
- Mikania virgata B.L.Rob.
- Mikania vismiifolia DC.
- Mikania vitifolia DC.

== W ==
- Mikania warmingii Sch.Bip. ex Baker
- Mikania weberbaueri Hieron.
- Mikania websteri H.Rob. & W.C.Holmes
- Mikania wedelii W.C.Holmes & McDaniel
- Mikania werdermannii B.L.Rob.
- Mikania williamsii B.L.Rob.
- Mikania woytkowskii W.C.Holmes & McDaniel
- Mikania wurdackii Pruski & W.C.Holmes

== Y ==
- Mikania yanacochensis H.Rob. & W.C.Holmes

== Z ==
- Mikania zamorae H.Rob. & W.C.Holmes
