= Coulterophytum =

Scientific classification
- Kingdom: Plantae
- Clade: Tracheophytes
- Clade: Angiosperms
- Clade: Eudicots
- Clade: Asterids
- Order: Apiales
- Family: Apiaceae
- Subfamily: Apioideae
- Tribe: Selineae
- Genus: Coulterophytum; B.L.Rob.

Genus of flowering plants

Coulterophytum is a genus of flowering plants belonging to the family Apiaceae.

Its native range is Western Mexico.

Species:

- Coulterophytum holwayi Rose
- Coulterophytum laxum B.L.Rob.
- Coulterophytum macrophyllum J.M.Coult. & Rose
- Coulterophytum pubescens J.M.Coult. & Rose
