= Grosvenoria =

Scientific classification
- Kingdom: Plantae
- Clade: Embryophytes
- Clade: Tracheophytes
- Clade: Spermatophytes
- Clade: Angiosperms
- Clade: Eudicots
- Clade: Asterids
- Order: Asterales
- Family: Asteraceae
- Subfamily: Asteroideae
- Tribe: Eupatorieae
- Genus: Grosvenoria; R.M.King & H.Rob.

Type species
- Eupatorium rimbachii B.L.Rob.

Genus of flowering plants

Grosvenoria is a genus of South American shrubs and small trees in the family Asteraceae. They are native to the Andes, from central Ecuador to northern Peru at elevations of 2,700 to 3,700 metres (8,900 to 12,100 ft).

Species

- Grosvenoria campii R.M.King & H.Rob.
- Grosvenoria coelocaulis (B.L.Rob.) R.M.King & H.Rob.
- Grosvenoria hypargyra (B.L.Rob.) R.M.King & H.Rob.
- Grosvenoria jelskii (Hieron.) R.M.King & H.Rob.
- Grosvenoria lopezii H.Rob.
- Grosvenoria rimbachii (B.L.Rob.) R.M.King & H.Rob.
- Grosvenoria zamorensis H.Rob.
