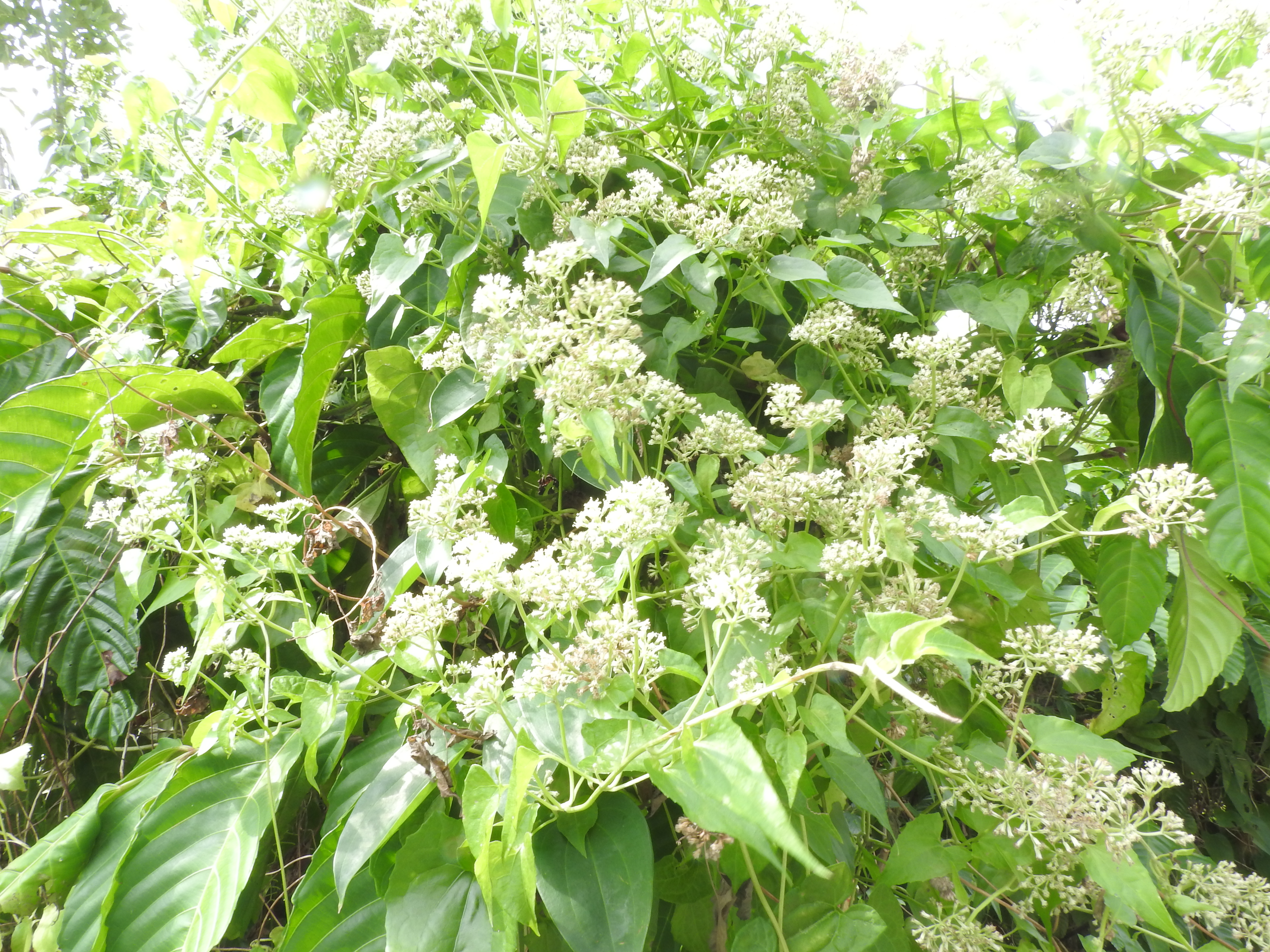
- On South Andaman Island
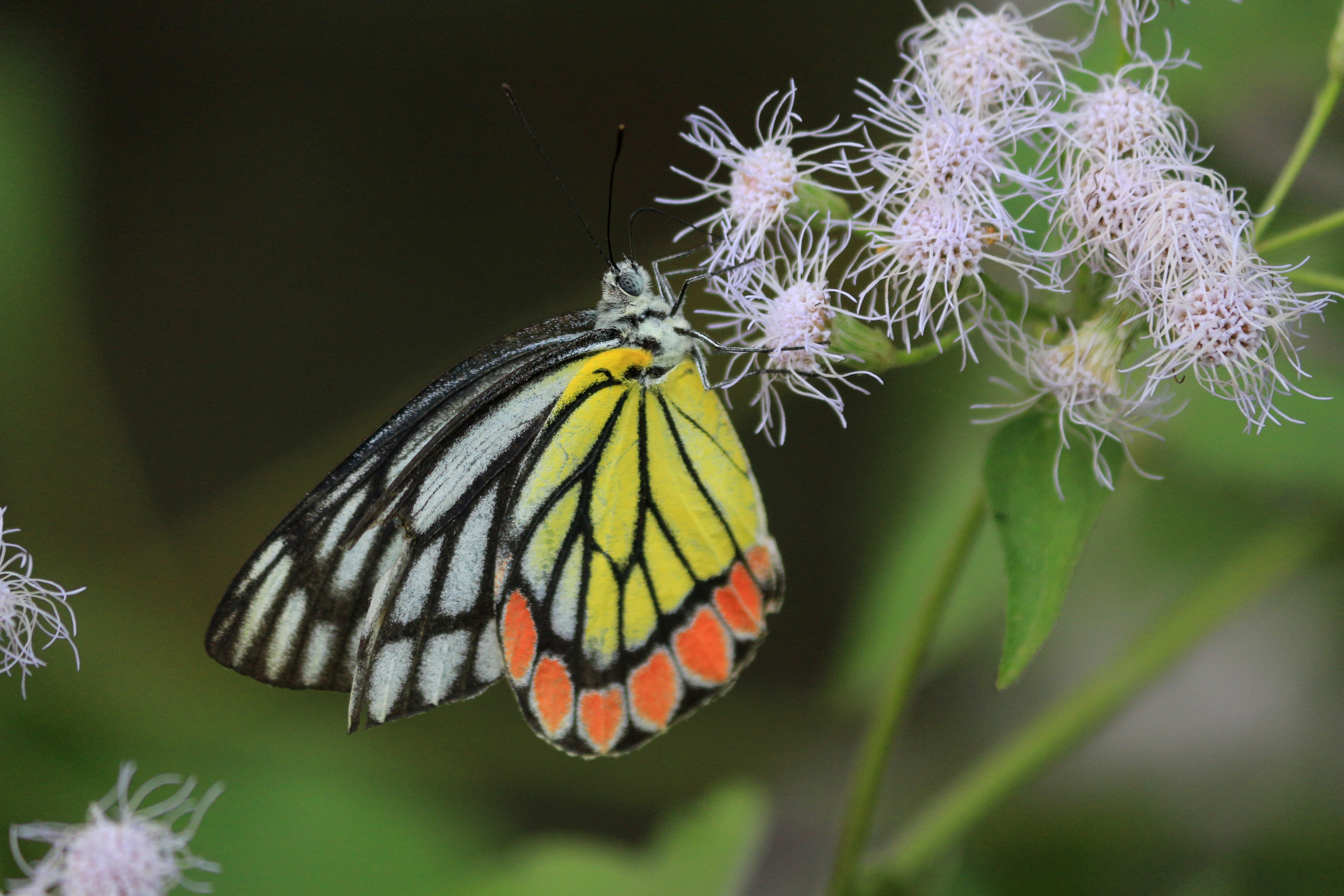
- Flowers being probed by a common Jezebel

Scientific classification
- Kingdom: Plantae
- Clade: Tracheophytes
- Clade: Angiosperms
- Clade: Eudicots
- Clade: Asterids
- Order: Asterales
- Family: Asteraceae
- Genus: Mikania
- Species: M. cordata

Binomial name
- Mikania cordata (Burm.f.) B.L.Rob.

Synonyms
- Eupatorium cordatum Burm.f.; Eupatorium trinitarium var. volubile M.Gómez; Eupatorium volubile Vahl; Mikania carteri Baker; Mikania volubilis (Vahl) Willd.

= Mikania cordata =

Species of plant

Mikania cordata, the African mile-a-minute or heartleaf hempvine, is a species of flowering plant in the family Asteraceae, disjunctly distributed across the Old World Tropics. A perennial twining vine reaching 10 m (33 ft) long, it grows in thickets and forests at elevations from 100 to 1,700 m (300 to 5,600 ft), at least in China. It is a rapidly-growing climber that suppresses the growth of other plants (including kudzu) and is considered a more dangerous noxious weed than Mikania micrantha. Local peoples occasionally consume its leaves and use it for erosion control.
