= Neomirandea angularis =

Scientific classification
- Kingdom: Plantae
- Clade: Tracheophytes
- Clade: Angiosperms
- Clade: Eudicots
- Clade: Asterids
- Order: Asterales
- Family: Asteraceae
- Genus: Neomirandea
- Species: N. angularis

Binomial name
- Neomirandea angularis (B.L.Rob.) R.M.King & H.Rob.

Synonyms
- Eupatorium angulare B.L.Rob.; Eupatorium fistulosum B.L.Rob.

Species of flowering plant

Neomirandea angularis is a flowering tree of the daisy family (Asteraceae) that is endemic to Costa Rica. The tree is up to 8 m (26 ft) in height with lobed leaves up to 40 cm (20 in) in length with additionally a 25 cm (9.8 in) petiole. The purple daisies are in a roundish cluster of up to twelve heads.
