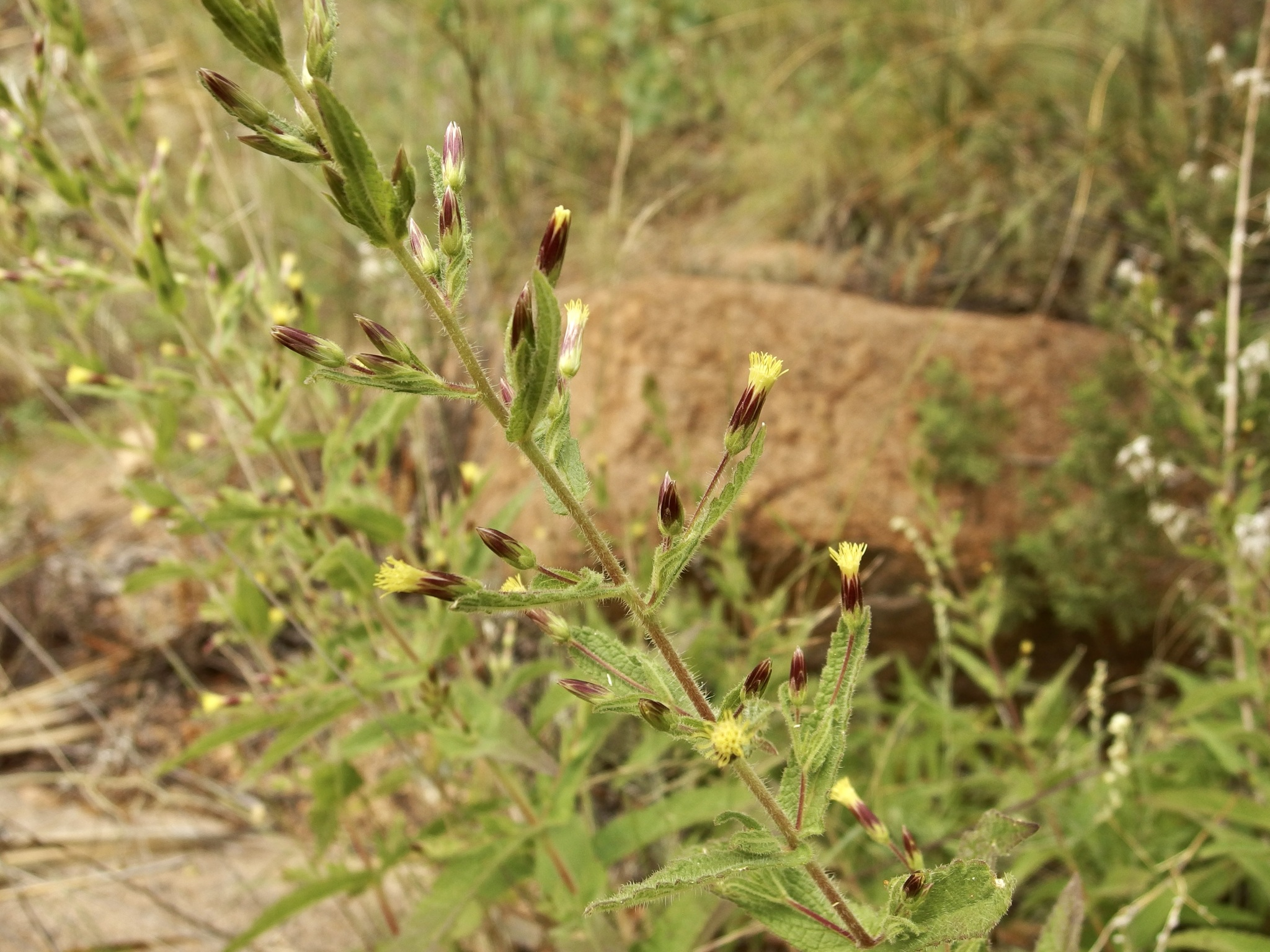

Scientific classification
- Kingdom: Plantae
- Clade: Tracheophytes
- Clade: Angiosperms
- Clade: Eudicots
- Clade: Asterids
- Order: Asterales
- Family: Asteraceae
- Genus: Brickellia
- Species: B. amplexicaulis

Binomial name
- Brickellia amplexicaulis B.L.Rob.

Synonyms
- Brickellia wislizeni var. lanceolata A.Gray 1884; Coleosanthus amplexicaulis (B.L.Rob.) Ortega

= Brickellia amplexicaulis =

Species of flowering plant

Brickellia amplexicaulis, the earleaf brickellbush, is a North American species of flowering plants in the family Asteraceae. It is native to northwestern and north-central Mexico (Sonora, Sinaloa, Chihuahua) and also to the southwestern United States (Arizona and southwestern New Mexico (Hidalgo County)).

Brickellia amplexicaulis is a branching shrub up to 200 cm (80 inches) tall. Its leaves partially surround the stems. The plant produces many small flower heads with yellow or cream-colored disc florets but no ray florets.
