= Mikania millei =

Conservation status
- Endangered (IUCN 3.1)

Scientific classification
- Kingdom: Plantae
- Clade: Embryophytes
- Clade: Tracheophytes
- Clade: Spermatophytes
- Clade: Angiosperms
- Clade: Eudicots
- Clade: Asterids
- Order: Asterales
- Family: Asteraceae
- Genus: Mikania
- Species: M. millei

Binomial name
- Mikania millei B.L.Rob.

Species of flowering plant

Mikania millei, the poroto angu, is a species of flowering plant in the family Asteraceae. It is endemic to Ecuador. Its natural habitat is subtropical or tropical high-elevation grassland. It is threatened by habitat loss.
