= Liothrips urichi =

Scientific classification
- Kingdom: Animalia
- Phylum: Arthropoda
- Class: Insecta
- Order: Thysanoptera
- Family: Phlaeothripidae
- Genus: Liothrips
- Species: L. urichi

Binomial name
- Liothrips urichi Karny, 1923

Species of thrip

The Clidemia thrips, Liothrips urichi, is a thrips species from Trinidad. It is used as a biological control agent to stop the spread of Clidemia hirta (Koster's curse), an invasive plant species that does much damage in many tropical areas of the world.

L. urichi was first employed on Fiji in 1930. It was introduced and released in Hawai'i in 1953, where, two months later, it was reproducing on C. hirta and was considered established. This introduction terminated the problem in pasturelands, but C. hirta remains a problem in heavily shaded forests where L. urichi does not normally establish itself.

Infested tips of C. hirta may contain all stages of L. urichi but larvae tend to cause the most damage. The thrips can control mature C. hirta by attacking young succulent growth causing tip die-back.
