= Liothrips =

Scientific classification
- Domain: Eukaryota
- Kingdom: Animalia
- Phylum: Arthropoda
- Class: Insecta
- Order: Thysanoptera
- Family: Phlaeothripidae
- Subfamily: Phlaeothripinae
- Genus: Liothrips; Uzel, 1895

Species
- Approx. 300, including: L. brevitubus L. floridensis L. oleae L. piperinus L. sambuci L. urichi L. vaneeckei L. varicornis L. wasabiae

Diversity
- 289 species

Genus of thrips

Liothrips is a genus of thrips with almost 300 described species. They are ordered into three subgenera, Epiliothrips (2 species), Liothrips (262 species) and Zopyrothrips (25 species).

The Clidemia thrips Liothrips urichi is used as a control agent to stop the spread of Clidemia hirta in Hawaii.

== Species ==
Subgenus Epiliothrips Priesner, 1965

- Liothrips postocularis
- Liothrips willcocksi

Subgenus Liothrips Uzel, 1895

- Liothrips aberrans
- Liothrips abstrusus
- Liothrips acuminatus
- Liothrips adisi
- Liothrips adusticornis
- Liothrips aemulans
- Liothrips aequilus
- Liothrips aethiops
- Liothrips africanus
- Liothrips amabilis
- Liothrips amoenus
- Liothrips ampelopsidis
- Liothrips ananthakrishnani
- Liothrips annulifer
- Liothrips anogeissi
- Liothrips anonae
- Liothrips antennatus
- Liothrips apicatus
- Liothrips araliae
- Liothrips arrogantis
- Liothrips assimulans
- Liothrips associatus
- Liothrips ater
- Liothrips atratus
- Liothrips atricapillus
- Liothrips atricolor
- Liothrips avocadis
- Liothrips aztecus
- Liothrips baccati
- Liothrips badius
- Liothrips barronis
- Liothrips bibbyi
- Liothrips bireni
- Liothrips bispinosus
- Liothrips bomiensis
- Liothrips bondari
- Liothrips bosei
- Liothrips bournieri
- Liothrips bournierorum
- Liothrips brasiliensis
- Liothrips brevicollis
- Liothrips brevicornis
- Liothrips brevifemur
- Liothrips brevitubus
- Liothrips brevitubus
- Liothrips brevitubus
- Liothrips buffae
- Liothrips capnodes
- Liothrips caryae
- Liothrips castaneae
- Liothrips cecidii
- Liothrips champakae
- Liothrips chavicae
- Liothrips chinensis
- Liothrips citricornis
- Liothrips citricornis
- Liothrips clarus
- Liothrips cognatus
- Liothrips colimae
- Liothrips collustratus
- Liothrips condei
- Liothrips confusus
- Liothrips convergens
- Liothrips cordiae
- Liothrips corni
- Liothrips crassipes
- Liothrips cunctans
- Liothrips cuspidatae
- Liothrips debilis
- Liothrips dentifer
- Liothrips devriesi
- Liothrips didymopanicis
- Liothrips digressus
- Liothrips dissochaetae
- Liothrips distinctus
- Liothrips diwasabiae
- Liothrips dumosus
- Liothrips dux
- Liothrips elaeocarpi
- Liothrips elatostemae
- Liothrips emulatus
- Liothrips epacrus
- Liothrips epimeralis
- Liothrips eremicus
- Liothrips errabundus
- Liothrips euryae
- Liothrips exiguus
- Liothrips exilis
- Liothrips fagraeae
- Liothrips flavescens
- Liothrips flavipes
- Liothrips flavitibia
- Liothrips floridensis
- Liothrips fluggeae
- Liothrips fragilis
- Liothrips fraudulentus
- Liothrips fulmekianus
- Liothrips fumicornis
- Liothrips fungi
- Liothrips furvus
- Liothrips fuscus
- Liothrips gaviotae
- Liothrips genualis
- Liothrips glycinicola
- Liothrips gymnosporiae
- Liothrips gynopogoni
- Liothrips hagai
- Liothrips heptapleurinus
- Liothrips himalayanus
- Liothrips horutonoki
- Liothrips hyalinipennis
- Liothrips ilex
- Liothrips indicus
- Liothrips infrequens
- Liothrips inquilinus
- Liothrips insidiosus
- Liothrips interlocatus
- Liothrips invisus
- Liothrips jakhontovi
- Liothrips jazykovi
- Liothrips jogensis
- Liothrips kannani
- Liothrips karnyi
- Liothrips kingi
- Liothrips kolliensis
- Liothrips kurosawai
- Liothrips kusunoki
- Liothrips kuwanai
- Liothrips kuwayamai
- Liothrips laingi
- Liothrips laureli
- Liothrips lepidus
- Liothrips leucopus
- Liothrips litsaeae
- Liothrips longiceps
- Liothrips longicornis
- Liothrips longitubus
- Liothrips loranthi
- Liothrips luzonensis
- Liothrips macgregori
- Liothrips machilus
- Liothrips major
- Liothrips malabaricus
- Liothrips matudai
- Liothrips mayumi
- Liothrips melanarius
- Liothrips mendesi
- Liothrips mexicanus
- Liothrips mikaniae
- Liothrips miniati
- Liothrips minys
- Liothrips mirabilis
- Liothrips miyatakei
- Liothrips miyazakii
- Liothrips mohanrami
- Liothrips monae
- Liothrips monoensis
- Liothrips monsterae
- Liothrips montanus
- Liothrips morindae
- Liothrips morulus
- Liothrips moultoni
- Liothrips mucronis
- Liothrips muralii
- Liothrips muscorum
- Liothrips nanus
- Liothrips neosmerinthi
- Liothrips nigriculus
- Liothrips nubilis
- Liothrips obscurus
- Liothrips ocellatus
- Liothrips oculatus
- Liothrips oleae
- Liothrips omphalopinus
- Liothrips orchidis
- Liothrips palasae
- Liothrips pallicornis
- Liothrips pallicrus
- Liothrips pallipes
- Liothrips parcus
- Liothrips penetralis
- Liothrips perandaphaga
- Liothrips perseae
- Liothrips peruviensis
- Liothrips piger
- Liothrips piperinus
- Liothrips pistaciae
- Liothrips polybotryae
- Liothrips polyosminus
- Liothrips praelongus
- Liothrips pragensis
- Liothrips priesneri
- Liothrips pruni
- Liothrips querci
- Liothrips ramakrishnae
- Liothrips raoensis
- Liothrips rectigenis
- Liothrips renukae
- Liothrips retrofracti
- Liothrips retusus
- Liothrips reynvaanae
- Liothrips rhaphidophorae
- Liothrips rohdeae
- Liothrips rostratus
- Liothrips rubiae
- Liothrips russelli
- Liothrips salti
- Liothrips sambuci
- Liothrips sangali
- Liothrips sanxianensis
- Liothrips sarmentosi
- Liothrips satanas
- Liothrips scotti
- Liothrips seshadrii
- Liothrips seticollis
- Liothrips setinodis
- Liothrips shii
- Liothrips shishiudo
- Liothrips sibajakensis
- Liothrips silvestrii
- Liothrips similis
- Liothrips sinarundinariae
- Liothrips smeeanus
- Liothrips soembanus
- Liothrips soror
- Liothrips striaticeps
- Liothrips styracinus
- Liothrips suavis
- Liothrips sulcifrons
- Liothrips tabascensis
- Liothrips takahashii
- Liothrips tandiliensis
- Liothrips tarsidens
- Liothrips tenuicornis
- Liothrips tenuis
- Liothrips terminaliae
- Liothrips tersus
- Liothrips tertius
- Liothrips tessariae
- Liothrips tibialis
- Liothrips tridentatus
- Liothrips tropicus
- Liothrips tsutsumii
- Liothrips tupac
- Liothrips turkestanicus
- Liothrips umbripennis
- Liothrips unicolor
- Liothrips urichi
- Liothrips usitatus
- Liothrips vaneeckei
- Liothrips variabilis
- Liothrips varicornis
- Liothrips vernoniae
- Liothrips versicolor
- Liothrips vichitravarna
- Liothrips vigilax
- Liothrips wangjinensis
- Liothrips wasabiae
- Liothrips wittmeri
- Liothrips xanthocerus
- Liothrips zeteki

Subgenus Zopyrothrips Priesner, 1968

- Liothrips astutus
- Liothrips claripennis
- Liothrips comparandus
- Liothrips extractus
- Liothrips fumipennis
- Liothrips heptapleuri
- Liothrips heptapleuricola
- Liothrips ingratus
- Liothrips jacobsoni
- Liothrips latro
- Liothrips litoralis
- Liothrips macropanacis
- Liothrips maximus
- Liothrips nervisequus
- Liothrips nigripes
- Liothrips praetermissus
- Liothrips racemosae
- Liothrips schefflerae
- Liothrips simillimus
- Liothrips sordidus
- Liothrips spectabilis
- Liothrips taurus
- Liothrips tetrastigmae
- Liothrips viticola
- Liothrips vitivorus
