= Guaco =

Grouping of some Caribbean, Central and South American plants

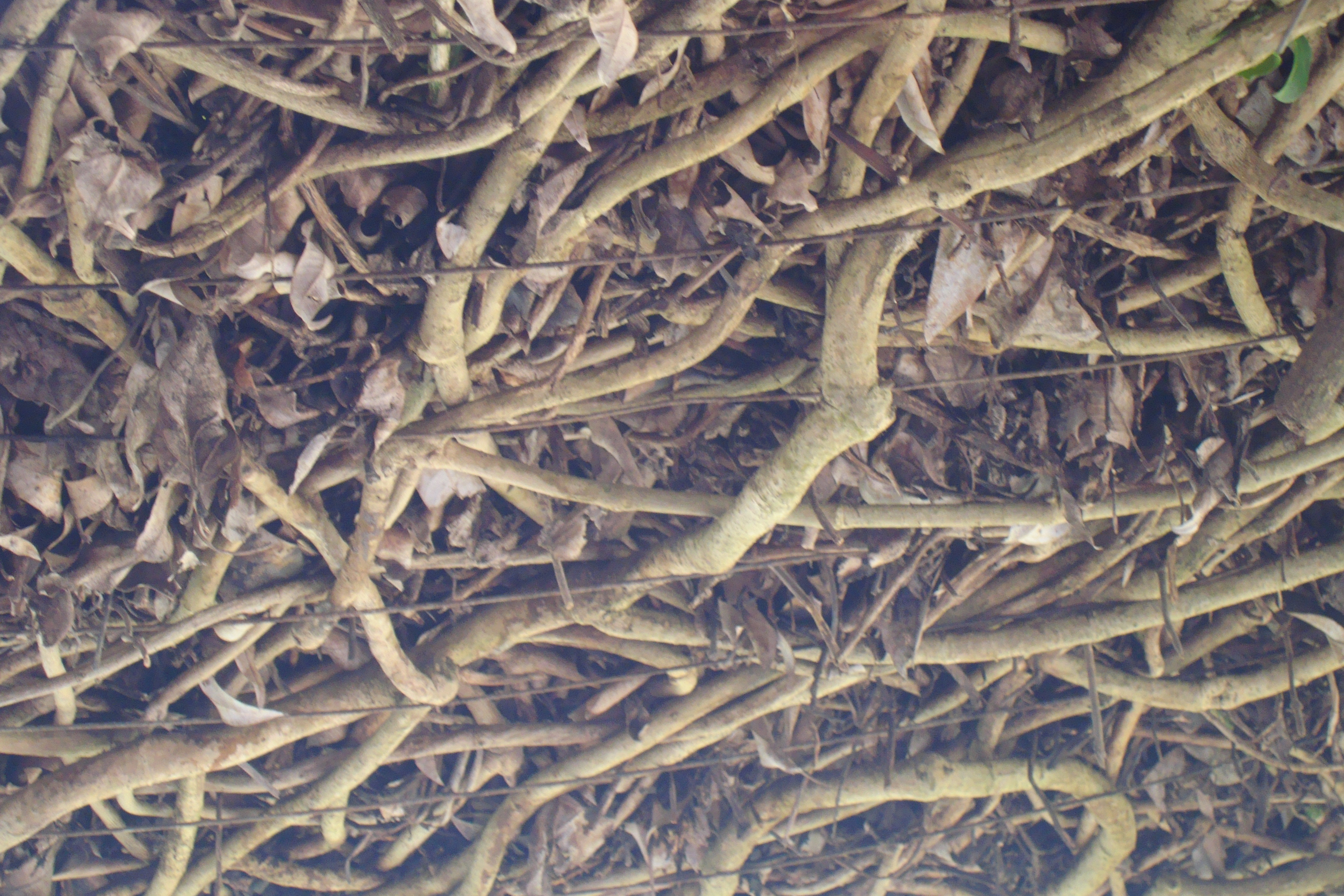
Guaco (Mikania glomerata)

Guaco, huaco, vejuco and bejuco (Note: As its strong stems are also used for flagellation, the word bejuco also means whip.) are terms applied to various vine-like Central American, South American, and West Indian climbing plants, reputed to have curative powers. Several species in the genus Mikania are among those referred to as guaco. Even though it is not a vine guaco is also used to refer to Cleome serrulata, the Rocky Mountain beeplant.

Native Americans and Colombians believe that the guaco was named after a species of kite, in imitation of its cry, which they say it uses to attract the snakes which it feeds on. Tradition says that the plant's powers as an antidote were discovered through watching the bird eat the leaves, and even spread the juice on its wings, before attacking the snakes.

Any twining plant with a heart-shaped leaf, white and green above and purple beneath, is called a guaco by Native Americans, which does not necessarily coincide with which plants are "true" guacos, as far as naturalists are concerned.

What is most commonly recognized in Colombia as guaco, or vejuco del guaco, would appear to be Mikania guaco, a climbing composite plant of the tribe Eupatorieae, preferring moist and shady situations, and having a much-branched and deep-growing root, variegated, serrated, opposite leaves and dull white flowers, in axillary clusters. The whole plant emits a disagreeable odour.

== Uses ==
It was stated that the Central American natives, after taking guaco, catch with impunity the most dangerous snakes, which writhe in their hands as though touched by a hot iron. The odour alone of guaco, has been said to cause, in snakes, a state of stupor; and Humboldt, who observed that proximity of a rod steeped in guaco-juice was obnoxious to the venomous Coluber corallinus, was of the opinion that inoculation with it gives perspiration an odour which makes reptiles unwilling to bite. The drug is not used in modern medicine.

In Brazil, guaco (Mikania glomerata) is commonly used as a medicinal tea as an expectorant and anti-inflammatory due to its compound coumarin.
