= Grosvenoria hypargyra =

Conservation status
- Vulnerable (IUCN 3.1)

Scientific classification
- Kingdom: Plantae
- Clade: Tracheophytes
- Clade: Angiosperms
- Clade: Eudicots
- Clade: Asterids
- Order: Asterales
- Family: Asteraceae
- Genus: Grosvenoria
- Species: G. hypargyra

Binomial name
- Grosvenoria hypargyra (B.L.Rob.) R.M.King & H.Rob.

Species of flowering plant

Grosvenoria hypargyra is a species of flowering plant in the family Asteraceae. It is found only in Ecuador. Its natural habitats are subtropical or tropical moist montane forests and subtropical or tropical high-altitude shrubland. It is threatened by habitat loss.
