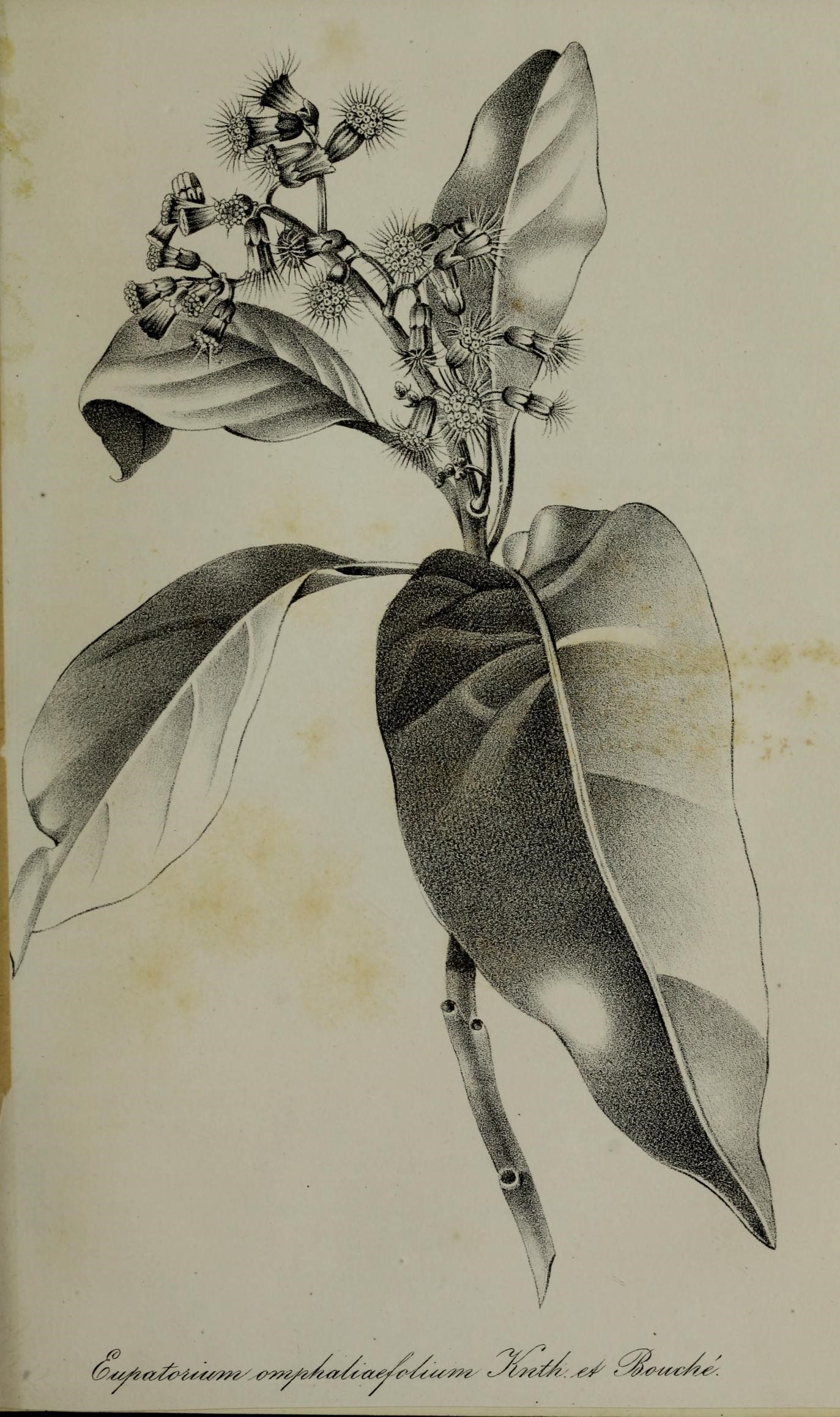
- Neomirandea araliaefolia

Scientific classification
- Kingdom: Plantae
- Clade: Tracheophytes
- Clade: Angiosperms
- Clade: Eudicots
- Clade: Asterids
- Order: Asterales
- Family: Asteraceae
- Subfamily: Asteroideae
- Tribe: Eupatorieae
- Genus: Neomirandea; R.M.King & H.Rob.

Type species
- Eupatorium araliaefolium Less.

= Neomirandea =

Genus of flowering plants

Neomirandea is a genus of Central American and South American flowering plants in the boneset tribe within the sunflower family.

Species

- Neomirandea allenii R.M.King & H.Rob.
- Neomirandea angularis (B.L.Rob.) R.M.King & H.Rob.
- Neomirandea araliaefolia (Less.) R.M.King & H.Rob.
- Neomirandea araliifolia (Less.) R.M.King & H.Rob.
- Neomirandea arthodes (B.L.Rob.) R.M.King & H.Rob.
- Neomirandea biflora R.M.King & H.Rob.
- Neomirandea burgeri R.M.King & H.Rob.
- Neomirandea carnosa (Kuntze) R.M.King & H.Rob.
- Neomirandea chiriquensis R.M.King & H.Rob.
- Neomirandea costaricensis R.M.King & H.Rob.
- Neomirandea croatii R.M.King & H.Rob.
- Neomirandea cuatrecasana S.Díaz
- Neomirandea eximia (B.L.Rob.) R.M.King & H.Rob.
- Neomirandea folsomiana M.O.Dillon & D'Arcy
- Neomirandea gracilis R.M.King & H.Rob.
- Neomirandea grosvenorii R.M.King & H.Rob.
- Neomirandea guevarii R.M.King & H.Rob.
- Neomirandea homogama (Hieron.) H.Rob. & Brettell
- Neomirandea ovandensis R.M.King & H.Rob.
- Neomirandea panamensis R.M.King & H.Rob.
- Neomirandea parasitica (Klatt) R.M.King & H.Rob.
- Neomirandea pendulissima Al.Rodr.
- Neomirandea pithecobia (B.L.Rob.) R.M.King & H.Rob.
- Neomirandea pseudopsoralea R.M.King & H.Rob.
- Neomirandea psoralea (B.L.Rob.) R.M.King & H.Rob.
- Neomirandea sciaphila (B.L.Rob.) R.M.King & H.Rob.
- Neomirandea standleyi (B.L.Rob.) R.M.King & H.Rob.
- Neomirandea tenuipes R.M.King & H.Rob.
- Neomirandea ternata R.M.King & H.Rob.
- Neomirandea turrialbae R.M.King & H.Rob.
