= Mikania oreophila =

Scientific classification
- Kingdom: Plantae
- Clade: Tracheophytes
- Clade: Angiosperms
- Clade: Eudicots
- Clade: Asterids
- Order: Asterales
- Family: Asteraceae
- Genus: Mikania
- Species: M. oreophila

Binomial name
- Mikania oreophila M.R.Ritter & Miotto

Species of flowering plant

Mikania oreophila is a plant species native to southern Brazil. It has been collected from highland areas in the States of Rio Grande do Sul, Paraná, Santa Catarina and São Paulo from elevations up to 1300 m.

Mikania oreophila is a twining liana that climbs over other vegetation. Leaves are simple, opposite, with petioles up to 25 mm long; blades 3-lobed, up to 9 cm long, the terminal lobe three times as long as the two lateral lobes, all three narrowing to a sharp point at the tip. Flowering heads are in terminal or axillary panicles. Heads up to 8 mm tall, with no ray flowers and only 3-5 disc flowers.
