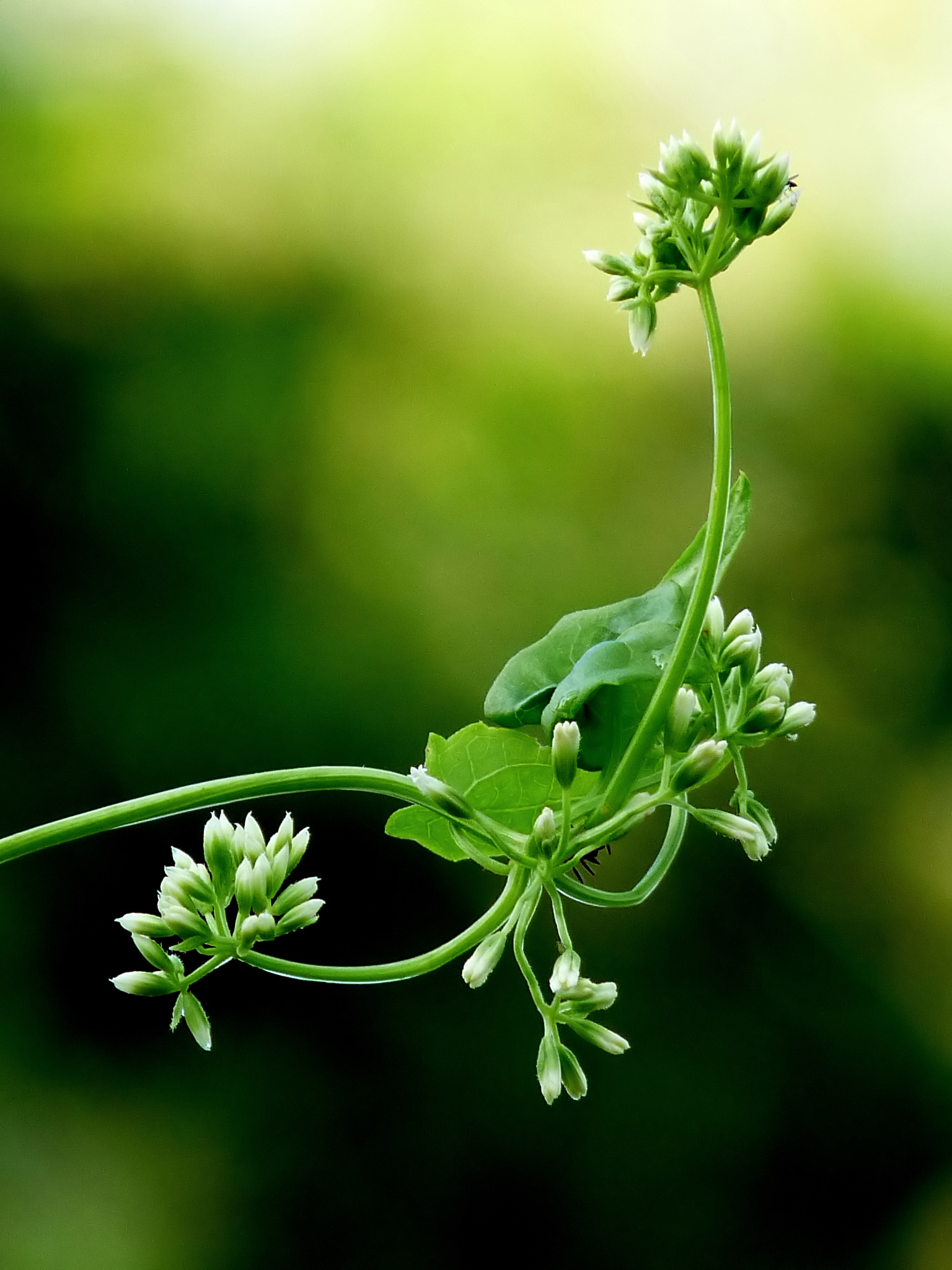

Scientific classification
- Kingdom: Plantae
- Clade: Tracheophytes
- Clade: Angiosperms
- Clade: Eudicots
- Clade: Asterids
- Order: Asterales
- Family: Asteraceae
- Genus: Mikania
- Species: M. micrantha

Binomial name
- Mikania micrantha Kunth

= Mikania micrantha =

Species of flowering plant

Mikania micrantha is a tropical plant in the family Asteraceae; known as bitter vine, climbing hemp vine, or American rope. It is also sometimes called mile-a-minute vine (a moniker also used for the unrelated Persicaria perfoliata).

It is a vigorously growing perennial creeper that grows best in areas in high humidity, light and soil fertility, though it can adapt in less fertile soils. The featherlike seeds are dispersed by wind. A single stalk can produce between 20 and 40 thousand seeds a season.

The species is native to the sub-tropical zones of North, Central, and South America.

== Description ==
Mikania micrantha has ribbed stems that grow up to 6 metres (20 ft) in length with 4–13-centimetre (1.6–5.1 in) long leaves that have a heart-shaped base and a pointed apex. 4.5–6.0-millimetre (0.18–0.24 in) white flowers grow in clusters.

== Invasive species ==
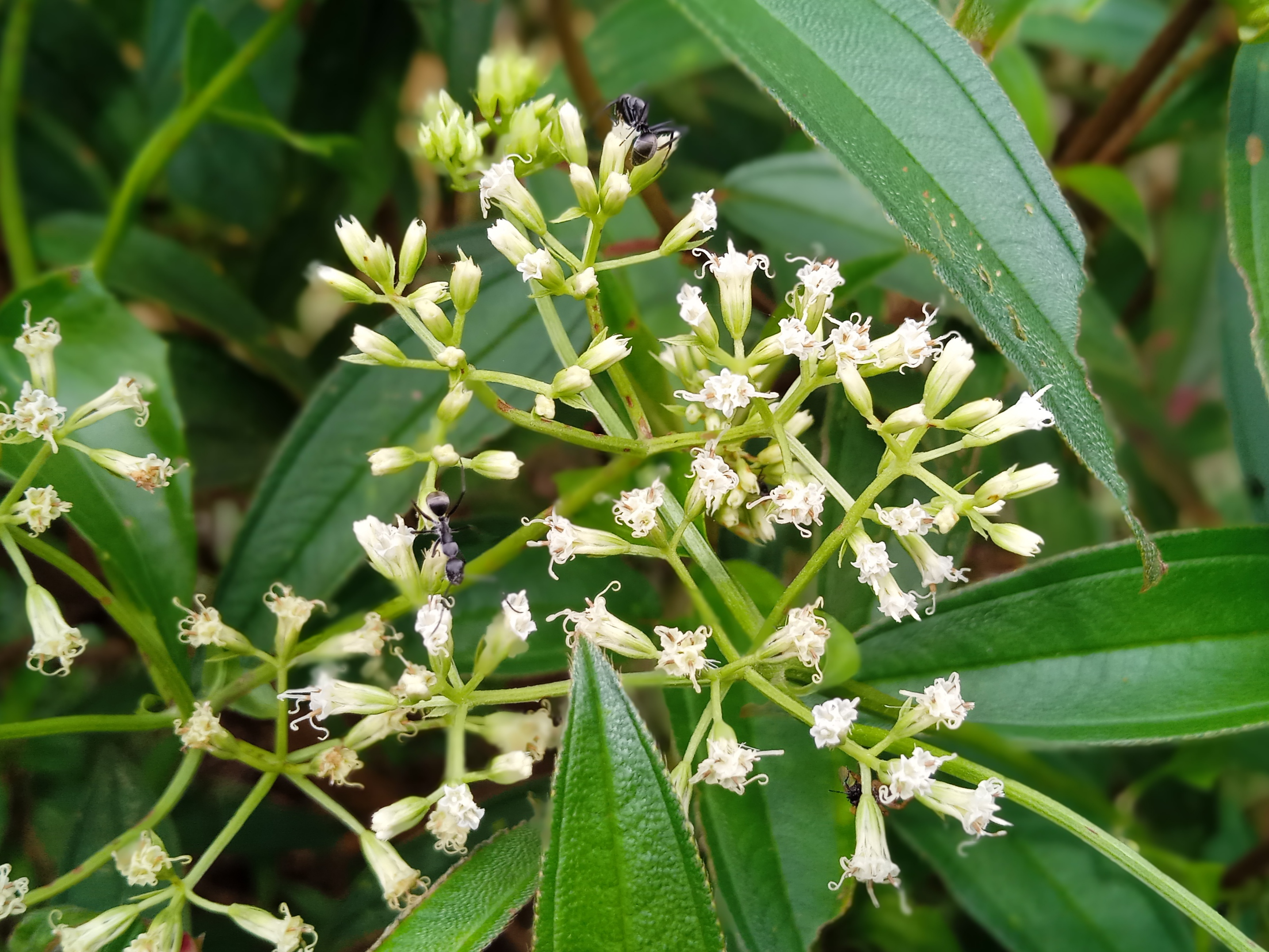
M. micrantha

Mikania micrantha is a widespread weed in the tropics. It grows very quickly (as fast as 80 to 90 millimetres (3.1 to 3.5 in) in 24 hours for a young plant) and covers other plants, shrubs and even trees. Mikania is a problem in Nepal, covering more than 20% of the Chitwan National Park.

Various control measures against Mikania have been tried in many countries. It is moderately susceptible to the herbicides 2,4-D and 2,4,5-T and paraquat. Cuscuta, a parasitic plant, has been used in Assam and Sri Lanka to suppress the spread of Mikania from waste land to tea plantations. Other control measures include the rust fungus Puccinia spegazzinii and the thrips species Liothrips mikaniae.

An example of its success can be seen in Hong Kong where first recorded in 1884, it has now spread throughout the region and invades its country parks.

Economic gains due to Mikania are meager compared to the loss due to its infestation in various ecosystems. It is used as a fodder in many countries. Sheep preferentially grazed Mikania in Malaysia and other cattle also relish it. In Kerala, India, the weed is utilized as a fodder in some parts of the state, especially during summer when the availability of grass is scarce. However, Mikania is known to cause hepatotoxicity and liver damage in dairy cattle. The antibacterial effect of Mikania and its efficacy in wound healing has been reported. In Assam (NE India), Kabi tribes use the leaf juice of Mikania as an antidote for insect bite and scorpion sting. The leaves are also used for treating stomachache. Use of juice of Mikania as a curative agent for itches is reported from Malaysia. However, in all such cases, therapeutic evidence are scarce or lacking. In Africa, Mikania leaves are used as a vegetable for making soups. The weed is used as a cover crop in rubber plantations in Malaysia. It is also planted on slopes to prevent soil erosion. Mikania green manure has been reported to increase the yield of rice in Mizoram, India. Recent studies have shown that Mikania is not suitable for mulching and composting due to its high water content.

== Allelopathy ==
Extracts from M. micrantha slow the germination and growth of a variety of plant species. At least three sesquiterpenoids have been identified which produce this effect.

== Diseases ==
Mikania micrantha is affected by a virus called Mikania micrantha wilt virus (MMWV), which is a Fabavirus.

== Medicinal uses ==
It is used to heal cuts and stop minor external bleeding in Fiji but its medicinal properties are still yet to be fully discovered. It is also a very popular local antiseptic medicine in Mizoram State of India, it is known locally as Japan Hlo. Its use has also been reported in the state of Arunachal Pradesh; fresh leaves are pounded and then applied over lacerations to stop bleeding and subsequent healing. In Bangladesh used to treat gastric ulcer and as a local antiseptic.

The antioxidant activity and anthelmintic (anti-parasitic) activity of Mikania micrantha leaves has been studied.
