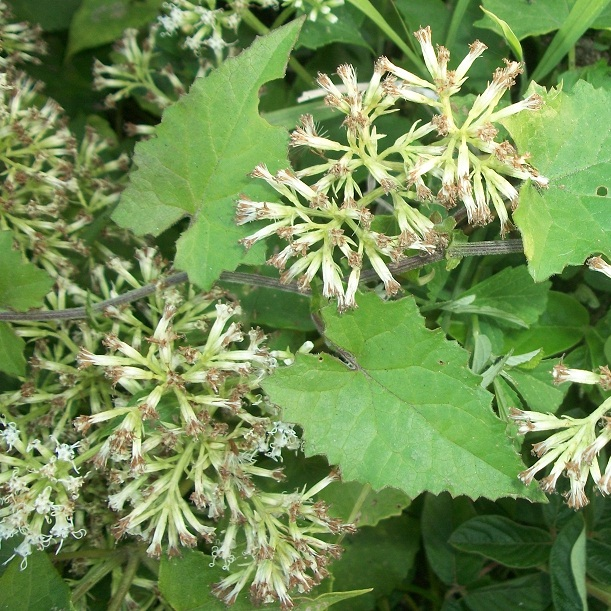

Scientific classification
- Kingdom: Plantae
- Clade: Tracheophytes
- Clade: Angiosperms
- Clade: Eudicots
- Clade: Asterids
- Order: Asterales
- Family: Asteraceae
- Genus: Mikania
- Species: M. natalensis

Binomial name
- Mikania natalensis DC.

= Mikania natalensis =

Species of flowering plant

Mikania natalensis, the Natal mikania, is a plant in the family Asteraceae, and is native to Africa.

== Description ==
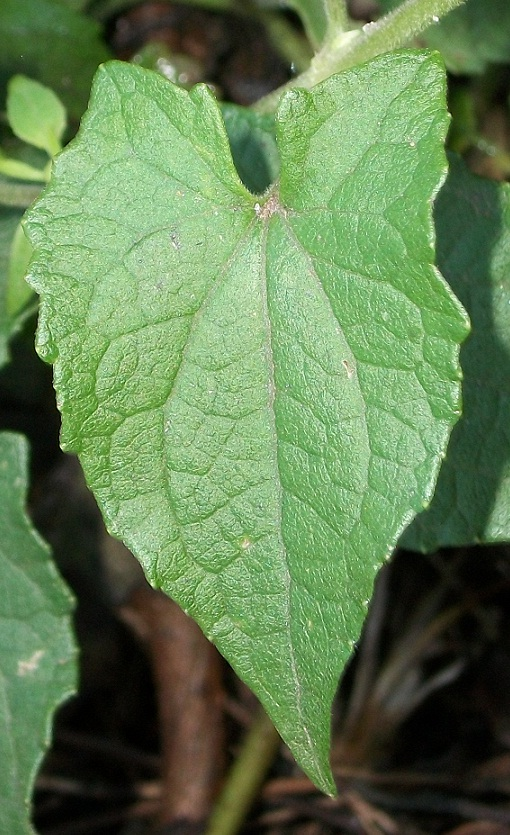
Leaf of Mikania natalensis

Mikania natalensis is a herbaceous, vigorous perennial climber. The leaves are opposite and well spaced. The leaf stalk is up to 30 mm long. The leaf blade is about 80 mm by 40 mm, triangular, long-pointed, with pointed backward extensions. The leaf margin is widely (and irregularly) toothed. There are five veins in the leaf from the base. The leaves are velvety grey beneath, and thinly pubescent above. Flowers are 10 mm long, cream-coloured with purplish anthers and white corollas; in loosely branched inflorescences. The flowers are heavily scented and produced from April through September.

Mikania natalensis is superficially similar in appearance to Chromolaena odorata, which is an alien invader species in the natural habitat of Mikania natalensis. The butterfly Actinote thalia was considered for the biological control of Chromolaena odorata in southern Africa, but permission to release this control agent was not sought because the larvae were found to consume the leaves of Mikania natalensis.

== Distribution and habitat ==
It is found on forest margins from the Eastern Cape of South Africa to Tropical Africa.

== Ecology ==
The flowers are visited by butterflies, bees, wasps and flies.

== Human uses ==
Mikania natalensis is used in traditional Zulu and Swazi medicine for urinary complaints, headaches, backache and colds.
