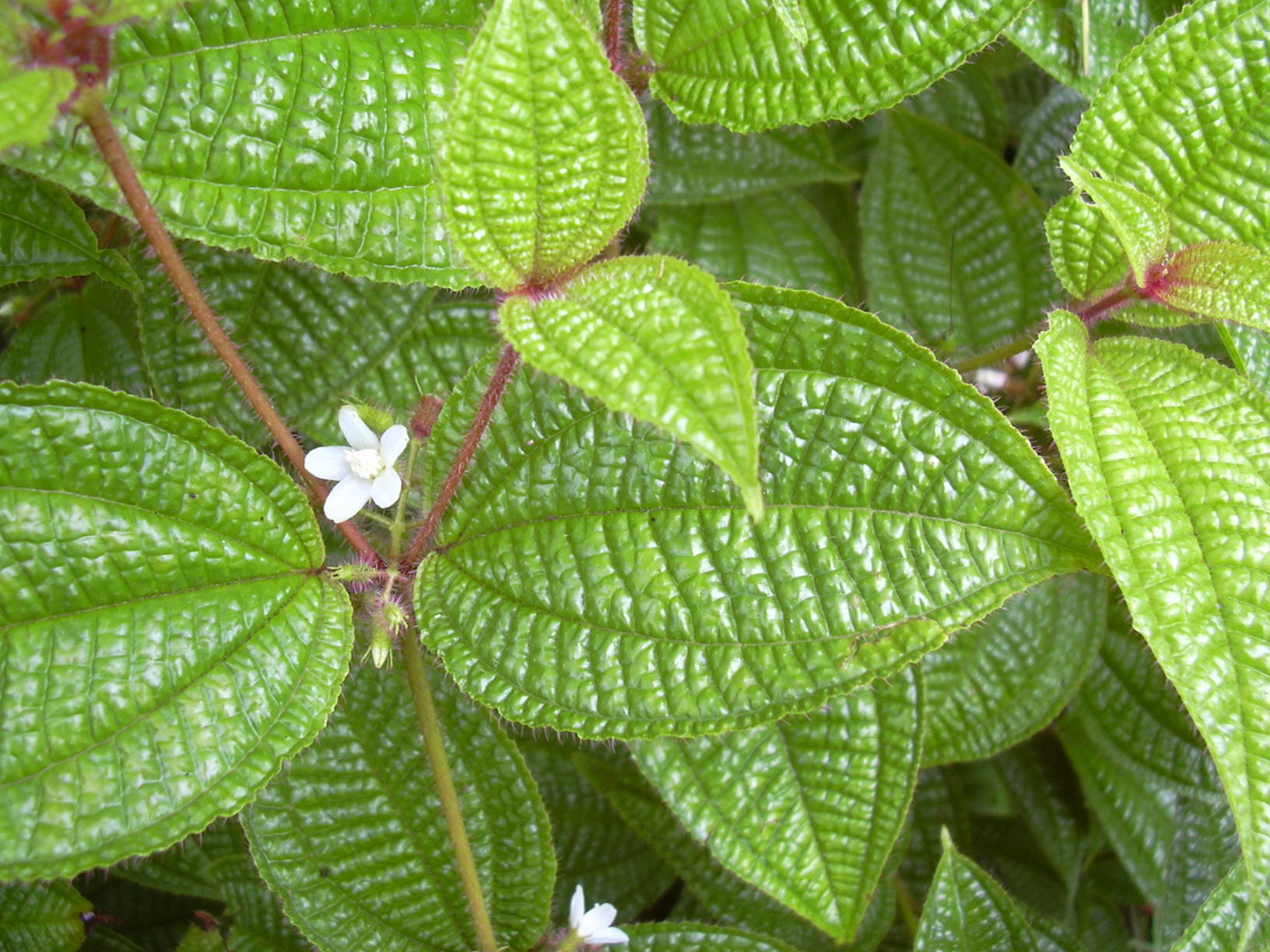

Scientific classification
- Kingdom: Plantae
- Clade: Tracheophytes
- Clade: Angiosperms
- Clade: Eudicots
- Clade: Rosids
- Order: Myrtales
- Family: Melastomataceae
- Genus: Miconia
- Species: M. crenata

Binomial name
- Miconia crenata (Vahl) Michelang.

Synonyms
- 21 synonyms: Melastoma crenatum Vahl; Clidemia benthamiana Miq.; Clidemia cognata Steud. ex Naudin; Clidemia crenata DC.; Clidemia elegans (Aubl.) D.Don; Clidemia hirta (L.) D.Don; Clidemia hirta var. chrysantha Cogn.; Clidemia hirta var. tiliifolia (DC.) J.F.Macbr.; Clidemia pauciflora DC.; Clidemia tiliifolia DC.; Dancera hirta (L.) Raf.; Leandra fimbriata Raddi; Maieta hirta (L.) Baill.; Melastoma elegans Aubl.; Melastoma hirtum L.; Melastoma pauciflorum Desr.; Staphidium anceps Naudin; Staphidium benthamianum Naudin; Staphidium chrysanthum Naudin; Staphidium elegans (Aubl.) Naudin; Staphidium hostmannii Naudin; Staphidium pauciflorum Naudin; Staphidium pauciflorum var. calcaratum Naudin; Staphidium pauciflorum var. stellulatum Naudin; Staphidium tiliifolium (DC.) Naudin

= Miconia crenata =

Species of flowering plant

Miconia crenata (syn. Clidemia hirta), commonly called Koster's curse, is a species of plant in the family Melastomataceae. It is a perennial shrub native to Central and South America, including the Caribbean, and it has been introduced to tropical parts of the Indian Ocean, Asia, Australia, and the Pacific Ocean. It is regarded as an invasive species in many of these regions.

== Description ==
Miconia crenata is a densely branching perennial shrub normally growing 0.5–3 m tall, but sometimes growing 5 m tall, depending on habitat.

The branchlets are covered in large, stiff, brown or reddish-colored hair. The simple leaves are oppositely arranged, oval-shaped in outline with a broad base, pointed tips, and almost entire to crenate or finely toothed margins. The leaves are also sparsely covered in hairs above, while more densely hairy beneath; and also have five distinct veins that run in an almost parallel fashion from the leaf bases to their tips.

The flowers are arranged in small clusters at the tips of the branches. Each flower has five white, or occasionally pale pinkish, petals and five distinctive stamens that have a claw-like appearance. The base of the flower is swollen into a cup-shaped structure which is moderately to sparsely covered with a mixture of bristly and sticky hairs.

The small, rounded fruit are berries and are either dark blue, purplish or blackish in color. Each of these berries contains over 100 light brown colored seeds.

== Distribution and habitat ==
Native from tropical areas in the Americas (Mexico to Paraguay as well as the Caribbean region). This species grows in dry to wet tropical climates up to 1200 m of elevation.

== Vernacular names ==
"Koster's curse" is a commonly used name in places where the plant grows as a noxious weed, such as Hawaii. It was introduced to Fiji in the late 1800s, likely by a coffee planter named William Parr who shared his seeds with others across the region; however the introduction was apparently misattributed by locals to a neighboring sugar planter named Köster. Other common names reported for this species are soapbush and clidemia.

== As an invasive species ==
This species is native to much of tropical America, but is an invasive species in Southern Asia, East Africa, and some oceanic islands (like Hawaii and Australia) with warmer climates. It is a potential weed of wetter pastures, open grasslands, plantations, roadsides, wetter open woodlands, riparian zones (banks of watercourses), forest margins and rainforests. M. crenata can form dense thickets that smother plantations, pastures and native vegetation. Disturbance is a key element in the establishment and invasion of the plant. Wildfires, landslides, windstorms and other forms of soil disturbance (such as pig rooting) accelerate the dominance of this weed (Smith Undated; Peters 2001).

In its native environment plants are confined to open areas and only become dominant about twelve months after disturbance, such as in slash-and-burn agricultural areas (Burkhart Pers. Comm, in Smith Undated). All new range extensions in Hawaii begin along the open edges of trails or other disturbed areas. In Hawaii, M. crenata is replacing the endemic species that formerly dominated the forests and threatens them with extinction. Elsewhere, it is regarded as one of the most problematic invasive species in the Comoros Archipelago, on La Réunion, in the Seychelles and on Mauritius. In Sri Lanka it is quite invasive in wet zone and upcountry forests, especially invading gaps in the forest, preventing other native species from emerging.

=== Control strategies/biological control ===
In order to keep the weed out of an area the primary management objective should be to minimize and prevent disturbance (Smith Undated). Manually pulling plants out of the ground supplemented by herbicide application is an effective but temporary control method. The thrips species Liothrips urichi from Trinidad is being used to biologically control M. crenata and is very effective in pastures but much less so in woodlands; it was first employed on Fiji in 1930 (Simmonds, 1933). Controlling feral pig populations (Sus scrofa) has been widely suggested as an effective means to reduce the spread of M. crenata, as ground disturbance by these exotic mammals is strongly linked to the successful establishment of M. crenata, as well as a number of other invasive plants such as Morella faya.

Although sheep have been shown to control most weeds in plantations, they will not eat M. crenata (Francis, 2004). According to Mune and Parham (1967), no effective chemical control for M. crenata exists. However, Teoh et al. (1982) report that M. crenata may be killed by applications of triclopyr. Norman and Trujillo (1995) have found that a mycoherbicide containing Colletotrichum gloeosporioides f.sp. clidemiae as the active ingredient was effective against M. crenata.

=== Policy and law ===
It is not listed as a noxious weed by the state or governments in Kenya, Tanzania and Uganda.

=== Occurrence in Australia ===
An infestation of M. crenata was found in Julatten (near Mount Molloy, Queensland) in 2001. This outbreak threatens to spread into the Mount Lewis National Park and Mowbray National Park. Community-based efforts to control the plant in Julatten are coordinated by the Mitchell River watershed management group.

In New South Wales Australia, there is a hotline number for citizens to call and report to the Department of Primary Industries any noticed occurrences of the plant.

== Gallery ==
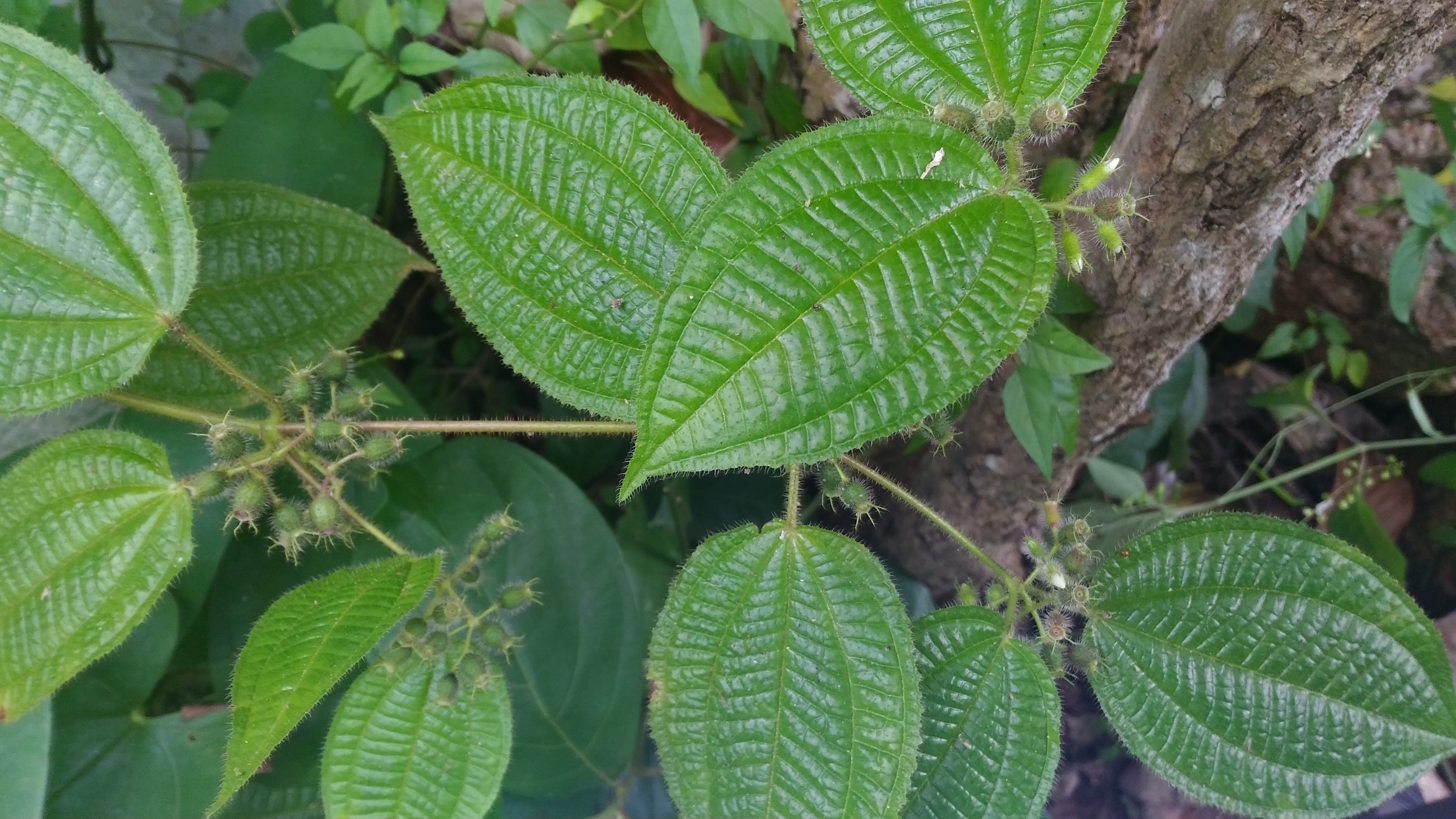
Clidemia hirta plant

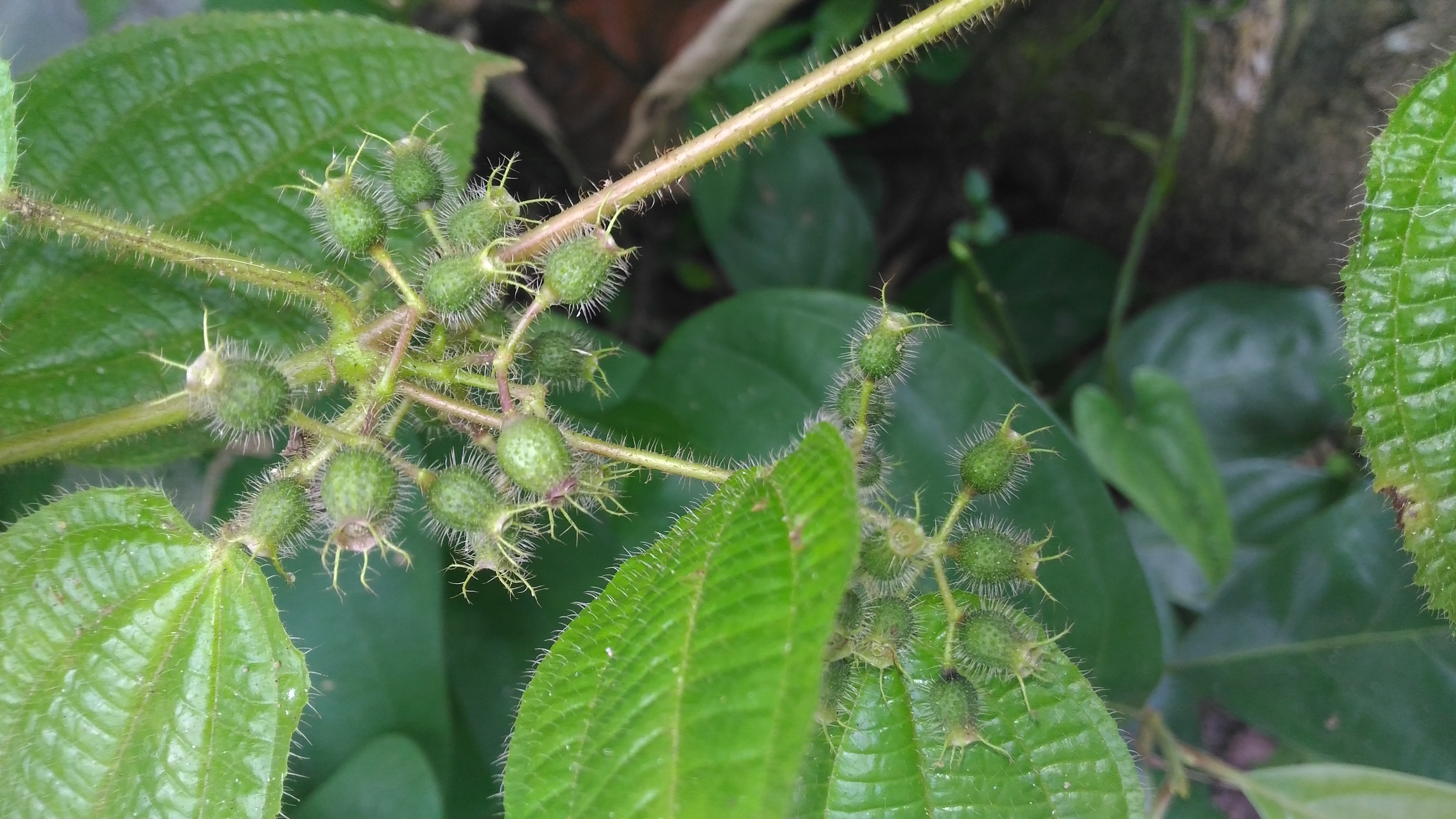
Clidemia hirta fruits

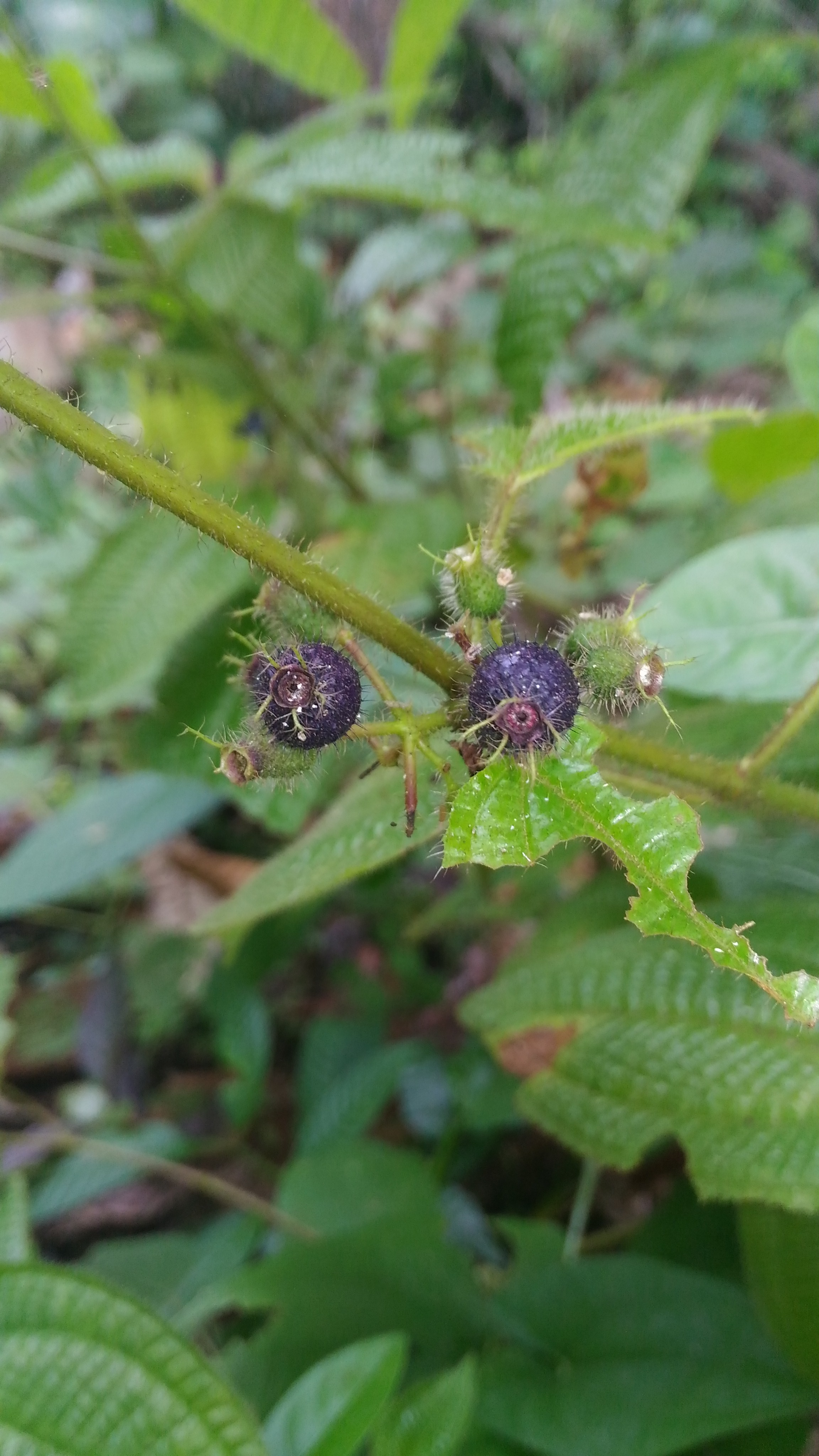
Clidemia hirta ripened fruits

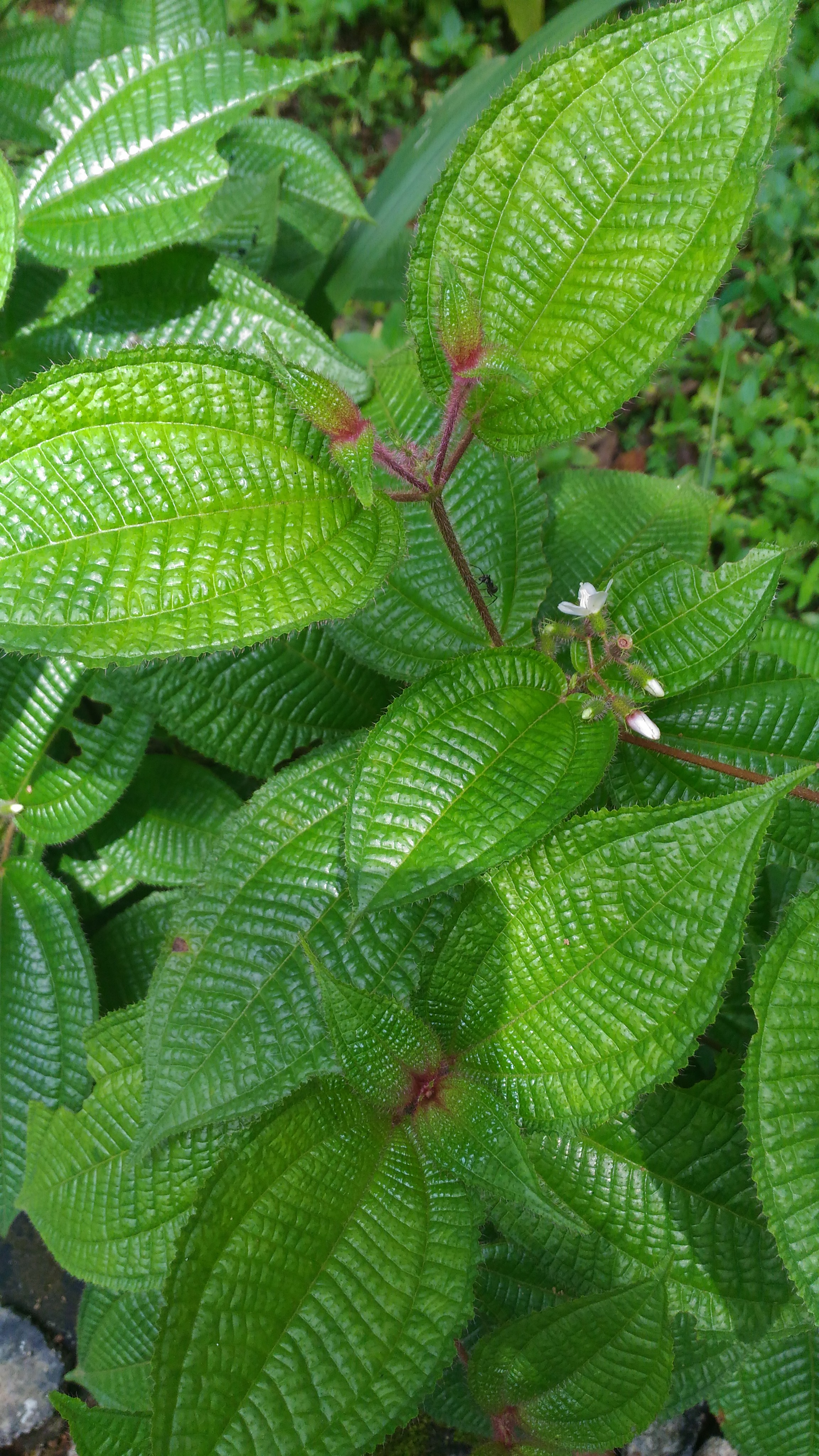
Clidemia hirta

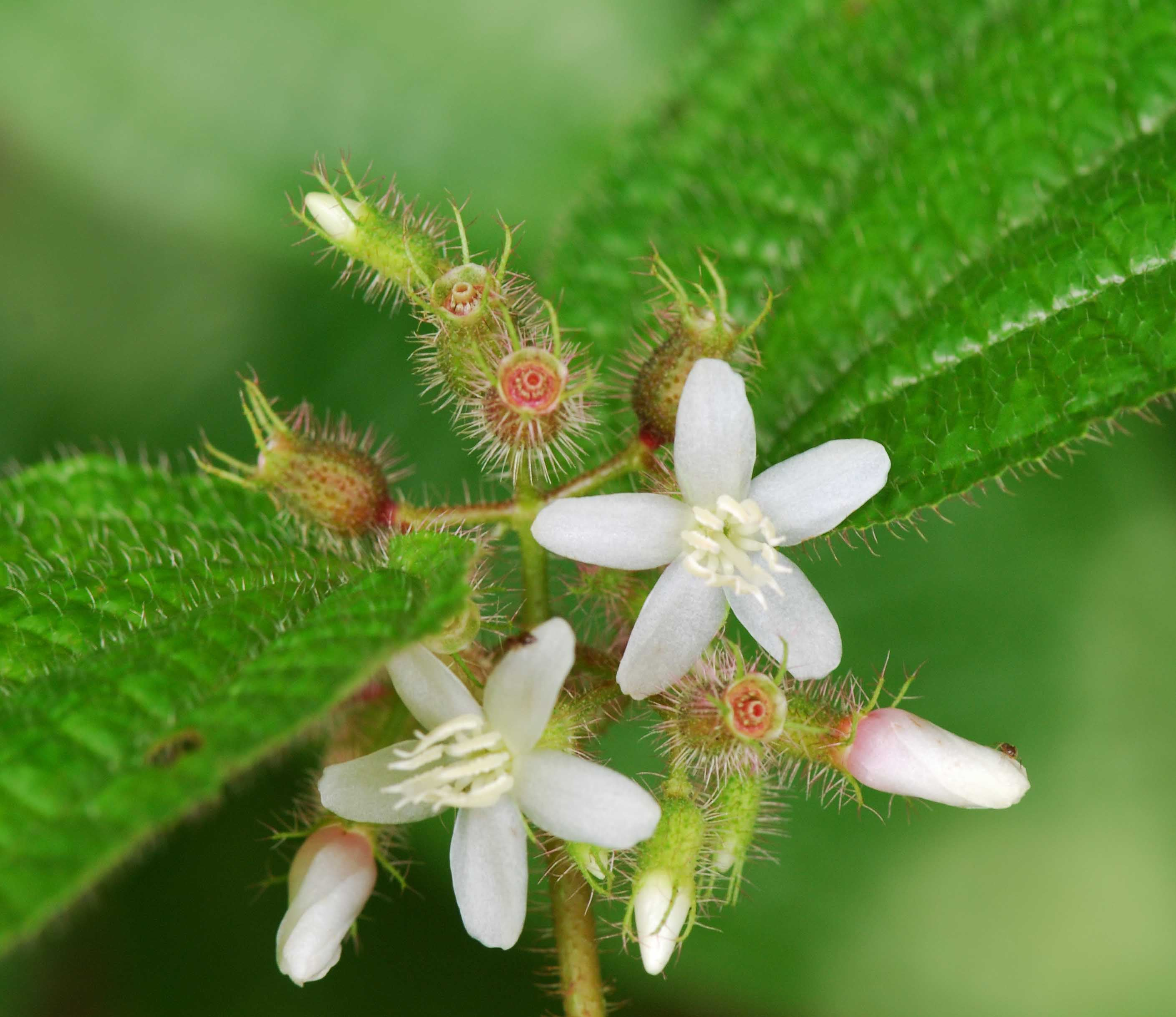
Clidemia hirta leaves, flowers and fruits

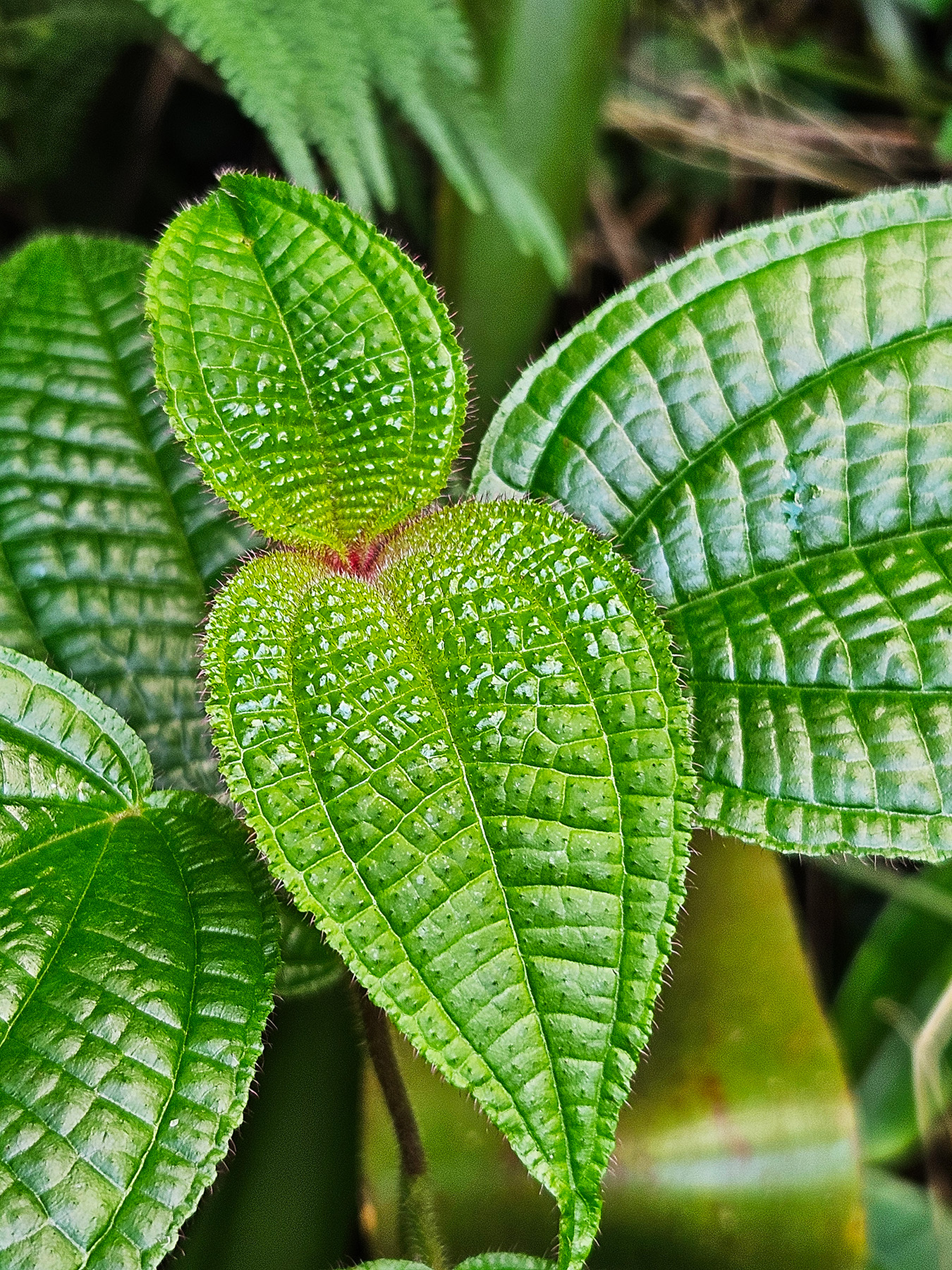
Miconia crenata (Vahl) Michelang. (Maui)
