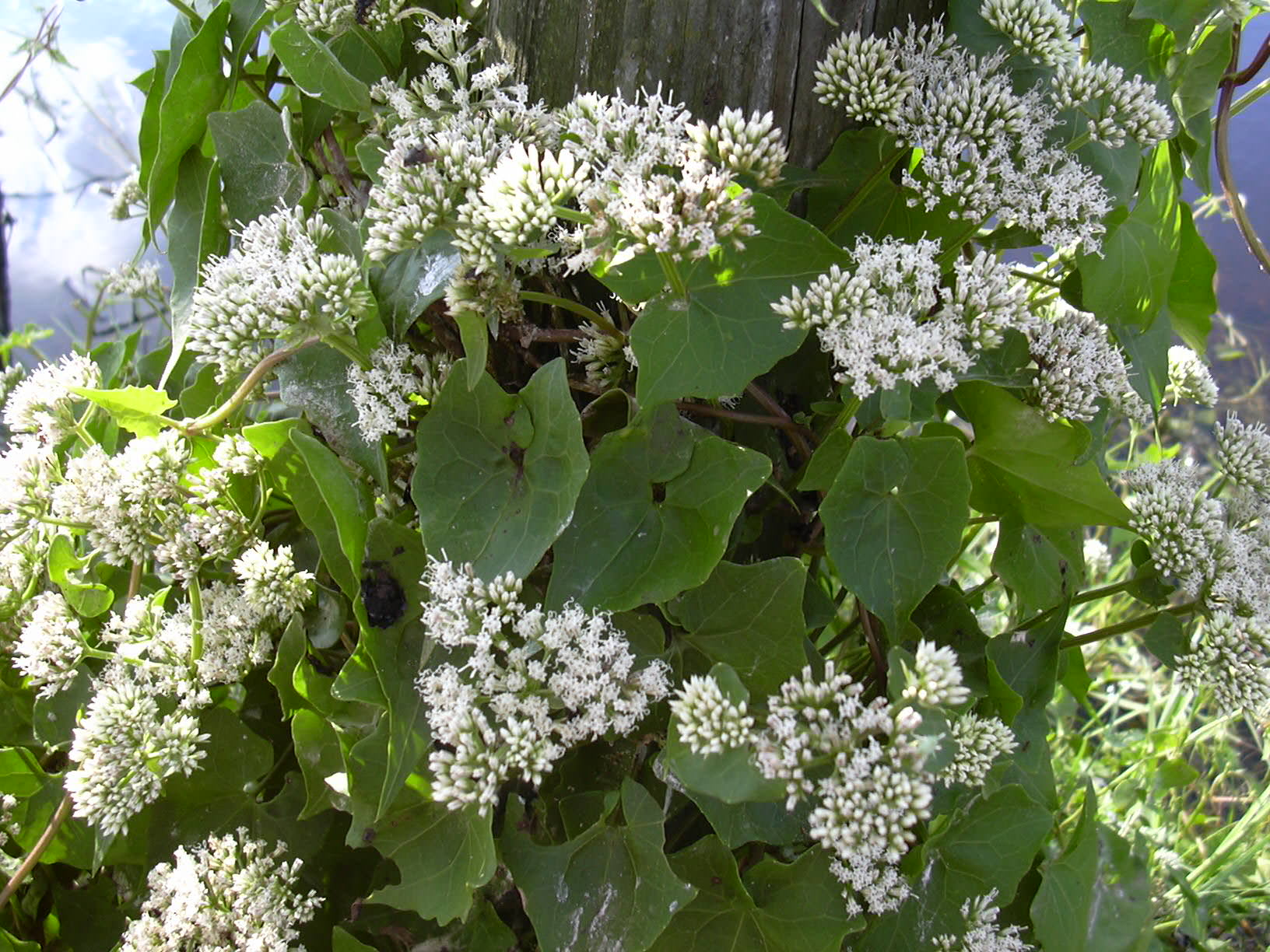

Conservation status
- Secure (NatureServe)

Scientific classification
- Kingdom: Plantae
- Clade: Tracheophytes
- Clade: Angiosperms
- Clade: Eudicots
- Clade: Asterids
- Order: Asterales
- Family: Asteraceae
- Genus: Mikania
- Species: M. scandens

Binomial name
- Mikania scandens (L.) Willd.

Synonyms
- Eupatorium scandens; Mikania angulosa; Mikania batatifolia; Willoughbya heterophylla

= Mikania scandens =

Species of flowering plant

Mikania scandens is a species of flowering plant in the family Asteraceae. Its common names include climbing hempvine, climbing hempweed, and louse-plaster. It is native to the eastern and central United States, with its distribution extending into Tamaulipas, Mexico. Reports of its presence in Ontario, Canada are erroneous. It is an introduced and invasive species on many Pacific Islands and in parts of southern Asia.

== Description ==
This species is a perennial herb which grows as a branching vine. The leaves are oppositely arranged at swollen nodes on the stem. They have triangular or heart-shaped, sometimes toothed blades up to 15 centimeters long by 11 wide. The flower heads are clustered in panicles. The flower head is about half a centimeter long and is enclosed in narrow, sometimes purple-tinged phyllaries. The flowers are pinkish, purplish, or white. The fruit is a dark-colored, resinous achene about half a centimeter long, including its pappus of white or purplish bristles.

== Biology ==
The pappus-tipped seeds are dispersed on the wind or on clothing or fur. The plant also reproduces vegetatively by rooting from the nodes on sections of stem. The climbing herbage can become weedy and dense, sometimes covering other vegetation. It also has allelopathic effects on other plants.

Its native habitat includes wooded areas and swamps.

This is a host plant for the larvae of the Little Metalmark (Calephelis virginiensis), and the adult consumes the nectar.

== Uses ==
This plant is cultivated as a cover crop and a livestock fodder. It is also grown as an ornamental plant and it is used in butterfly gardens.

It is used in traditional medicine systems of the Indian subcontinent as a treatment for gastric ulcers, wounds, and insect bites and stings.
