= Mikania cuencana =

Conservation status
- Data Deficient (IUCN 3.1)

Scientific classification
- Kingdom: Plantae
- Clade: Tracheophytes
- Clade: Angiosperms
- Clade: Eudicots
- Clade: Asterids
- Order: Asterales
- Family: Asteraceae
- Genus: Mikania
- Species: M. cuencana

Binomial name
- Mikania cuencana Hieron.

Species of flowering plant

Mikania cuencana is a species of flowering plant in the family Asteraceae. It is found only in Ecuador. Its natural habitat is subtropical or tropical moist montane forests. It has two isolated surviving subpopulations in Azuay and Pichincha, neither of which are housed in any Ecuadorian museums. These populations are threatened by habitat loss, and there are no other known threats to the species. During World War II, another subspecies was apparently lost in the destruction of the herbarium of the Botanical Museum Berlin-Dahlem in Berlin, Germany.
