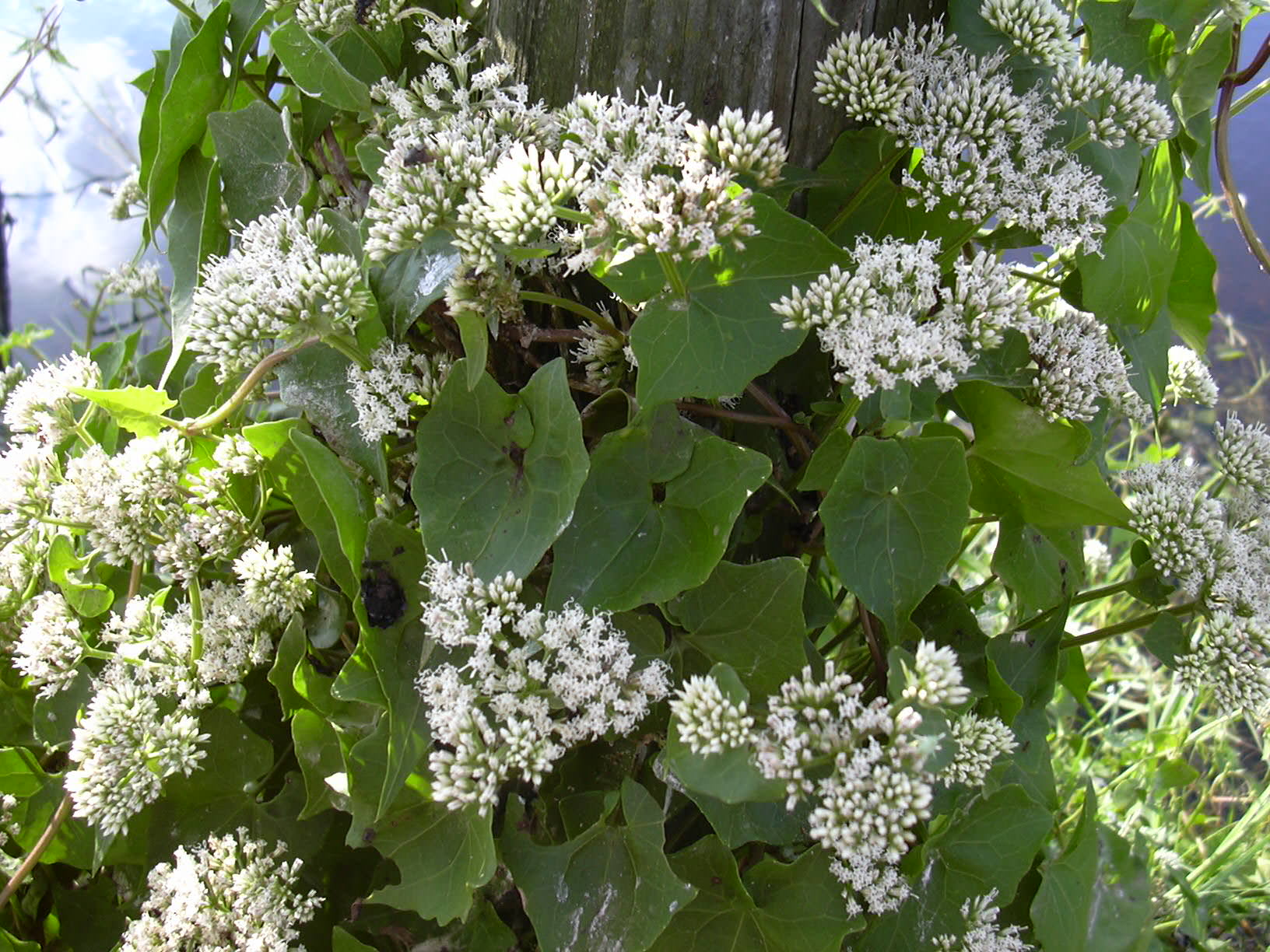
- Mikania scandens

Scientific classification
- Kingdom: Plantae
- Clade: Embryophytes
- Clade: Tracheophytes
- Clade: Angiosperms
- Clade: Eudicots
- Clade: Asterids
- Order: Asterales
- Family: Asteraceae
- Subfamily: Asteroideae
- Tribe: Eupatorieae
- Genus: Mikania; Willd. 1803, conserved name not F.W.Schmidt 1795 (Asteraceae) nor Neck. 1790 (Moraceae)

Diversity
- c. 450 species

Synonyms
- Morrenia Kunze; Kanimia Gardner; Corynanthelium Kunze; Wikstroemia Spreng.; Carelia Juss. ex Cav.; Catophyllum Pohl ex Baker; Willoughbya Neck. ex Kuntze; Willugbaeya Neck.

= Mikania =

Genus of flowering plants

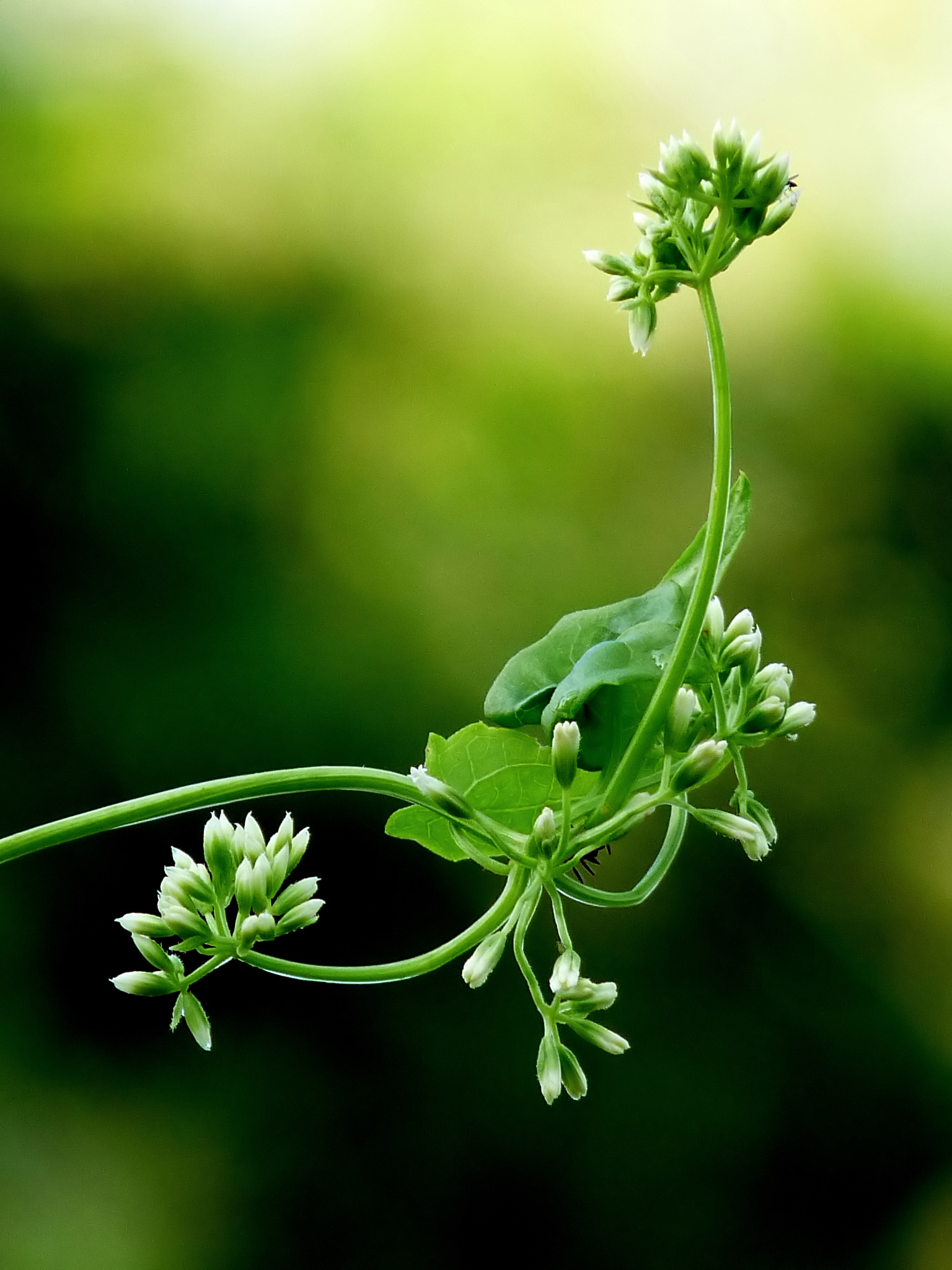
Mikania micrantha

Mikania is a genus of about 450 species of plants in the tribe Eupatorieae within the family Asteraceae.

The name honors the Czech botanist Johann Christian Mikan, 1743–1814. Members of the genus are stem twiners and lianas and are common in the neotropical flora. Mikania originates from South America. A few species, such as Mikania scandens, are found in temperate areas of North and South America, and nine species are known from the Old World tropics. As with other plants in the tribe Eupatorieae, the flowers have disc florets and no ray florets.

The species Mikania laevigata and Mikania glomerata, also known as guaco, are popular in herbal medicine.

Mikania micrantha is a widespread weed in the tropics. It grows very quickly (as fast as 80 mm in 24 hours for a young plant) and covers other plants. People have looked into controlling it with herbicides, parasitic plants, fungi and insects.

== Selected species ==
- Mikania andrei (Ecuador)
- Mikania chimborazensis (Ecuador)
- Mikania cordata Old World Tropics
- Mikania cuencana (Ecuador)
- Mikania harlingii (Ecuador)
- Mikania iodotricha (Ecuador)
- Mikania iserniana (Ecuador)
- Mikania micrantha (widespread weed in many tropical areas including southern Florida)
- Mikania millei (Ecuador)
- Mikania natalensis (Africa)
- Mikania oreophila (Brazil)
- Mikania pulverulenta (Ecuador)
- Mikania scandens (Mexico, Bahamas, and eastern United States as far north as Maine + Michigan)
- Mikania seemannii (Ecuador)
- Mikania stereolepis (Ecuador)
- Mikania tafallana (Ecuador)
