= Benjamin Lincoln Robinson =

U.S. botanist (1864–1935)

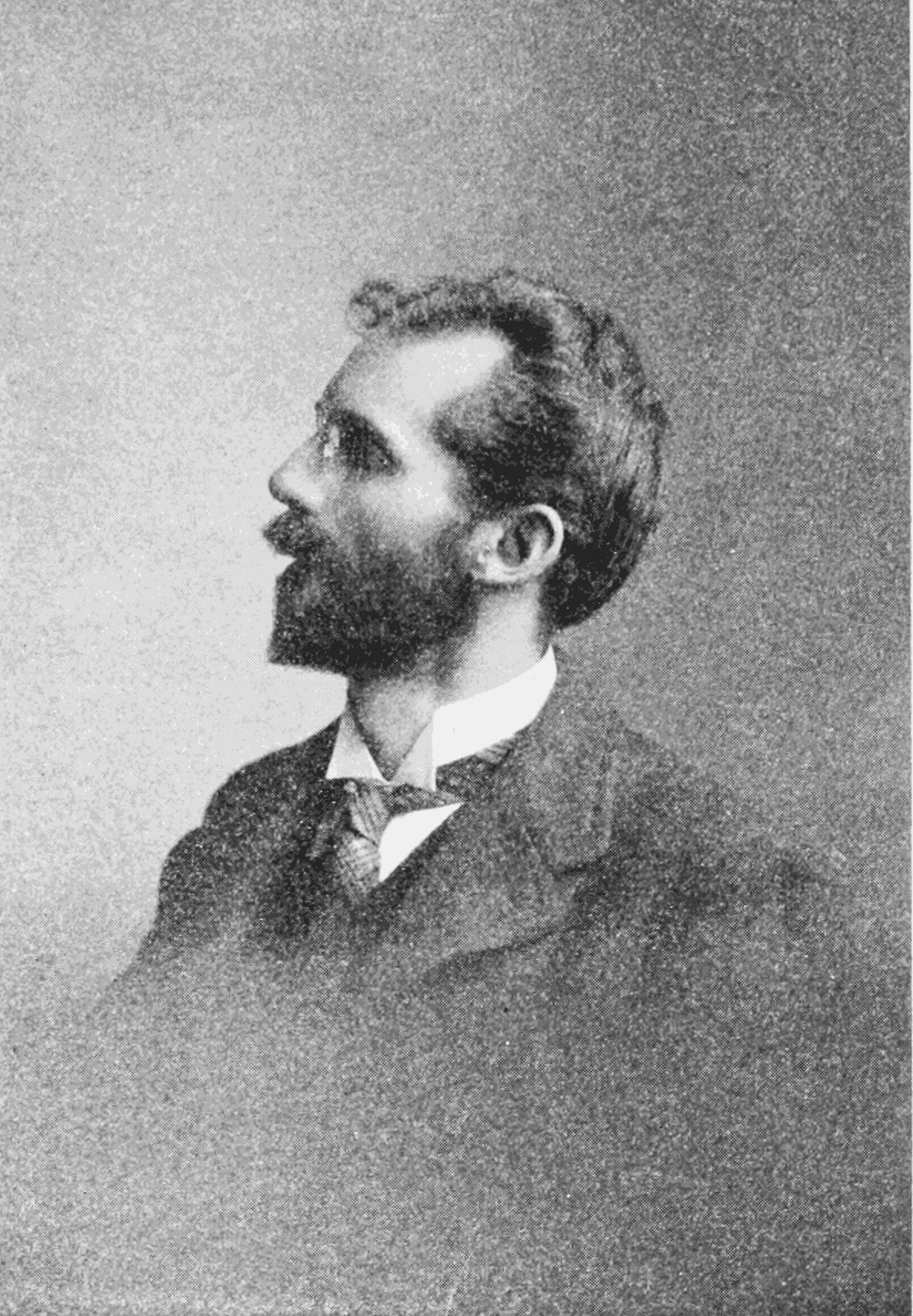
- Born: November 8, 1864; Bloomington, Illinois
- Died: July 27, 1935 (aged 70); Jaffrey, New Hampshire
- Citizenship: American
- Education: Harvard University University of Strasbourg
- Scientific career
- Fields: Botany
- Workplaces: Gray Herbarium
- Doctoral advisor: Hermann zu Solms-Laubach
- Author abbrev. (botany): B.L.Rob.

Benjamin Lincoln Robinson (November 8, 1864 – July 27, 1935) was an American botanist. He served as Gray Herbarium curator and professor of systematic botany at Harvard University for most of his career. He edited the journal Rhodora for 30 years.

== Biography ==
Robinson was born on November 8, 1864, in Bloomington, Illinois. In 1887, he received an A.B. from Harvard College. He married Margaret Louise Casson on June 29, 1887, and couple traveled to Europe. He studied plant anatomy with Hermann zu Solms-Laubach and completed his Dr.phil. at the University of Strasbourg in 1889. He returned to the United States in the fall of 1890. He spent most of his career as Gray Herbarium curator. He died at his summer home in Jaffrey, New Hampshire, on July 27, 1935.

== Career ==
In 1891, Robinson became an assistant to Sereno Watson, the curator of the Gray Herbarium at Harvard University. On Watson's death in 1892, Robinson was appointed to the curator position. In 1899, Robinson became the first Asa Gray Professor of Systematic Botany at Harvard. He served as the editor of the New England Botanical Club's journal Rhodora from 1899 to 1928. While at the Gray Herbarium, he began a long association with fellow botanist Jesse More Greenman.

== Awards ==
- 1929—Centennial Gold medal of the Massachusetts Horticultural Society

== Family ==
Benjamin Lincoln Robinson was a brother of James Harvey Robinson (1868–1936), a historian, scholar, and educator.
