= Flora of Samoa =

Plant species of Samoa

- Clinostigma warburgii, an endemic palm species

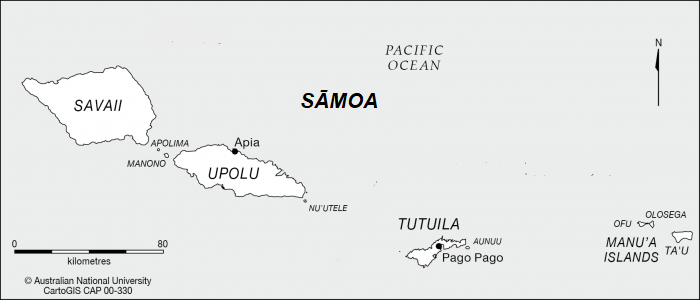

Ecology
- Realm: Oceania
- Biome: Tropical moist forests

The flora of Samoa comprises a range of vascular and non-vascular plants (moss and liverworts) found in the Samoan Islands. The flora comprises 833 native and naturalised flowering plants, 482 bryophyte species (including 248 species of moss and 234 liverwort species), and 225 species of ferns and fern allies. The islands that support this flora are of volcanic origin, with peaks rising to 1,858 m (6,096 ft). The volcanic landforms of the islands, combined with a tropical climate and high rainfall create a diverse range of habitats from mangrove forests along coastlines to lowland rainforests and cloud forests at higher elevations. The islands lie within the Polynesia-Micronesia biodiversity hotspot, an area with high levels of endemism. Most Samoan plants have origins in Southeast Asia and New Guinea, but a small number of species may have originated from the Americas. There are 540 native flowering plants and around one third of these are endemic. The largest family within the flowering plants of Samoa are orchids, with 101 native species, representing the highest diversity of orchid flora among all Polynesian islands.

Around 80% of the original lowland forest has been lost to logging and agriculture, while invasive species have also been a threat to plant habitats. Conservation efforts have focused on ecosystem preservation and sustainable development. In one example, 12,000 ha (30,000 acres) of lowland rainforest at Falealupo on the island of Savaiʻi has been protected with a covenant by the traditional village owners. Specific conservation measures have been taken to preserve rare and endangered plants, with the establishment of a conservation garden at the Vailima Botanical Gardens on the island of Upolu. Many of Samoa's plants are important for practical and cultural purposes and for traditional medicine.

== Context ==
=== Geography ===
The Samoan Islands are in the central Pacific Ocean and are volcanic in origin. The largest islands in the group are Savaiʻi and Upolu. The islands are politically divided between Samoa, an independent country; and American Samoa, an unincorporated territory of the United States.

The islands are located south of the equator, and have a humid tropical climate. Annual rainfall varies from 2,540 mm (100 in) at the coastline to 7,620 mm (300 in) inland. The highest point on the islands is Mount Silisili on the island of Savaiʻi, at an elevation of 1,858 m (6,096 ft).

Samoa is highly forested, with trees covering 60.4% of the country, which is equivalent to roughly 171,000 hectares. The region experienced significant ecological growth between 1990 and 2000, expanding its forest cover by an average of 4,100 hectares, or 3.15%, each year. This rapid reforestation halted between 2000 and 2005. In total, between 1990 and 2005, Samoa expanded its forest cover by 31.5%, which is about 41,000 hectares, and achieved a net gain of 23.9% in its combined forest and woodland habitats.

=== Origins ===
Most Samoan plants have their origins in Southeast Asia and New Guinea. However, there are a few species which may have originated from the Americas, including Vaccinium whitmeei, a member of the Ericaceae family found on lava flows on Savaiʻi. The species Abutilon whistleri, Gyrocarpus americanus and Rhizophora mangle may also have American origins. Ancestors have been arriving for more than two million years, spreading their seeds through the wind, via birds and bats, or by floating on seawater. Although ocean currents are highly effective in dispersing seeds, this only works for coastal species like the coconut. To survive the long drift, these plants must produce strong and hard floating seeds or fruits.

=== Scientific study ===
The United States Exploring Expedition in 1839 marked the first major botanical study in Samoa. While the team gathered extensive plant collections, they did not record any local Samoan names. Over the next fifty years, three amateur European botanists—Swiss physician Eduard Graeffe and English missionaries Thomas Powell and Samuel J. Whitmee—built upon this work with their own large collections. Among them, only Powell documented the Samoan names for the plants. His comprehensive 1868 publication On Various Samoan Plants and Their Vernacular Names remains an important resource today, valued for its historical significance and Powell's abilities as a Samoan-speaking naturalist. Following this period, Samoan botany shifted into a second phase led by professional European scientists, beginning with F. Reinecke's 1897 publication Die Flora der Samoa-Inseln about local flora.

== Plant diversity ==
Samoa is within the Polynesia-Micronesia biodiversity hotspot, a region in the oceania biogeographic realm with high levels of endemism. The flora of Samoa includes 833 native and naturalised flowering plants, and 225 ferns and allies. This is one-third the size of Fiji's flora, though the two regions are close enough to have similar floras. There is only one species of gymnosperm native to Samoa. There are high levels of biodiversity for mosses and liverworts across all the islands.

=== Flowering plants ===
There are 540 native flowering plants, and 250 more naturalised plants in the Samoan Islands. Two thirds of them are dicotyledons. The largest family of flowering plants is Orchidaceae (orchids), which includes 101 native species. This represents the highest diversity of orchid flora among all Polynesian islands. Species include large purple orchid, christmas orchid, shield orchid, Samoan bulbophyllum, and Mohl's dendrobium. (Note: See also Cribb & Whistler's Orchids of Samoa.) The second largest family is Rubiaceae (the madder or coffee family), comprising 47 native and five naturalised species. Species include, Morinda citrifolia, Mussaenda raiateensis, Psychotria insularum, and Tarenna sambucina. The third biggest family is Urticaceae with 25 species. They include Elatostema species, Laportea interrupta, Pipturus argenteus, and Pipturus polynesicus. The largest genera are Cyrtandra (20 species), Psychotria (19 species), and then Syzygium (16 species).

Orchids

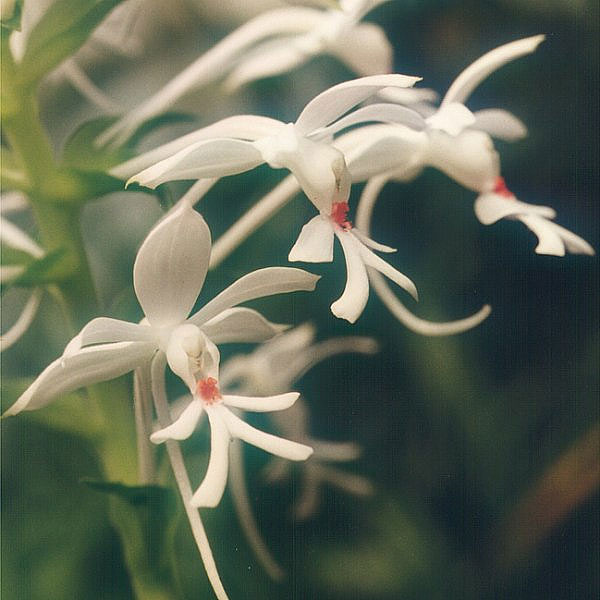
Christmas orchid

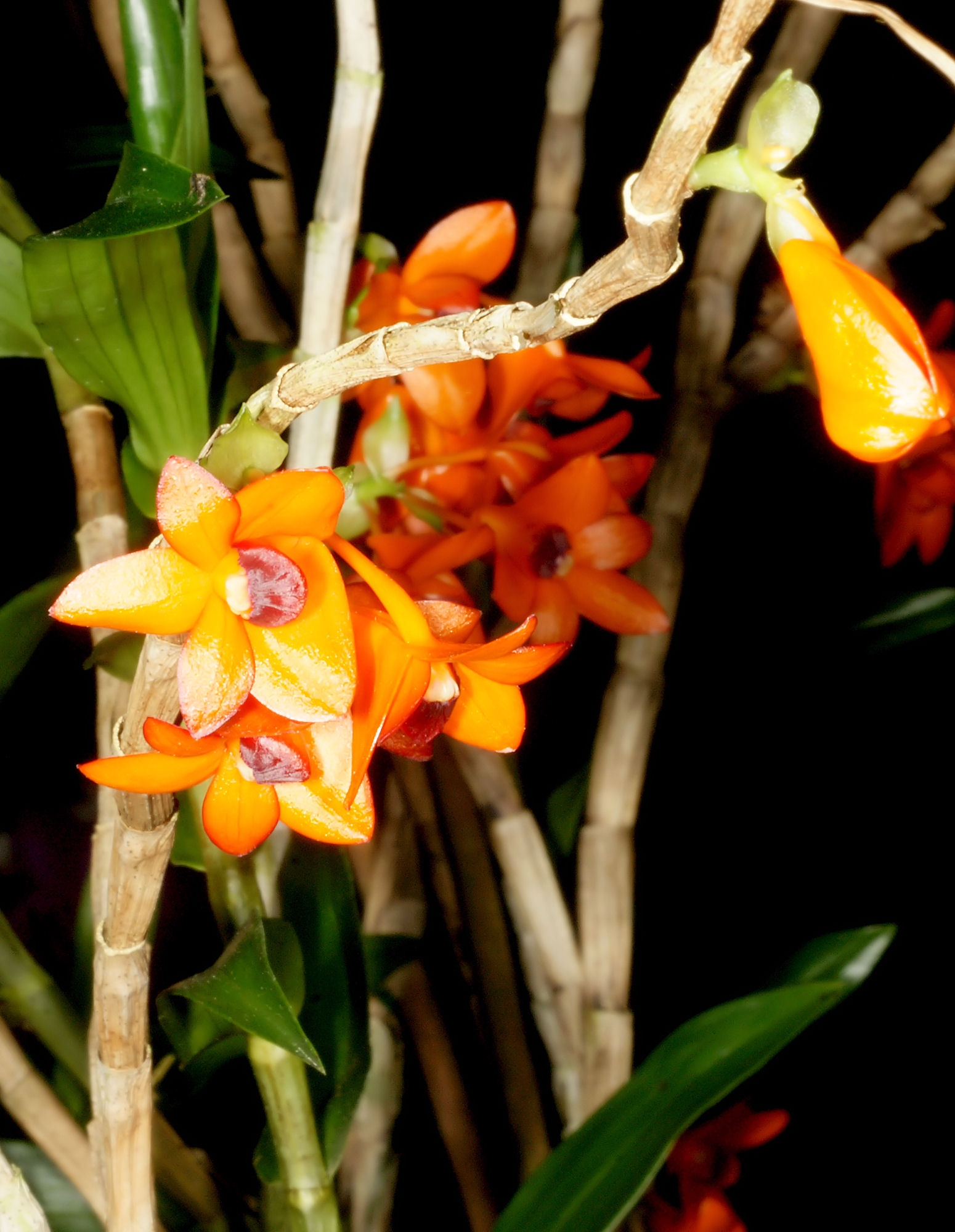
Mohl's dendrobium

Shield orchid

One third of the flowering plant species are endemic, meaning they are found nowhere else in the world. High rates of endemism are mostly on the montane and cloud forests, while rates on littoral habitats are zero percent. Over 108 plant species are rare in Samoa. Apart from rare endemic plants, other rare species include Acacia simplex, Amorphophallus paeoniifolius (elephant foot yam), Atuna racemosa (tabon-tabon), Benincasa hispida (wax gourd), Ceratophyllum demersum (coontail), Cucumis melo (melon), Dodonaea viscosa (hopbush), Gardenia taitensis (Tahitian gardenia), Gossypium hirsutum (upland cotton), Ipomoea indica (blue morning glory), and Sophora tomentosa (necklace pod). Centipeda minima has only been collected in Samoa five times, and three of these were documented over 100 years ago. Some endemic species such as the Corybas betchei, Dendrobium scirpoides, Cyrtandra campanulata, and Cyrtandra funkii are possibly extinct; the only collection was made over a century ago.

Endemic plants of Samoa

Schefflera samoensis, Mount Matavanu, Savaiʻi

Vaccinium whitmeei in the Ericaceae family found only in Savaiʻi

Coprosma strigulosa

Platylepis heteromorpha
Flowers of Heliconia laufao

Polyscias pleiosperma

Ixora amplifolia, in the Rubiaceae family

Samoa's grasses include the coastal beach dropseed (Sporobolus virginicus), basket grass (Oplismenus hirtellus), wild sugarcane (Saccharum maximum), Indian goosegrass (Eleusine indica), lemongrass (Cymbopogon citratus), and the burr grass Cenchrus calyculatus. Its sedges include the fragrant flatsedge (Cyperus odoratus), Javanese flatsedge (Cyperus javanicus), Chinese water chestnut (Eleocharis dulcis), and the endemic Samoan sedges Carex samoensis and Carex graeffeana.

=== Gymnosperms ===
The only gymnosperm native to Samoa is a cycad species, Cycas seemannii. It is native to regions from Queensland, Australia to the southwest Pacific.

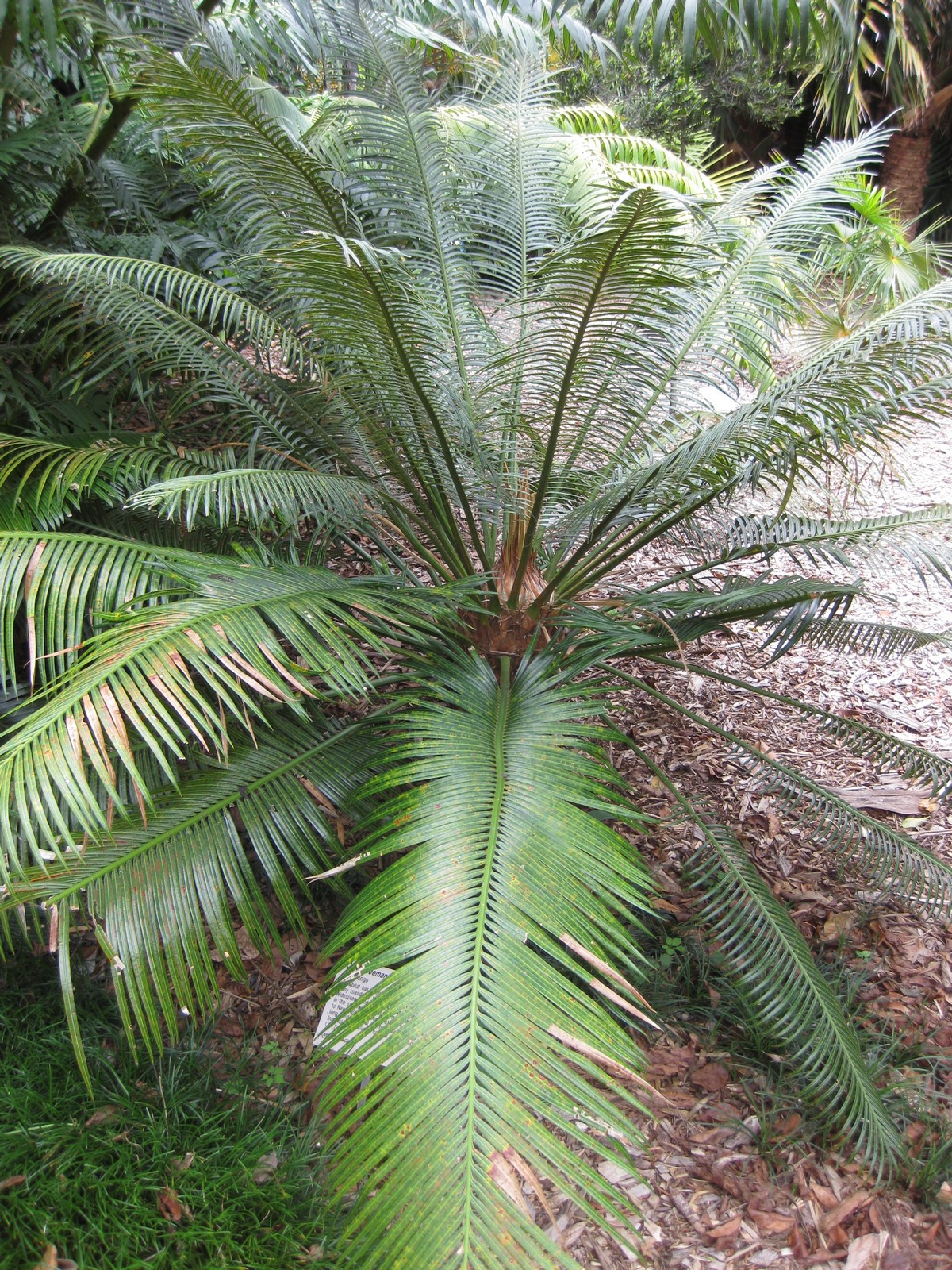
Cycas seemannii, Samoa's only native gymnosperm

=== Ferns and allies ===
The islands have over 225 species of ferns, more than New Zealand, a country that is 85 times larger. Despite this, endemism is quite low. According to the regional database on Plant Reference, the native flora of the islands includes a diverse selection of pteridophytes thriving across local ecosystems. This botanical collection shows several taxa. Species include the black maidenhair fern Adiantum capillus-veneris, the bird's nest fern Asplenium australasicum, the basket fern Drynaria rigidula, the pouched coral fern Gleichenia dicarpa, the water fern Histiopteris incisa, and the Kimberley queen fern Nephrolepis obliterata.

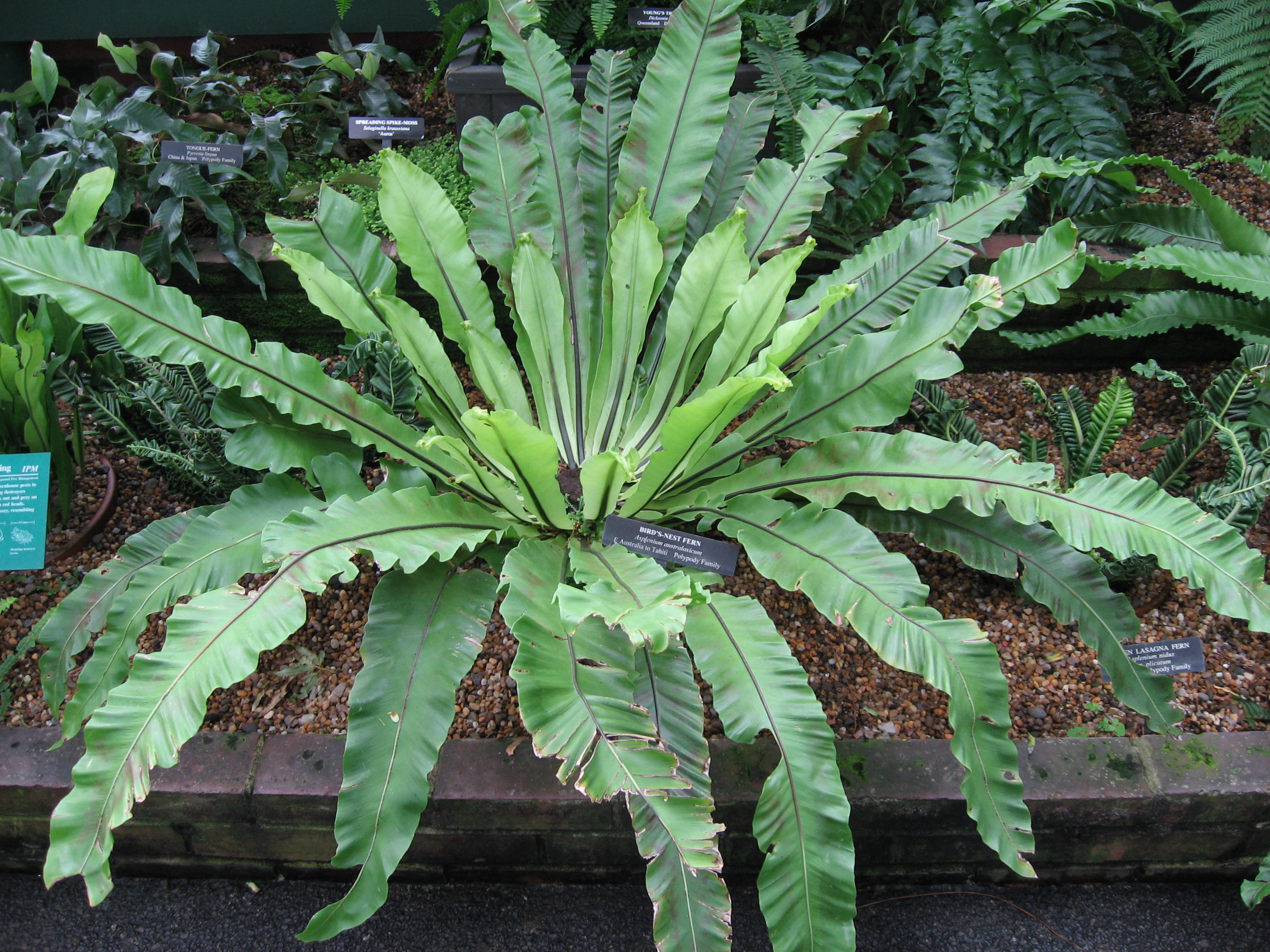
Asplenium australasicum, the bird's nest fern

=== Mosses and liverworts ===
The Samoan Islands possess a rich bryoflora. In 1990, researchers reported a combined regional total of 248 moss species and 234 hepatic (liverwort) species, and estimated that the flora was 80% documented. The Independent State of Samoa has extensive high-elevation habitats for moss and liverwort; the island of Savaiʻi hosts 106 moss species, while Upolu supports 183 moss and 110 hepatic species. The smaller territory of American Samoa has fewer habitats but records notable diversity, with its principal island, Tutuila, hosting 114 moss and 37 liverwort species. The territory's Manuʻa Islands record 33 moss and 4 liverwort species, though this count remains incomplete as the high-altitude cloud forests of Mount Lata (over 910 m (3,000 ft)) support specialized genera like Spiridens, Floribundaria, and Acroporium that indicate significant potential for future botanical discoveries. Representatives in the Bryaceae moss family include Brachymenium melanothecium, Bryum bicolor, Brachymenium indicum, Bryum pachytheca, Bryum chrysoneuron, and Bryum ramosum.

The moss Ptychomnion aciculare

== Vegetation zones ==
The Samoan Islands have many different vegetation zones, mainly composed of lowland rainforest, montane rainforest, and cloud forests. There are also swamp forests, mangrove forests, littoral scrub, and volcanic scrub, and littoral forest, montane meadow, and two types of upland scrub.

=== Lowland rainforest ===
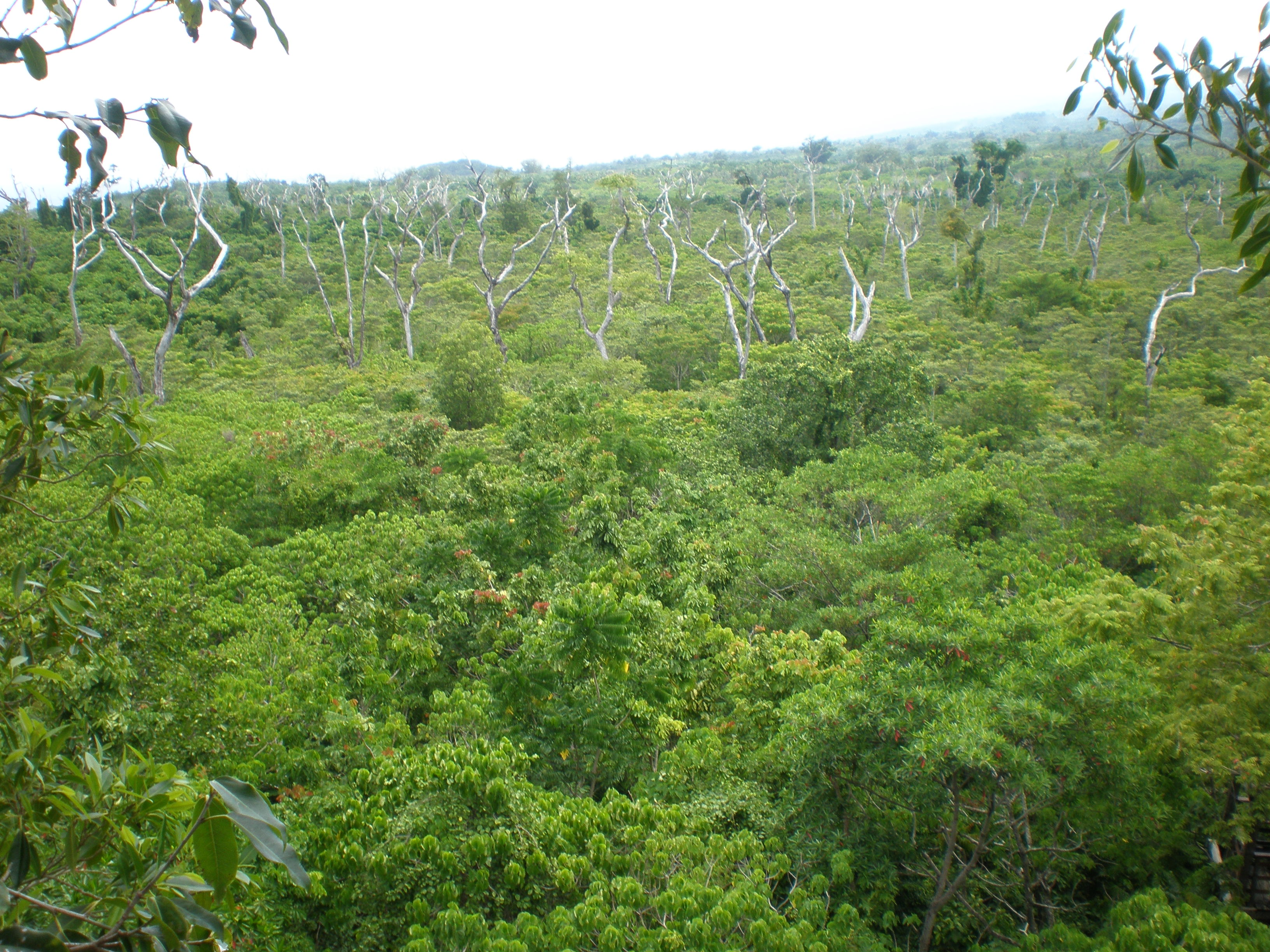
Falealupo Rainforest

Lowland rainforests represent the most complex and geographically extensive forest ecosystem in the islands. This ecosystem is divided into four distinct plant communities classified by their substrate composition, moisture levels, and specific species assemblages.

The Diospyros community consists of medium-statured canopy trees growing on well-drained soils, typically located just inland of littoral (coastal) forest zones. It is heavily dominated by Samoan ebonys, which grow alongside Syzygium clusiifolium and Syzygium dealatum. While banyan trees serves as a primary canopy component, littoral species like the devil's claws tree are also occasionally present. Intact examples of this forest community survive on Apolima Island and the Aleipata Islands off the eastern coast of ‘Upolu.

The Pometia community is characterised by its massive emergent canopy layer, this community stands as one of the tallest rainforest types in the archipelago. It is defined by its primary emergent Tava Tree, which grows in association with Miva Mahogany, Pacific Banyan, Myristica fatua, Neonauclea forsteri, and Planchonella torricellensis. This forest type represents a climax community growing on newly formed soils. While it originally covered extensive lowland areas of both Savai‘i and ‘Upolu up to elevations of 450 metres, the remaining areas are primarily restricted to the southern coasts of these two main islands.

The Syzygium community thrives on older, heavily weathered volcanic soils, typically occupying lowland ridges and steep interior slopes. The dominant canopy species is Syzygium inophylloides. Other major canopy contributors include Toi, Calophyllum neo-ebudicum, Canarium vitiense, perfume flower tree, Tahitian chestnut, Myristica hypargyraea, Planchonella garberi, and Syzygium samoense.

the Planchonella forest type is highly restricted in its contemporary distribution and represents a climax community that develops on moderately weathered volcanic soils. The canopy is dominated by Planchonella torricellensis, which grows alongside Calophyllum neo-ebudicum, Canarium vitiense, Miva Mahogany Myristica fatua, and Syzygium inophylloides. Historically, Planchonella forests formed the vast majority of the lowland vegetative cover across ‘Upolu, alongside substantial portions of Savai‘i.

Rainforests are natural barriers that help to reduce the impacts of heavy rainfall, including flooding and landslides. Dense root networks play a vital role in environmental stability by physically anchoring topsoil to prevent erosion and land degradation. Additionally, these subterranean systems act as efficient carbon sinks, capturing atmospheric carbon and sequestering it underground, and mitigating climate change. The central Savaiʻi rainforest, the largest contiguous rainforest in Polynesia, covers an area of 72,699 hectares (726.99 square kilometres; 280.69 square miles).

=== Montane forests ===
At elevations above 500 m (1,600 ft), moisture levels increase significantly, with rainfall reaching 5,000 mm at an elevation of 600 m (2,000 ft). In this zone, Planchonella forest transitions into montane forest where Dysoxylum huntii is dominant Although widespread in lowland forests, Dysoxylum species are more sparsely distributed at higher altitudes. Species that are found in the canopy in montane forests include Astronidium spp., Bischofia javanica, Fagraea berteroana, Hernandia moerenhoutiana, Polyscias spp., Spiraeanthemum samoense, Syzygium spp., and Trichospermum richii.

=== Swamp forest ===
Swamp forests grow in soil saturated with fresh water. These habitats are found near the coast and further inland. On the south coast of Upolu island, swamp forests are mostly made up of Inocarpus fagifer trees, while the west coast is scattered with Erythrina fusca trees. Inland, swamps form in low basins and volcanic craters that do not drain well. The Fogalepolo crater in eastern Upolu has Pandanus tectorius trees in the middle and Barringtonia samoensis trees around the edge. The upland swamp forest is the rarest vegetation community in the country with only one area remaining.

=== Littoral scrub ===
Scaevola taccada

Littoral scrub is a coastal vegetation type that grows on both rocky and sandy substrates, typically occurring between the herbaceous coastal strand zone and Pandanus scrub or littoral forest. The community is generally dominated by beach naupaka, and sea daisy. Other characteristic species associated with this habitat include Indian privet, latherleaf, Ficus scabra, and Premna serratifolia.

=== Littoral forests ===
Littoral forests occupy a narrow ecological zone on rocky or sandy substrates, positioned between seaward coastal vegetation and inland lowland forests. As the most extensive coastal community, it is typically dominated by a single arboreal species, most notably fish-poison tree, Tamanu, lantern tree, grand devil's-claws, or tropical almond. Other taxa characteristic of the zone include coconut palm, Milo, and octopus bush. The forest floor typically remains thinly vegetated. Beach sheoak is conspicuously absent as a naturalised species in the littoral zones of Samoa and American Samoa.

=== Mangrove forests ===
Mangrove trees on Upolu Island

Mangrove forests are dominated by the oriental mangrove Bruguiera gymnorhiza, typically in sheltered coastal bays and estuaries with freshwater inflows. These habitats are subject to regular inundation by tidal saltwater or brackish water, as well as periodic freshwater flooding. The dense canopy shades the understory, restricting regeneration primarily to Bruguiera seedlings, although canopy gaps host populations of Acrostichum aureum, the mangrove fern, and of the mangrove tree Rhizophora samoensis. Bruguiera forests on the south coast.

=== Cloud forests ===
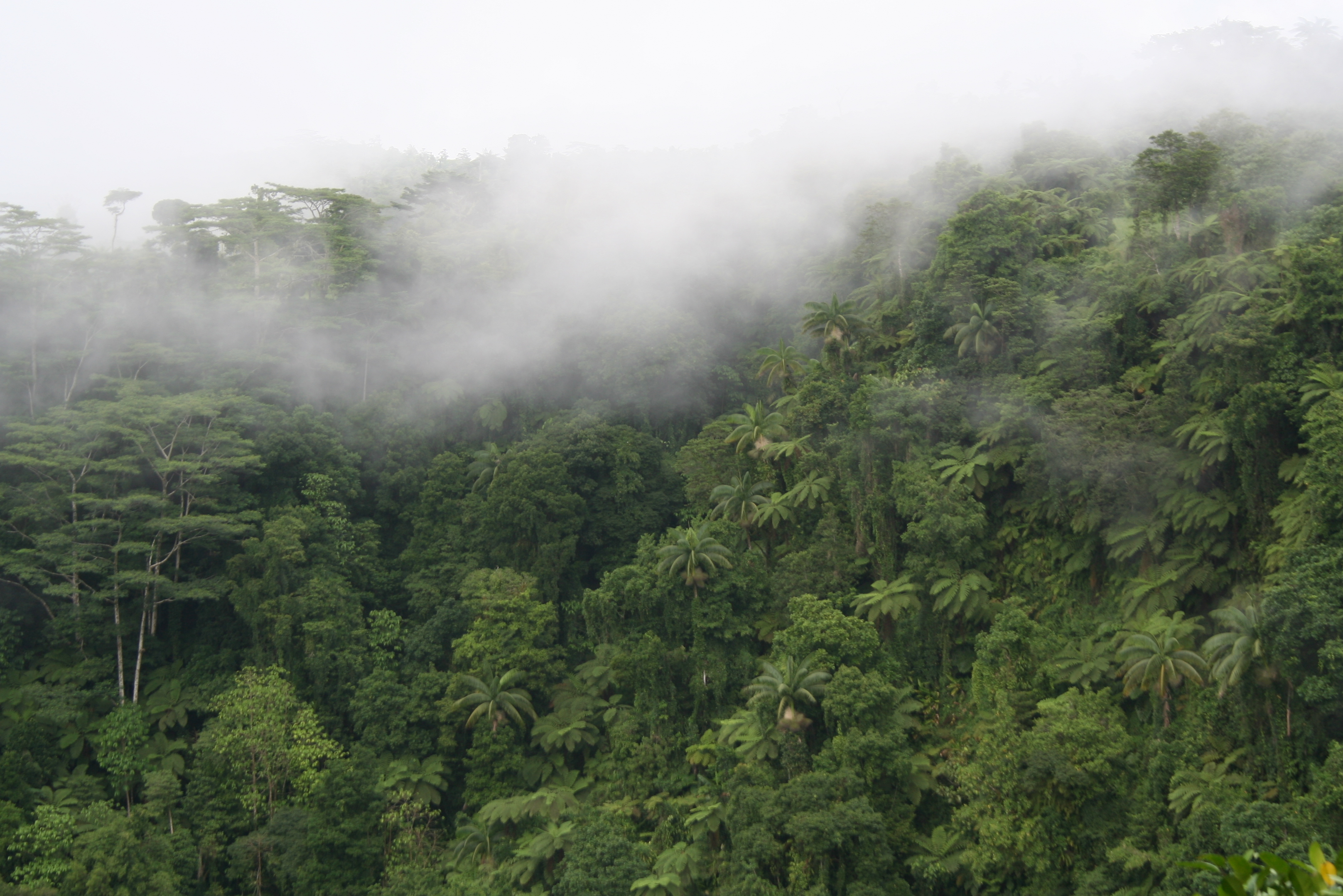
Cloud forests

Cloud forests cover an area of about 141 km^{2} (54 sq mi) representing around 5% of the total land area of the islands. It covers the majority of the Savai'i highlands, supported by a perennially wet environment that receives over 600 cm of annual rainfall with no distinct dry season. During the day, the summit of Savai'i is typically enveloped in dense clouds as warm, moist trade winds ascend the mountain slopes. These habitats typically have saturated wet conditions and a heavy covering of epiphytes on tree branches and trunks. On Savaiʻi, a medium-height cloud forest grows on permeable substrate above 1,200 m (3,900 ft) on the more recent lava flows on Mount Silisili. In contrast, gnarled, low forests are found on poorly drained substrates like those on Ta'u in American Samoa. The Savaiʻi cloud forest has a 15 to 20 m (49 to 66 ft) high canopy dominated by Dysoxylum huntii, Omalanthus acuminatus, Reynoldsia pleiosperma, and Weinmannia samoense. Coprosma savaiiense, Psychotria xanthochlora, Spiraeanthemum samoense, and Streblus anthropophagorum are common.

=== Volcanic scrub ===
Volcanic scrub vegetation on lava flows

The volcanic scrub of Savaiʻi is a pioneer rainforest ecosystem found on relatively young lava flows formed between 1750 and 1911. There is a lowland subtype seen at elevations of approximately 200 m (660 ft) and a separate montane subtype. The lowland subtype has trees such as Fagraea berteroana and Glochidion ramiflorum emerging above the scrub, the shrub Morinda citrifolia, and fern species including Davallia solida and Nephrolepis hirsutula.

The montane type at 700 m (2,300 ft), includes the trees Metrosideros vitiensis and Pterophylla affinis alongside species from the genera Fagraea and Glochidion. A higher zone at 1,500 m (4,900 ft) is dominated by endemic species such as Coprosma strigulosa, Spiraeanthemum samoense, and Vaccinium whitmeei. Localised ash plains occur at this upper elevation, which lack shrub cover and are dominated by grasses and lichens.

=== Montane meadow scrub ===
Montane meadow vegatation of Mount Silisili

This ecosystem of Savai'i is situated within poorly drained valleys and ancient volcanic craters. One of these sites is located in a shallow crater south of Mt. Silisili at an elevation of 1,650 m (5,410 ft), and features low-growing herbaceous vegetation under 30 cm (12 in) tall, primarily dominated by Carex samoensis, Paspalum orbiculare, and Lycopodium cernuum. The crater likely fills with a shallow lake during periods of intense rainfall. The second, larger meadow lies adjacent to the southern base of Mt. Silisili and consists of a dense, nearly uniform expanse of the sedge Carex graeffeana reaching heights of up to 1 metre, with standing water observed in a central trough.

=== Montane scrub ===
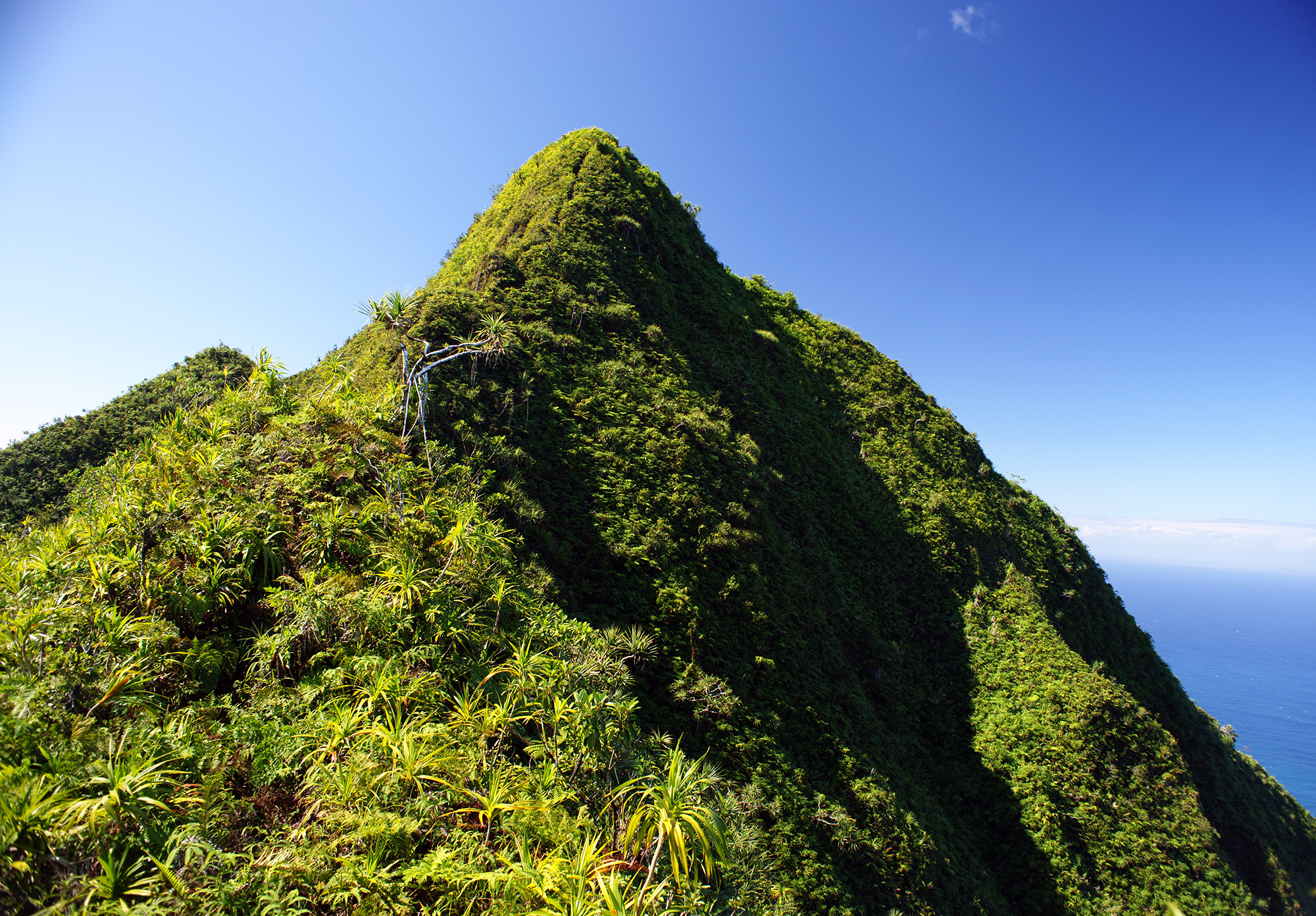
Montane scrub vegetation in Matafao peak, Tutulia

Tutuila's montane scrub grows exclusively on the weathered soils of ancient volcanic cores called trachyte plugs (Whistler 1980). This natural community features scattered trees—including Pandanus reineckei, Rapanea myricifolia, and Metrosideros collina—within a dense understory of shrubs, climbers, and ferns. Common understory plants include Freycinetia spp. and the fern Dipteris conjugata, which is unique to this Tutuila habitat within Samoa. While structurally similar to local fernlands due to the presence of Dicranopteris linearis, this scrub is entirely natural rather than anthropogenic.

=== Summit scrub ===
The summit region of Ta‘ū in American Samoa is covered by low, scrubby vegetation, though its high rainfall and minimal human disturbance would typically favor a montane forest. This community developed largely due to hurricanes in 1987 and 1990, leaving scattered trees outnumbered by dead snags. The flora is dominated by Freycinetia storckii, shrubs (Cyrtandra spp.), and terrestrial ferns (Dicksonia brackenridgei, Blechnum vulcanicum, and Cyathea spp.). Unlike montane scrub, the false staghorn fern (Dicranopteris linearis) is entirely absent from the island, while the invasive weed Clidemia hirta has become common since 1976 This extensive storm damage may be tied to the island's small size, as larger islands like Savai‘i and ‘Upolu historically supported high-canopy forests at similar elevations.

== Threats ==
=== Habitat loss ===
Since human arrival approximately 3,000 years ago, over 80 percent of the lowland rainforest has been destroyed by unregulated logging and commercial agriculture. On the heavily populated island of Upolu, nearly all accessible lowland, montane, and cloud forests have been cleared. Environmental pressures were further aggravated by two severe cyclones in 1990 and 1991, which killed 53 percent of native forest trees. Threats to habitat include cyclones, tsunamis, drought, and fire, but the plants of the islands have evolved in the presence of these natural threats and have some ability to recover.

=== Invasive species ===
Castilla elastica: One of Samoa's invasive plants

About 40% of flowering plants in the country are introduced. Invasive plant species include the convolvulus species Decalobanthus peltatus (fue lautetele), Castilla elastica (African rubber tree), Cordia alliodora (salmwood), Spathodea campanulata (African tulip tree) and Hyptis pectinata. Over 50% of all lowland rainforest in the country is dominated by Decalobanthus peltatus. Feral goats also cause damage in forests.

Rattan palms (Calamus caesius) are invasive and contribute to forest degradation and habitat loss by damaging surrounding vegetation and disrupting natural forest regeneration. They were introduced in the 1990s as part of a cane furniture project. The plant's sharp spines present a physical hazard to humans navigating the forest undergrowth, as they can easily snag clothing and skin. A project for eradication of rattan palm was established in 2006.

A report to the Samoan Government in 2002 warned that one of the critical threats to native forests was the Dieffenbachia seguine (dumb cane) which had escaped cultivation and spread into areas like the Vailima Reserve. The report also warned of numerous cultivated species with a high potential to spread further across the islands, including Abelmoschus moschatus (musk mallow), Allamanda cathartica (yellow trumpet vine), Calliandra surinamensis (Surinamese stickpea), Cascabela thevetia (yellow oleander), Duranta erecta (golden dewdrop), Senna alata (candle bush), Syzygium jambos (rose apple), and Tithonia diversifolia (tree marigold).

== Conservation ==
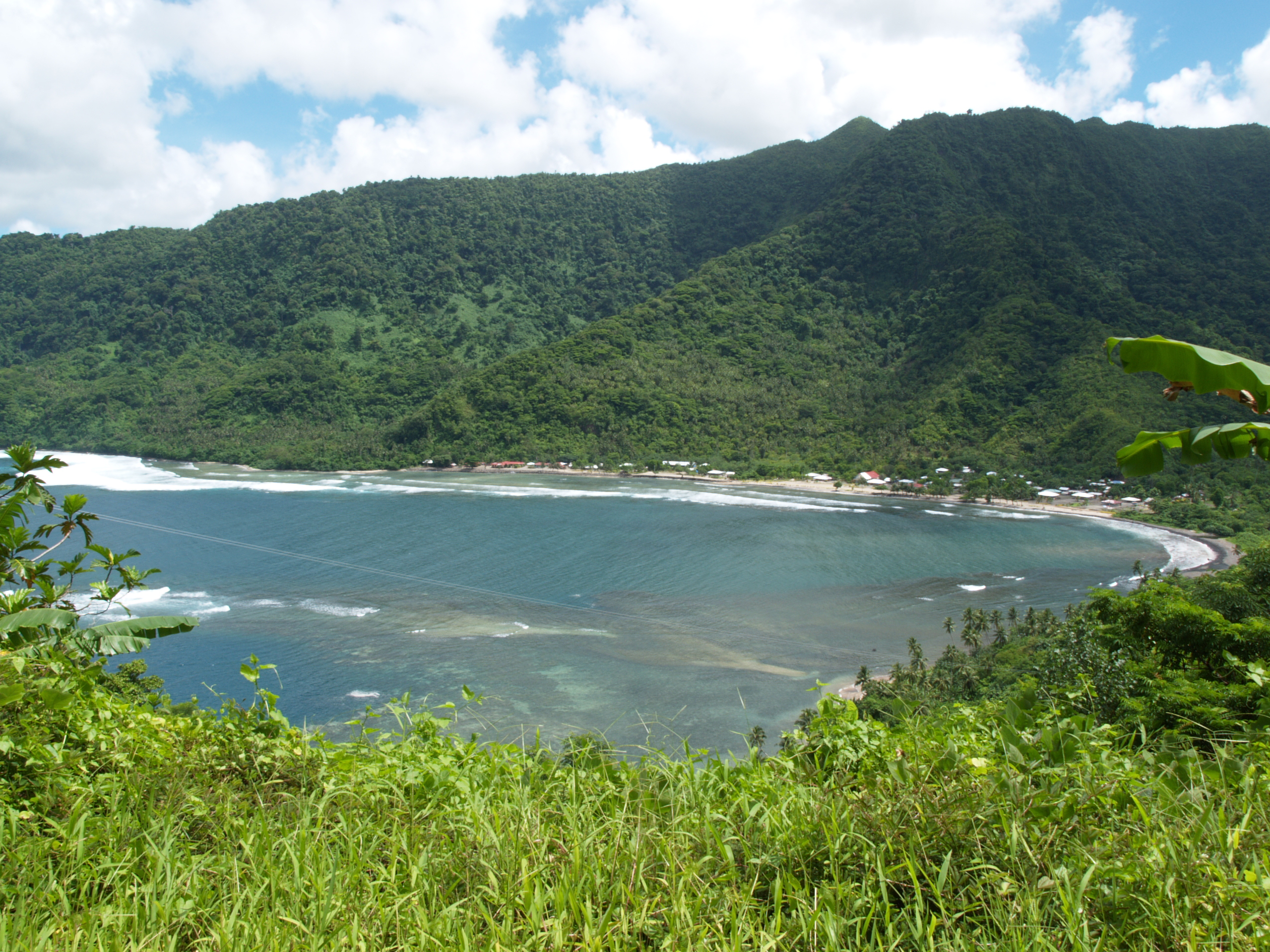
Fagaloa Bay: A conservation zone where many of Samoa's endemic flora are found

Following its 1994 ratification of the legally binding Convention on Biological Diversity, Samoa established national strategies for ecosystem conservation and sustainable development. Consequently, protected regions expanded to account for 5% of the nation's terrestrial area by 2010.

=== Falealupo Rainforest Preserve ===
The village of Falealupo in Savaiʻi has traditional ownership of a large area of lowland rainforest. In 1988, the village faced government demands that they fund a new schoolhouse or lose the teachers from the village. The village leaders considered they had no funding option other than selling a part of the rainforest to pay for the school. At the time that logging began, an ethnobotanist Paul Cox was living in the village. He made a commitment to village leaders that he would raise funds for the school if the village would grant a covenant to protect the rainforest. Agreement was reached and the funds were raised in six months. A convenant was signed protecting the 12,000 ha (30,000 acres) rainforest preserve. The village has subsequently developed ecotourism in the rainforest, including the construction of a canopy walkway through the forest.

=== Vailima Botanical Gardens ===
In 2020, work began on a new conservation garden at the Vailima Botanical Gardens. The Art Whistler Memorial Garden for rare and threatened plants was formally opened in 2021 by Samoan Prime Minister Fiamē Naomi Mata'afa. Established in memory of Arthur Whistler, an ethnobotanist who specialized in Samoan flora, the garden preserves more than 10 of the country's rare and threatened plant species. Many of these plants are endemic to the islands, such as the pau (Manilkara samoensis), which natively grows only on Savaiʻi. The Samoa Conservation Society collects plants from locations on Upolu such as Mount Le Pue, Mount Vaivai, and Malololelei, and on Savaiʻi from Mount Matavanu, Safotu, Falealupo, and Aopo. The initiative focuses on rare endemic species, as well as rare non-endemic plants, including medicinal plants such as matalafi (Psychotria insularum), and butterfly-hosting species like talafalu (Micromelum minutum). These specimens are relocated to the Vailima Botanical Gardens for preservation and public education. The project builds community capacity by supporting village-led nurseries in the villages, with plans to expand local propagation efforts to more villages.

== Human uses ==
In speaking about the need to retain traditional knowledge about Samoan plants, Galumalemana Steven Percival of Samoa's Tiapapata Art Centre has said:

Plants are not simply resources. In Samoa, they are connected to ceremony, identity, healing, craftsmanship, house and canoe building, language, and cultural memory. When plant knowledge is lost, we lose more than information. We lose part of the cultural and ecological relationship that has sustained our communities for generations.

=== Everyday objects ===
Pandanus species are used for weaving fine baskets, and mats and the tava tree, Pometia pinnata, provides materials for canoes and tools. Every part of the coconut tree is used to create essential everyday items. Hollowed-out mature shells serve as utensils, scoops, and containers for liquids, dyes, or fishing gear. The durable, flexible leaves are woven into baskets, food trays, clothing accessories, floor mats, and thatch for traditional homes. Fibres from the outer husk are twisted into sennit, a strong cord highly resistant to saltwater that is used to lash together houses and outrigger canoes. Additionally, the husk provides fuel for heat, while its loose fibres serve as strainers for traditional drinks like kava. The kava cup is also made from half polished coconut shell.

Traditional woven fans are handcrafted using finely sliced, sun-bleached leaves from pandanus, coconut, and fan palms. The intricate weaving is built upon a sturdy pandanus stem base and enhanced with natural nut dyes. Beyond its practical use for cooling, the fan's design carries symbolic importance, mimicking the traditional shape of a canoe paddle or a spear tip.

The ili pau is a traditional Samoan hand-held fan that is different from the normal woven fans used all over the Pacific. It is constructed from the thinly sliced wood of the pau or manapau tree (Mamea odorata). Unlike typical Samoan fans woven from coconut or pandanus leaves, these wooden variations are distinctly smaller with narrower proportions. Artisans carve intricate geometric patterns and open fretwork directly into the thin wood, transforming the fan into a lightweight, delicate cultural accessory.

=== Special objects ===
Broussonetia papyrifera (the paper mulberry tree), has a bark that is collected for making tapa cloth (siapo). The bark is peeled off, scraped, pounded, and made into flexible sheets. These are assembled into a larger canvas, which is then decorated.

The teuila (Alpinia purpurata) Is the national flower of Samoa. A festival held every year in Samoa used to be named after the plant, showcasing food stalls, cultural items, and sports events.

The 'ulafala is a ceremonial necklace that designates leadership and high social standing. While often utilised to identify special guests or act as a formal adornment, it is traditionally worn by tulafale (orator chiefs) during public performances. The necklace is constructed from the carpels of the Pandanus fruit. Since red is a hue reserved for those of elite status, the necklace may be finished in a bright red paint to heighten its visibility and significance during gatherings.

Kava cup

Woven coconut baskets

Broussonetia papyrifera, the paper mulberry

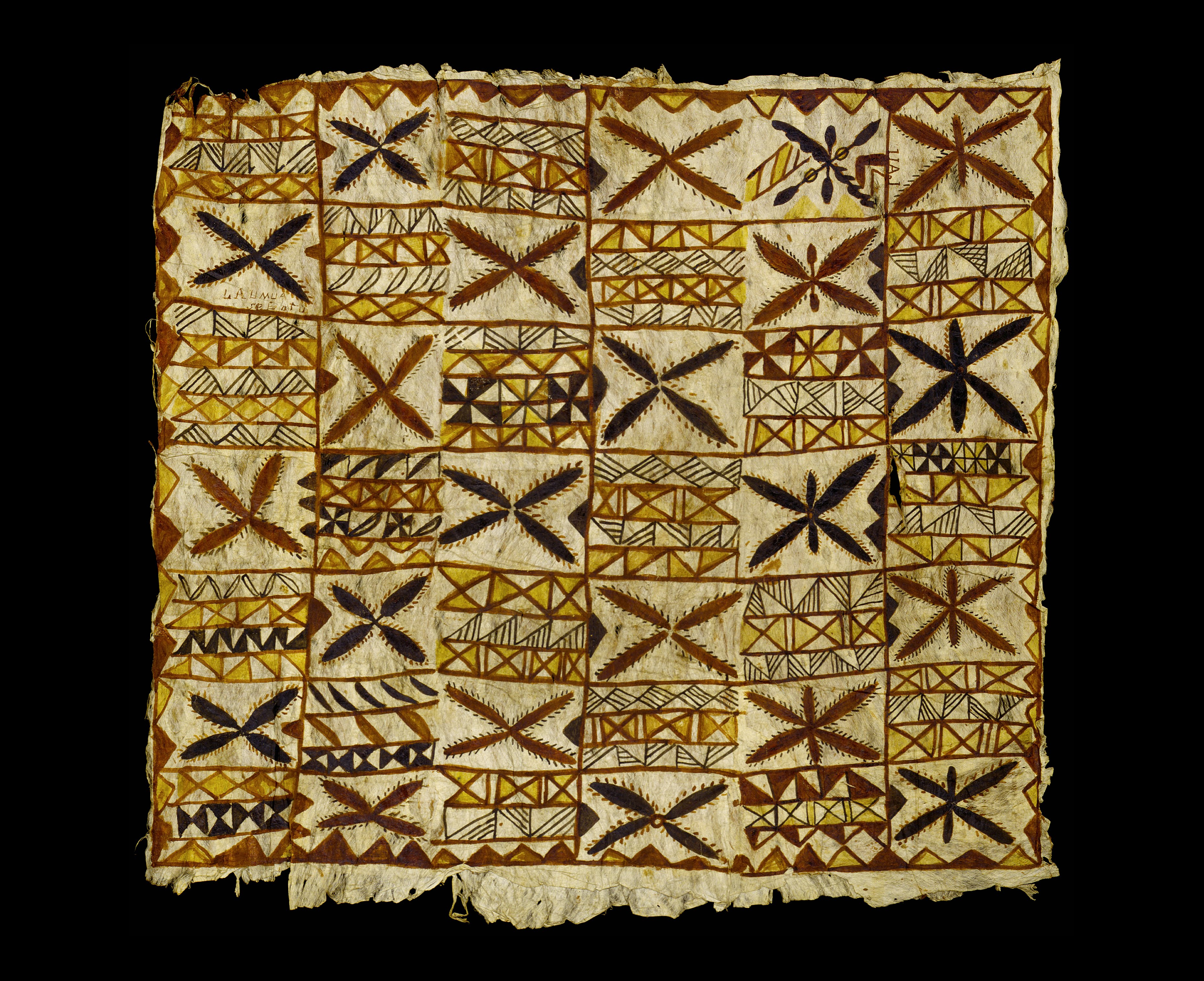
Tapa cloth, made from the paper mulberry

Pandan necklace ('Ulufala)

Fans from the 19th century

=== Medicines ===
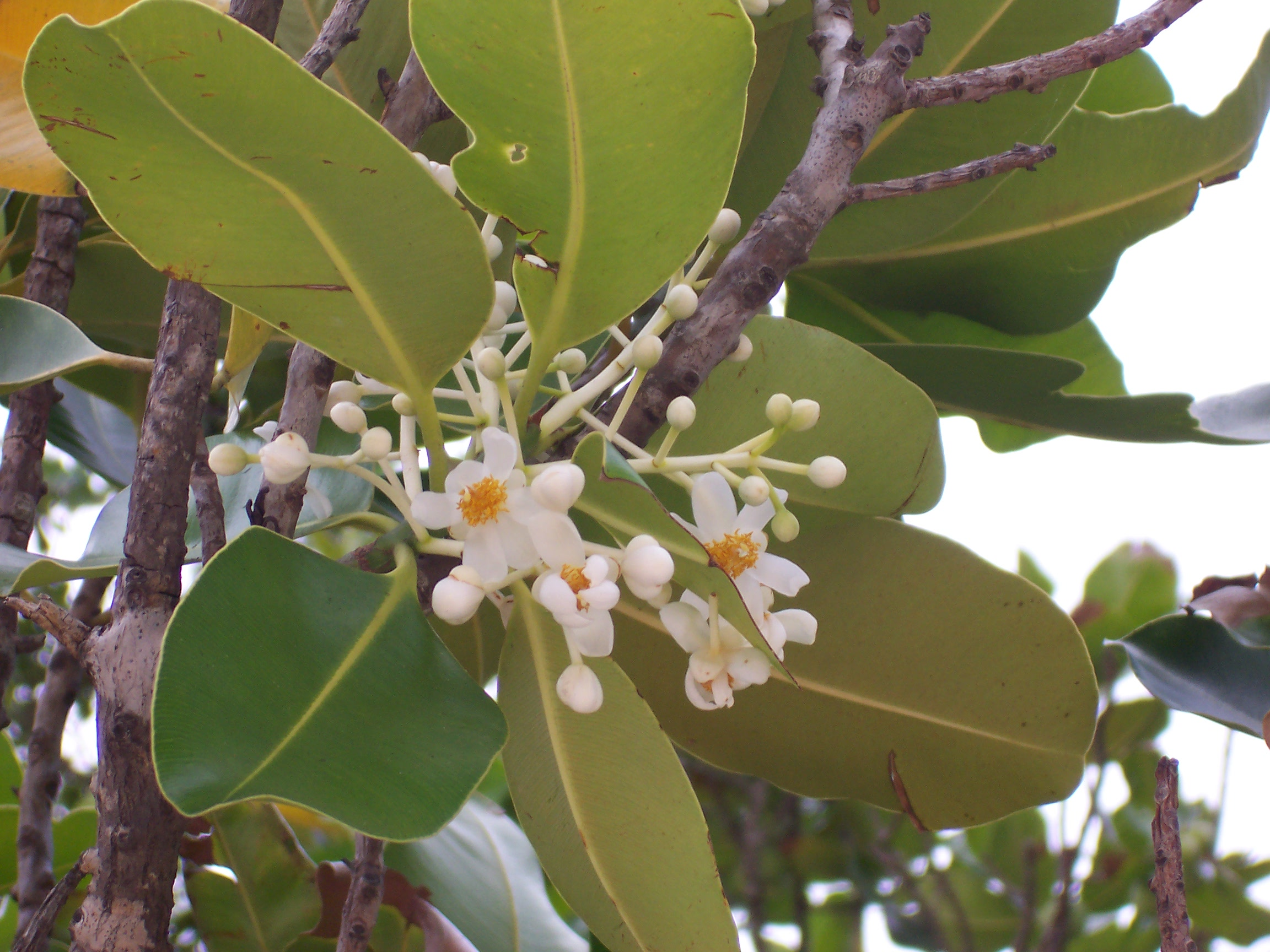
Calophyllum inophyllum is a medicinal plant traditionally used for eye injuries and diarrhoea.

About 130 plants are used in Samoa for medicinal purposes, of which about 84 are used by traditional taulasea healers. Locals use native and introduced plants for bruises and multiple other conditions, including illnesses related to ghosts. Only one fern species (Microsorum scolopendria) and one lichen species (Ramalina) are recorded as being used for medicinal purposes. Psychotria insularum (matalafi) is a plant in the Rubiaceae family that has been recorded as being used for medicinal purposes, but only in Samoa, despite it being native all around the South Pacific. It acts as an iron chelator within cells, so it has anti-inflammatory properties. Extracts of Mikania micrantha (Fue Saina), Homalanthus nutans (Mamala), and Kleinhovia hospita (Fuafua) have some antimicrobial activity.

== See also ==
- Samoan tropical moist forests
- List of endemic plants of Samoa
- List of Samoan plant common names

== Bibliography ==
- Whistler, W. Arthur (1978). "Vegetation of the Montane Region of Savai'i, Western Samoa". Pacific Science. 32 (1): 79–94.
- Whistler, Arthur (1992). "Vegetation of Samoa and Tonga". Pacific Science. 46 (2). University of Hawai'i Press: 159–178.
