= Schefflera samoensis =

Scientific classification
- Kingdom: Plantae
- Clade: Tracheophytes
- Clade: Angiosperms
- Clade: Eudicots
- Clade: Asterids
- Order: Apiales
- Family: Araliaceae
- Genus: Schefflera
- Species: S. samoensis

Binomial name
- Schefflera samoensis (A.Gray) Harms

Synonyms
- Heptapleurum samoense (A.Gray) Benth. & Hook.f. ex Drake; Paratropia samoensis A.Gray

Species of flowering plant

Schefflera samoensis is a species of flowering plants in the Araliaceae family. It is endemic to Samoa. It produces palmate compound leaves on an open canopy. It has been found on the island of Savaiʻi, on Mount Matavanu, in wet forest that grows on inner slopes of the crater.

== See also ==
- Flora of Samoa
- Samoan tropical moist forests
