= Platylepis heteromorpha =

Scientific classification
- Kingdom: Plantae
- Clade: Tracheophytes
- Clade: Angiosperms
- Clade: Monocots
- Order: Asparagales
- Family: Orchidaceae
- Subfamily: Orchidoideae
- Tribe: Cranichideae
- Genus: Platylepis
- Species: P. heteromorpha

Binomial name
- Platylepis heteromorpha Rchb.f.

Synonyms
- Moerenhoutia heteromorpha (P.J.Cribb) M.A.Clem. & D.L.Jones; Erporkis heteromorpha (Rchb.f.) Kuntze; Coralliokyphos candidissimum H.Fleischm. & Rech.

Species of flowering plant

Platylepis heteromorpha is a species of flowering plant in the orchid family. It is native to Samoa. It is a rhizomatous geophyte and grows primarily in the wet tropical biome.

== See also ==
- Flora of Samoa
- Samoan tropical moist forests
- List of endemic plants of Samoa
