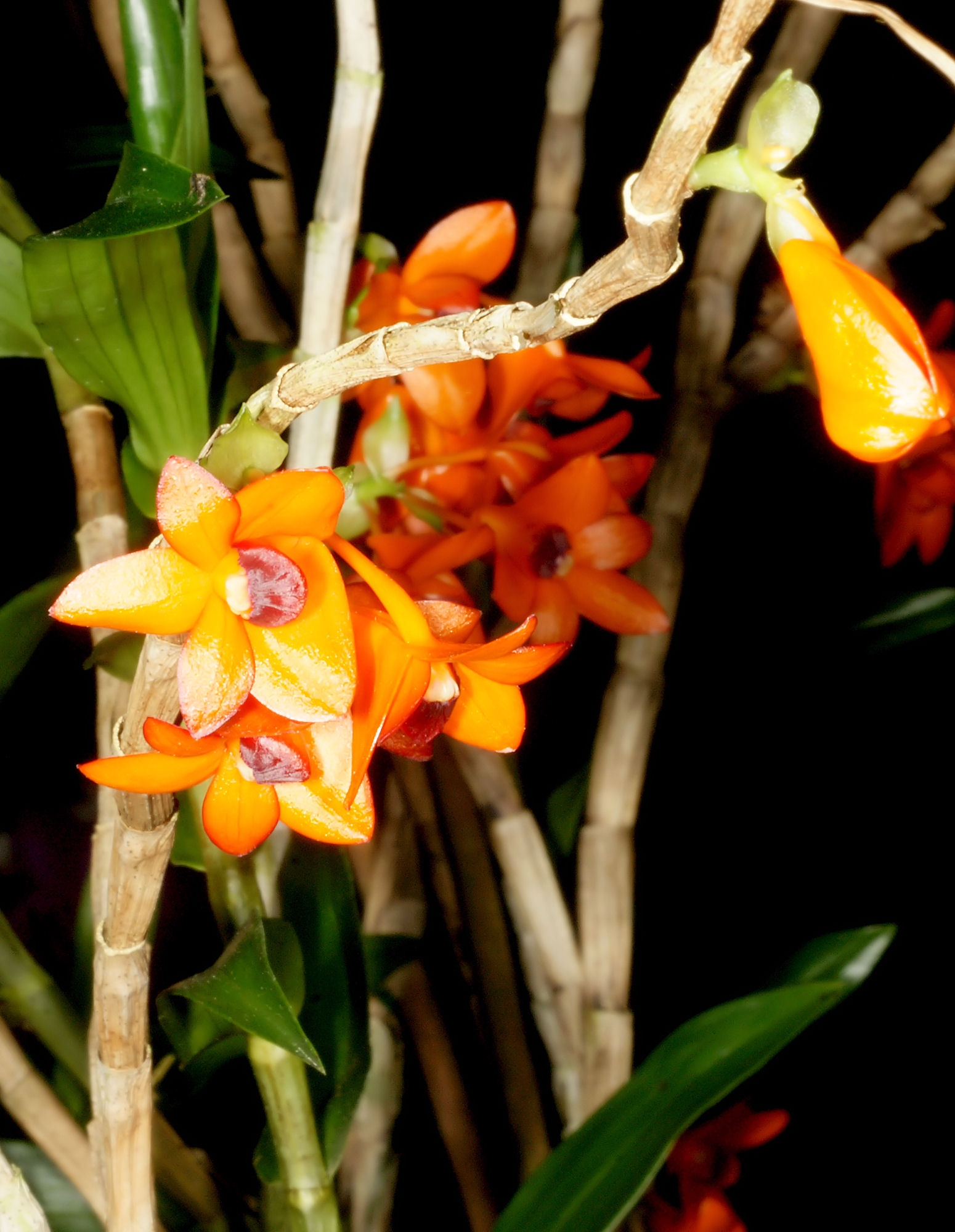

Scientific classification
- Kingdom: Plantae
- Clade: Embryophytes
- Clade: Tracheophytes
- Clade: Angiosperms
- Clade: Monocots
- Order: Asparagales
- Family: Orchidaceae
- Subfamily: Epidendroideae
- Genus: Dendrobium
- Species: D. mohlianum

Binomial name
- Dendrobium mohlianum Rchb.f.

Synonyms
- Dendrobium neoebudanum Schltr.; Dendrobium vitellinum Kraenzl.; Pedilonum neoebudanum (Schltr.) Rauschert.; Pedilonum vitellinum (Kraenzl.) Rauschert.

= Dendrobium mohlianum =

Species of flowering plant

Dendrobium mohlianum, also known as Mohl's dendrobium, is a species of epiphytic or lithophytic orchid. The orchid Dendrobium mohlianum is a medium to large, cool-climate species native to the high-altitude mountain and cloud forests of Melanesia and some of Polynesia.

== Description ==
It grows best at elevations between 1,500 and 2,300 metres (4,900 and 7,500 ft), featuring clusters of slender, cascading stems with slightly swollen bases and narrow, lance-shaped leaves arranged in two neat rows. From late winter through early summer, short flower stalks sprout near the tops of older, leafless stems, each producing four to six vibrant blossoms. In its natural habitat, this orchid relies on native birds for pollination.

== Distribution ==
This plant is native to Fiji, Solomon Islands, and Vanuatu, and is native to Samoa.

== See also ==
- Flora of Samoa
- Samoan tropical moist forests
- Fiji tropical moist forests
