= Vaccinium whitmeei =

Scientific classification
- Kingdom: Plantae
- Clade: Tracheophytes
- Clade: Angiosperms
- Clade: Eudicots
- Clade: Asterids
- Order: Ericales
- Family: Ericaceae
- Genus: Vaccinium
- Species: V. whitmeei

Binomial name
- Vaccinium whitmeei F.Muell.

Synonyms
- Vaccinium antipodum Reinecke

Species of flowering plant

Vaccinium whitmeei, the Samoan blueberry, is a species of flowering plant in the heath family, Ericaceae. It is endemic to Samoa. It is found above 700 m (2,300 ft) elevation and is only found in montane volcanic scrub, on the highest lava flows. Unlike many Samoan plants, which came from Southeast Asia and New Guinea, the species likely has origins from the temperate Americas.

== See also ==
- Flora of Samoa
- List of endemic plants of Samoa
- Samoan tropical moist forests
