= Vailima Botanical Gardens =

Botanic garden in Samoa

- Interactive map of Vailima Botanical Gardens
- Type: Botanical garden
- Location: Vailima, Samoa
- Coordinates: 13.8648°S 171.7654°W
- Area: 12 ha (30 acres)

The Vailima Botanical Gardens are located within the Vailima National Reserve on the island of Upolu in Samoa, approximately 5 km (3.1 mi) from Apia on the cross-island road. The botanical gardens are next to the Robert Louis Stevenson Museum and take their name from the nearby village of Vailima. The gardens are a popular visitor attraction.

== History ==
The Scottish author Robert Louis Stevenson moved with his family to Samoa for health reasons, and in 1890 purchased 127 ha (314 acres) of land on the slopes of Mount Vaea on the island of Upolu. He constructed the first two-storey house in Samoa on the property, and named it Vailima after the local area.

Samoa was a German protectorate from 1900 to 1920. The German imperial administration purchased the Vailima estate in 1900 to serve as the official residence for the German Governor, Wilhelm Solf. The gardens of the Vailima estate were originally established by German botanist Gustav Hermann Schmitz in the 1900s, during the German Samoa period. Schmitz remained the director of the gardens until his death in 1933.

The National Parks and Reserves Act was passed in 1974. In 1978, the Mt Vaea Scenic Reserve, Vailima Botanical Gardens and Stephenson’s Memorial Reserve were established as the Tusitala Historic and Nature Reserve, covering 150 ha (370 acres).

In 1982, an advisor for the South Pacific Commission recommended the development of a master plan for the Vailima Botanical Gardens and suggested that the gardens should "attempt to collect and grow all of the native plants of Samoa, preferably in their natural groupings or associations".

A master plan for the development of the Vailima Botanical Gardens was prepared in 2021. In October 2024, Charles III unveiled a plaque and planted a tree to officially open the King's Garden at Vailima.

== Garden areas ==
In 2020, James Atherton of the Samoa Conservation Society proposed that a garden for rare and threatened plants should be developed at the Vailima Botanical Gardens. The new garden was established as a memorial to commemorate Arthur Whistler, an American ethnobotanist, academic and writer. Whistler, an adjunct professor at the University of Hawaii's Department of Botany, was an expert on tropical flora of the Pacific Islands, especially Samoa and Tonga. Whistler spent several decades training Samoans about the flora of their country. He sought to protect Samoa's forests through his programs, and also to resurrect some of Samoa's lost cultural and practical uses for its native plants. He was recognised for his work by being known in Samoa as Tupu o le vao — "king of the forest".

There are around 108 plants considered as threatened in Samoa. The Samoa Conservation Society, Samoa's Ministry of Natural Resources and Environment, together with Botanic Garden Conservation International, established the garden to collect and display rare and endangered species, many of which were categorised by Whistler. Work on the garden began in 2020 and the Art Whistler Memorial Garden was officially opened by Prime Minister Fiamē Naomi Mata’afa in 2021.

As of 2026, other plant collections include a medicinal plants garden, and a butterfly plants garden, with lowland and coastal rainforest collections commencing. The facilities at the botanical gardens include an information fale with a wheelchair accessible path from the entrance to the gardens. Vailima is the first national reserve in Samoa to be wheelchair accessible.

== See also ==
- Flora of Samoa
- List of Samoan plant common names
- List of protected areas of Samoa
