= Clinostigma warburgii =

Conservation status
- Least Concern (IUCN 3.1)

Scientific classification
- Kingdom: Plantae
- Clade: Tracheophytes
- Clade: Angiosperms
- Clade: Monocots
- Clade: Commelinids
- Order: Arecales
- Family: Arecaceae
- Genus: Clinostigma
- Species: C. warburgii

Binomial name
- Clinostigma warburgii Becc

Species of flowering plant

Clinostigma warburgii, also known as niu vao, is a species of flowering plant belonging to the family Arecaceae. It is a palm tree that is endemic to the Pacific island country of Samoa, specifically the island of Upolu.

== Description ==
Clinostigma warburgii is characterised by its smooth, straight, and pale trunk, which can attain a height of up to 20 m (66 ft). The trunk supports a prominent, elongated, bright green crownshaft. Above the crownshaft, the species develops a spreading crown composed of arching leaves with distinctly pendulous leaflets.

== See also ==
- Flora of Samoa
