= Christmas orchid =

Christmas orchid is a name for various orchids, flowering around the time of Christmas or otherwise popular as a Christmas decoration:

- Angraecum sesquipedale (Star of Bethlehem orchid)
- Calanthe triplicata – SE Asia, Australia, western Pacific
- Cattleya percivaliana (Percival's cattleya)
- Dendrobium cunninghamii (Winika)
- Cattleya trianae (May flower)
