= Arthur Whistler =

American botanist

Wayne Arthur Whistler
- Born: October 12, 1944; San Bernardino County, California
- Died: April 2, 2020 (aged 75); Honolulu, Hawaii
- Citizenship: United States
- Scientific career
- Fields: Flora of the tropical Pacific Islands

Wayne Arthur Whistler (October 12, 1944 – April 2, 2020) was an American ethnobotanist, academic and writer. Whistler, an adjunct professor at the University of Hawaii's Department of Botany, was an expert on tropical flora of the Pacific Islands, especially Samoa and Tonga.

== Education and career ==
Whistler was born near Death Valley in San Bernardino County, California. He earned a BA in biology from the University of California, Riverside, in 1965; an MA in botany, from the University of California, Santa Barbara, in 1966, and PhD in botany, from the University of Hawaii, in 1979. Once he completed his first two degrees, Whistler served in the Peace Corps as a teacher at Samoa College in Apia, Western Samoa (now known as Samoa). He then moved to Hawaii, where he completed a doctorate in botany from the University of Hawaii at Manoa, focusing on Samoan plant life, in 1979.

After completing his PhD, Whistler was appointed to a position at the National Tropical Botanical Garden on Kauai and served as a researcher affiliated with the Bishop Museum. He was an adjunct professor at University of Hawaii's Department of Botany and the Lyon Arboretum, a botanical garden managed by the university. He also owned a consulting company, Isle Botanica, and worked on projects focusing on plants in Fiji, the Marshall Islands, the Northern Mariana Islands, Samoa, and Tonga.

Whistler worked on research projects throughout Oceania, but specialized in the flora of Samoa and Tonga. According to colleagues, he knew the Samoan language name for nearly every native plant in that country. Whistler had first lived in Samoa during the 1970s, before logging and tourism led to the deforestation of much of the country's rainforests. As a result, he spent several decades training Samoans about the country's flora and its uses. Whistler not only sought to protect Samoa's forests through his programs, but also resurrect some of Samoa's lost cultural and practical uses for its native plant life. Due to this work he was known in Samoa as Tupu o le vao — "king of the forest".

Whistler authored more than a dozen books on the botany and ethnobotany of the Pacific Islands, including Rainforest Trees of Samoa, Polynesian Herbal Medicine, and Plants of the Canoe People: An Ethnobotanical Voyage through Polynesia, which focused on the plants utilized by Polynesian voyagers.

== Death ==
Whistler was showing symptoms of COVID-19 in March 2020. He sought treatment at a Hawaii urgent care facility, but was not tested for coronavirus, despite his symptoms. He tested positive for COVID-19 on March 8 and was placed on life support on March 10, but his condition continued to deteriorate and he died at Kaiser Moanalua Hospital in Honolulu on April 2 at the age of 75. His death was Hawaii's third fatality related to the COVID-19 pandemic. At the time of his death, Whistler had nearly completed another book called Flora of Samoa, which he had worked on for most of his professional life. The book was meant to be a definitive guide to Samoa's native plants.

Following his death the Samoa Conservation Society and Samoa's Ministry of Natural Resources and Environment established the Art Whistler Memorial Garden at the Vailima Botanical Gardens to collect and display rare and endangered species, many of which were categorised by Whistler. The garden formally opened in August 2021.

== Selected works authored ==
- Flora of Samoa: Flowering Plants. Kauai, Hawaii: National Tropical Botanical Garden. 2022. ISBN 978-0-915809-04-2.
- Rainforest Trees of Samoa: A Guide to the Common Lowland and Foothill Forest Trees of the Samoan Archipelago, University of Hawaiʻi Press. ISBN 978-0964542648
- Plants in Samoan Culture: The Ethnobotany of Samoa, University of Hawaiʻi Press. ISBN 978-0964542662
- The Samoan Rainforest: A Guide to the Vegetation of the Samoan Archipelago, University of Hawaiʻi Press. ISBN 978-0964542631
- Samoan Herbal Medicine: 'O La'au ma Vai Fofo o Samoa, University of Hawaiʻi Press. ISBN 978-0964542624
- Wayside Plants of the Islands: A Guide to the Lowland Flora of the Pacific Islands, University of Hawaiʻi Press. ISBN 978-0964542600
- Polynesian Herbal Medicine, University of Hawaiʻi Press. ISBN 978-0915809165
- Flowers of the Pacific Island Seashore: A Guide to the Littoral Plants of Hawai'i, Tahiti, Samoa, Tonga, Cook Islands, Fiji, and Micronesia, University of Hawaiʻi Press. ISBN 978-0824815288
- Tongan Herbal Medicine, University of Hawaiʻi Press. ISBN 978-0824815271
