= Samoan tropical moist forests =

Tropical moist broadleaf forests ecoregion of the Samoan Islands

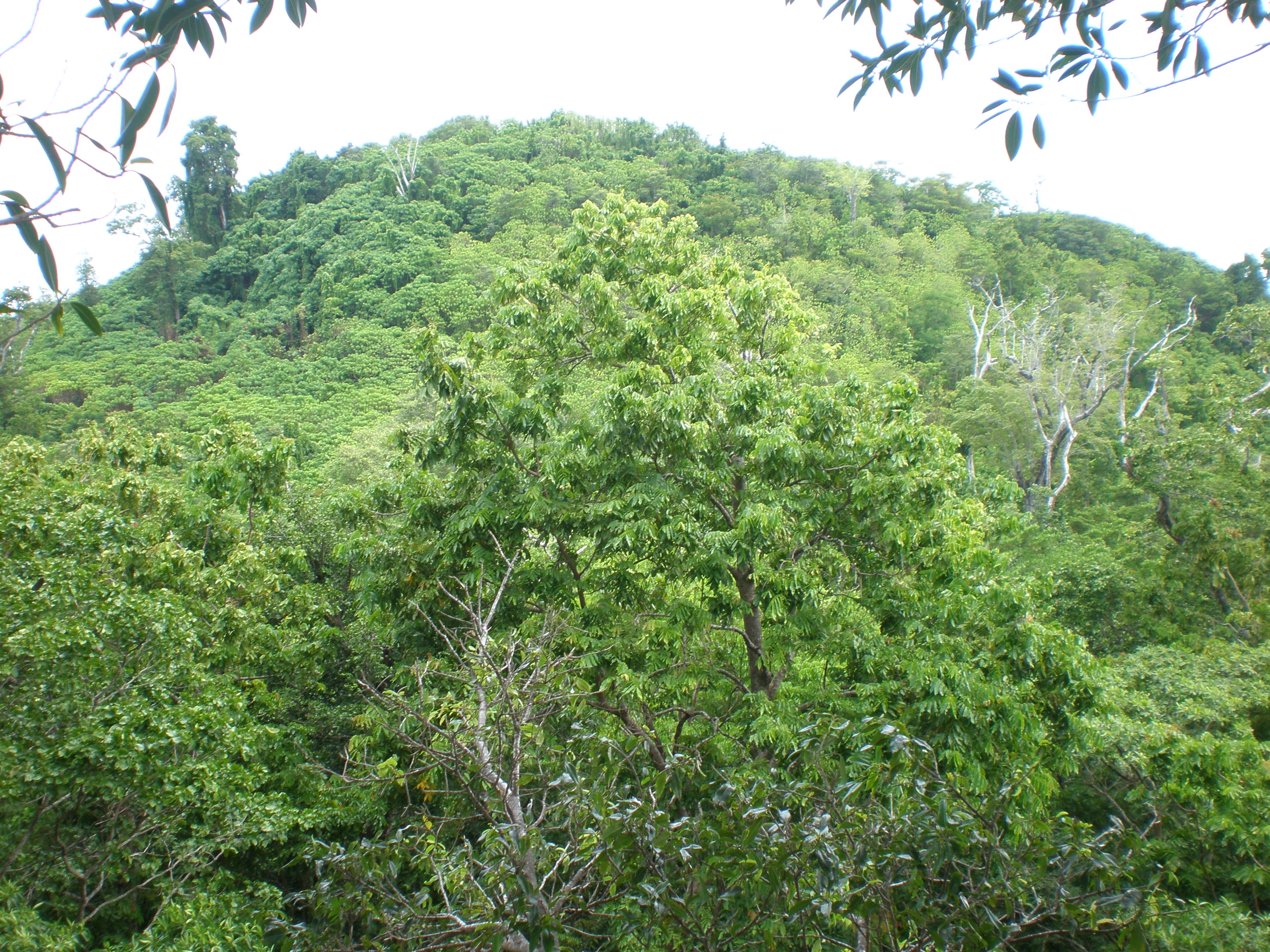
- Lowland rain forest on Savai'i

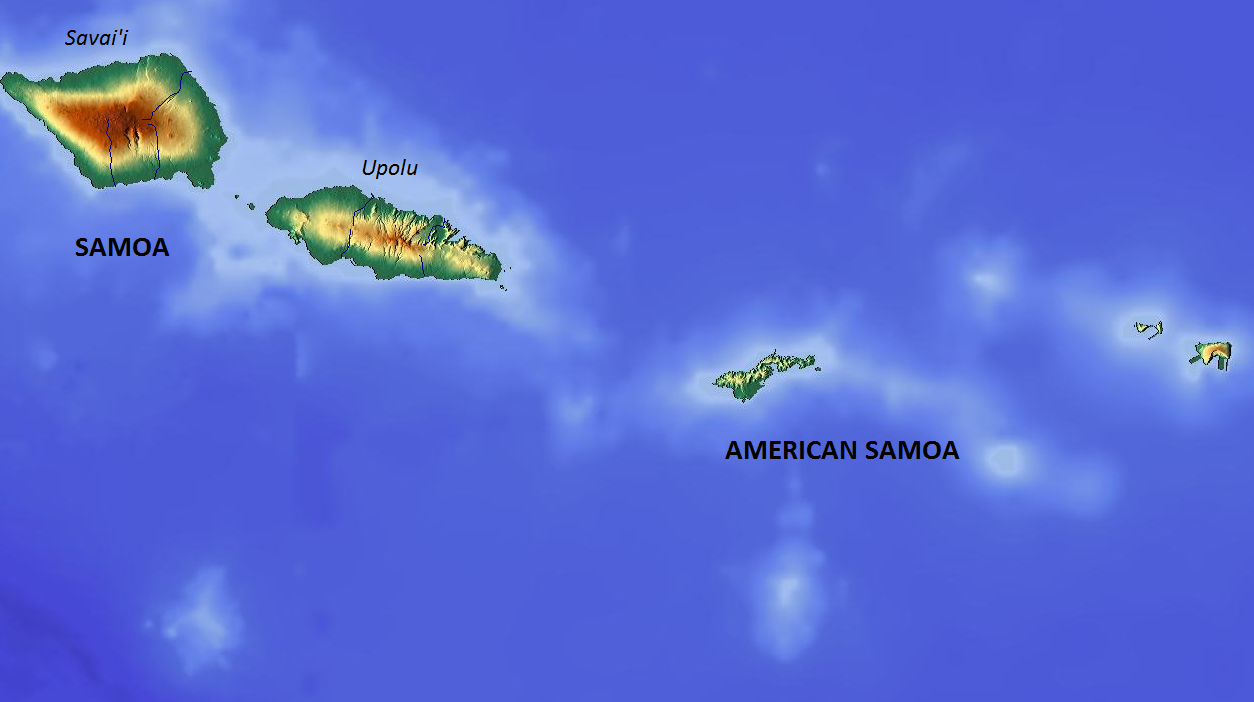
- Map of the Samoan Islands

Ecology
- Realm: Oceanian
- Biome: tropical and subtropical moist broadleaf forests

Geography
- Area: 2,763 km^{2} (1,067 mi^{2})
- Countries: Samoa; American Samoa (U.S.)

Conservation
- Conservation status: Critical/endangered
- Protected: 231 km^{2} (8%)

The Samoan tropical moist forests are a tropical moist broadleaf forest ecoregion in the Samoan Islands of the Pacific Ocean.

Approximately 30% of Samoa's biodiversity is endemic, found only in Samoa, with new species still being discovered including two new butterflies in 2009 and freshwater fish new to science. The country has more native species of ferns and butterflies than New Zealand, a country 85 times larger.

== Geography ==
The Samoan Islands are in the central Pacific Ocean. They are volcanic in origin. The islands have a total area of 3,030 km^{2} (1,170 sq mi). The largest islands in the group are Savai'i and Upolu. The islands are politically divided between Samoa, an independent country; and American Samoa, an unincorporated territory of the United States.

The islands are located south of the equator, and have a humid tropical climate. Rainfall exceeds 2,000 mm (79 in) annually.

== Flora ==
Plant communities include lowland rain forest, which is the most extensive, with montane forests and cloud forests at higher elevations. There are smaller areas of montane scrub, pandanus scrub, littoral (seashore) scrub, montane swamp forest, and summit scrub.

Lowland rainforest was once the largest plant community on the islands, although over 80% of it has been converted. Characteristic trees are Diospyros samoensis, Diospyros foliosa, Calophyllum inophyllum, Didymocheton alliaceus, Didymocheton gaudichaudianus, Pometia pinnata, Planchonella torricellensis, Myristica fatua, and species of Syzygium. Fagraea berteroana, Glochidion ramiflorum, Lepidocupania brackenridgei, and Morinda citrifolia grow on rocky lowland lava flows.

Montane rain forest grows on lower mountain slopes, which have a cooler and wetter climate than the lowlands. Didymocheton huntii is the dominant canopy tree, with Pterophylla samoensis, Canarium harveyi, Rhus taitensis, and species of Syzygium and Astronidium. Morinda citrifolia, Metrosideros vitiensis, and Pterophylla samoensis grow on upland lava flows.

Cloud forest forms on higher mountain slopes with almost continuous cloud cover and high rainfall above 650 meters elevation. Typical cloud forest trees are Polyscias pleiosperma, Pterophylla samoensis, Didymocheton huntii, and Coprosma savaiiensis. Tree ferns (Cyathea spp.), the fern Dicranopteris linearis, and the climber Freycinetia storckii grow in the forest understory.

Low scrubby plants, including the Samoan endemics Vaccinium whitmeei, Spiraeanthemum samoense, and Coprosma strigulosa, grow on the highest-elevation lava flows.

The Central Savai'i Rainforest, comprising an area of 727 square kilometres (281 sq mi) on the island of Savai'i in the Samoan Islands, is the largest continuous patch of rainforest in Polynesia. The area contains more than 100 volcanic craters including recent lava flows. The rainforest spans the inland region of the island, and includes montane forest and cloud forest which contain most of Samoa's endemic native species, many of which are threatened or near extinction. The endemic shrub Metrosideros gregoryi is known only from Matavanu crater on Savai'i.

Littoral or coastal strand plant communities include trees and shrubs like Scaevola taccada, Pandanus tectorius, Barringtonia asiatica, Calophyllum inophyllum, Pisonia grandis, and coconut palm (Cocos nucifera) which are widespread along seacoasts in the Indo-Pacific region.

== Fauna ==
Endemic birds include the rare and unusual tooth-billed pigeon (Didinculus strigirostris), known locally as manumea and Samoa's national bird, and other birds such as the maomao honeyeater (Gymnomyza samoensis). The Samoan white-eye (Zosterops samoensis) and Samoan moorhen (Gallinula pacifica) are both endemic to Savai'i. The Samoan moorhen was last recorded in 1873 with possible sightings in 1984 at the upland forests and at Mount Silisili in 2003.

== Conservation ==
Most of Samoa's land is under customary ownership, about 81% of which is governed at the local level by matai, the chiefly heads of families. Conservation projects therefore take place in partnership with matai, such as the lowland rainforest preserve in Falealupo village, at the western tip of Savai'i and Tafua village on the south east coast.

Some of the islands' plants are used for food, fiber, and traditional Samoan medicine (see Samoan plant names).

In 1994, Samoa ratified the international and legally binding treaty, the Convention on Biological Diversity to develop national strategies for conservation and sustainable use of biological diversity. By 2010 protected areas in the country covered 5% of land.

Protected areas include Cornwall National Park (24.94 km^{2}), Lata National Park (49.92 km^{2}), and Mauga o Salafai National Park (59.73 km^{2}) on Savai'i, Lake Lanotoo National Park (4.7 km^{2}) and O Le Pupu-Puʿe National Park (50.19 km^{2}) on Upolu, and the National Park of American Samoa on Tutuila, Ofu, and Ta‘ū.

== Gallery ==
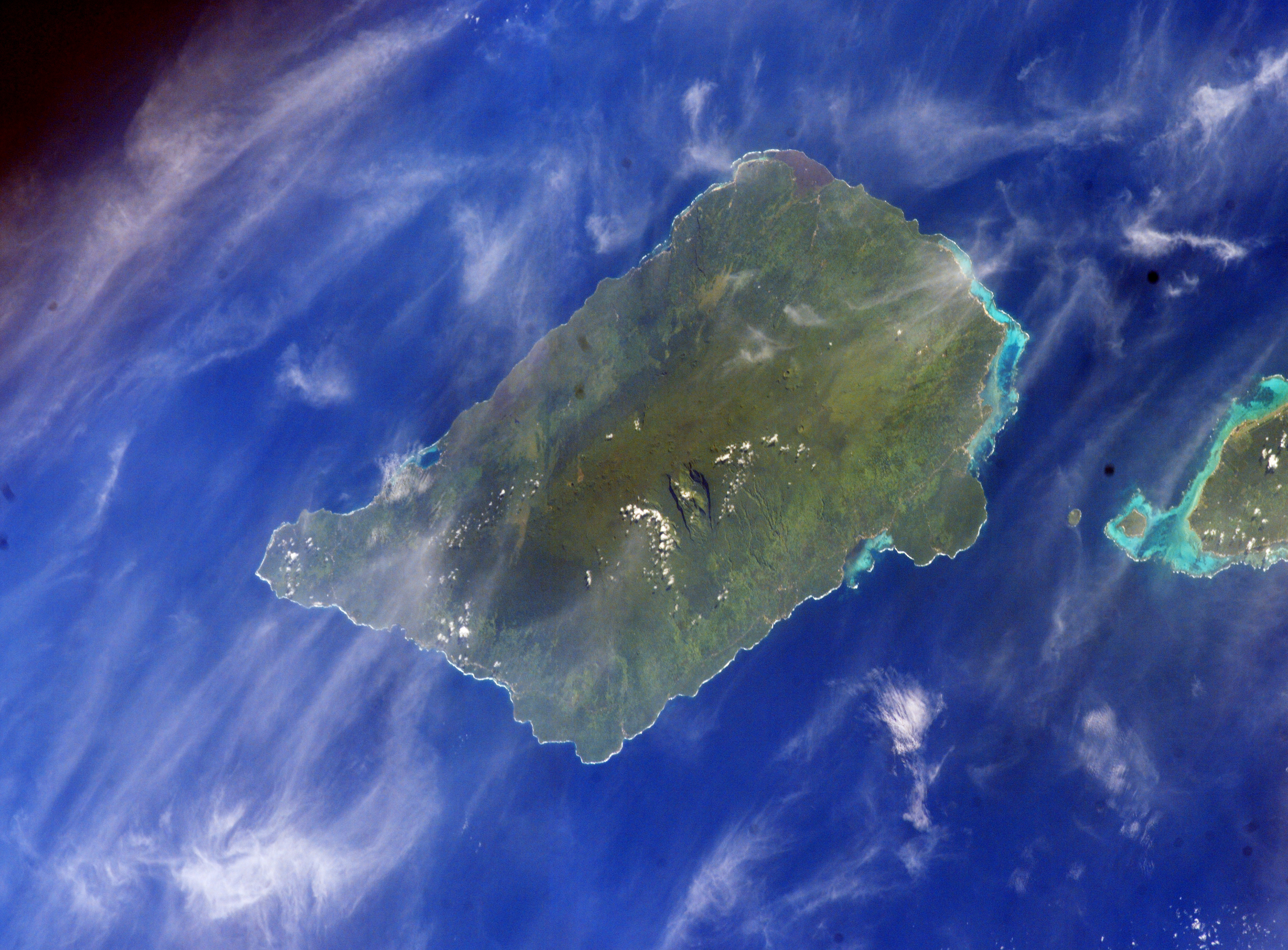
NASA satellite photo of Savai'i island.

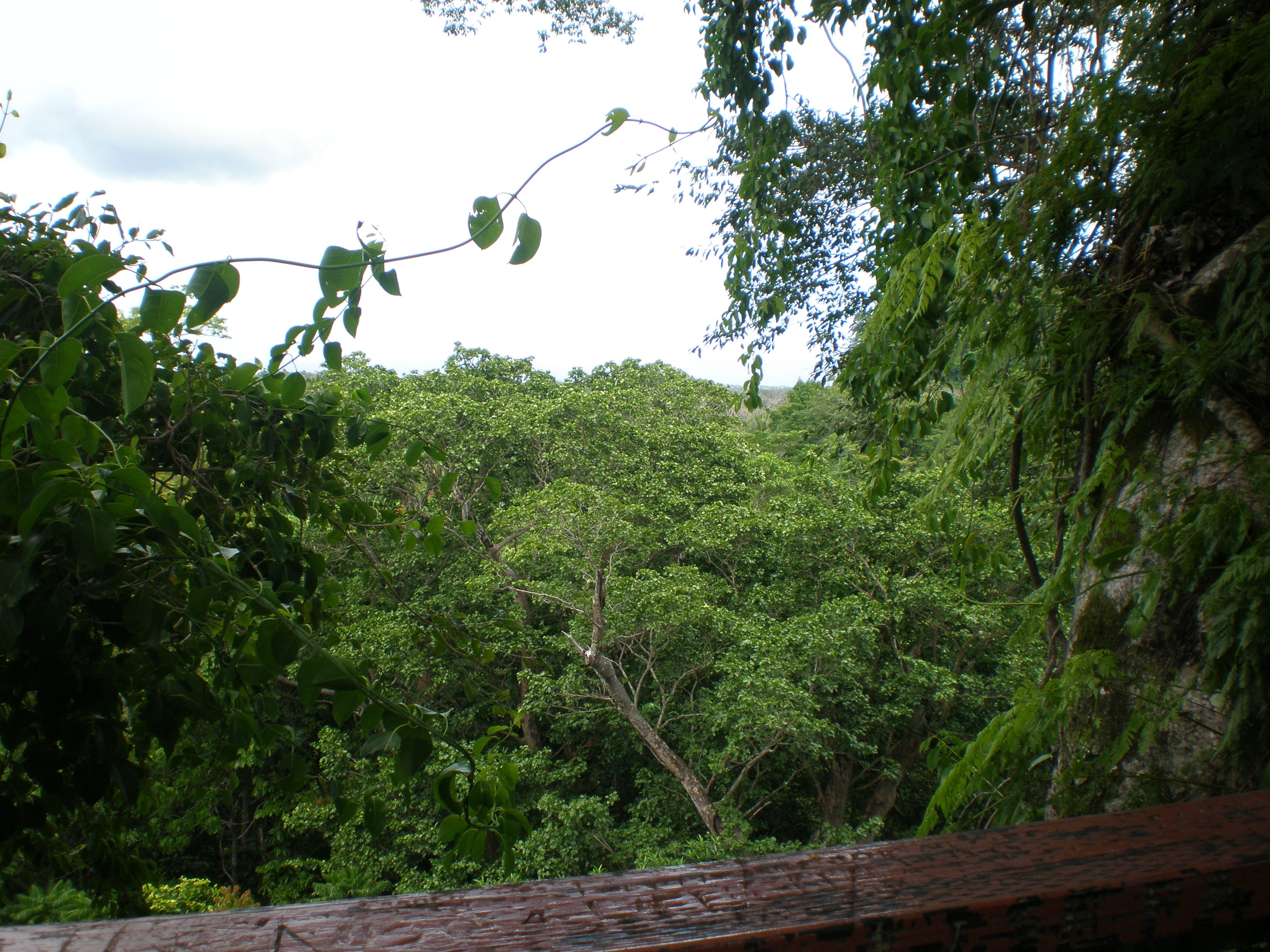
View across the top of low-lying rainforest in Falealupo.

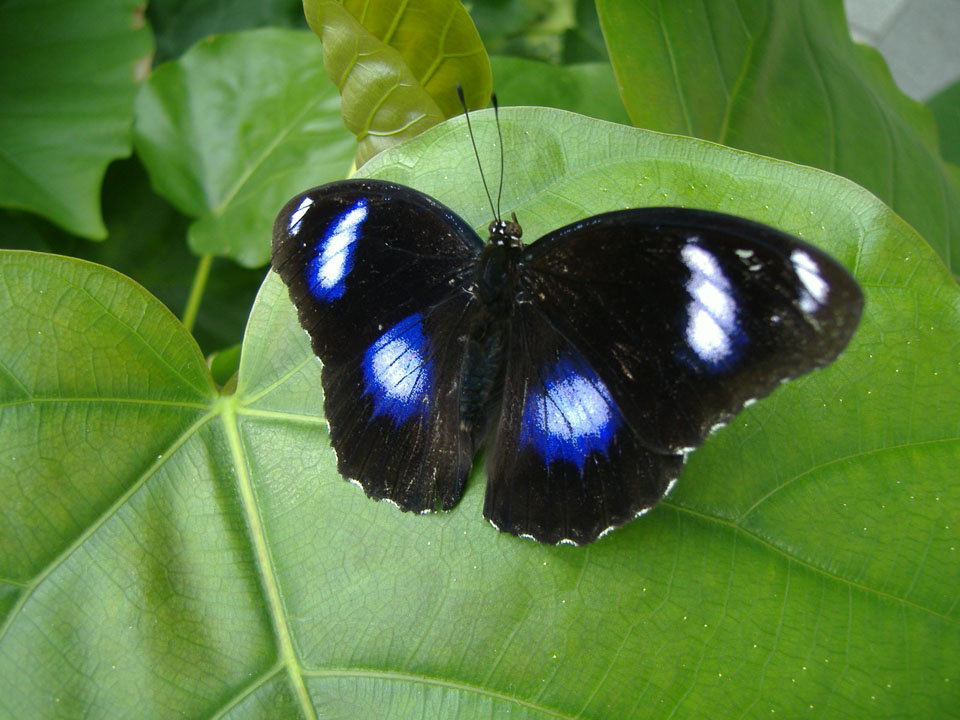
Hypolimnas bolina butterfly.

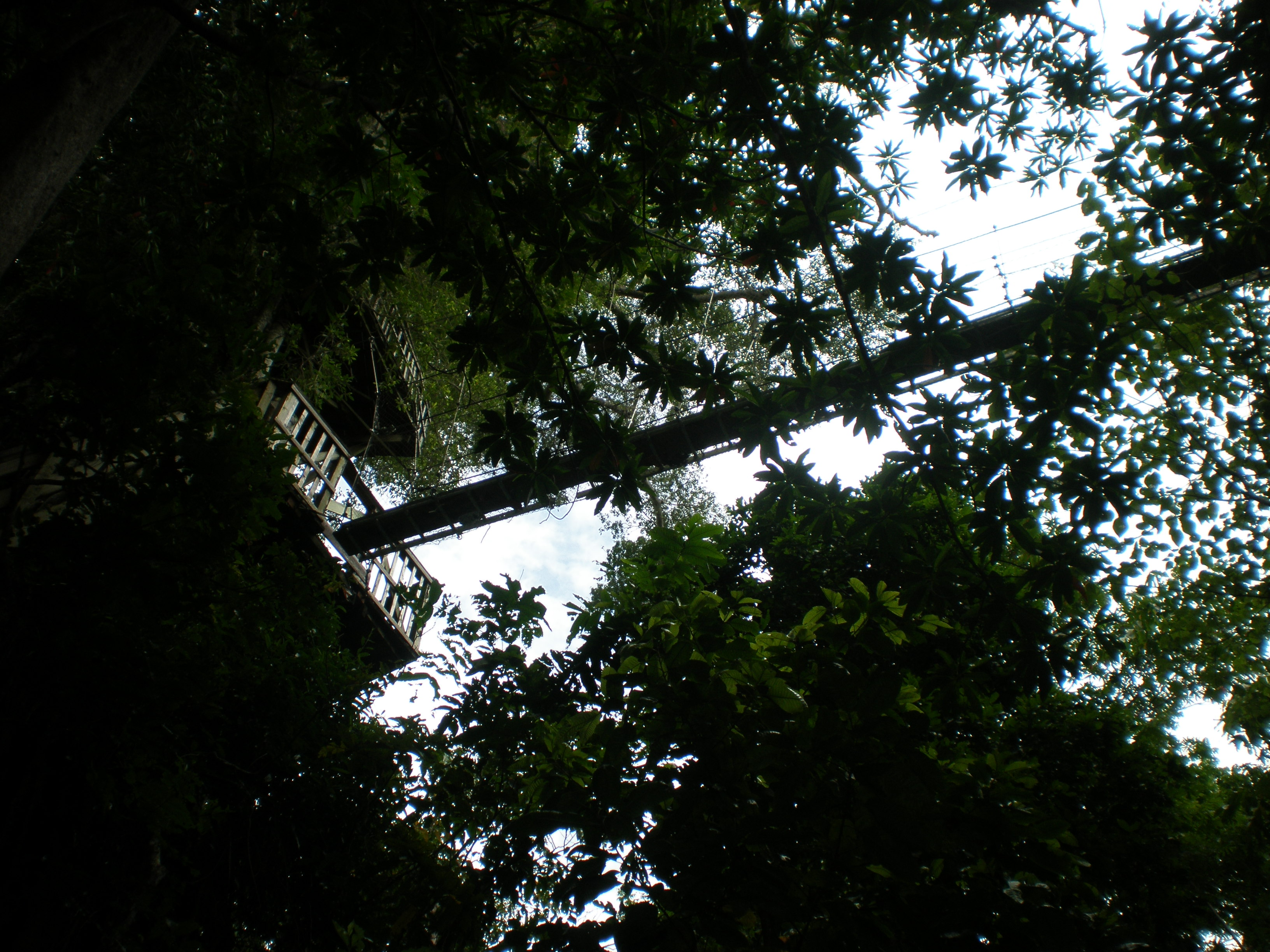
Forest canopy in Falealupo.

== See also ==
- List of ecoregions in the United States (WWF)
- Flora of Samoa
