= Abutilon whistleri =

Conservation status
- Critically Endangered (IUCN 3.1)

Scientific classification
- Kingdom: Plantae
- Clade: Tracheophytes
- Clade: Angiosperms
- Clade: Eudicots
- Clade: Rosids
- Order: Malvales
- Family: Malvaceae
- Genus: Abutilon
- Species: A. whistleri

Binomial name
- Abutilon whistleri Fosberg

Species of flowering plant

Abutilon whistleri is a species of flowering plant in the Mallow family. It is endemic to the island nation of Samoa, specifically on the island of Savaiʻi. It is critically endangered due to invasive plants, pests, and flooding.

== Characteristics ==
The plant can grow up to 18 m (59 ft) tall and it produces small subglobose capsule fruits that are around 1.2–1.5 cm (0.47–0.59 in) wide. The leaves are heart-shaped and its flowers are white.
