= Spiraeanthemum samoense =

Scientific classification
- Kingdom: Plantae
- Clade: Tracheophytes
- Clade: Angiosperms
- Clade: Eudicots
- Clade: Rosids
- Order: Oxalidales
- Family: Cunoniaceae
- Genus: Spiraeanthemum
- Species: S. samoense

Binomial name
- Spiraeanthemum samoense A.Gray.

Synonyms
- Spiraeanthemum samoense var. lanutooi Rech.

Species of flowering plant

Spiraeanthemum samoense is a species of flowering plant belong to the family of Cunoniaceae. It is the only species of the family that is endemic to Samoa, an island in the Pacific Ocean. it grows up to 8 m (26 ft) tall. The plant is harvested for its wood, which is used locally. It is used to make canoes and clubs.

== See also ==
- Samoan tropical moist forests
- List of endemic plants of Samoa
