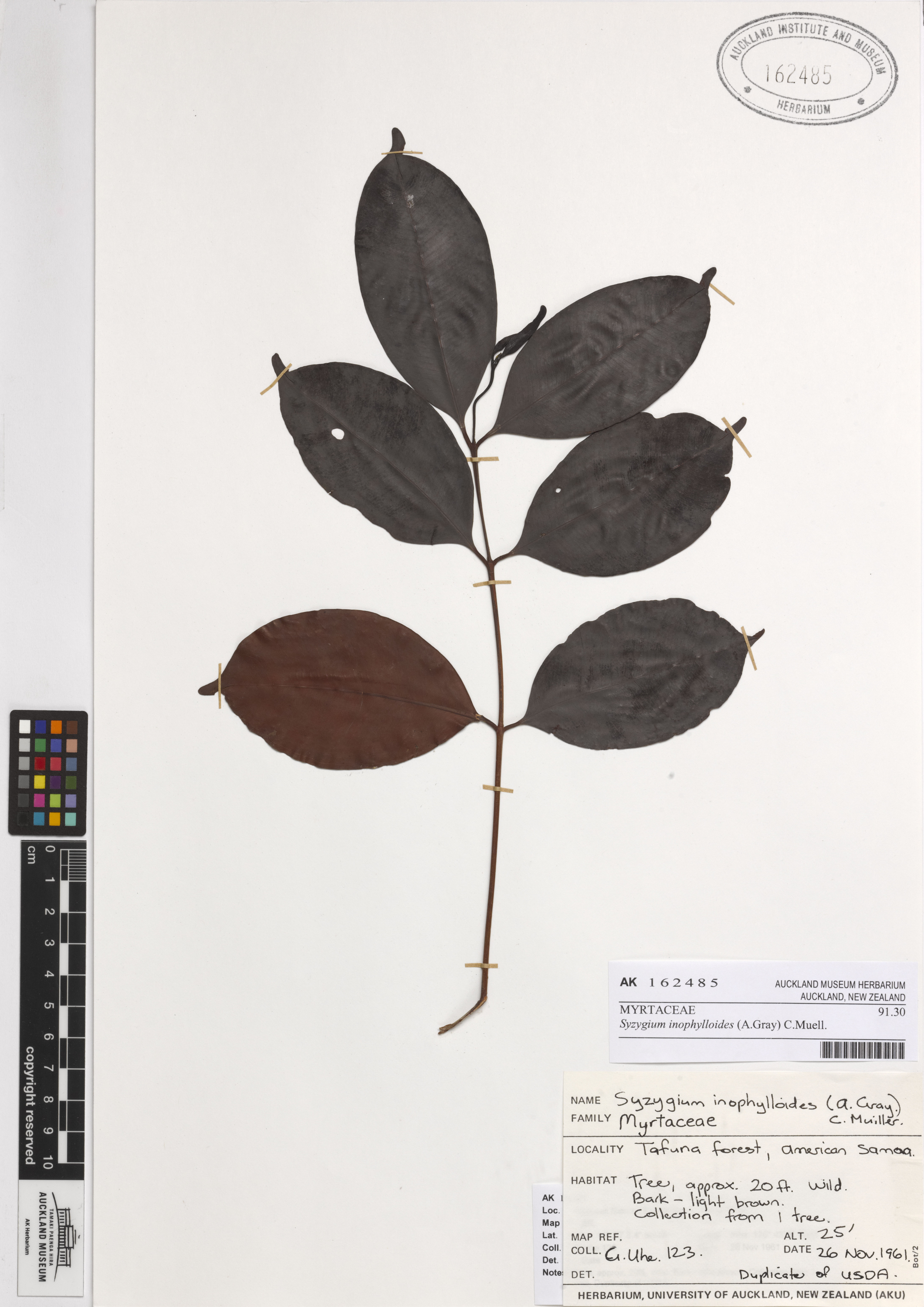

Conservation status
- Least Concern (IUCN 3.1)

Scientific classification
- Kingdom: Plantae
- Clade: Tracheophytes
- Clade: Angiosperms
- Clade: Eudicots
- Clade: Rosids
- Order: Myrtales
- Family: Myrtaceae
- Genus: Syzygium
- Species: S. inophylloides

Binomial name
- Syzygium inophylloides (A.Gray) Müll.Berol. (1858)

Synonyms
- Eugenia inophylloides A.Gray (1854); Eugenia crosbyi Burkill (1901)

= Syzygium inophylloides =

Species of flowering plant

Syzygium inophylloides is a species of flowering plant in the myrtle family, Myrtaceae. It is a tree native to Niue, the Samoan Islands, Tonga, and Wallis and Futuna. It grows in lowland tropical moist forests.
