= Carex samoensis =

Scientific classification
- Kingdom: Plantae
- Clade: Embryophytes
- Clade: Tracheophytes
- Clade: Spermatophytes
- Clade: Angiosperms
- Clade: Monocots
- Clade: Commelinids
- Order: Poales
- Family: Cyperaceae
- Genus: Carex
- Species: C. samoensis

Binomial name
- Carex samoensis Boeckeler

Synonyms
- Carex savaiiensis Kük.

Species of sedge

Carex samoensis is a tussock-forming perennial in the family Cyperaceae. It is endemic to the island country of Samoa.

== See also ==
- List of Carex species
