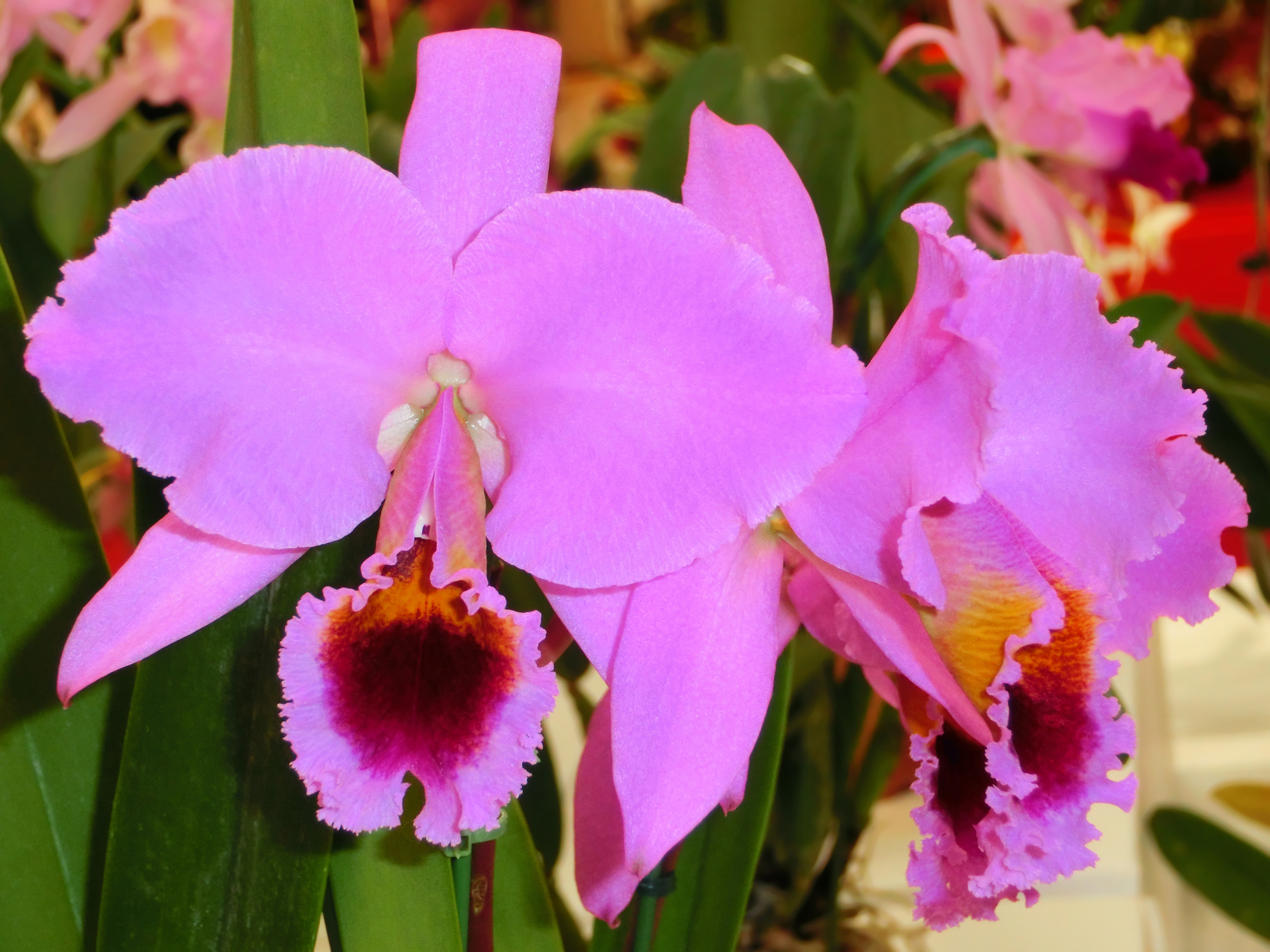

Scientific classification
- Kingdom: Plantae
- Clade: Tracheophytes
- Clade: Angiosperms
- Clade: Monocots
- Order: Asparagales
- Family: Orchidaceae
- Subfamily: Epidendroideae
- Genus: Cattleya
- Subgenus: Cattleya subg. Cattleya
- Section: Cattleya sect. Cattleya
- Species: C. percivaliana

Binomial name
- Cattleya percivaliana (Rchb.f.) O'Brien

Synonyms
- Cattleya labiata var. percivaliana Rchb.f.

= Cattleya percivaliana =

Species of orchid

Cattleya percivaliana is a species of orchid. It shares the common name of "Christmas orchid" with C. trianae and Angraecum sesquipedale. The diploid chromosome number of C. percivaliana has been determined to be 2n = 40. The haploid chromosome number has been determined to be n = 20.
