= Carex graeffeana =

Scientific classification
- Kingdom: Plantae
- Clade: Tracheophytes
- Clade: Angiosperms
- Clade: Monocots
- Clade: Commelinids
- Order: Poales
- Family: Cyperaceae
- Genus: Carex
- Species: C. graeffeana

Binomial name
- Carex graeffeana Boeckeler

Species of plant

Carex graeffeana is a tussock-forming species of perennial sedge in the family Cyperaceae. It is native to parts of Malesia and islands of the south western Pacific Ocean.

The species was first formally described by the botanist Johann Otto Boeckeler in 1875 as a part of the work Flora. It has six synonyms;

- Carex euphlebia S.T.Blake
- Carex exploratorum Nelmes
- Carex graeffeana var. samoensis Nelmes
- Carex pandanus Ohwi
- Carex philippinensis Nelmes
- Carex rechingeri Palla

== See also ==
- List of Carex species
