= Ixora amplifolia =

Scientific classification
- Kingdom: Plantae
- Clade: Tracheophytes
- Clade: Angiosperms
- Clade: Eudicots
- Clade: Asterids
- Order: Gentianales
- Family: Rubiaceae
- Genus: Ixora
- Species: I. amplifolia

Binomial name
- Ixora amplifolia A.Gray

Synonyms
- Ixora gigantea Rech.; Ixora indora Rech.; Ixora upolensis Rech.

Species of flowering plant

Ixora amplifolia is a species of plant in the family Rubiaceae. It is endemic to Samoa.
