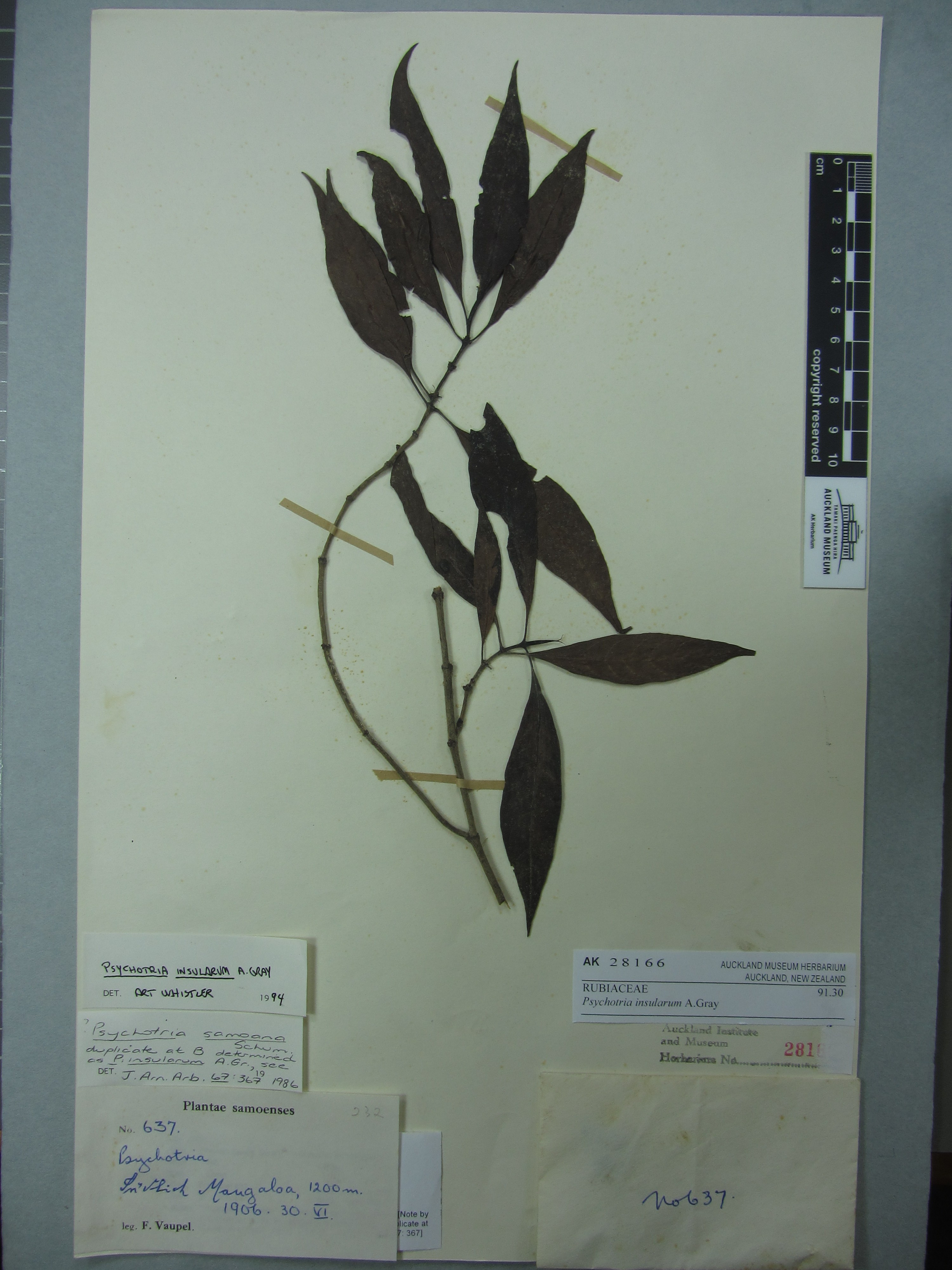

Scientific classification
- Kingdom: Plantae
- Clade: Tracheophytes
- Clade: Angiosperms
- Clade: Eudicots
- Clade: Asterids
- Order: Gentianales
- Family: Rubiaceae
- Genus: Psychotria
- Species: P. insularum

Binomial name
- Psychotria insularum Gray

= Psychotria insularum =

Species of plant

Psychotria insularum is a rainforest understory shrub from the coffee family, Rubiaceae. Its native range is the South Pacific.

It has traditional uses in herbal medicine. In 2021, the potent anti-inflammatory rutin was isolated from P. insularum (known in Samoa as "matalafi").
