= Coprosma strigulosa =

- Herbarium specimens

Scientific classification
- Kingdom: Plantae
- Clade: Tracheophytes
- Clade: Angiosperms
- Clade: Eudicots
- Clade: Asterids
- Order: Gentianales
- Family: Rubiaceae
- Genus: Coprosma
- Species: C. strigulosa

Binomial name
- Coprosma strigulosa Lauterb.

Species of flowering plant

Coprosma strigulosa is a species of shrub belonging to the Rubiaceae family. It is endemic to Samoa. it is found on the highest elevation of lava flows.

== Description ==
Coprosma strigulosa is a plant species distinguished by its narrow, membranous leaves featuring appressed pale bristles along the midrib, margins, and veins, particularly on the lower surface near the domatia. Unlike the closely related Coprosma savaiensis, its stipule is broader, lacks a keel, and possesses bristles along the margin, especially around the base of the apical colleter. The species produces subglobose, somewhat two-lobed fruits, structurally similar to those of the Norfolk Island. Reflecting the morphology of both C. pilosa and New Zealand's didymous-fruited species, the pyrenes of C. strigulosa are characterized by a deep central invagination, or notch, situated directly above the operculum.

== See also ==
- Samoan tropical moist forests
