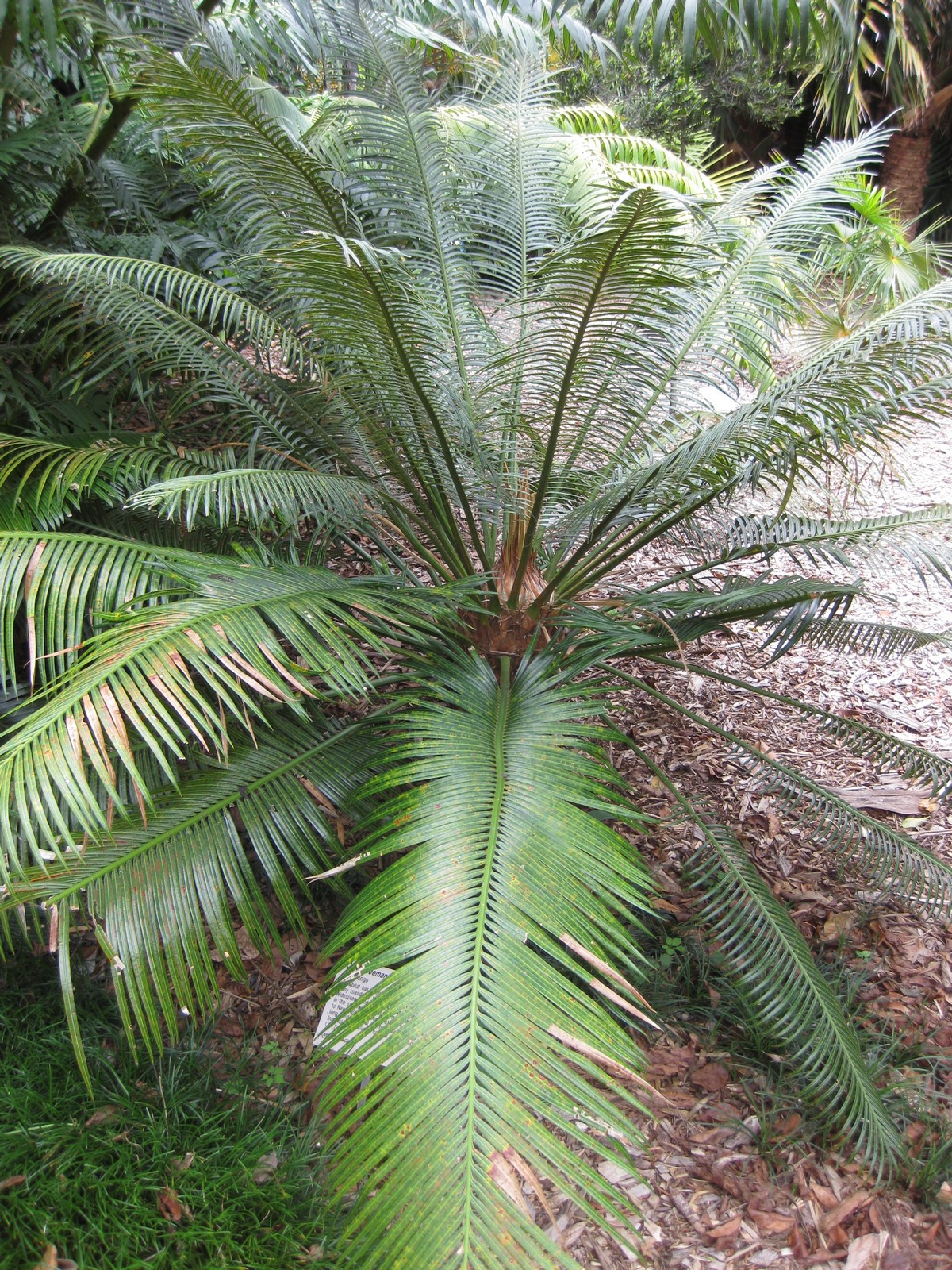

Conservation status
- Vulnerable (IUCN 3.1)

Scientific classification
- Kingdom: Plantae
- Clade: Tracheophytes
- Clade: Gymnosperms
- Division: Cycadophyta
- Class: Cycadopsida
- Order: Cycadales
- Family: Cycadaceae
- Genus: Cycas
- Species: C. seemannii

Binomial name
- Cycas seemannii A.Braun

Synonyms
- Cycas neocaledonica Daveau

= Cycas seemannii =

Species of plant

Cycas seemannii is a species of cycad found in Fiji, Vanuatu (in Efate), Tonga, New Caledonia, Samoa, and the Gilbert Islands.

In Vanuatu, the cycad is known as namele and is an important symbol of traditional culture. It serves as a powerful taboo sign, and a pair of namele leaves appears on the national flag and coat of arms. Together with the nanggaria plant, another symbol of Vanuatu culture, the namele gives its name to Nagriamel, an indigenous political movement.
