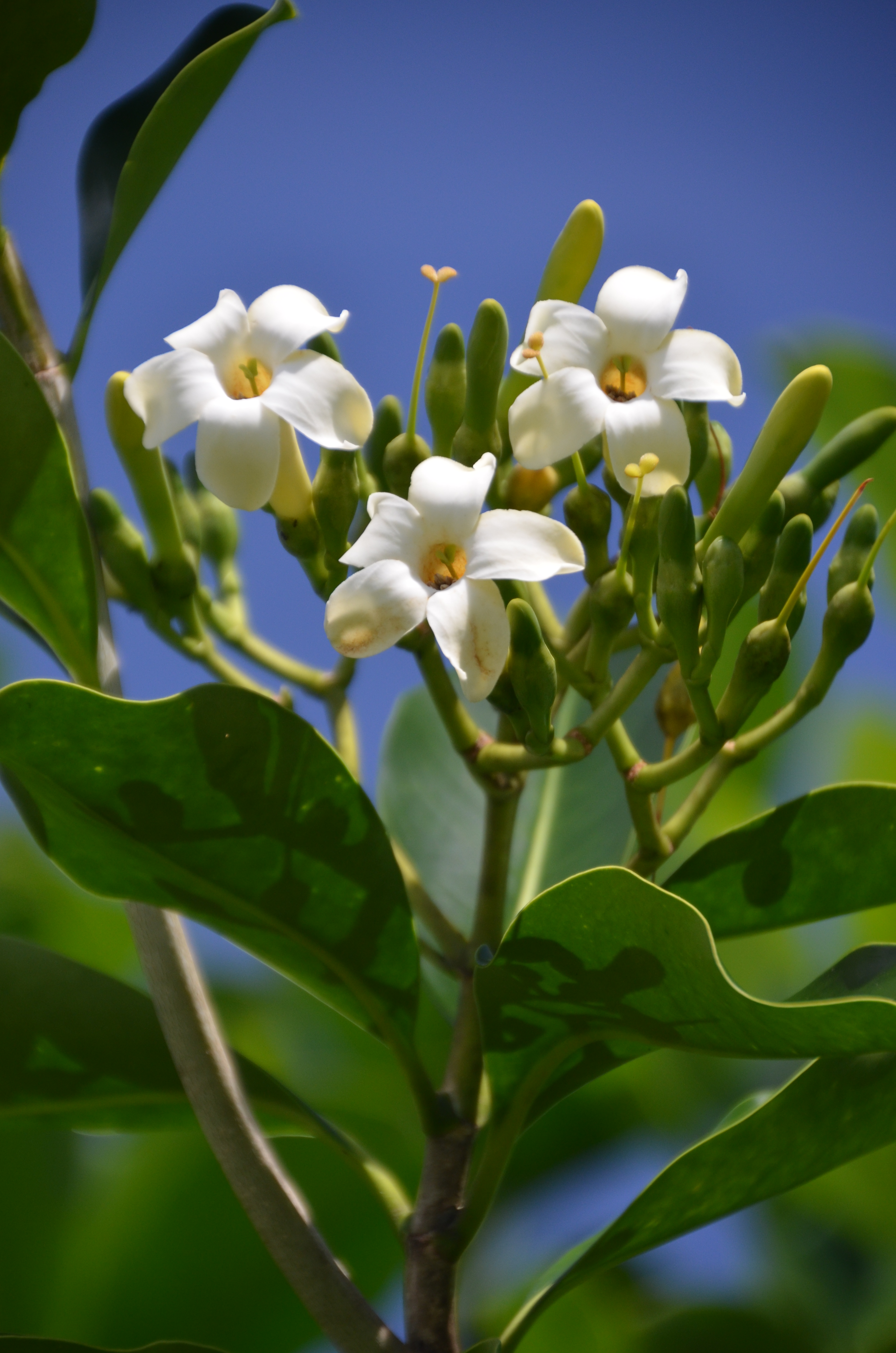

Conservation status
- Least Concern (IUCN 3.1)

Scientific classification
- Kingdom: Plantae
- Clade: Embryophytes
- Clade: Tracheophytes
- Clade: Spermatophytes
- Clade: Angiosperms
- Clade: Eudicots
- Clade: Asterids
- Order: Gentianales
- Family: Gentianaceae
- Genus: Fagraea
- Species: F. berteroana

Binomial name
- Fagraea berteroana A.Gray ex Benth.

Synonyms
- 28 synonyms: Carissa grandis Bertero ex A.DC.; Fagraea affinis S.Moore; Fagraea berteroana var. galilai (Gilg & Gilg-Ben.) Fosberg; Fagraea berteroana var. kusaiana (Hosok.) Fosberg; Fagraea berteroana var. ladronica Fosberg; Fagraea berteroana var. marquisensis Fosberg & Sachet; Fagraea berteroana var. pogas (Hosok.) Fosberg; Fagraea berteroana var. sair (Gilg & Gilg-Ben.) Fosberg; Fagraea calophylloides Gilg & Gilg-Ben.; Fagraea galilai Gilg & Gilg-Ben.; Fagraea grandis Pancher & Sebert; Fagraea ksid Gilg & Gilg-Ben.; Fagraea kusaiana Hosok.; Fagraea longituba M.L.Grant; Fagraea novae-guineae Cammerl.; Fagraea obovata var. papuana F.M.Bailey; Fagraea pachypoda Gilg & Gilg-Ben.; Fagraea peekelii Gilg & Gilg-Ben.; Fagraea pluvialis S.Moore; Fagraea pua Nadeaud; Fagraea rosenstromii C.T.White; Fagraea sair Gilg & Gilg-Ben.; Fagraea sair var. pogas Hosok.; Fagraea salomonensis Gilg & Gilg-Ben.; Fagraea samoensis Gilg & Gilg-Ben.; Fagraea schlechteri Gilg & Gilg-Ben.; Fagraea tahitensis Butteaud; Fagraea vitiensis Gilg & Gilg-Ben.

= Fagraea berteroana =

Species of plant

Fagraea berteroana (orth. variant F. berteriana), commonly known as the pua keni keni, pua kenikeni or perfume flower tree, is a small spreading tree or a large shrub. It is known as the pua-lulu in the Samoan Islands, and as pua in Tonga, Niue and Tahiti.

It is native to the tropical Pacific, ranging from Queensland, Australia, and Papuasia (New Guinea, the Bismarck Archipelago, and Solomon Islands) to Micronesia (Caroline Islands, Gilbert Islands, and Marianas), Vanuatu, New Caledonia, Fiji, and parts of Polynesia (Cook Islands, Marquesas, Nauru, Niue, Samoan Islands, Society Islands, Tonga, Tubuai Islands, and Wallis and Futuna).

== Description ==
The plant has quad-angular branches, blunt tipped leaves, and fragrant 7 centimetres (2.8 in) tubular shaped flowers of creamy white, which become yellow with time.

== Etymology ==
The ITIS database clarifies the origin and spelling of the species epithet berteroana — "Published as 'berteriana' in honor of Bertero; correctable to 'berteroana,'".

== Cultural use ==
It was introduced to Hawaii, where the flowers are popular for making lei. The tree's name, in Hawaiian, means "ten cent flower", referring to the sale price for a single flower in the past.

== Gallery ==
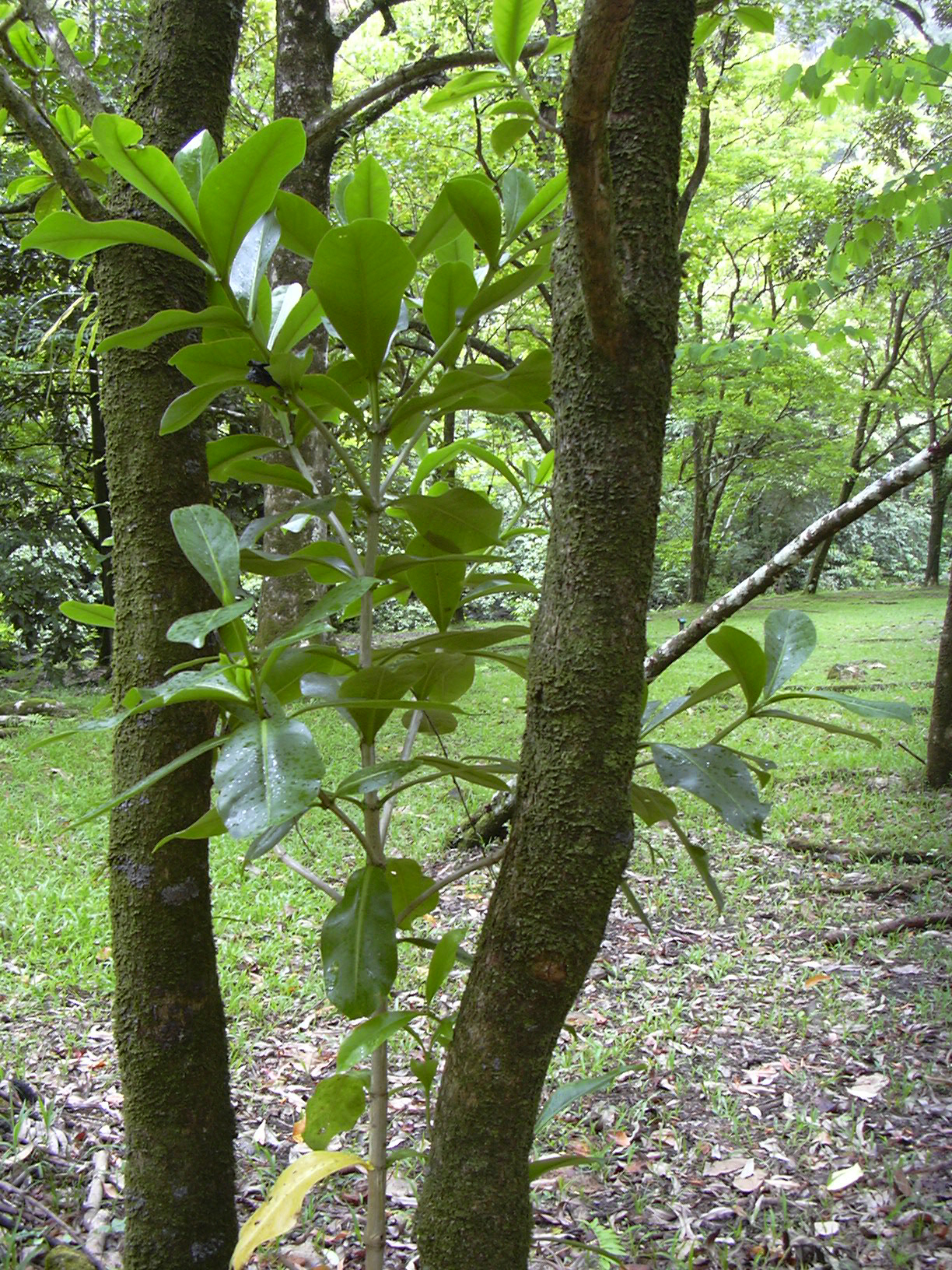
Stem and leaves

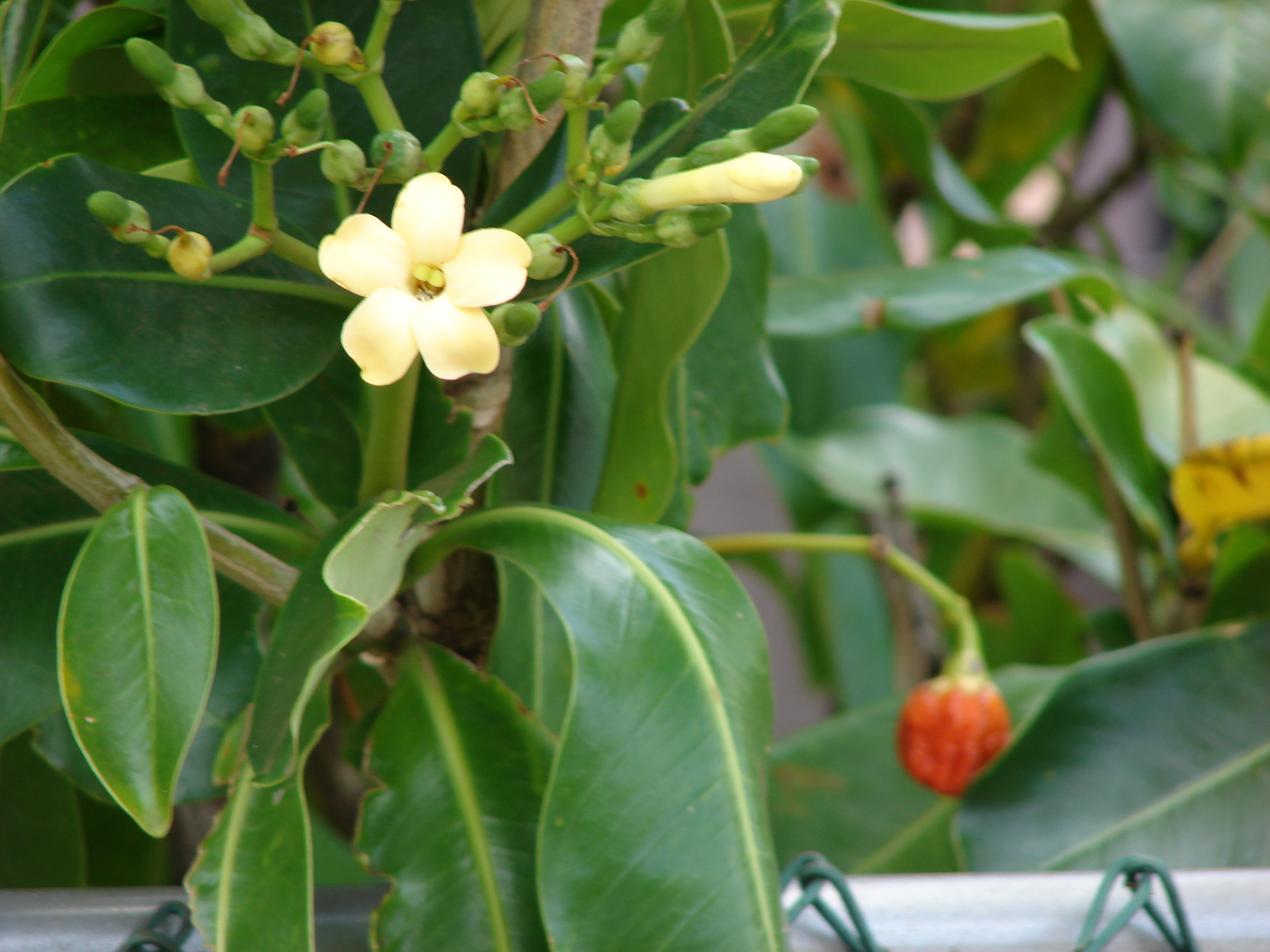
Flower, fruit and leaves

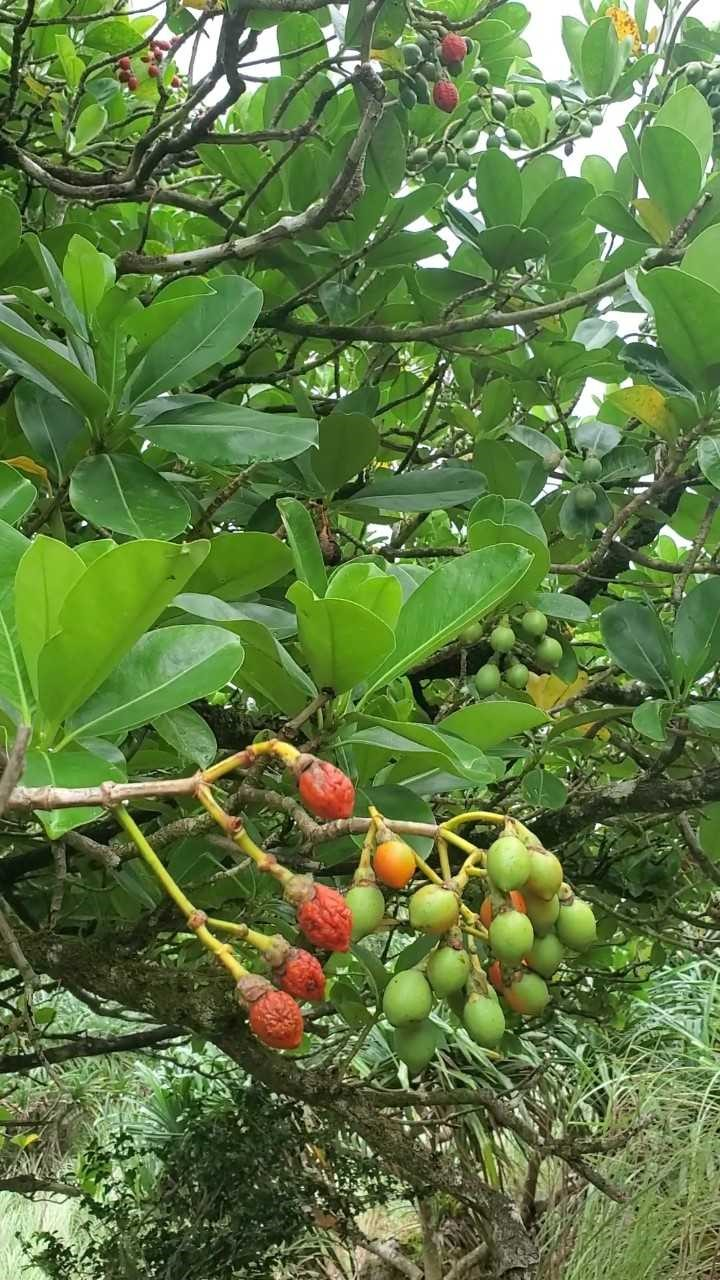
Ripe and unripe fruits

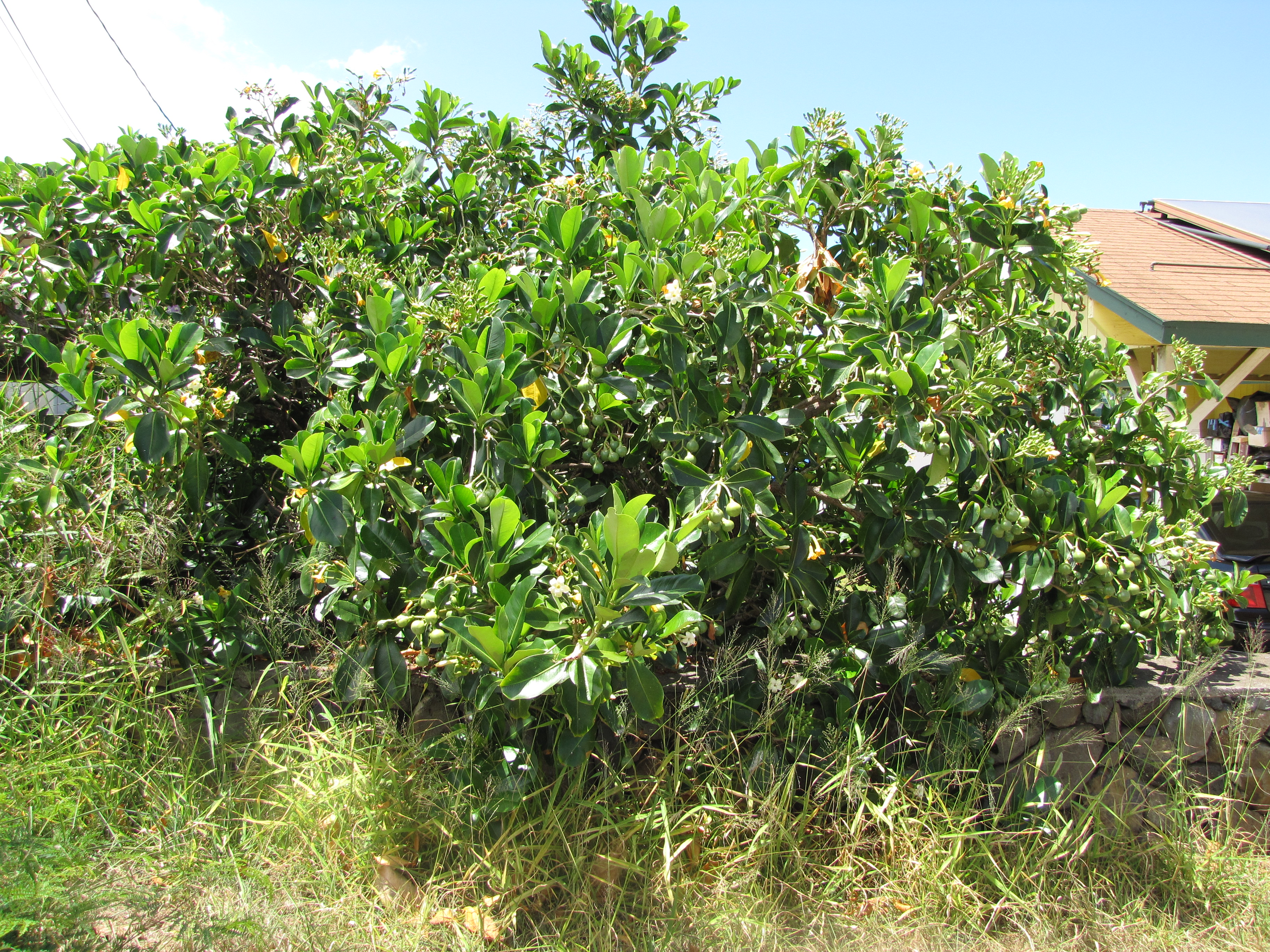
Crown

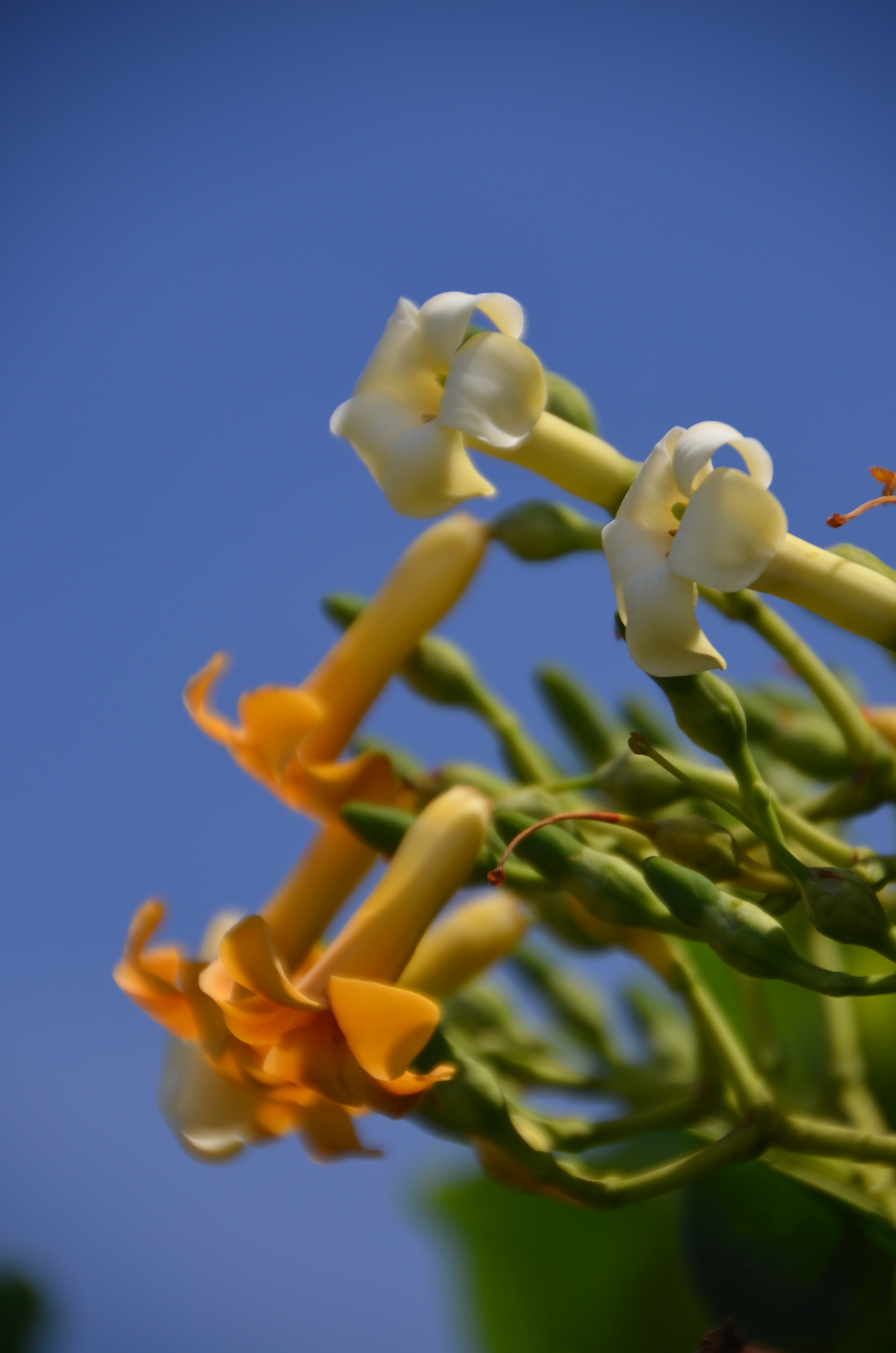
White and orange flowers
