= Planchonella torricellensis =

Conservation status
- Least Concern (IUCN 3.1)

Scientific classification
- Kingdom: Plantae
- Clade: Tracheophytes
- Clade: Angiosperms
- Clade: Eudicots
- Clade: Asterids
- Order: Ericales
- Family: Sapotaceae
- Genus: Planchonella
- Species: P. torricellensis

Binomial name
- Planchonella torricellensis (K.Schum.) H.J.Lam (1932)

Synonyms
- Planchonella paludosa H.J.Lam (1927); Planchonella samoensis H.J.Lam (1938); Pouteria torricellensis (K.Schum.) Baehni (1942); Rapanea torricellensis K.Schum. (1905); Sideroxylon acuminatum Elmer (1912); Sideroxylon acutum K.Krause (1923)

Species of tree

Planchonella torricellensis is a tree in the family Sapotaceae. It is native to Maluku, the Lesser Sunda Islands, New Guinea, Fiji, Niue, the Samoan Islands, Tonga, the Tuamotus, and Wallis and Futuna.

It is a large tree, growing up to 40 meters tall. It is a canopy tree in lowland moist forest.
