= List of endemic plants of Samoa =

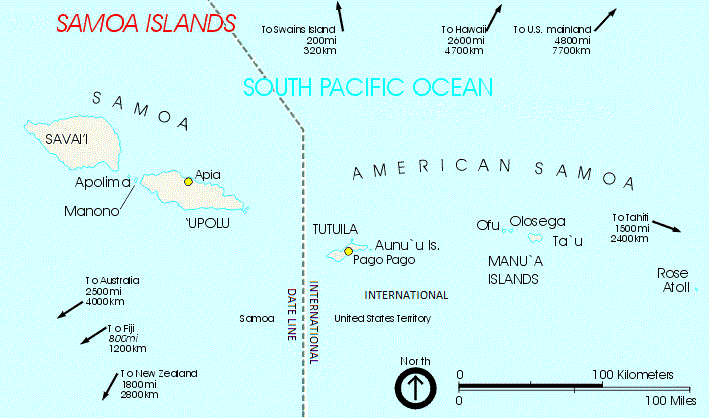
Map of the Botanical country of Samoa, which includes both Samoa and American Samoa.

the botanical country of Samoa has islands of Savai'i, Upolu, Tutuila, and many smaller islands. is home to over 180 endemic species, making it one of the places with the highest biodiversity of floras in Polynesia after Hawaii Politically, American Samoa is an unincorporated territory of the United States, but the World Geographical Scheme for Recording Plant Distributions classifies it alongside Samoa as a single botanical country.

== Acanthaceae ==
- Dicliptera samoensis Seem (1866)

== Anacardiaceae ==
- Buchanania merrillii Christoph.

== Annonaceae ==
- Huberantha whistleri I.M Turner. & Utteridge
- Polyalthia sp. nova

== Apocynaceae ==
- Hoya artwhistleri Kloppenb.
- Alyxia samoensis (Christoph.) A.C.Sm
- Hoya betchei Schltr.
- Hoya corollimarginata Kloppenb.
- Hoya spencii Kloppenb.
- Hoya faoensis Kloppenb.
- Hoya filiformis Rech.
- Hoya fetuana Rech.
- Hoya fetuana subsp. fetuana
- Hoya fetuana subsp. sigaeleensis
- Hoya fetuana subsp. tutuilensis
- Hoya malata Kloppenb.
- Hoya fitoensis Kloppenb.
- Hoya nuuuliensis Kloppenb. & Siar
- Hoya ofuensis Kloppenb.
- Hoya mata-ole-afiensis Kloppenb.
- Hoya patameaensis Kloppenb.-Savai'i
- Hoya savaiiensis Kloppenb.
- Hoya matavanuensis Kloppenb.
- Hoya nuuuliensis Kloppenb.
- Hoya ofuensis Kloppenb.
- Hoya seanwhistleriana Kloppenb.
- Hoya tamaleaaea Kloppenb.
- Hoya uafatoensis Kloppenb.
- Hoya whistleri Kloppenb.
- Hoya olosegansis Kloppenb.
- Hoya crassior Kloppenb.
- Physostelma betchei Schltr.
- Hoya samoa-albiflora Kloppenb.
- Hoya savaiiensis subsp. falealupoensis Kloppenb.
- Hoya tamaleaaeaKloppenb.
- Hoya tauensis
- Hoya tiatuilaensis Kloppenb.
- Hoya × tuafanua

== Araliaceae ==
- Meryta malietoa P.A.Cox
- Polyscias pleiosperma (A.Gray.) Lowry & Plunkett.
- Polyscias lanutoensis (A.Gray.) Lowry & Plunkett
- Polyscias reineckei Harms.
- Schefflera samoensis (A.Gray.) Harms.

== Arecaceae ==
- Balaka insularis Zona & W.J.Baker.
- Balaka samoensis
- Balaka siliensis
- Balaka tahitensis
- Clinostigma samoense H.Wendl.
- Clinostigma warburgii Becc.
- Clinostigma savaiiense Christoph.
- Drymophloeus whitmeeanus Becc.

== Aspleniaceae ==
- Athyrium oosorum W.J.Baker. Christ
- Asplenium pacificum Holttum
- Hymenasplenium oligosorum Li Bing Zhang
- Hymenasplenium samoaense Li Bing Zhang

== Asteliaceae ==
- Astelia samoense (Skottsb.) Birch

== Aristolochiaceae ==
- Aristolochia cortinata Reinecke

== Calophyllaceae ==
- Mammea glauca (Merr) Kosterm

== Cunoniaceae ==
- Spiraeanthemum samoense A.Gray.

== Cyperacecae ==
- Carex samoensis Boeckeler
- Cyperus whitmeei(C.B.Clarke) Kük.

== Cyatheaceae ==
- Alsophila pacifica Christenh.
- Cyathea scabra Baker.J
- Cyathea setchellii Copel.

== Dennstaedtiaceae ==
- Dennstaedtia nudisora (C.Chr.) ined.
- Hypolepis aspidioides Christ

== Elaeocarpaceae ==
- Elaeocarpus magnifolius Christoph.
- Elaeocarpus tuasivicus Christoph.

== Ericaceae ==
- Vaccinium whitmeei F.Muell

== Euphorbiaceae ==
- Claoxylon montanum whistler
- Claoxylon samoense Pax & K.Hoffm
- Homalanthus acuminatus (Mull.Arg.) Pax
- Macaranga grayana (Mull.Arg.)
- Macaranga monostyla Whistler
- Macaranga savaiiensis whistler
- Macaranga stipulosa (Mull.Arg.)
- Tanarius grayanus (Mull.Arg.)
- Tanarius stipulosus (Mull.Arg.)

== Fabaceae ==
- Serianthes melanesica var. samoensis Fosberg
- Strongylodon rubriflorus Whistler

== Gesneriaceae ==
- Cyrtandra campanulata Reinecke
- Cyrtandra angustivenosa Rech
- Cyrtandra aurantiicarpa G.W.Gillett
- Cyrtandra compressa C.B.Clarke
- Cyrtandra falcifolia C.B.Clarke
- Cyrtandra funkii Reinecke
- Cyrtandra geminata Reinecke
- Cyrtandra graeffei Reinecke
- Cyrtandra guerkeana Lauterb.
- Cyrtandra kruegeri Reinecke
- Cyrtandra longipedunculata Rech.
- Cyrtandra mamolea Reinecke
- Cyrtandra nitens C.B Clarke
- Cyrtandra nudiflora C.B Clarke
- Cyrtandra pogonantha A.Gray
- Cyrtandra pulchella O.Rich ex A.Gray
- Cyrtandra richii A. Gray.

== Goodeniaceae ==
- Scaevola samoensis whistler
- Scaevola nubigena Lauterb.

== Heliconiaceae ==
- Heliconia laufao W.J.Kress

== Hymenophyllaceae ==
- Hymenophyllum praetervisum Christ
- Trichomanes samoense (Copel.) C.Chr.,

== Lycopodiaceae ==
- Huperzia samoana (Herter ex Nessel) Holub

== Lauracecae ==
- Cinnamomum elegans Reinecke
- Cryptocarya samoensis Christoph.
- Cryptocarya wilderiana Christoph.
- Litsea samoensis Christoph.

== Malvaceae ==
- Abutilon whistleri Fosberg

== Melastomatacecae ==
- Astronidium lemafaense J.F Maxwell
- Astronidium navigatorum Christoph
- Astronidium pickeringii ((A. Gray.)) Christoph.
- Astronidium samoense (S.Moore) Markgr
- Astronidium subcordatum A. Gray.
- Medinilla samoensis (Hochr.) Christoph.

== Moraceae ==
- Ficus hygrophila Rech.
- Ficus samoensis summerh.
- Ficus uniauriculata Warb.

== Myrtaceae ==
- Metrosideros gregoryi Christoph.
- Syzygium brevifolium A. Gray
- Syzygium christophersenii Whistler.
- Syzygium graeffei Whistler
- Syzygium hebephyllum Mellvile
- Syzygium oligadelphum (Christoph.) Merr & L.M. Perry.
- Syzygium patentinerve Christoph.
- Syzygium reineckei Whistler
- Syzygium savaiiense A.Gray.
- Syzygium subimbricatum Whistler
- Syzygium vaupelii Whistler

== Nyctaginaceae ==
- Ceodes merytifolia (Whistler) E.F.S.Rossetto & Caraballo

== Orchidaceae ==
- Corybas betchei (F.Muell) Schltr.
- Dendrobium fililobum F.Muell.
- Dendrobium lepidochilum Kraenzl
- Dendrobium samoense P.J.Cribb.
- Dendrobium scirpoides Schltr.
- Habenaria samoensis F.Muell. & Kraenzl
- Liparis phyllocardia Schltr
- Nervilia grandiflora Schltr
- Peristylus cryptostylus (Rchb.) Omrerod
- Platylepis heteromorpha Rchb.f.
- Taeniophyllum savaiiense P.J.Cribb. & Whistler
- Taeniophyllum whistleri P.J.Cribb.
- Zeuxine plantaginea Rchb.f

== Pandanaceae ==
- Pandanus reineckei warb.
- Pandanus turritus Martelli

== Pentaphylacaceae ==
- Eurya fosbergii Whistler.
- Eurya pickeringii A.Gray.

== Phyllanthaceae ==
- Baccaurea taitensis Mull.Arg.
- Phyllanthus christophersenii Croizat) W.L.Wagner & Lorence
- Phyllanthus cuspidatus Mull.Arg.

== Piperaceae ==
- Peperomia samoensis Warb.
- Peperomia savaiiensis whistler
- Piper rechingeri C.DC.

== Pitosporaceae ==
- Pittosporum samoense Christoph.

== Polypodiaceae ==
- Ctenitis samoensis (C.Chr.) Holttum
- Grammitis christophersenii Copel.
- Grammitis deltoideophylla (Baker) Christenh.
- Grammitis insularis Copel.
- Grammitis lepida (Brause) Christenh.
- Grammitis monticola Sledge
- Grammitis samoensis (Baker) Ching,
- Grammitis thalia Christenh.
- Grammitis whitmeei (Baker) Copel.

== Primulaceae ==
- Myrsine longipes (A.C.Sm.) Ricketson & Pipoly

== Pteridaceae ==
- Pteris vaupelii Hieron

== Rubiaceae ==
- Calycosia sessilis A.Gray.
- Coprosma savaiiensis Rech.
- Coprosma strigulosa Lauterb.
- Eumachia chlorocalyx (K.Schum.) Barrabé
- Eumachia geminodens (K.Schum.) Barrabé
- Eumachia geminodens (K.Schum.) Barrabé
- Eumachia samoana (K.Schum.) Barrabé
- Eumachia savaiiensis (Rech.) Barrabé
- Eumachia sclerocarpa (Whistler) Barrabé.
- Eumachia vaupelii (Whistler) Barrabé
- Gardenia lanutoo Reinecke
- Ixora amplifolia A.Gray.
- Morinda pacifica (Reinecke) Razafim.
- Morinda ramosa (Lauterb.) Razafim.
- Psychotria apodantha A.Gray.
- Psychotria bristolii Whistler.
- Psychotria christophersenii Whistler
- Psychotria closterocarpa A.Gray
- Psychotria garberiana Christoph
- Psychotria gigantopus K.Schum.
- Psychotria grandistipulata (Lauterb.) Whistler
- Psychotria juddii Christoph.
- Psychotria pacifica K.Schum.
- Psychotria reineckei K.Schum.
- Psychotria xanthochlora K.Schum.
- Timonius affinis var. samoensis S.P.Darwin

== Rutaceae ==
- Melicope albiflora Rech.
- Melicope lauterbachii Rech.
- Melicope richii (A.Gray) T.G.Hartley
- Melicope savaiensis T.G.Hartley
- Melicope sulcata T.G.Hartley
- Melicope vatiana (Setch.) T.G.Hartley

== Saccolomataceae ==
- Saccoloma samoense (Hovenkamp & T.T.Luong) Christenh.

== Salicaceae ==
- Casearia samoensis Whistler

== Sapindaceae ==
- Lepidocupania samoensis (Christoph.) Buerki

== Sapotaceae ==
- Manilkara samoensis H.J.Lam & B.Meeuse
- Palaquium stehlinii Christoph.

== Selaginellaceae ==
- Selaginella christii Hieron
- Selaginella hochreutineri Hieron
- Selaginella reineckei Hieron

== Stemonuraceae ==
- Medusanthera samoensis (Reinecke) R.A.Howard

== Urticaceae ==
- Cypholophus stipulatus Hochr
- Elatostema basiandrum Reinecke
- Elatostema cupreoviride Rech
- Elatostema glanduliferum Whistler
- Elatostema graeffei Reinecke
- Elatostema grandifolium Reinecke
- Elatostema kraemeri Reinecke
- Elatostema obliquifolium Reinecke
- Elatostema paxii Reinecke
- Elatostema rechingeri Whistler
- Elatostema samoense Reinecke
- Elatostema savaiiense Whistler
- Elatostema strictum Reinecke
- Elatostema tutuilense Whistler
- Elatostema scabriusculum Setch.
- Pipturus polynesicus var. samoensis (Hochr.) Skottsb.

== Thelypteridaceae ==
- Thelypteris bryanii (c.chr.) Christenh.
- Thelypteris hochreutineri (c.chr.) Christenh.
- Thelypteris pycnosora (c.chr.) Christenh.
- Thelypteris reineckei (c.chr.) Christenh.
- Thelypteris subjuncta Baker
- Thelypteris vaupelii (c.chr.) Christenh.
- Thelypteris pubirachis var. pubirachis.

== Zingiberaceae ==
- Hellwigia samoensis (Reinecke) Senjaya & A.D.Poulsen

== See also ==
- Samoan tropical moist forests
- Samoa plant names
