= List of Taeniophyllum species =

The following is a list of Taeniophyllum species accepted by the Plants of the World Online at January 2025.

- Taeniophyllum acsmithii Kocyan & Schuit.
- Taeniophyllum acuminatum (Schltr.) Kocyan & Schuit.
- Taeniophyllum affine Schltr.
- Taeniophyllum aggregatum Schltr.
- Taeniophyllum alatum (Ridl.) Kocyan & Schuit.
- Taeniophyllum album Schltr.
- Taeniophyllum alwisii Lindl.
- Taeniophyllum amboinense J.J.Sm.
- Taeniophyllum amplebracteatum Kocyan & Schuit.
- Taeniophyllum andamanicum N.P.Balakr. & N.Bhargava
- Taeniophyllum annuliferum Carr
- Taeniophyllum antennatum Schuit. & de Vogel
- Taeniophyllum aphyllum (Makino) Makino
- Taeniophyllum apiculatum J.J.Sm.
- Taeniophyllum appendiculatum P.O'Byrne & Gokusing
- Taeniophyllum arachnites J.J.Sm.
- Taeniophyllum arunachalense A.N.Rao & J.Lal
- Taeniophyllum asperatum Schltr.
- Taeniophyllum aurantiacum J.J.Sm.
- Taeniophyllum aureum Schltr.
- Taeniophyllum bakhuizenii J.J.Sm.
- Taeniophyllum baumei B.Gray
- Taeniophyllum bicostulatum J.J.Sm.
- Taeniophyllum biloculare J.J.Sm.
- Taeniophyllum biocellatum J.J.Sm.
- Taeniophyllum borneense Schltr.)
- Taeniophyllum brachyceras (Schltr.) Kocyan & Schuit.
- Taeniophyllum brachypus Schltr.
- Taeniophyllum bracteatum L.O.Williams
- Taeniophyllum breviscapum J.J.Sm.
- Taeniophyllum brunnescens Schltr.
- Taeniophyllum bryoides (Schltr.) Kocyan & Schuit.
- Taeniophyllum calcaratum J.J.Sm.
- Taeniophyllum calyptrochilum J.J.Sm.
- Taeniophyllum calyptrogyne Ormerod
- Taeniophyllum campanulatum Carr
- Taeniophyllum canaliculatum J.J.Sm.
- Taeniophyllum capillare J.J.Sm.
- Taeniophyllum cardiophorum Schltr.
- Taeniophyllum carinatum (Schltr.) Kocyan & Schuit.
- Taeniophyllum carnosiflorum Schltr.
- Taeniophyllum celebicum Rolfe
- Taeniophyllum ceratostylis (Schltr.) Kocyan & Schuit.
- Taeniophyllum chaetophorum (Schltr.) Kocyan & Schuit.
- Taeniophyllum clavatum Schltr.
- Taeniophyllum clavicalcar J.J.Sm.
- Taeniophyllum clavicalcaratum (J.J.Sm.) Kocyan & Schuit.
- Taeniophyllum clementsii (D.L.Jones & B.Gray) Kocyan & Schuit.
- Taeniophyllum cochleare Schltr.
- Taeniophyllum coiloglossum Schltr.
- Taeniophyllum collinum (Schltr.) Kocyan & Schuit.
- Taeniophyllum compactum Ames
- Taeniophyllum complanatum Fukuy.
- Taeniophyllum concavum Schltr.
- Taeniophyllum confertum B.Gray & D.L.Jones
- Taeniophyllum confusum Kores & L.Jonss.
- Taeniophyllum conoceras Schltr.
- Taeniophyllum copelandii Ames
- Taeniophyllum coxii (Summerh.) Summerh.
- Taeniophyllum crenatum J.J.Sm.
- Taeniophyllum crepidiforme (King & Pantl.) King & Pantl.
- Taeniophyllum cucullatum Schltr.
- Taeniophyllum cycloglossum Schltr.
- Taeniophyllum cylindrocentrum Schltr.
- Taeniophyllum cymboglossum J.J.Sm.
- Taeniophyllum daroussinii Tixier & Guillaumin
- Taeniophyllum dentilobum J.J.Sm.)
- Taeniophyllum dischorense Schltr.
- Taeniophyllum djampangense J.J.Sm.
- Taeniophyllum doctersii J.J.Sm.
- Taeniophyllum elegantissimum Rchb.f.
- Taeniophyllum elmeri Ames
- Taeniophyllum engae J.J.Wood
- Taeniophyllum epacridicola B.Gray
- Taeniophyllum erinaceum Ridl.
- Taeniophyllum erosulum (J.J.Sm.) Kocyan & Schuit.
- Taeniophyllum esetiferum J.J.Sm.
- Taeniophyllum excavatum J.J.Sm.
- Taeniophyllum exotrachys Schltr.
- Taeniophyllum explanatum B.Gray
- Taeniophyllum fasciculatum Aver.
- Taeniophyllum fasciola (G.Forst.) Seem.
- Taeniophyllum ferox Schltr.
- Taeniophyllum ficicola Schltr.
- Taeniophyllum filiforme J.J.Sm.
- Taeniophyllum fimbriatum J.J.Sm.
- Taeniophyllum finisterrae (Schltr.) Kocyan & Schuit.
- Taeniophyllum flaccidum (Schltr.) Kocyan & Schuit.
- Taeniophyllum foliatum Schltr.
- Taeniophyllum fragrans Schltr.
- Taeniophyllum gilimalense Jayaw.
- Taeniophyllum giriwoense J.J.Sm.
- Taeniophyllum glandulosum Blume
- Taeniophyllum govidjoae (Schltr.) Kocyan & Schuit.
- Taeniophyllum gracile (Rolfe) Garay
- Taeniophyllum gracillimum Schltr.
- Taeniophyllum grandiflorum Schltr.
- Taeniophyllum graptolitum N.Hallé
- Taeniophyllum halmaheranum Cavestro & J.Champ.
- Taeniophyllum hasseltii Rchb.f.
- Taeniophyllum hirtum Blume
- Taeniophyllum hosokawae (Fukuy.) L.O.Williams
- Taeniophyllum hygrophilum Schltr.
- Taeniophyllum iboense Schltr.
- Taeniophyllum iboetii (J.J.Sm.) Kocyan & Schuit.
- Taeniophyllum inconspicuum Schltr.
- Taeniophyllum insulare Seidenf.
- Taeniophyllum intermedium Carr
- Taeniophyllum jacobsonii J.J.Sm.
- Taeniophyllum jadunae Schltr.
- Taeniophyllum javanicum (J.J.Sm.) Kocyan & Schuit.
- Taeniophyllum jensenianum J.J.Sm.
- Taeniophyllum kaniense Schltr.
- Taeniophyllum kapahense Carr
- Taeniophyllum kenejianum Schltr.
- Taeniophyllum keysseri Mansf.
- Taeniophyllum kompsopus Schltr.
- Taeniophyllum labatii (M.Pignal & Munzinger) J.M.H.Shaw
- Taeniophyllum lamii (J.J.Sm.) Kocyan & Schuit.
- Taeniophyllum lamprorhizum Schltr.
- Taeniophyllum latipetalum Schltr.
- Taeniophyllum laxum (Schltr.) Kocyan & Schuit.
- Taeniophyllum ledermannii Schltr.
- Taeniophyllum leeuwenii Kocyan & Schuit.
- Taeniophyllum leptorrhizum Schltr.
- Taeniophyllum leucanthum Schltr.
- Taeniophyllum leytense Ames
- Taeniophyllum lobatum Dockrill
- Taeniophyllum longicaule Kocyan & Schuit.
- Taeniophyllum longisetigerum J.J.Sm.
- Taeniophyllum luteum Kocyan & Schuit.
- Taeniophyllum macranthum Schltr.
- Taeniophyllum macrorhynchum Schltr.
- Taeniophyllum macrotaenium Schltr.
- Taeniophyllum malianum Schltr.
- Taeniophyllum mamilliferum J.J.Sm.
- Taeniophyllum mangiferae Schltr.
- Taeniophyllum manubrioliferum J.J.Sm.
- Taeniophyllum marianense Schltr.
- Taeniophyllum maximum J.J.Sm.
- Taeniophyllum merapiense Schltr.
- Taeniophyllum merrillii Ames
- Taeniophyllum micranthum Carr
- Taeniophyllum minimum Guillaumin
- Taeniophyllum minusculum Kocyan & Schuit.
- Taeniophyllum minutiflorum J.J.Sm.
- Taeniophyllum mirum-labellum Kocyan & Schuit.
- Taeniophyllum montanum Carr
- Taeniophyllum muelleri Lindl. ex Benth.
- Taeniophyllum multiflorum (Ridl.) Kocyan & Schuit.
- Taeniophyllum muricatum Schltr.
- Taeniophyllum muriculatum (Schltr.) Kocyan & Schuit.
- Taeniophyllum musciforme (Schltr.) Kocyan & Schuit.
- Taeniophyllum neopommeranicum Schltr.
- Taeniophyllum neotorricellense Kocyan & Schuit.
- Taeniophyllum nephrophorum Schltr.
- Taeniophyllum norfolkianum D.L.Jones, B.Gray & M.A.Clem.
- Taeniophyllum northlandicum R.Rice & M.A.M.Renner
- Taeniophyllum oblongum Schltr.
- Taeniophyllum occultans (Schuit. & de Vogel) Kocyan & Schuit.
- Taeniophyllum orbiculare Schltr.
- Taeniophyllum oreophilum (Schltr.) Kocyan & Schuit.
- Taeniophyllum orthorhynchum Schltr.
- Taeniophyllum ovale Schltr.
- Taeniophyllum pachyacris Schltr.
- Taeniophyllum pahangense Carr
- Taeniophyllum paife Drake
- Taeniophyllum palawense Schltr.
- Taeniophyllum pallidiflorum Carr)
- Taeniophyllum pallidum Schltr.
- Taeniophyllum palmicola Schltr. in K.M.Schumann & C.A.G.Lauterbach
- Taeniophyllum paludicola Schltr.
- Taeniophyllum paludosum J.J.Sm.
- Taeniophyllum pantjarense J.J.Sm.
- Taeniophyllum papillosum (J.J.Sm.) Kocyan & Schuit.
- Taeniophyllum papuanum (Schltr.) L.O.Williams
- Taeniophyllum pectiniferum Schltr.
- Taeniophyllum petrophilum Schltr.
- Taeniophyllum phaeanthum Schltr.
- Taeniophyllum philippinense Rchb.f.
- Taeniophyllum phitamii Aver.
- Taeniophyllum physodes Schltr.
- Taeniophyllum platyrhachis (Schltr.) Kocyan & Schuit.
- Taeniophyllum platyrhizum Schltr.
- Taeniophyllum pleistorhizum Schltr.
- Taeniophyllum podochiloides (J.J.Sm.) Kocyan & Schuit.
- Taeniophyllum potamophyllum Schltr.
- Taeniophyllum proboscideum Schltr.
- Taeniophyllum proliferum J.J.Sm.
- Taeniophyllum pterophorum (Schltr.) Kocyan & Schuit.
- Taeniophyllum pubicarpum Schltr.
- Taeniophyllum pulchellum Cootes, Cabactulan, R.B.Pimentel & M.Leon
- Taeniophyllum pulvinatum Schltr.
- Taeniophyllum pusillum (Willd.) Seidenf. & Ormerod
- Taeniophyllum pyriforme Schuit.
- Taeniophyllum quadratum Schltr.
- Taeniophyllum quadrilobum Seidenf.
- Taeniophyllum quaquaversum Schltr.
- Taeniophyllum radiatum J.J.Sm.
- Taeniophyllum recurvirostrum J.J.Sm.
- Taeniophyllum reijnvaanae J.J.Sm.
- Taeniophyllum retrospiculatum (King & Pantl.) King & Pantl.
- Taeniophyllum rhodantherum Schltr.
- Taeniophyllum rhombeum Kocyan & Schuit.
- Taeniophyllum rhomboglossum Schltr.
- Taeniophyllum robustum Schltr.
- Taeniophyllum rostellatum J.J.Sm.
- Taeniophyllum rostratum Carr
- Taeniophyllum rubrum Ridl.
- Taeniophyllum rudolfii Kocyan & Schuit.
- Taeniophyllum rugulosum Carr
- Taeniophyllum saccatum L.O.Williams
- Taeniophyllum samoense (Schltr.) Kocyan & Schuit.
- Taeniophyllum savaiiense P.J.Cribb & Whistler
- Taeniophyllum scaberulum Hook.f.
- Taeniophyllum schlechteri Mansf.
- Taeniophyllum setipes Schltr.
- Taeniophyllum singulare J.J.Sm.
- Taeniophyllum smithii Kores & L.Jonss.
- Taeniophyllum steenisii (J.J.Sm.) Kocyan & Schuit.
- Taeniophyllum stella Carr
- Taeniophyllum stenosepalum Schltr.
- Taeniophyllum stipulaceum J.J.Sm.
- Taeniophyllum subtrilobum Schltr.
- Taeniophyllum sulawesiense Kocyan & Schuit.
- Taeniophyllum sumatranum Schltr.
- Taeniophyllum taenioides (P.O'Byrne) Kocyan & Schuit.
- Taeniophyllum tamianum J.J.Sm.
- Taeniophyllum tenerrimum J.J.Sm.
- Taeniophyllum terrestre (J.J.Sm.) Kocyan & Schuit.
- Taeniophyllum toranum J.J.Sm.
- Taeniophyllum torricellense Schltr.
- Taeniophyllum trachybracteum Schltr.
- Taeniophyllum trachypus Schltr.
- Taeniophyllum triangulare J.J.Sm.
- Taeniophyllum triangulipetalum (J.J.Sm.) Kocyan & Schuit.
- Taeniophyllum trichopus Schltr.
- Taeniophyllum trilobum Schltr.
- Taeniophyllum tripulvinatum J.J.Sm.
- Taeniophyllum triquetroradix B.Gray
- Taeniophyllum trukense Fukuy.
- Taeniophyllum tubulosum (J.J.Sm.) L.O.Williams
- Taeniophyllum wakatinense J.J.Sm.
- Taeniophyllum walkeri B.Gray
- Taeniophyllum whistleri P.J.Cribb
- Taeniophyllum xerophilum Schltr.
- Taeniophyllum xizangense J.D.Ya & C.Liu
