= Balaka insularis =

Conservation status
- Critically Endangered (IUCN 2.3)

Scientific classification
- Kingdom: Plantae
- Clade: Embryophytes
- Clade: Tracheophytes
- Clade: Spermatophytes
- Clade: Angiosperms
- Clade: Monocots
- Clade: Commelinids
- Order: Arecales
- Family: Arecaceae
- Subfamily: Arecoideae
- Tribe: Areceae
- Subtribe: Ptychospermatinae
- Genus: Balaka
- Species: B. insularis

Binomial name
- Balaka insularis Zona & W.J.Baker

Synonyms
- Drymophloeus samoensis (Rech.) Becc. ex Martelli; Solfia samoensis Rech.

Species of palm

Balaka insularis is a rare species of flowering plant in the palm family endemic to Samoa. It was formerly placed in the monotypic genus Solfia with the species name Solfia samoensis. It was placed in the genus Balaka in 2014.

== Description ==
The trunk is solitary and ringed, colored brown, no more than 8 cm wide. The sheath of the pinnate leaf is extended, wrapping around the trunk to form a tall, slender crownshaft. The petiole is short, the thin rachis bears regularly spaced, reduplicate leaflets with a prominent midrib and jagged ends. The inflorescence emerges below the crownshaft, initially enclosed by a prophyll, with a single peduncular bract. Monoecious, there are staminate and pistillate flowers present in each plant, borne on the rachillae as triads of two males surrounding one female. Fleshy and red when ripe, the fruit becomes wrinkled when dry, carrying one seed with homogeneous endosperm.

== Distribution and habitat ==
Balaka insularis is one of the palms confined to Samoa, growing in wet, mountainous, montane rain and cloud forests, exceeding 500 m. Palms endemic to Samoa also include Balaka samoensis, Balaka tahitensis, and Clinostigma samoense.
