= Cryptocarya samoensis =

Conservation status
- Critically Endangered (IUCN 3.1)

Scientific classification
- Kingdom: Plantae
- Clade: Tracheophytes
- Clade: Angiosperms
- Clade: Magnoliids
- Order: Laurales
- Family: Lauraceae
- Genus: Cryptocarya
- Species: C. samoensis

Binomial name
- Cryptocarya samoensis Christoph.

Species of flowering plant

Cryptocarya samoensis is a species of plant in the laurel family Lauraceae. It is a tree endemic to Samoa, and is currently suffering habitat loss.

== See also ==
- List of endemic plants of Samoa
