= Chionodes ochreostrigella =

Scientific classification
- Kingdom: Animalia
- Phylum: Arthropoda
- Clade: Pancrustacea
- Class: Insecta
- Order: Lepidoptera
- Family: Gelechiidae
- Genus: Chionodes
- Species: C. ochreostrigella

Binomial name
- Chionodes ochreostrigella (Chambers, 1875)

Synonyms
- Gelechia ochreostrigella Chambers, 1875

Species of moth

Chionodes ochreostrigella is a moth in the family Gelechiidae. It is found in North America, where it has been recorded from Alberta, Oregon, Arizona and California.

The wingspan is about 24 mm. The forewings are pale ochreous-yellow beneath the fold, while the basal portion above the fold and extending along the costal margin as far as the middle is dark brown with a faint purple tinge. All the veins and veinlets are dark brown, while the cell and the spaces between the marginal veinlets and between the median and sub-median veins are pale ochreous-yellow. The course of the fold towards the dorsal margin is also faintly marked with brown, the apex is brown.

The larvae feed on Rumex species, including Rumex acetosella and Rumex crispus.
