= Taeniophyllum baumei =

Scientific classification
- Kingdom: Plantae
- Clade: Embryophytes
- Clade: Tracheophytes
- Clade: Spermatophytes
- Clade: Angiosperms
- Clade: Monocots
- Order: Asparagales
- Family: Orchidaceae
- Subfamily: Epidendroideae
- Genus: Taeniophyllum
- Species: T. baumei

Binomial name
- Taeniophyllum baumei B.Gray

Species of orchid

Taeniophyllum baumei is an epiphytic orchid, native to Cape York Peninsula in the wet tropics of Queensland, Australia. It was first described in 2018 by Bruce Gray.

== Description ==
Like all species of Taeniophyllum it is effectively leafless and has photosynthetic roots. Within the Australian species of Taeniophyllum it is distinguished by: its inflorescence which has 6-20 flowers, which are tightly arranged and are not self-pollinating, and by its roots which are terete in cross-section.
