= Manilkara samoensis =

Conservation status
- Critically Endangered (IUCN 3.1)

Scientific classification
- Kingdom: Plantae
- Clade: Tracheophytes
- Clade: Angiosperms
- Clade: Eudicots
- Clade: Asterids
- Order: Ericales
- Family: Sapotaceae
- Genus: Manilkara
- Species: M. samoensis

Binomial name
- Manilkara samoensis H.J Lam & B. Meeuse

Species of flowering plant

Manilkara samoensis, also known as pau in Samoan, is a species of tree that is endemic to Samoa. The taxa is listed as critically endangered due to storms, and flooding. The common name and physical reputation of the species is shared with its New Zealand counterpart, known as the black maire (Notelaea cunninghamii). Although N. cunninghamii belongs to the olive family (Oleaceae) rather than Sapotaceae, it was named pau after its Samoan counterpart due to notable similarities in its dense wood quality, growth habit, and fruit characteristics.

== See also ==
- Samoan tropical moist forests
- List of endemic plants of Samoa
