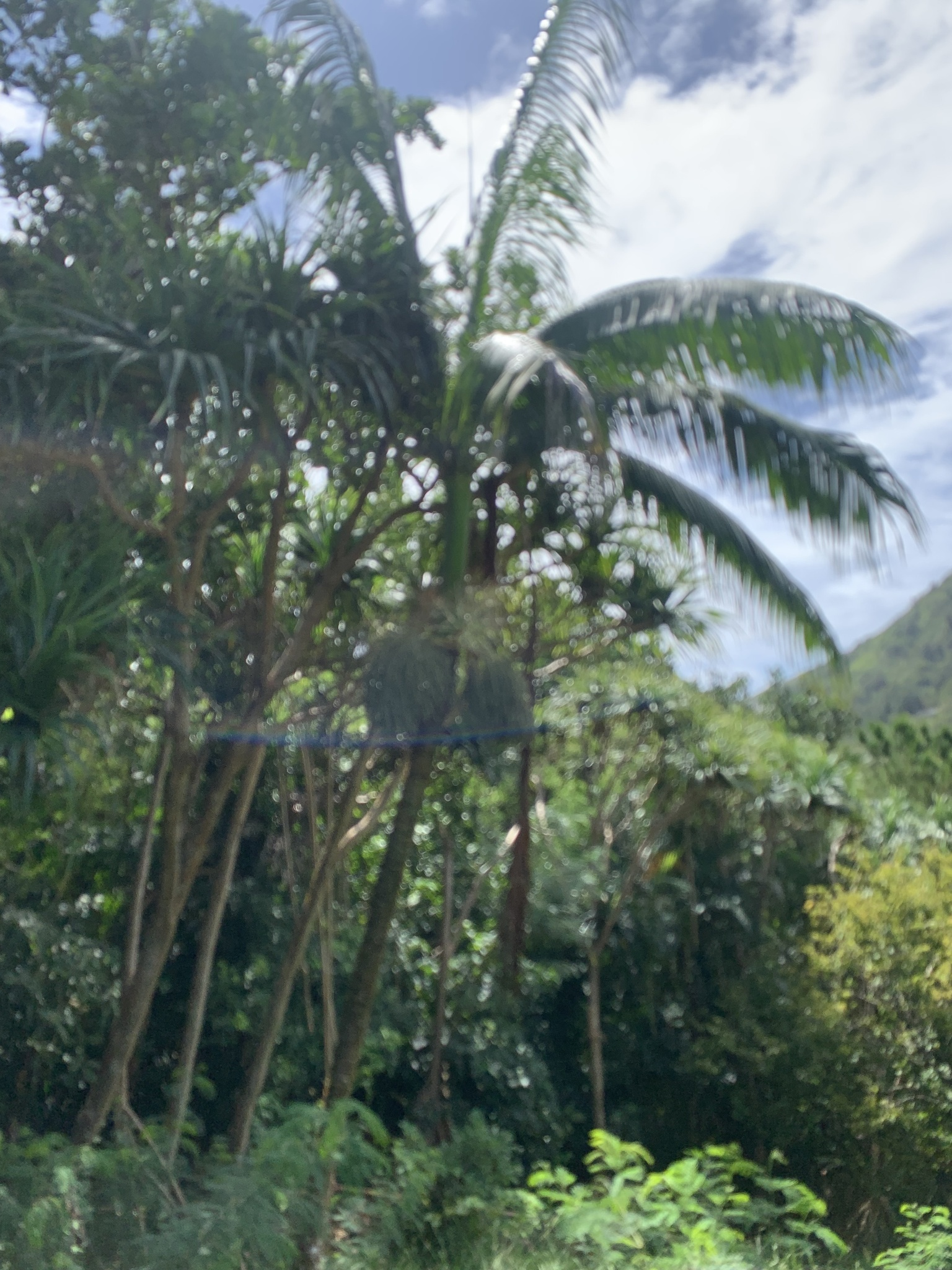

Conservation status
- Data Deficient (IUCN 2.3)

Scientific classification
- Kingdom: Plantae
- Clade: Tracheophytes
- Clade: Angiosperms
- Clade: Monocots
- Clade: Commelinids
- Order: Arecales
- Family: Arecaceae
- Genus: Clinostigma
- Species: C. savoryanum

Binomial name
- Clinostigma savoryanum (Rehder & Wils.) Moore & Fosb.

Synonyms
- Clinostigma savoryana (Rehder & Wils.) Moore & Fosb. (common misspelling); Cyphokentia savoryana Rehder & E.H.Wilson; Bentinckiopsis savoryana (Rehder & E.H.Wilson) Becc.; Exorrhiza savoryana (Rehder & E.H.Wilson) Burret

= Clinostigma savoryanum =

Species of palm

Clinostigma savoryanum, also known as the Pacific beauty palm and arrack tree, is a species of flowering plant in the family Arecaceae. It is endemic to the Bonin Islands of Japan. It is threatened by habitat loss.
