= Balaka pauciflora =

Scientific classification
- Kingdom: Plantae
- Clade: Tracheophytes
- Clade: Angiosperms
- Clade: Monocots
- Clade: Commelinids
- Order: Arecales
- Family: Arecaceae
- Genus: Balaka
- Species: B. pauciflora

Binomial name
- Balaka pauciflora Becc.

Species of palm

Balaka pauciflora is a species of flowering plant in the family Arecaceae. It is found only in Fiji. The specific epithet pauciflora is Latin for 'few-flowered'.
