= Clinostigma exorrhizum =

Conservation status
- Least Concern (IUCN 3.1)

Scientific classification
- Kingdom: Plantae
- Clade: Embryophytes
- Clade: Tracheophytes
- Clade: Spermatophytes
- Clade: Angiosperms
- Clade: Monocots
- Clade: Commelinids
- Order: Arecales
- Family: Arecaceae
- Genus: Clinostigma
- Species: C. exorrhizum

Binomial name
- Clinostigma exorrhizum (H.A. Wendl.) Becc.

Species of palm

Clinostigma exorrhizum is a species of flowering plant in the family Arecaceae. It is found only in Fiji.
