= Balaka siliensis =

Scientific classification
- Kingdom: Plantae
- Clade: Tracheophytes
- Clade: Angiosperms
- Clade: Monocots
- Clade: Commelinids
- Order: Arecales
- Family: Arecaceae
- Genus: Balaka
- Species: B. siliensis

Binomial name
- Balaka siliensis Christoph.

Species of flowering plant

Balaka siliensis Is a species of palm in the family Arecaceae. It is endemic to Savaiʻi, the largest islands of Samoa.

== Description ==
It typically grows up to 5 metres in height with a stem diameter of approximately 5 cm at breast height (dbh). The plant features several alternate, pinnately compound leaves up to 1 metre long, which terminate in a distinctive, deeply notched "fish-tail" shape formed by fused leaflets. characterized by multi-branched axillary panicles, 30–60 cm in length, which bear clusters of unisexual flowers. These flowers are arranged in triads consisting of two staminate (male) flowers and one pistillate (female) flower. The fruit is a red, ovoid-to-lanceolate drupe, 2.8–4.2 cm long, with an irregularly ridged surface when desiccated. Flowering and fruiting are continuous throughout the year.

== See also ==
- Flora of Samoa
- List of endemic plants of Samoa
