= Mark Alwin Clements =

Australian botanist and orchidologist

Dr. Mark Alwin Clements
- Born: 1949 (age 76–77)
- Scientific career
- Fields: Botany
- Author abbrev. (botany): M.A.Clem.

Mark Alwin Clements (b. 1949) is an Australian botanist and orchidologist. He obtained his doctorate at the Australian National University defending his thesis Reproductive Biology in Relation to Phylogeny of the Orchidaceae, Especially the Tribe Diurideae.

In 2008, Clements was a researcher at the Center for Research on Plant Biodiversity at the Australian National Botanic Gardens in Canberra. As of January 2012, it had identified and classified 1,992 new species.

== Publications ==
- Weston, P.H.; Clements, M.A.; Dyer, A.G.; Batley, M; Whelan, R.J.; Indsto, J.O. (2007). "Generalised pollination of Diuris alba (Orchidaceae) by small bees and wasps". Australian Journal of Botany. 55: 628.
- Indsto, JO; Weston PH; Clements MA; Dyer AG; Batley M; Whelan RJ. 2006. Pollination of Diuris maculata (Orchidaceae) by male Trichocolletes venustus bees. Australian Journal of Botany 54 (7): 669
- MA Clements. 2006. Molecular phylogenetic systematics in Dendrobieae (Orchidaceae). Aliso 22: 465—480
- Indsto, JO; PH Weston; MA Clements; RJ Whelan. 2005. Highly sensitive DNA fingerprinting of orchid pollinaria remnants using AFLP. Australian Systematic Botany 18 (3): 207 - 213
- MA Clements. 2003. Molecular phylogenetic systematics in the Dendrobiinae (Orchidaceae), with emphasis on Dendrobium section Pedilonum. Telopea 10: 247—298
- Jones, DL; MA Clement. 2002. A Review of Pterestylis (orchidaceae). Ed. Australian Orchid Foundation. ISBN 0-642-54904-4

== Honours ==
- (Orchidaceae) Flickingeria clementsii D.L.Jones
- (Orchidaceae) Microtatorchis clementsii D.L.Jones and B.Gray
