= Homalanthus acuminatus =

Conservation status
- Least Concern (IUCN 3.1)

Scientific classification
- Kingdom: Plantae
- Clade: Embryophytes
- Clade: Tracheophytes
- Clade: Spermatophytes
- Clade: Angiosperms
- Clade: Eudicots
- Clade: Rosids
- Order: Malpighiales
- Family: Euphorbiaceae
- Genus: Homalanthus
- Species: H. acuminatus

Binomial name
- Homalanthus acuminatus (Müll.Arg.) Pax (1931)

Synonyms
- Carumbium acuminatum Müll.Arg; Macaranga reineckei Pax

Species of flowering plant

Homalanthus acuminatus, the fogamamala, is a species of shrub in the Spurge family (Euphorbiaceae). It is endemic to Samoa. It is currently listed as least concern.

== See also ==
- List of endemic plants of Samoa
- Samoan tropical moist forests
