= Clinostigma haerestigma =

Conservation status
- Data Deficient (IUCN 2.3)

Scientific classification
- Kingdom: Plantae
- Clade: Tracheophytes
- Clade: Angiosperms
- Clade: Monocots
- Clade: Commelinids
- Order: Arecales
- Family: Arecaceae
- Genus: Clinostigma
- Species: C. haerestigma

Binomial name
- Clinostigma haerestigma H.E.Moore

Species of palm

Clinostigma haerestigma is a species of flowering plant in the family Arecaceae.

== Distribution and habitat ==
It is endemic to the Solomon Islands where it is threatened by habitat loss. It has been observed growing in lowland forests on ultrabasic soils.
