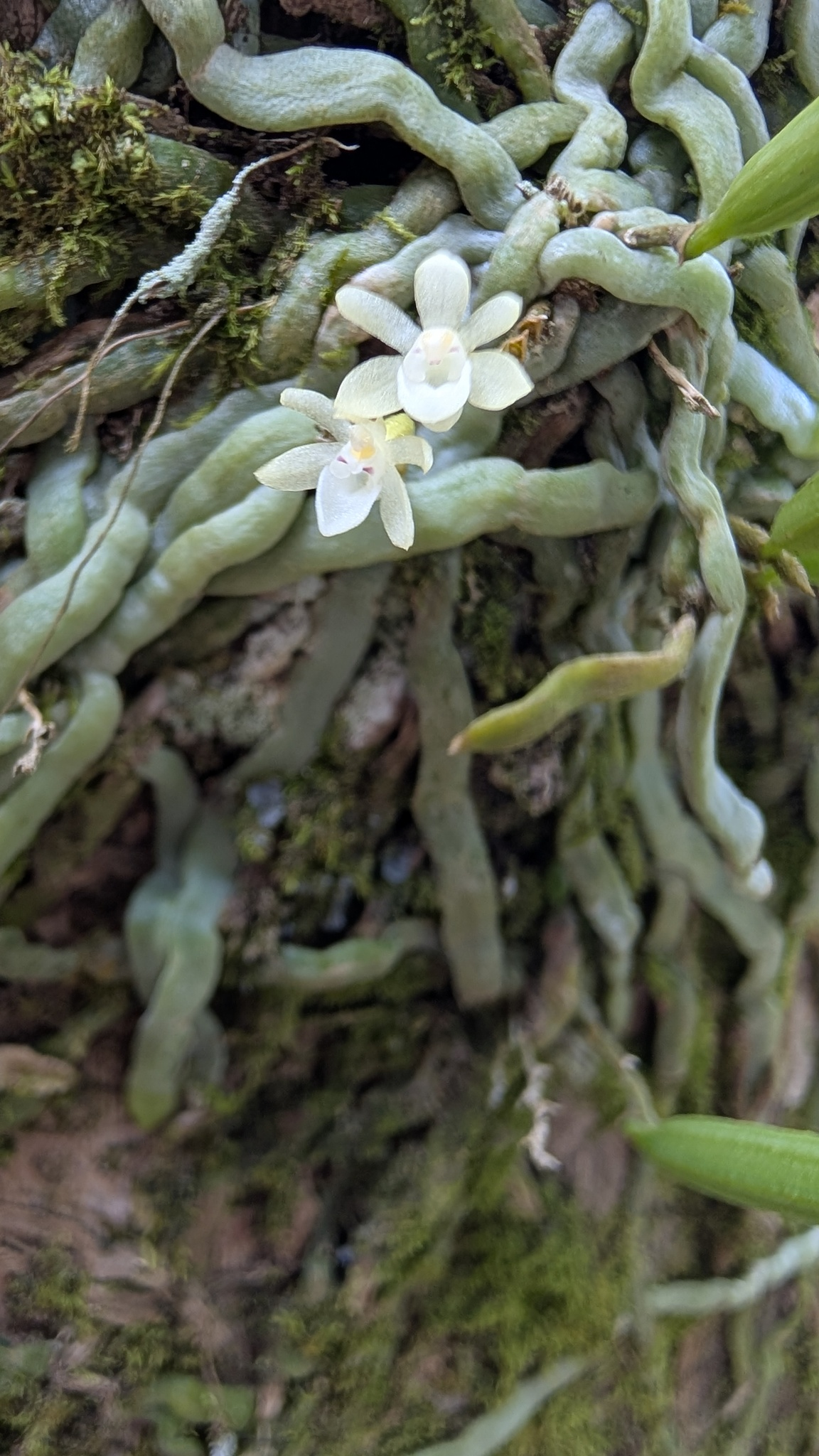
- Photosynthetic roots together with flowers (on a palm tree trunk in Suva)

Scientific classification
- Kingdom: Plantae
- Clade: Tracheophytes
- Clade: Angiosperms
- Clade: Monocots
- Order: Asparagales
- Family: Orchidaceae
- Subfamily: Epidendroideae
- Genus: Taeniophyllum
- Species: T. fasciola

Binomial name
- Taeniophyllum fasciola (G.Forst.) Seem.

Synonyms
- Epidendrum fasciola G.Forst. Limodoron fasciolum (G.Forst.) St.-Lag. Limodorum fasciola (G.Forst.) Sw. Microtatorchis fasciola (G.Forst.) Schltr. Vanilla fasciola (G.Forst.) Spreng. Taeniophyllum asperulum Rchb.f. Taeniophyllum decipiens Schltr. Taeniophyllum fasciola var. mutina N.Hallé; Taeniophyllum minutissimum Schltr. Taeniophyllum parhamiae L.O.Williams; Taeniophyllum seemannii Rchb.f.

= Taeniophyllum fasciola =

Species of orchid

Taeniophyllum fasciola is an epiphytic orchid, native to many Pacific islands.

Like all species of Taeniophyllum it is effectively leafless with photosynthetic roots.

It was first described in 1786 as Epidendrum fasciola by Georg Forster and was renamed and redescribed many times. In 1862 it received its current name when it was assigned to the genus Taeniophyllum by Berthold Carl Seemann.

== Distribution ==
It is found on the following Pacific islands: the Cook Islands, Fiji, the Marianas, New Caledonia, Niue, Pitcairn Island, Samoa, the Society Islands, the Solomons, Tonga, Tuamotu, Tubuai Island, Vanuatu, and Wallis and Futuna Islands.
