= Clinostigma savaiiense =

Conservation status
- Critically Endangered (IUCN 3.1)

Scientific classification
- Kingdom: Plantae
- Clade: Tracheophytes
- Clade: Angiosperms
- Clade: Monocots
- Clade: Commelinids
- Order: Arecales
- Family: Arecaceae
- Genus: Clinostigma
- Species: C. savaiiense

Binomial name
- Clinostigma savaiiense Christoph.

Synonyms
- Clinostigma vaupeli Burret.; Exorrhiza vaupelii Burret

Species of flowering plant

Clinostigma savaiiense, is a species of flowering plant in the palm family (Arecaceae). It is endemic to Samoa, where it is found on high montane forests. It is Critically Endangered and is currently conserved at the Vailima Botanical Gardens, along with many other endangered endemic plants.

== See also ==
- Samoan tropical moist forests
