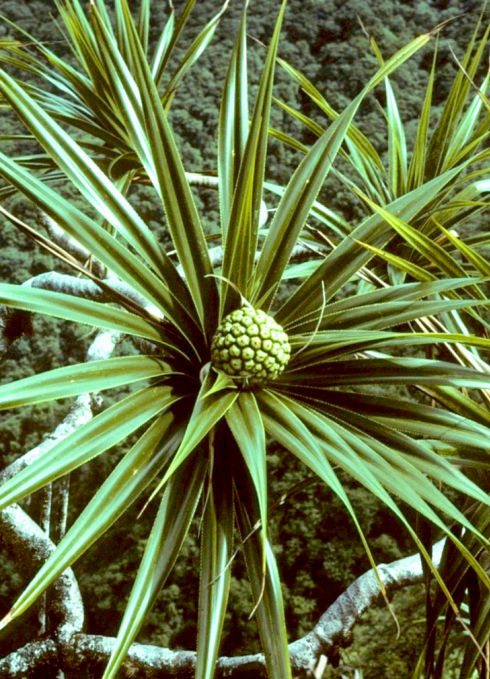

Scientific classification
- Kingdom: Plantae
- Clade: Embryophytes
- Clade: Tracheophytes
- Clade: Angiosperms
- Clade: Monocots
- Order: Pandanales
- Family: Pandanaceae
- Genus: Pandanus
- Species: P. reineckei

Binomial name
- Pandanus reineckei Warb.

Synonyms
- Pandanus paucicarpellatus H.St.John

= Pandanus reineckei =

Species of flowering plant

Pandanus reineckei is a species of flowering plant belonging to the Pandanaceae family. It is endemic to Samoa.

== See also ==
- Flora of Samoa
- List of endemic plants of Samoa
- Samoan tropical moist forests
