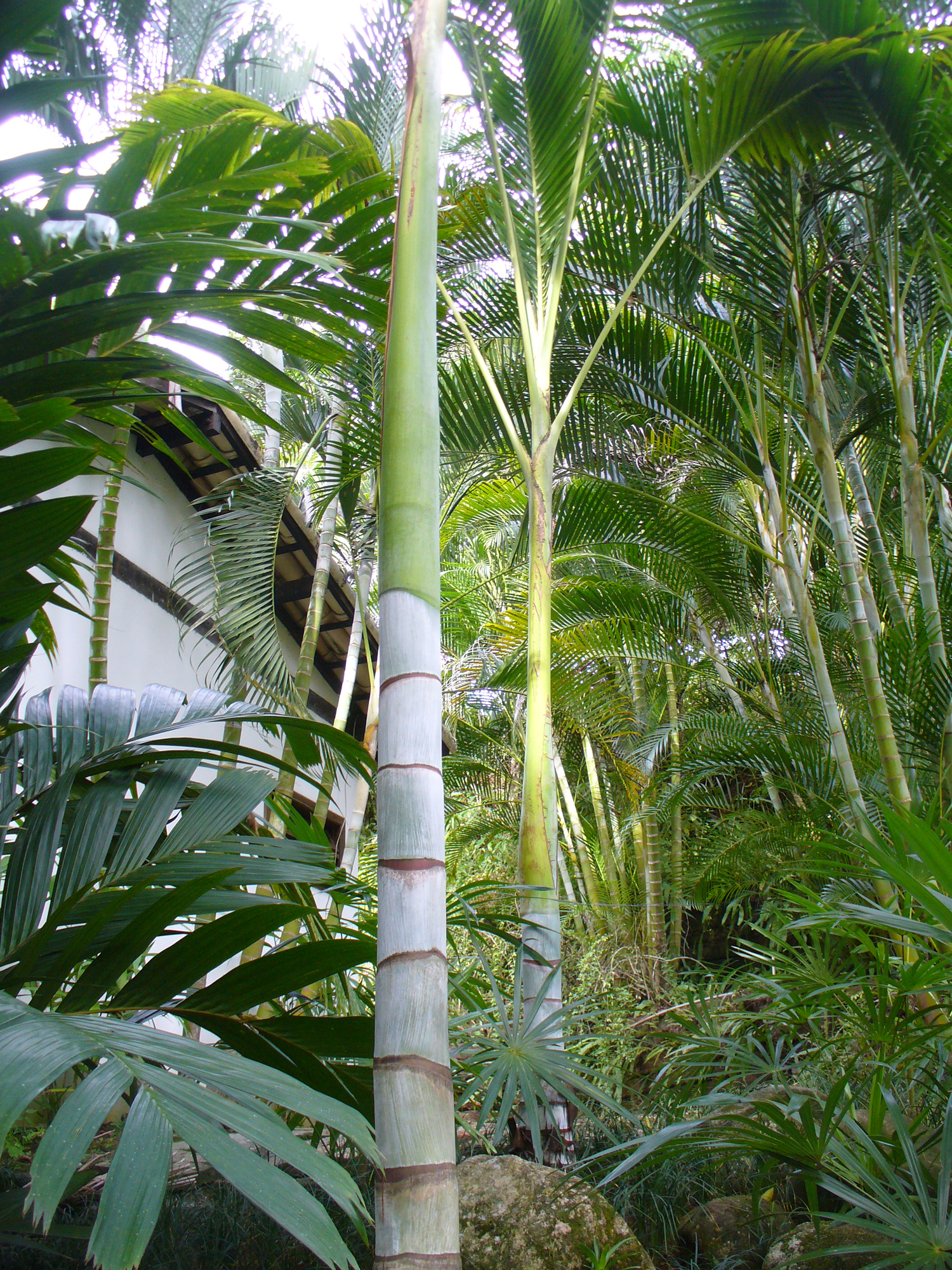

Conservation status
- Near Threatened (IUCN 2.3)

Scientific classification
- Kingdom: Plantae
- Clade: Embryophytes
- Clade: Tracheophytes
- Clade: Angiosperms
- Clade: Monocots
- Clade: Commelinids
- Order: Arecales
- Family: Arecaceae
- Genus: Clinostigma
- Species: C. harlandii

Binomial name
- Clinostigma harlandii Becc.

= Clinostigma harlandii =

Species of palm

Clinostigma harlandii is a species of flowering plant in the family Arecaceae. It is found only in Vanuatu. It is threatened by habitat loss.
