= Balaka macrocarpa =

Conservation status
- Endangered (IUCN 3.1)

Scientific classification
- Kingdom: Plantae
- Clade: Tracheophytes
- Clade: Angiosperms
- Clade: Monocots
- Clade: Commelinids
- Order: Arecales
- Family: Arecaceae
- Genus: Balaka
- Species: B. macrocarpa

Binomial name
- Balaka macrocarpa Burret

Species of palm

Balaka macrocarpa is a species of small palm in the family Arecaceae.

It is found only in Fiji and is threatened by habitat loss.

== Description ==
Balaka macrocarpa grows to a height of up to 8m and has a green trunk.
