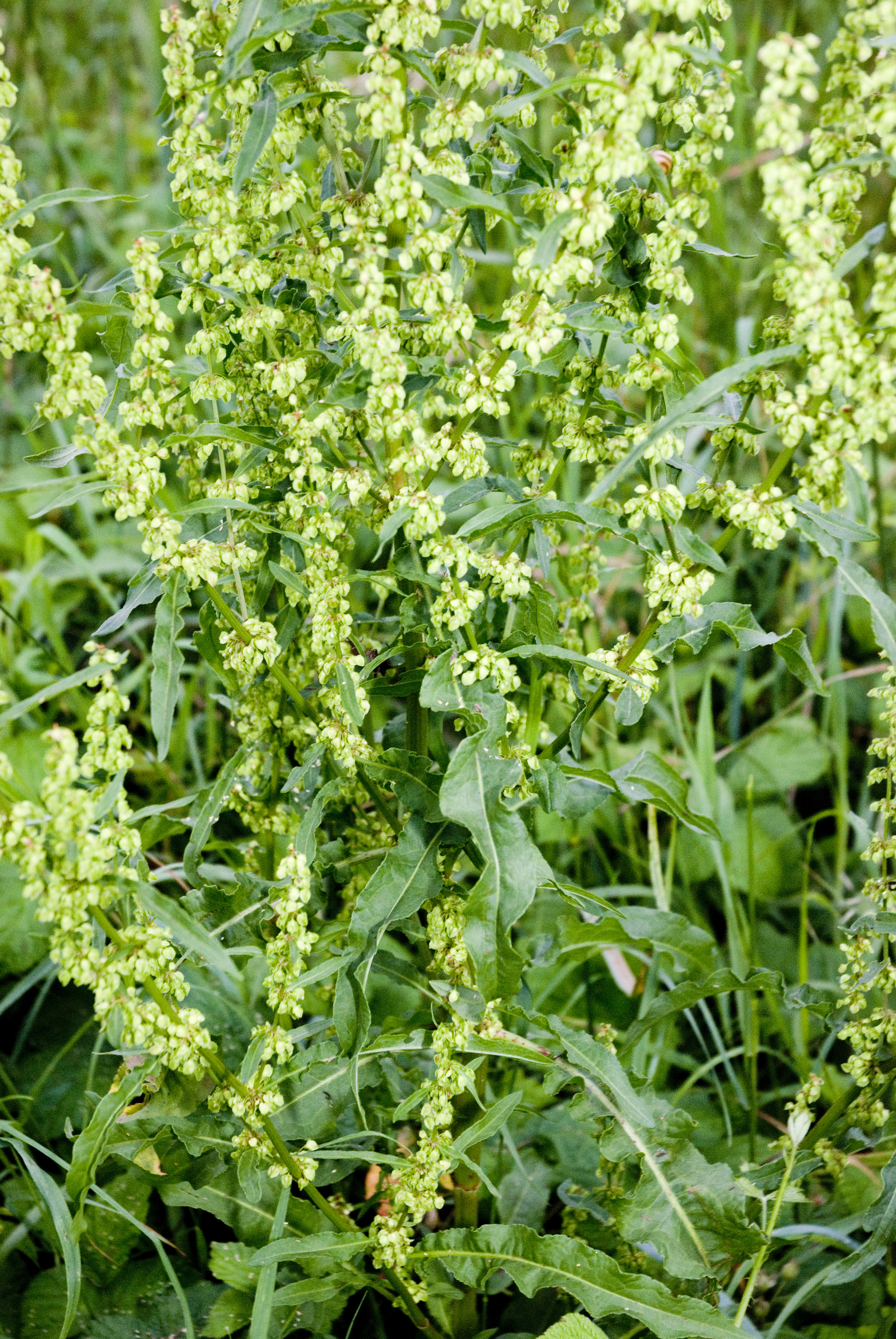

Scientific classification
- Kingdom: Plantae
- Clade: Tracheophytes
- Clade: Angiosperms
- Clade: Eudicots
- Order: Caryophyllales
- Family: Polygonaceae
- Genus: Rumex
- Species: R. crispus

Binomial name
- Rumex crispus L.

Subspecies
- Rumex crispus crispus L.; Rumex crispus littoreus (Hardy) Akeroyd; Rumex crispus robustus (Rech.) Pestova; Rumex crispus strictissimus (Rech. f.) Pestova; Rumex crispus uliginosus (Le Gall) Akeroyd

Synonyms
- Lapathum crispum (L.) Scop.; Rumex patienta var. crispus (L.) Kuntze; Rumex elongatus Guss.; Rumex fauriei Rech. f.; Rheum crispum G. Don; Rumex coreanus Nakai; Rumex crispus var. fauriei (Rech. f.) Reveal; Rumex crispus subsp. fauriei (Rech. f.) Mosyakin & W.L. Wagner; Rumex crispus var. littoralis Vayr.; Rumex crispus var. unicallosus Lej. & Courtois; Rumex kunthii Campd.; Rumex lingulatus Schur; Rumex longifolius Kunth; Rumex luederi Münter; Rumex turcicus Boiss.

= Rumex crispus =

Species of flowering plant

Rumex crispus, the curly dock, curled dock or yellow dock, is a perennial flowering plant in the family Polygonaceae, native to Europe and Western Asia.

== Description ==
The plant produces an inflorescence or flower stalk that grows to 1.5 metres (5 feet) high. It has smooth leaves shooting off from a large basal rosette, with distinctive waved or curled edges; these can grow to 14–24 centimetres (5 1/2–9 1/2 inches). On the stalk, flowers and seeds are produced in clusters on branched stems, with the largest cluster being found at the apex. The seeds are shiny, brown and encased in the calyx of the flower that produced them. This casing enables the seeds to float on water and get caught in wool and animal fur, and this helps the seeds spread to new locations. The root structure is a large, yellow, forking taproot.

Rumex crispus has a number of subspecies with distinctive habitat preferences. R. crispus ssp. crispus occurs on waste and cultivated ground. R. crispus ssp. littoreus has a coastal distribution, and R. crispus ssp. uliginosus occurs on tidal estuarine mud. The species hybridizes readily with other Rumex species including Rumex obtusifolius, Rumex obovatus, Rumex palustris and Rumex maritimus.

== Distribution ==
Native across temperate Eurasia, and widespread as an introduced species in North America and other temperate regions.

== Ecology ==
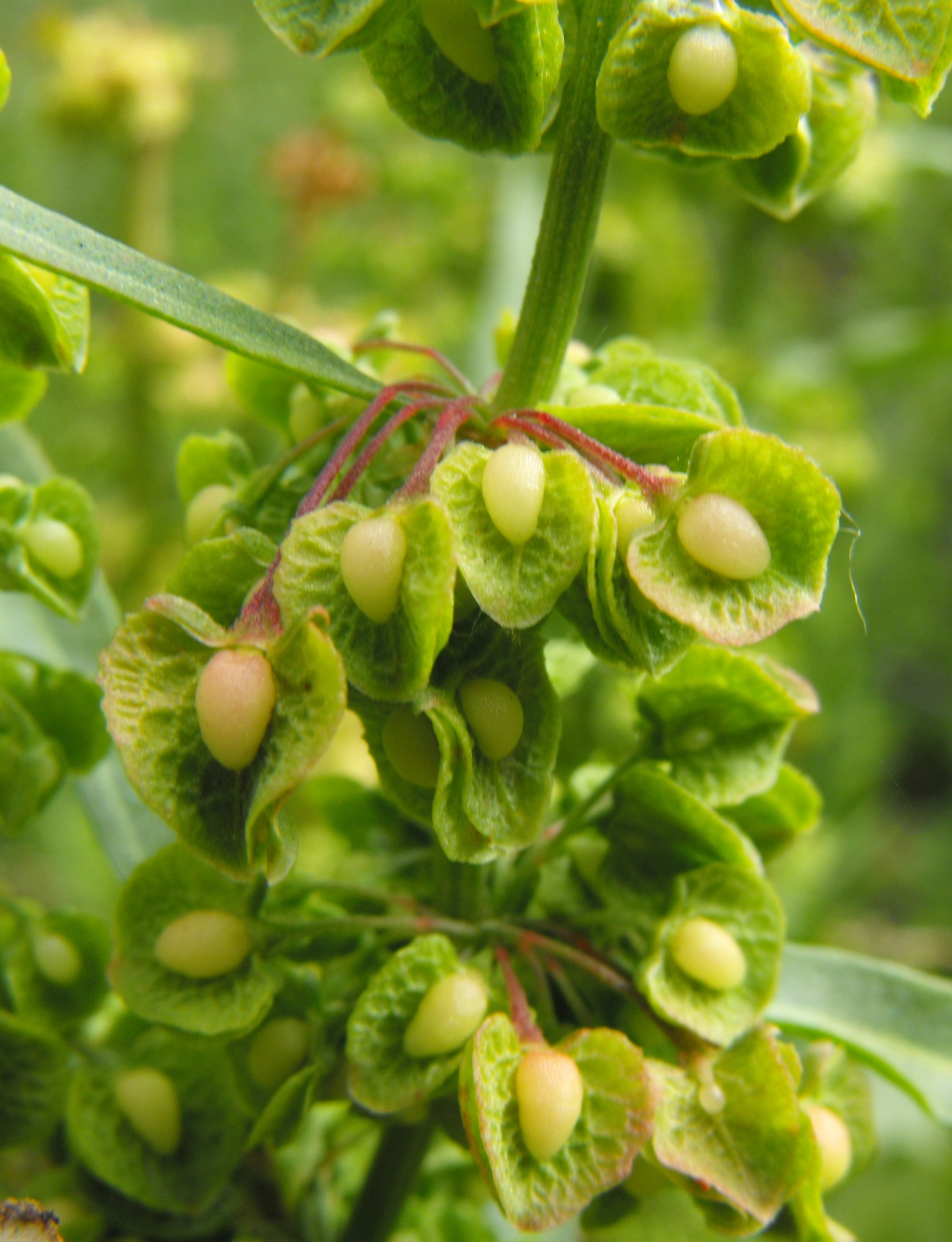
Fruits of curled dock (R. crispus)

Curly dock grows in a wide variety of habitats, including disturbed soil, waste areas, roadsides, fields/meadows, shorelines, and forest edges. It is widely naturalised throughout the temperate world and has become a serious invasive species in many areas, including throughout North America, southern South America, New Zealand and parts of Australia. It spreads through the seeds contaminating crop seeds, and sticking to clothing. It is classified as an "injurious weed" under the UK Weeds Act 1959. In the United States, it is classified as a noxious weed in the states of Arkansas and Iowa. It is often seen in disturbed soils at the edges of roadsides, railway beds, and car parks.

=== Host plant ===
The curled dock is an optimal host plant for certain Lepidoptera species including, Agrotis ipsilon (black cutworm). Adult moths oviposit on these dense, low-lying leaves during the spring/summer season.

== Uses and toxicity ==
It can be used as a wild leaf vegetable; the young leaves should be boiled in several changes of water to remove as much of the oxalic acid in the leaves as possible or can be added directly to salads in moderate amounts. Once the plant matures it becomes too bitter to consume. Dock leaves are an excellent source of both vitamin A and vitamin C, as well as a source of iron and potassium. Curly dock leaves are somewhat tart due to the presence of high levels of oxalic acid, and although quite palatable, this plant should only be consumed in moderation as it can irritate the urinary tract and increase the risk of developing kidney stones. It should be used with care during lactation, as it may cause a laxative effect in the infant.

In Armenia the young plants are harvested and dried and to make a product called Aveluk (ավելուկ). During drying fermentation takes place to make it less bitter. The dried plants are braided into rings and sold. Aveluk is used extensively in Armenian cookery as the basis of salads and soups for which it is reconstituted by boiling in water.

The seeds of the yellow dock, once dried thoroughly, are edible as well. The dark-brown to black seed pods remain on the stalk until the spring when leaves start growing again. While many wild foraged grains must be winnowed, the pods of Rumex crispus are small enough that it is more efficient to grind them with the grain. The resulting flour is much like buckwheat in flavor, and while some may find it too bitter, many prefer the seeds over the tartness of the leaves.

In Western herbalism, the root is often used for treating anemia, due to its high level of iron. It can be powdered and given in capsules, often in combination with stinging nettle (Urtica dioica). This is a classic combination with the plant. Both the leaves and root may be laxative in some individuals, though not in all, and generally it is mild. This is due to the presence of anthraquinone glycosides, and is not an action that should be relied upon, but seen as a possible effect of the plant when taken. The plant may also cause intestinal discomfort to some people. The plant will help with skin conditions if taken internally or applied externally to things like itching, scrofula, and sores. Some studies show that certain anthraquinones can help stop or slow cancer growth, but this may or may not apply to the ones in yellow dock.

Yellow dock is part of the homeopathic pharmacopoeia. It is used mainly for respiratory conditions, specifically those with a tickling cough that is worse when exposed to cold air. It mentions also passing pains, excessive itching, and that it helps enlarged lymphs.

The Zuni people apply a poultice of the powdered root to sores, rashes and skin infections, and use infusion of the root for athlete's foot.
