= Litsea samoensis =

Conservation status
- Vulnerable (IUCN 3.1)

Scientific classification
- Kingdom: Plantae
- Clade: Tracheophytes
- Clade: Angiosperms
- Clade: Magnoliids
- Order: Laurales
- Family: Lauraceae
- Genus: Litsea
- Species: L. samoensis

Binomial name
- Litsea samoensis (Christoph.) A.C.Sm.

Synonyms
- Litsea magnifolia var samoensis Christoph.

Species of flowering plant

Litsea samoensis, or papaono in Samoan, Is a species of plant in the Lauraceae family. It is endemic to Samoa and is a tree. It is considered vulnerable by the IUCN Red List of threatened species.
