= Calycosia sessilis =

Scientific classification
- Kingdom: Plantae
- Clade: Tracheophytes
- Clade: Angiosperms
- Clade: Eudicots
- Clade: Asterids
- Order: Gentianales
- Family: Rubiaceae
- Genus: Calycosia
- Species: C. sessilis

Binomial name
- Calycosia sessilis A.Gray.

Synonyms
- Psychotria grayana K.Schum.; Psychotria infundibulifera Setch.; Uragoga cyrtandroides Hochr.; Uragoga grayana (K.Schum.) Kuntze

Species of flowering plant

Calycosia sessilis is a species of shrub belonging to the Rubiaceae family. It is found and endemic to Samoa. It features glossy, opposite leaves and small, tubular white-to-cream flowers that bloom intermittently in humid, tropical environments. this plant thrives in rich, well-draining soil and high humidity.

== See also ==
- Samoan tropical moist forests
- List of endemic plants of Samoa
