= Balaka longirostris =

Conservation status
- Least Concern (IUCN 3.1)

Scientific classification
- Kingdom: Plantae
- Clade: Tracheophytes
- Clade: Angiosperms
- Clade: Monocots
- Clade: Commelinids
- Order: Arecales
- Family: Arecaceae
- Genus: Balaka
- Species: B. longirostris

Binomial name
- Balaka longirostris Becc.

Species of palm

Balaka longirostris is a species of flowering plant in the family Arecaceae. It is found only in Fiji.
