= Calycosia =

Scientific classification
- Kingdom: Plantae
- Clade: Tracheophytes
- Clade: Angiosperms
- Clade: Eudicots
- Clade: Asterids
- Order: Gentianales
- Family: Rubiaceae
- Subfamily: Rubioideae
- Tribe: Psychotrieae
- Genus: Calycosia; A.Gray

Species of plant

Calycosia is a genus of flowering plants in the family Rubiaceae. It was described by Asa Gray in 1860. The genus is found in New Guinea, the Solomon Islands, Fiji, Samoa, and the Society Islands.

== Species ==
- Calycosia callithrix A.C.Sm. - Viti Levu
- Calycosia kajewskii Merr. & L.M.Perry - Solomons
- Calycosia lageniformis (Gillespie) A.C.Sm. - Viti Levu
- Calycosia macrocyatha Fosberg - Fiji
- Calycosia mamosei W.N.Takeuchi - Papua New Guinea
- Calycosia petiolata A.Gray - Fiji (Viti Levu, Ovalau)
- Calycosia sessilis A.Gray - Samoa
- Calycosia trichocalyx (Drake) Drake - Tahiti
