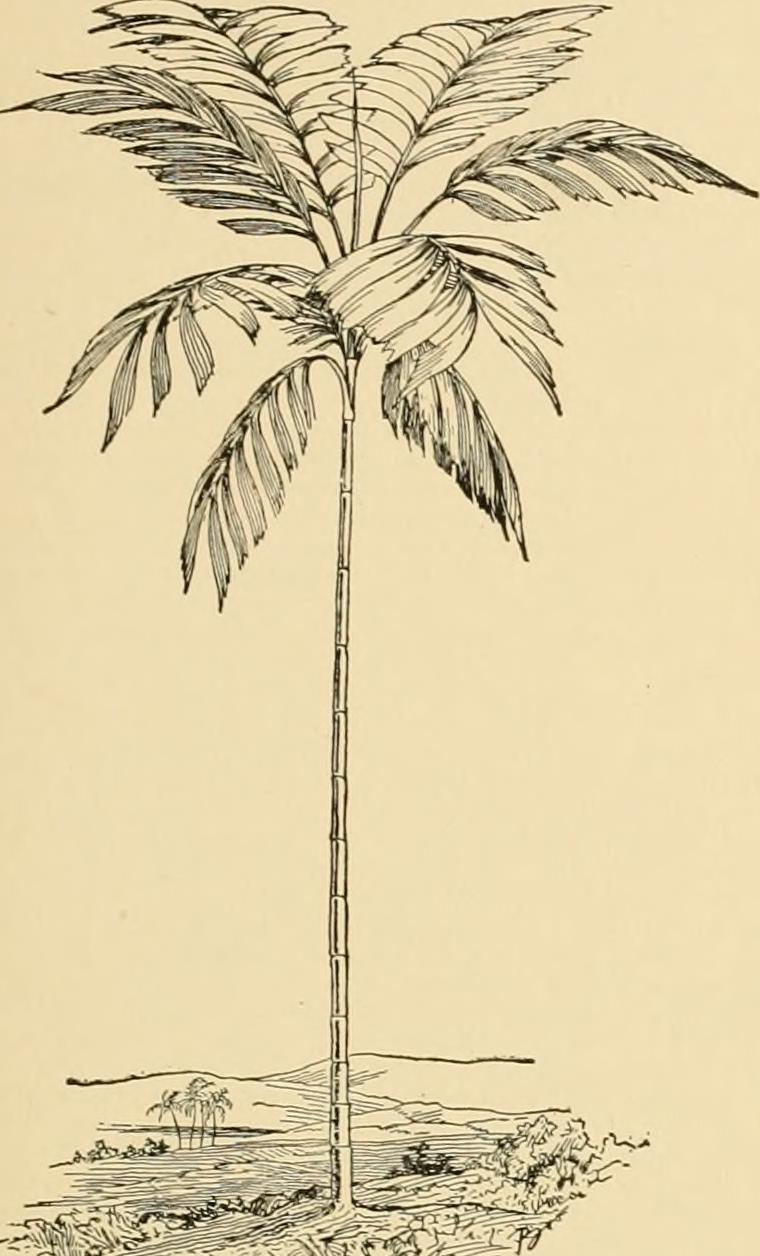
- Illustration of Balaka seemannii

Scientific classification
- Kingdom: Plantae
- Clade: Tracheophytes
- Clade: Angiosperms
- Clade: Monocots
- Clade: Commelinids
- Order: Arecales
- Family: Arecaceae
- Subfamily: Arecoideae
- Tribe: Areceae
- Subtribe: Ptychospermatinae
- Genus: Balaka; Becc.

= Balaka (plant) =

Genus of palms

Balaka is a genus of 11 known species in the palm family, Arecaceae or Palmae. Seven species are native to the islands of Fiji and four to Samoa. The genus was first proposed and published in Annales du Jardin Botanique de Buitenzorg 2: 91. 1885, from two species originally in the genus Ptychosperma (P. perbrevis and P. seemannii).

== Species ==
Accepted species:

- Balaka diffusa Hodel - Fiji
- Balaka insularis Zona & W.J.Baker - Samoa
- Balaka longirostris Becc. - Fiji
- Balaka macrocarpa Burret - Fiji
- Balaka microcarpa Burret - Fiji
- Balaka pauciflora (H.Wendl.) H.E.Moore - Fiji
- Balaka samoensis Becc. - Samoa
- Balaka seemannii (H.Wendl.) Becc. - Fiji
- Balaka siliensis Christoph. - Samoa
- Balaka streptostachys D.Fuller & Dowe - Fiji
- Balaka tahitensis Christoph. - Samoa
