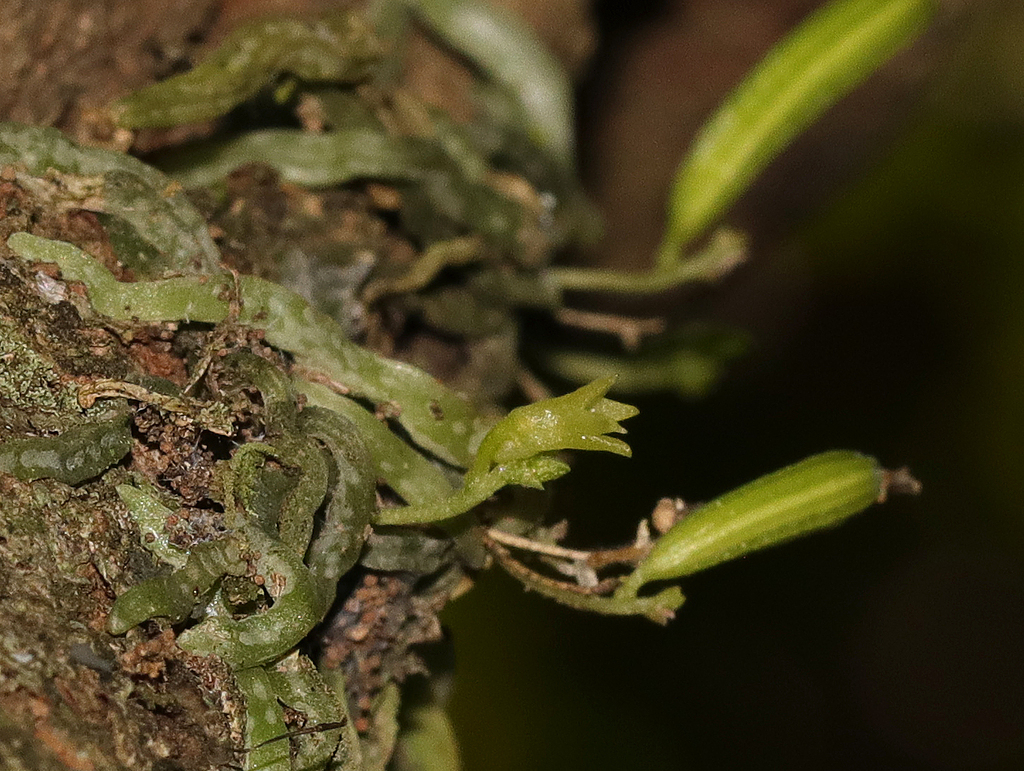

Scientific classification
- Kingdom: Plantae
- Clade: Embryophytes
- Clade: Tracheophytes
- Clade: Spermatophytes
- Clade: Angiosperms
- Clade: Monocots
- Order: Asparagales
- Family: Orchidaceae
- Subfamily: Epidendroideae
- Genus: Taeniophyllum
- Species: T. explanatum

Binomial name
- Taeniophyllum explanatum B.Gray

= Taeniophyllum explanatum =

Species of orchid

Taeniophyllum explanatum, the flat ribbonroot, is an epiphytic orchid, native to Queensland, Australia.

It was first described in 2015 by Bruce Gray, and the specific epithet, explanatum, refers to its flat roots.

== Description ==
Like all species of Taeniophyllum it is effectively leafless with photosynthetic roots. It is an epiphytic plant forming small clumps with 5 to 30 roots, which are flat and dull green. The flower stalk increases in length as flowering progresses, producing up to 30 flowers on the stalk, with only one green flower open at any time. However buds, flowers and capsules may be present at the same time.

== Distribution ==
Taeniophyllum explanatum occurs in Queensland from the Mount Windsor Tableland south to Innisfail, in rainforest and usually on small trees and vines.
