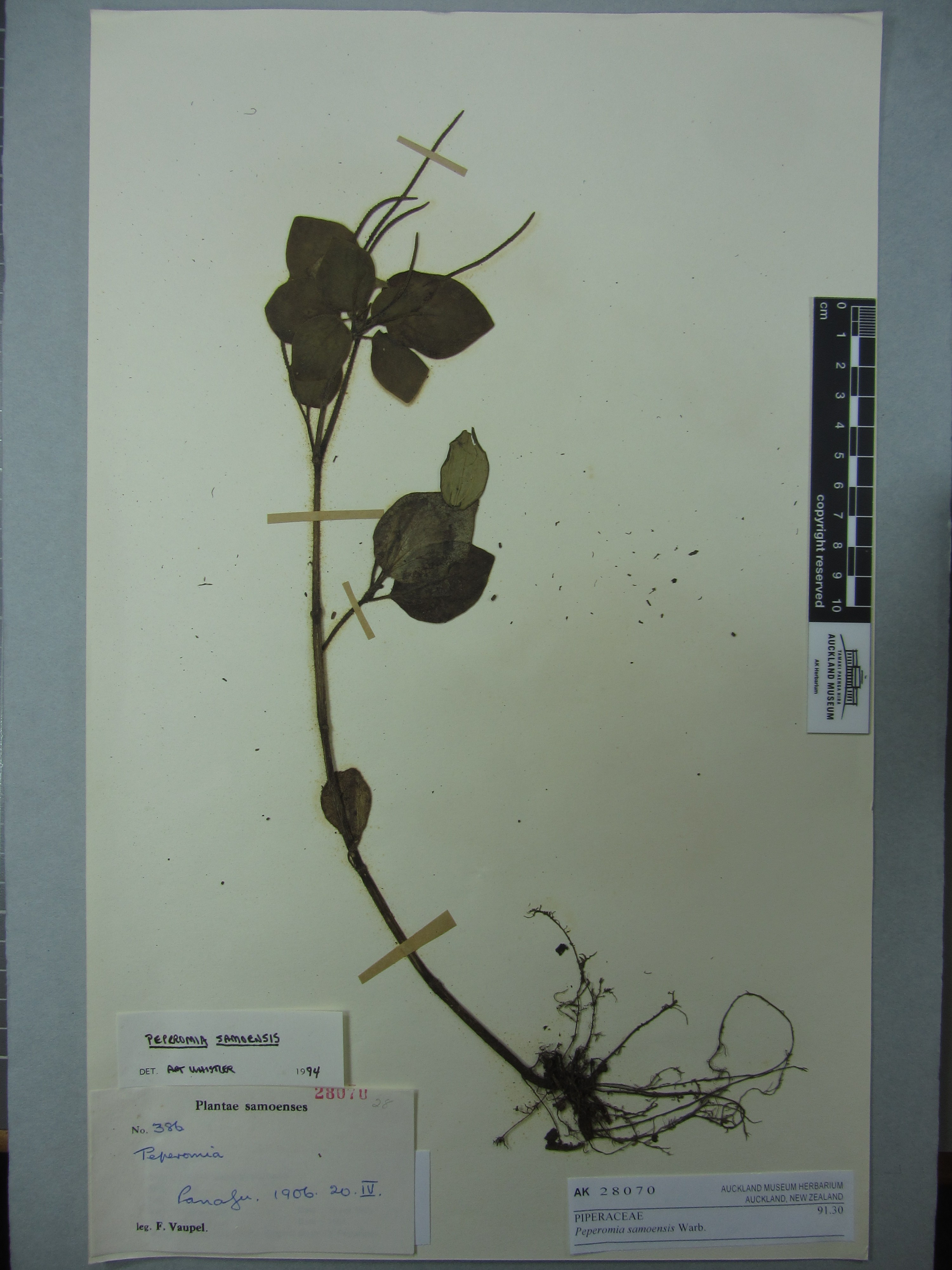
- Herbarium specimen

Scientific classification
- Kingdom: Plantae
- Clade: Embryophytes
- Clade: Tracheophytes
- Clade: Angiosperms
- Clade: Magnoliids
- Order: Piperales
- Family: Piperaceae
- Genus: Peperomia
- Species: P. samoensis

Binomial name
- Peperomia samoensis Warb.

Synonyms
- Peperomia cililimba C.DC.; Peperomia cililimba var. tiavina C.DC.; Peperomia samoensis f. fulvescens C.DC.; Peperomia samoensis var. glabrescens Warb.; Peperomia samoensis var. longifolia Yunck.; Peperomia samoensis var. vaupeliana Yunck.

= Peperomia samoensis =

Species of flowering plant

Peperomia samoensis is a species of flowering plant in the pepper family (Piperaceae). It is endemic to Samoa. It is an epiphytic herb, more often on the ground, locally occasional in the montane forest.

== See also ==
- List of endemic plants of Samoa
- Samoan tropical moist forests
