= Balaka streptostachys =

Conservation status
- Critically Endangered (IUCN 3.1)

Scientific classification
- Kingdom: Plantae
- Clade: Tracheophytes
- Clade: Angiosperms
- Clade: Monocots
- Clade: Commelinids
- Order: Arecales
- Family: Arecaceae
- Genus: Balaka
- Species: B. streptostachys

Binomial name
- Balaka streptostachys D.Fuller & Dowe

Species of palm

Balaka streptostachys is a critically endangered species of flowering plant in the family Arecaceae. It is found only in Fiji. It grows to a height of 4 to 7 metres (13 to 23 ft) and 10 centimetres (3.9 in) in diameter. It is distinct from the other Balaka species because of the twists in its rachilla.

The only known population of this palm is in a stand of approximately 50 trees, on the northern foothills of Mt. Sorolevu on Vanua Levu.

It was first described by D. Fuller & John Leslie Dowe in 1999.
