= Balaka microcarpa =

Conservation status
- Critically Endangered (IUCN 3.1)

Scientific classification
- Kingdom: Plantae
- Clade: Tracheophytes
- Clade: Angiosperms
- Clade: Monocots
- Clade: Commelinids
- Order: Arecales
- Family: Arecaceae
- Genus: Balaka
- Species: B. microcarpa

Binomial name
- Balaka microcarpa Burret

Species of palm

Balaka microcarpa is a species of palm tree. It is endemic to Fiji, where it grows in dense forests. It is threatened by habitat loss.
