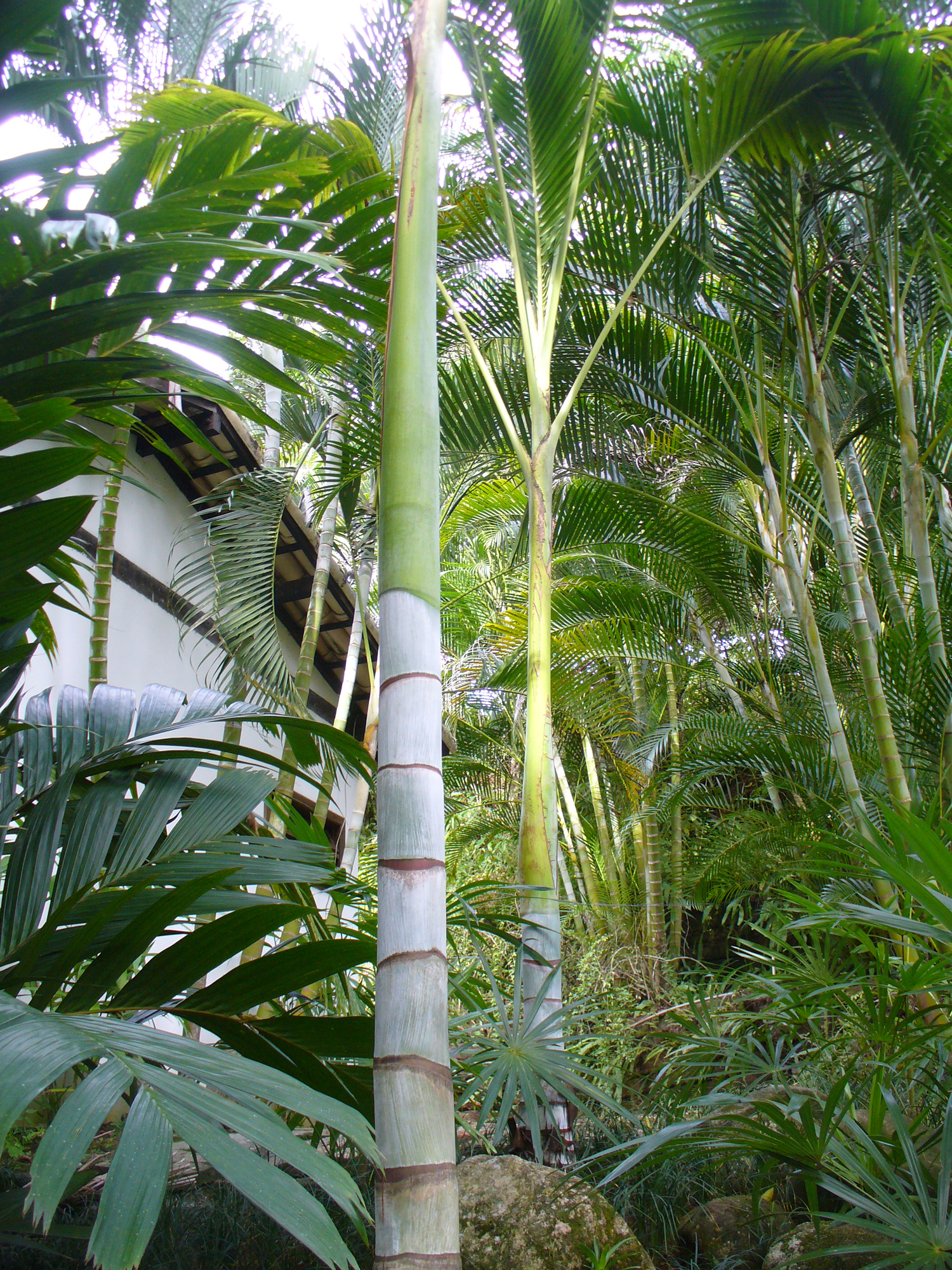
- Clinostigma harlandii

Scientific classification
- Kingdom: Plantae
- Clade: Embryophytes
- Clade: Tracheophytes
- Clade: Spermatophytes
- Clade: Angiosperms
- Clade: Monocots
- Clade: Commelinids
- Order: Arecales
- Family: Arecaceae
- Subfamily: Arecoideae
- Tribe: Areceae
- Genus: Clinostigma; H.Wendl.

Synonyms
- Exorrhiza Becc.; Bentinckiopsi Becc.; Clinostigmopsis Becc.

= Clinostigma =

Genus of palms

Clinostigma is a genus of flowering plants in the Arecaceae (palm) family. It is native to various islands in the western Pacific.

== Species ==
The genus contains the following species:

- Clinostigma carolinense (Becc.) H.E.Moore & Fosberg - Chuuk (Truk) in Micronesia
- Clinostigma collegarum J.Dransf. - Bismarck Archipelago
- Clinostigma gronophyllum H.E.Moore - Solomon Islands
- Clinostigma exorrhizum (H.Wendl.) Becc. - Fiji
- Clinostigma haerestigma H.E.Moore - Solomon Islands
- Clinostigma harlandii Becc. - Vanuatu
- Clinostigma savaiiense Becc. - Samoa
- Clinostigma ponapense (Becc.) H.E.Moore & Fosberg - Pohnpei in Micronesia
- Clinostigma samoense H.Wendl. - Samoa
- Clinostigma savoryanum (Rehder & E.H.Wilson) H.E.Moore & Fosberg - Arrack Tree - Ogasawara-shoto (Bonin Islands)
- Clinostigma warburgii Becc. - Samoa
