= Heliconia laufao =

Scientific classification
- Kingdom: Plantae
- Clade: Tracheophytes
- Clade: Angiosperms
- Clade: Monocots
- Clade: Commelinids
- Order: Zingiberales
- Family: Heliconiaceae
- Genus: Heliconia
- Species: H. laufao

Binomial name
- Heliconia laufao W.J Kress

Species of flowering plant

Heliconia laufao is a species of plant in the Heliconiaceae family. It is endemic to Samoa. The large leaves of Heliconia laufao are traditionally used for wrapping food, covering stone ovens, and sheltering dwellings, while the dried fibres from their petioles and midribs serve as strainers for making coconut cream. The primary pollinator of the plant is the Polynesian wattled honeyeater.

== See also ==
- Flora of Samoa
- List of endemic plants of Samoa
