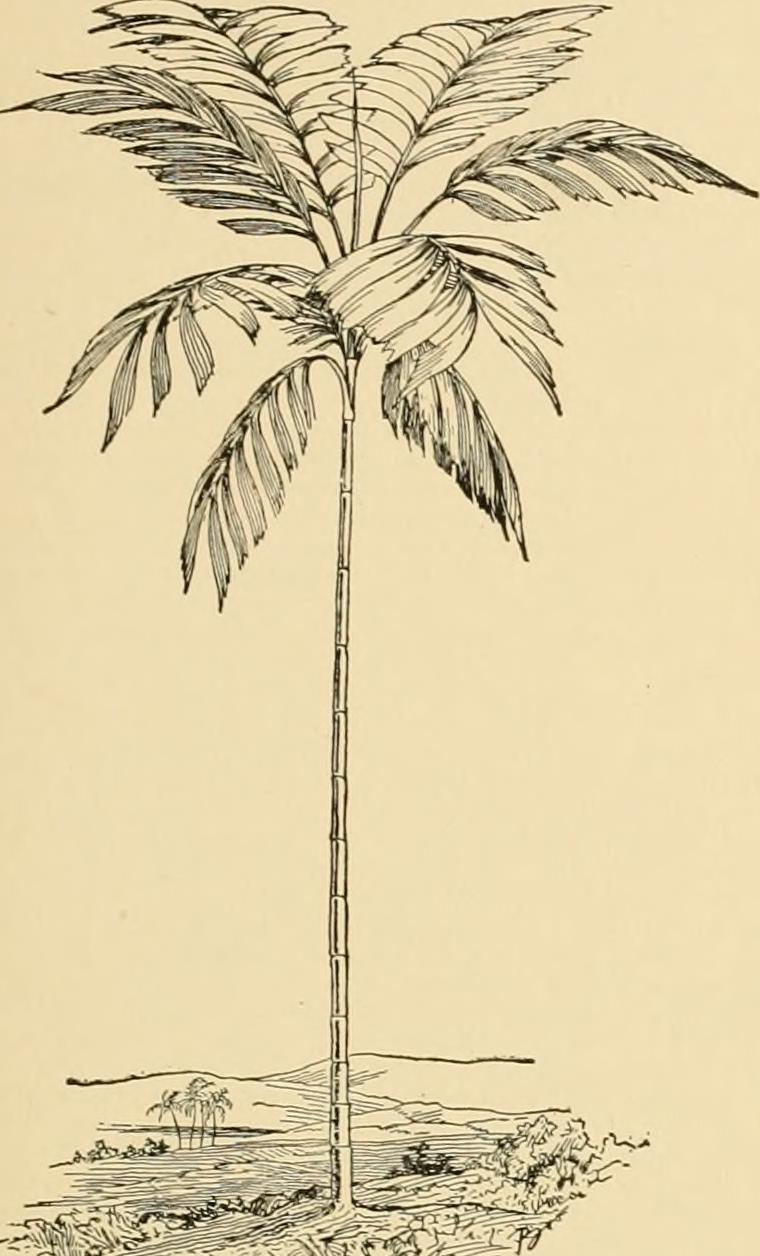
- Illustration of Balaka seemannii

Conservation status
- Least Concern (IUCN 3.1)

Scientific classification
- Kingdom: Plantae
- Clade: Tracheophytes
- Clade: Angiosperms
- Clade: Monocots
- Clade: Commelinids
- Order: Arecales
- Family: Arecaceae
- Genus: Balaka
- Species: B. seemannii

Binomial name
- Balaka seemannii (H.Wendl.) Becc.

Synonyms
- Actinophloeus kerstenianus (Sander) Burret; Balaka cuneata Burret; B. gracilis Burret; B. kersteniana (Sander) Becc. ex Martelli; B. perbrevis (H.Wendl.) Becc.; Drymophloeus kerstenianus Sander ex Burret (nom. inval.); D. seemannii (H.Wendl.) Becc. ex Martelli; Kentia kersteniana Sander; Ptychosperma kerstenianum (Sander) Burret; P. perbreve H.Wendl.; P. seemannii H.Wendl. (basionym); Saguaster perbrevis (H.Wendl.) Kuntze; S. seemannii (H.Wendl.) Kuntze; Vitiphoenix seemannii Becc. ex Martelli (nom. inval.)

= Balaka seemannii =

Species of palm

Balaka seemannii is a species of flowering plant in the family Arecaceae that is endemic to Fiji; growing in mixed forests on Vanua Levu and Taveuni islands.
