= Cyperus whitmeei =

Scientific classification
- Kingdom: Plantae
- Clade: Embryophytes
- Clade: Tracheophytes
- Clade: Spermatophytes
- Clade: Angiosperms
- Clade: Monocots
- Clade: Commelinids
- Order: Poales
- Family: Cyperaceae
- Genus: Cyperus
- Species: C. whitmeei

Binomial name
- Cyperus whitmeei (C.B.Clarke) Kük., 1936

Species of sedge

Cyperus whitmeei is a species of sedge that is endemic to Samoa. Like other plants in the Cyperus genus, it generally has thin stems and grows in damp places. Scientists use physical samples to study its unique seed shapes and leaf structures to understand how it fits into the plant family tree.

== See also ==
- List of Cyperus species
