= Balaka samoensis =

Scientific classification
- Kingdom: Plantae
- Clade: Tracheophytes
- Clade: Angiosperms
- Clade: Monocots
- Clade: Commelinids
- Order: Arecales
- Family: Arecaceae
- Genus: Balaka
- Species: B. samoensis

Binomial name
- Balaka samoensis Becc.

Synonyms
- Vitiphoenix samoensis (Becc.) Burret; Balaka burretiana Christoph.

Species of palm tree

Balaka samoensis is a small palm tree in the Balaka genus that is endemic to two islands in Samoa. It grows in the mountainous interior of its island homes and the species does not have a common name specific to it in Samoan.

== Description ==
Balaka samoensis is a small palm tree that grows to around 5 meters (16 ft) in height. The trunk has a diameter of 5 centimeters (2 in) at breast height and is hairless.

The leaves are measure as much as 1.5 m (4 ft 11 in) long and are pinnately compound, divided into eight to thirteen leaflets. The two leaflets at the end of the leaf a fused at the base into a shape resembling a deep fish-tail. The leaves are attached alternately to the top of the trunk and have a rachis, large central leaf vein, that is covered in somewhat brown scales. The base of the leaf sheathes the trunk, surrounds it, and is 25 to 30 cm long.

The inflorescence is made up of two to four panicles, branching clusters of flowers, that can branch once or twice. The inflorescence might be as long as 60 cm and grows from the trunk from a leaf axil, the joint where it attaches to the trunk. The base of the inflorescence partly sheaths the trunk. All the flowers in a cluster will be unisexual, with the pollen producing flowers towards the end and seed producing flowers towards the base.

The flowers have three small sepals, only about 3 millimeters long, and three white petals 6 to 7 mm long. The petals are bent backwards at maturity. The ovary is hardly developed in pollen producing flowers and the stamens are barely developed staminodes in seed producing flowers.

The fruit is a red drupe, egg shaped to ellipsoid, measuring between 1.8 and 2.4 cm long. It is likely that flowering and fruiting can happen in any part of the year.

The fishtail shape of the end of the leaves is one of the distinging characteristics of this species along with the size of its fruits and the size of the trees.

== Taxonomy ==
Balaka samoensis was scientifically described and named by Odoardo Beccari in 1914. It is part of the genus Balaka in the family Arecaceae. It has two botanical synonyms, a 1935 attempt to move it to the genus Vitiphoenix by Karl Ewald Maximilian Burret and a mistaken heterotypic synonym created by Erling Christophersen in the same year.

=== Names ===
In the Samoan language these trees are called māniuniu, a name used for all palms in the both Balaka and Drymophloeus.

== Range and habitat ==
Balaka samoensis is endemic to the islands of Savai'i and 'Upolu, the two largest in Samoa. It grows in the mountain forests between 280 and 800 meters in elevation. There it is an uncommon or occasional part of the forests. It is somewhat more often collected on Savai'i than on 'Upolu. It is an understory plant, growing beneath the canopy of other trees.

Though there has not been a risk formal risk assessment for the species the botanist Donald R. Hodel thought that at worst it would be vulnerable by the IUCN criteria and more likely least concern or near threatened. The species is widespread in its range and regenerates, though its habitat is being reduced by development on the islands.

== Uses ==
The bast, fibers from the frond sheath, from species in this genus were formerly used as caulking for the seams of large canoes. The midribs of fronds were also used for roofing houses.
