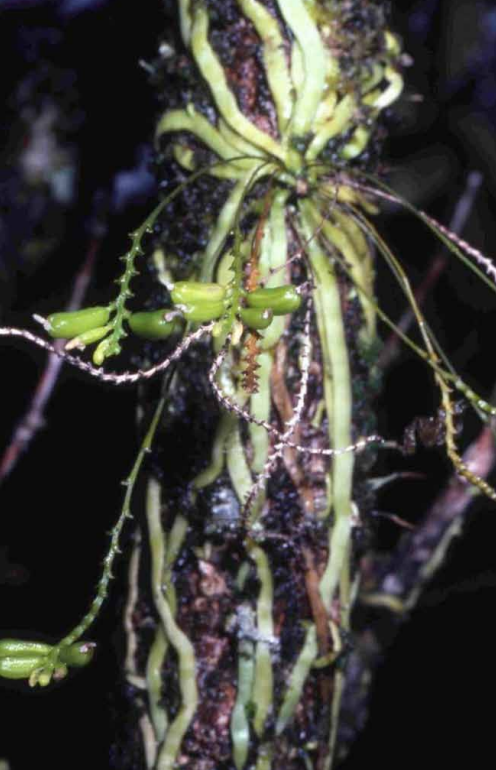

Scientific classification
- Kingdom: Plantae
- Clade: Embryophytes
- Clade: Tracheophytes
- Clade: Angiosperms
- Clade: Monocots
- Order: Asparagales
- Family: Orchidaceae
- Subfamily: Epidendroideae
- Genus: Taeniophyllum
- Species: T. savaiiense

Binomial name
- Taeniophyllum savaiiense P.J.Cribb & Whistler

= Taeniophyllum savaiiense =

Species of flowering plant

Taeniophyllum savaiiense is a species of an epiphyte orchid. This plant is endemic to Samoa, most specifically Savaiʻi. It grows on tree trunks instead of in the soil. It has no leaves at all. Instead, it uses its green, ribbon-like roots to catch sunlight and make its food. It grows small, wiry stems that carry many tiny white or cream-coloured flowers.

== See also ==
- Flora of Samoa
- Samoan tropical moist forests
