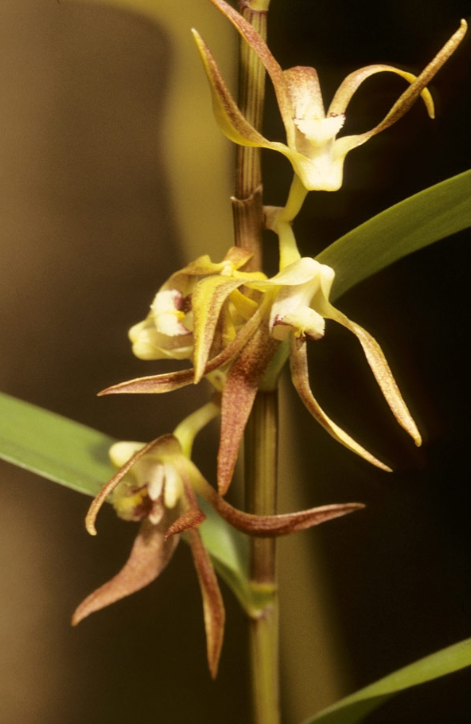

Scientific classification
- Kingdom: Plantae
- Clade: Tracheophytes
- Clade: Angiosperms
- Clade: Monocots
- Order: Asparagales
- Family: Orchidaceae
- Subfamily: Epidendroideae
- Genus: Dendrobium
- Species: D. lepidochilum

Binomial name
- Dendrobium lepidochilum Kraenzl.

Synonyms
- Grastidium lepidochilum (Kraenzl.) M.A.Clem. & D.L.Jones

= Dendrobium lepidochilum =

Species of flowering plant

Dendrobium lepidochilum is a species of plant belonging to the family Orchidaceae. It is endemic to Samoa. it is found in Samoa in swampy and montane forests at elevations of 200 to 400 meters as a large sized, hot growing epiphyte with clustered, pendent to erect, leafy stems carrying coriaceous, oblong-ovate, rounded and apically unequally bilobed leaves that blooms in the late winter and early spring on very short, 2 flowered inflorescence.

== See also ==
Flora of Samoa
