= Cinnamomum elegans =

Scientific classification
- Kingdom: Plantae
- Clade: Embryophytes
- Clade: Tracheophytes
- Clade: Angiosperms
- Clade: Magnoliids
- Order: Laurales
- Family: Lauraceae
- Genus: Cinnamomum
- Species: C. elegans

Binomial name
- Cinnamomum elegans Reinecke 1898

Species of plant

Cinnamomum elegans is a species of plants belonging to the laurel family, Lauraceae, endemic to Samoa
