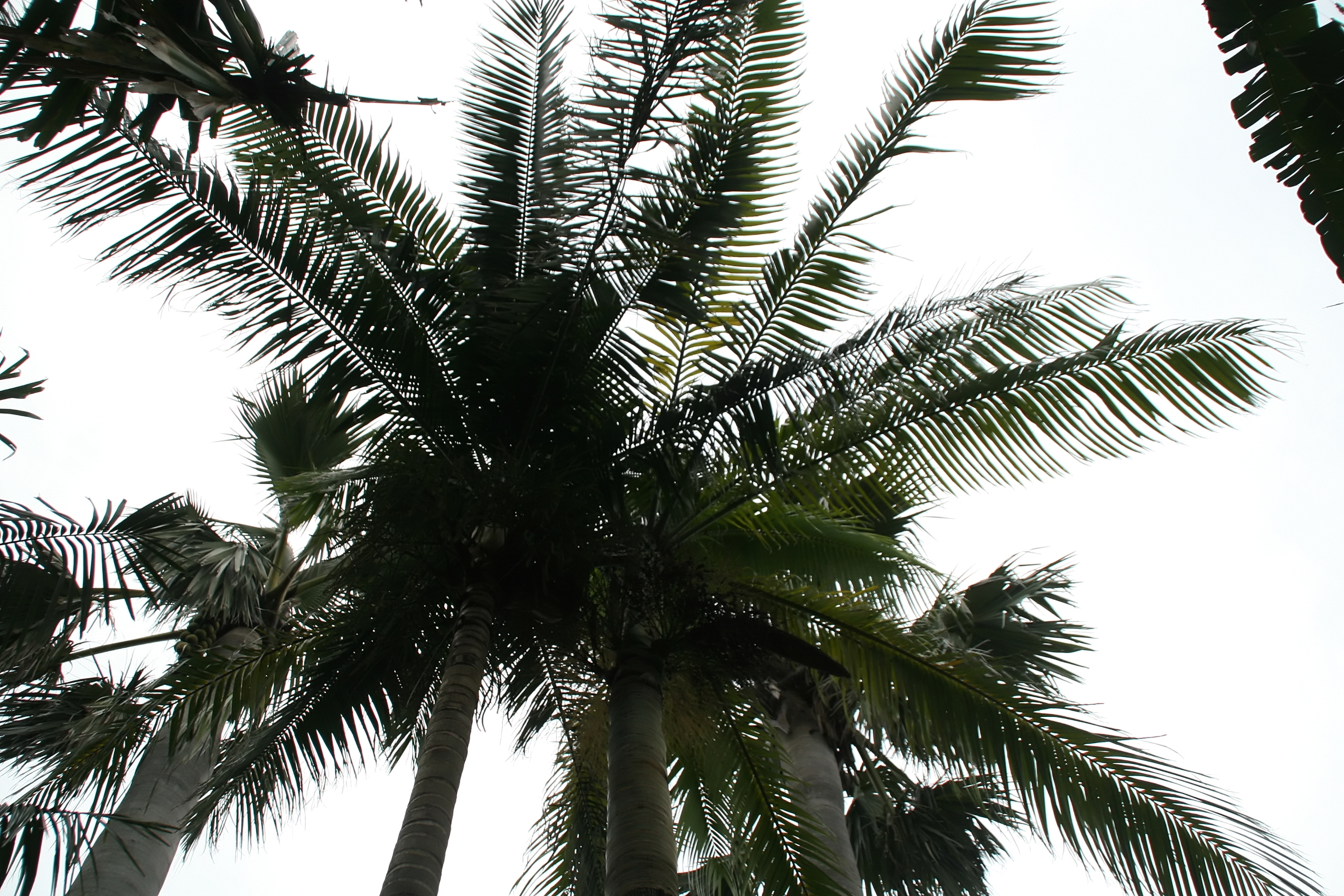

Conservation status
- Endangered (IUCN 3.1)

Scientific classification
- Kingdom: Plantae
- Clade: Embryophytes
- Clade: Tracheophytes
- Clade: Spermatophytes
- Clade: Angiosperms
- Clade: Monocots
- Clade: Commelinids
- Order: Arecales
- Family: Arecaceae
- Genus: Clinostigma
- Species: C. samoense

Binomial name
- Clinostigma samoense H.Wendl.

Synonyms
- Clinostigma onchorhynchum Becc.; Clinostigma powellianum Becc.; Cyphokentia samoensis (H.Wendl.) Warb.; Exorrhiza onchorhyncha (Becc.) Burret; Lepidorrhachis onchorhyncha Becc. ex Martelli

= Clinostigma samoense =

Species of palm

Clinostigma samoense is a species of flowering plant in the family Arecaceae. It is a palm tree endemic to the island of 'Upolu in Samoa. It is native to foothill and montane rain forest from 510 to 1,000 m (1,670 to 3,280 ft) elevation, most abundantly around Lake Lanoto‘o from 510 to 750 m (1,670 to 2,460 ft) elevation, and less commonly on Mt. Fito around 1,000 m (3,300 ft) elevation. It is threatened by habitat loss.
