= Karl Rechinger =

Austrian botanist (1867–1952)

Karl Rechinger (9 April 1867 – 29 November 1952) was an Austrian botanist born in Vienna. He was the father of botanist Karl Heinz Rechinger (1906-1998).

He studied at the University of Vienna, earning his doctorate in 1893. Afterwards he served as a demonstrator, followed by work as an assistant at the university botanical garden. Beginning in 1902 he worked at various functions at the Naturhistorisches Museum in Vienna, and from 1918 onward, he served as a curator of the botany department.

In 1905, with his wife Lily Rechinger-Favarger (1880-1973), he participated on an expedition to Oceania, where he performed botanical research in Samoa, the Solomon Islands and New Guinea. As a result of the journey he published the following two works:

- Deutsch Neu-Guinea. Streifzüge in Deutsch Neu-Guinea and auf den Salomons-Inseln, (1908).
- Botanische and zoologische Ergebnisse einer wissenschaftlichen Forschungsreise nach den Samoa-Inseln, dem Neuguinea-Archipel and den Salomons-Inseln, (1908–15).

== Eponymy ==
The plant species Alpinia rechingeri, Areca rechingeriana, Balaka rechingeriana, Berberis rechingeri, Carduus rechingeri, Carex rechingeri, Celsia rechingeri, Euphrasia rechingeri, Galeopsis rechingeri, Guillainia rechingeri, Laportea rechingeri, Lycianthes rechingeri, Mariscus rechingeri, Masdevallia rechinergiana, Melolhria rechingeri, Oncidium rechingerianum, Ophrys rechingeri, Pandanus rechingerii, Pelasites rechingeri, Piper rechingeri, Primula rechingeri, Schomburgkia rechingerana, Solanum rechingeri, Syzygium rechingeri, Tylophora rechingeri and Wedelia rechingeriana are named after him.
