= Balaka tahitensis =

Scientific classification
- Kingdom: Plantae
- Clade: Tracheophytes
- Clade: Angiosperms
- Clade: Monocots
- Clade: Commelinids
- Order: Arecales
- Family: Arecaceae
- Genus: Balaka
- Species: B. tahitensis

Binomial name
- Balaka tahitensis Becc.

Synonyms
- Balaka brachychlamys (Burret); Balaka minuta (Burret); Balaka polyclada (Burret); Balaka rechingeriana (Burret); Balaka reineckei (Warb.) (Burret); Balaka tuasivica (Christoph.); Drymophloeus minutus (Rech.); Drymophloeus reineckei (Warb.); Ptychosperma tahitensis (H.Wendl.); Saguaster tahitensis (H.Wendl.) (Kuntze); Vitiphoenix minuta (Rech.) (Burret); Vitiphoenix polyclada (Burret)

Species of palm

Balaka tahitensis is a palm, a species of flowering plant in the family Arecaceae. It is endemic to Samoa.

== Distribution ==
Balaka tahitensis is found on Upolu and Savai'i, in understory forest to about 800m elevation
