= Erling Christophersen =

Norwegian botanist, geographer and diplomat

Erling Christophersen (April 17, 1898 – November 9, 1994) was a Norwegian botanist, geographer and diplomat. He participated in and led several notable scientific expeditions in the 20th century, including the fifth Tanager Expedition (1924) to Nīhoa and Necker Island and the Norwegian Scientific Expedition to Tristan da Cunha (1937–1938).

== Early life ==
Christophersen was born in Christiania, Norway (now known as Oslo) in 1898. He attended the University of Christiania from 1918 to 1921, and received his Ph.D. from Yale University in 1924. Christophersen's dissertation, "Soil reaction and plant distribution in the Sylene National Park, Norway", focused on the art and science of applied forest ecology, or silviculture, of alpine plants in Norway.

== Career ==
Christophersen was a professor of botany at the University of Hawaiʻi at Mānoa from 1929 to 1932. He was instrumental in developing and leading the scientific expedition to Tristan da Cunha from 1937 to 1938. His book, Tristan da Cunha, the lonely island (1938), is an account of the expedition.

== Selected publications ==
- Christophersen, Erling (1925). "Soil Reaction and Plant Distribution in the Sylene National Park, Norway". Trans. Conn. Acad. Sci. 27. Connecticut academy of arts and sciences: 471–577.
- Christophersen, Erling; Caum, Edward L. (1931-07-01). Vascular plants of the Leeward Islands, Hawaii. Bernice P. Bishop Museum Bulletin No. 81; Tanager Expedition Publication No. 7. Honolulu, Hawaiʻi: Bishop Museum Press.
- "Vascular plants of Johnston and Wake Islands" (1931)
- "Plants of Gough Islands" (1934)
- "Flowering plants of Samoa" (1935)
- Tristan da Cunha, the Lonely Isle (1938)

== See also ==
- Amaranthus brownii
- Diospyros christophersenii
