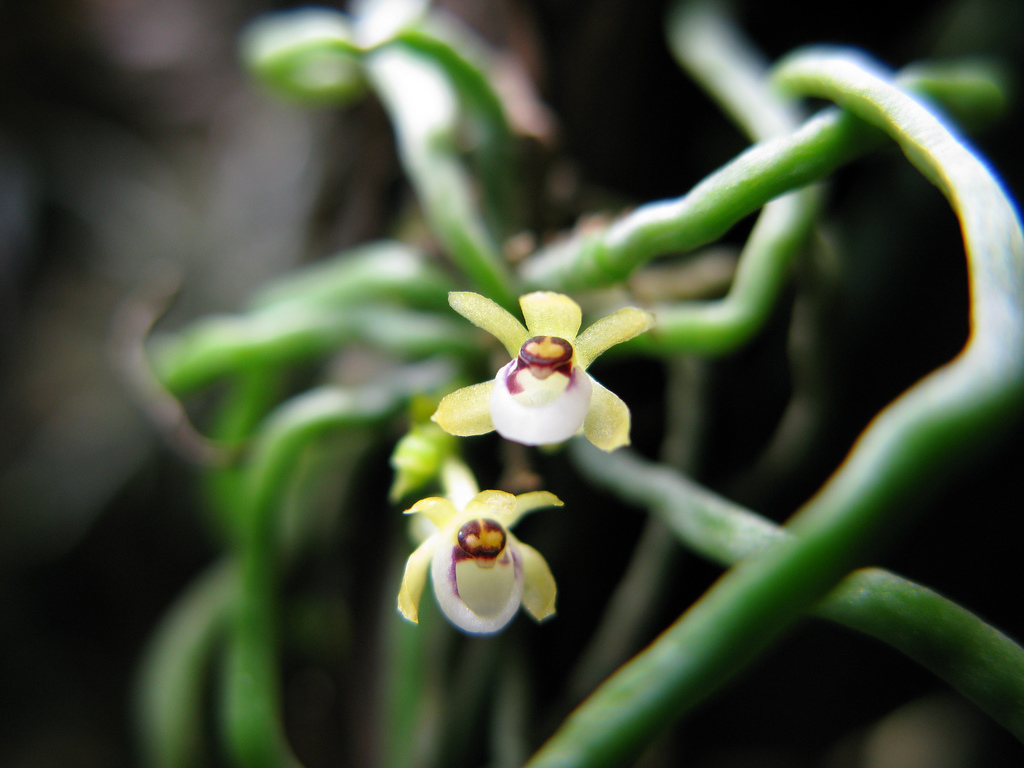
- Taeniophyllum biocellatum

Scientific classification
- Kingdom: Plantae
- Clade: Embryophytes
- Clade: Tracheophytes
- Clade: Spermatophytes
- Clade: Angiosperms
- Clade: Monocots
- Order: Asparagales
- Family: Orchidaceae
- Subfamily: Epidendroideae
- Tribe: Vandeae
- Subtribe: Aeridinae
- Genus: Taeniophyllum; Blume

Species
- See List of Taeniophyllum species

Diversity
- 240 species

= Taeniophyllum =

Genus of orchids

Taeniophyllum, commonly known as ribbon roots or 带叶兰属 (dai ye lan shu) is a genus of about 240 species of epiphytic or lithophytic plants from the orchid family, Orchidaceae. Plants in this genus are more or less leafless with a very short stem and roots that are often flat, green and photosynthetic. The flowers are small, short-lived, flat or tube-shaped and arranged on short, thin flowering stems. Orchids in this genus are found in Africa, tropical and subtropical Asia, New Guinea, Australia and some Western Pacific Islands. It is extinct in Malawi.

== Description ==
Orchids in the genus Taeniophyllum are small epiphytic or lithophytic monopodial herbs, with the leaves reduced to tiny overlapping, brownish scales. There is a short stem with spreading grey or greenish roots which are photosynthetic, mainly in the rainy season. In the absence of stomata, the photosynthetic roots will use specialized aeration cells to absorb nocturnal CO_{2}. The flowers are small, arranged on a short flowering stem and only last for about a day. The sepals and petals are either free and spread widely apart from each other or joined near the base to form a tube. The labellum sometimes has three lobes and usually has a sac-like spur.

== Taxonomy and naming ==
The genus Taeniophyllum was first formally described in 1825 by Carl Ludwig Blume who published the description in Bijdragen tot de Flora van Nederlandsch Indie. The name Taeniophyllum is derived from the Ancient Greek words tainia meaning "ribbon", "fillet", "band", "stripe" or "tapeworm" and phyllon meaning "leaf".

== Distribution ==
Plants in this genus are found in Africa from Ghana to Zimbabwe, in tropical and subtropical Asia including India, China, Japan and Korea, in Southeast Asia including Thailand, Vietnam and Indonesia, in New Guinea, Australia and some Pacific islands including Fiji, New Caledonia and Tonga.

== Species ==
See List of Taeniophyllum species

== See also ==
- List of Orchidaceae genera
