= List of Cyrtandra species =

As of 6 September 2026, the following 700 species and 41 hybrids in the genus Cyrtandra are accepted by Plants of the World Online. Many of the species are narrow endemics on islands (and sky islands) in the Malesia and Oceania regions.

== A ==
- Cyrtandra aclada Merr.
- Cyrtandra acutangula Seem.
- Cyrtandra acutiserrata (Schltr.) S.S.Ying
- Cyrtandra adnata B.L.Burtt
- Cyrtandra aeruginosa Quisumb.
- Cyrtandra agrihanensis Ohba
- Cyrtandra agusanensis Elmer
- Cyrtandra albertisii C.B.Clarke
- Cyrtandra albibracteata B.L.Burtt
- Cyrtandra albiflora Karton. & H.J.Atkins
- Cyrtandra aloisiana A.C.Sm.
- Cyrtandra alvarezii Merr.
- Cyrtandra amicta A.C.Sm.
- Cyrtandra ammitophila B.L.Burtt
- Cyrtandra ampla C.B.Clarke
- Cyrtandra amplifolia Schltr.
- Cyrtandra andersonii B.L.Burtt
- Cyrtandra aneiteensis C.B.Clarke
- Cyrtandra angularis Elmer
- Cyrtandra angustielliptica Hilliard & B.L.Burtt
- Cyrtandra angustivenosa Rech.
- Cyrtandra anisophylla C.B.Clarke
- Cyrtandra anisopoda Kraenzl.
- Cyrtandra anthropophagorum Seem. ex A.Gray
- Cyrtandra antoniana Elmer
- Cyrtandra antuana B.L.Burtt
- Cyrtandra apaensis B.L.Burtt
- Cyrtandra apiculata C.B.Clarke
- Cyrtandra apoensis Elmer
- Cyrtandra arachnoidea Hilliard & B.L.Burtt
- Cyrtandra arborescens Blume
- Cyrtandra areolata (Stapf) B.L.Burtt
- Cyrtandra arfakensis Schltr.
- Cyrtandra argentata B.L.Burtt
- Cyrtandra argentii Olivar, H.J.Atkins & Muellner
- Cyrtandra asikii Hilliard & B.L.Burtt
- Cyrtandra atherocalyx G.W.Gillett
- Cyrtandra athrocarpa B.L.Burtt
- Cyrtandra atrichoides Hilliard & B.L.Burtt
- Cyrtandra atrichos C.B.Clarke
- Cyrtandra atropurpurea Merr.
- Cyrtandra attenuata Elmer
- Cyrtandra augusti Schltr.
- Cyrtandra aundensis P.Royen
- Cyrtandra aurantiaca B.L.Burtt
- Cyrtandra aurantiicarpa G.W.Gillett
- Cyrtandra aurea Jack
- Cyrtandra aureosericea Kaneh. & Hatus.
- Cyrtandra aureotincta Bramley & Cronk
- Cyrtandra auriculata C.B.Clarke
- Cyrtandra axillantha K.Schum.
- Cyrtandra axillaris C.B.Clarke

== B ==
- Cyrtandra bacanii Olivar & Muellner
- Cyrtandra baileyi F.Muell.
- Cyrtandra balgooyi H.J.Atkins & Karton.
- Cyrtandra banyingii Hilliard & B.L.Burtt
- Cyrtandra barbata Ridl.
- Cyrtandra barnesii Merr.
- Cyrtandra basiflora C.B.Clarke
- Cyrtandra bataanensis Kraenzl.
- Cyrtandra bataviensis C.B.Clarke
- Cyrtandra beamanii B.L.Burtt
- Cyrtandra beccarii C.B.Clarke
- Cyrtandra begonioides Schltr.
- Cyrtandra behrmanniana Schltr.
- Cyrtandra benaratica B.L.Burtt
- Cyrtandra benguetiana Kraenzl.
- Cyrtandra bicolor Jack
- Cyrtandra bidwillii C.B.Clarke
- Cyrtandra biflora J.R.Forst. & G.Forst.
- Cyrtandra biserrata Hillebr.
- Cyrtandra bismarckiensis Schltr.
- Cyrtandra boliohutensis Karton. & H.J.Atkins
- Cyrtandra bracheia B.L.Burtt
- Cyrtandra bracteata Warb.
- Cyrtandra brevicaulis Ridl.
- Cyrtandra breviflora G.W.Gillett
- Cyrtandra brevisetosa Hilliard & B.L.Burtt
- Cyrtandra brownii K.Schum.
- Cyrtandra bruteliana Koord.
- Cyrtandra bryophila B.L.Burtt
- Cyrtandra buergersiana Schltr.
- Cyrtandra bullata Schltr.
- Cyrtandra bullifolia B.L.Burtt
- Cyrtandra bungahijau Bramley & H.J.Atkins
- Cyrtandra burbidgei C.B.Clarke
- Cyrtandra burleyana B.L.Burtt
- Cyrtandra burttii N.P.Balakr.

== C ==
- Cyrtandra calciphila B.L.Burtt
- Cyrtandra callicarpifolia Elmer
- Cyrtandra calpidicarpa (Rock) H.St.John & Storey
- Cyrtandra calycina Benth.
- Cyrtandra calyptribracteata Bakh.f.
- Cyrtandra campanulata Reinecke
- Cyrtandra capitellata C.B.Clarke
- Cyrtandra castatea Merr.
- Cyrtandra caudata Kaneh. & Hatus.
- Cyrtandra cauliflora Merr.
- Cyrtandra cephalophora Gillespie
- Cyrtandra ceratocalyx K.Schum.
- Cyrtandra cerea Kraenzl.
- Cyrtandra chaiana B.L.Burtt
- Cyrtandra chalcodea Diels
- Cyrtandra chippendalei Horne ex C.B.Clarke
- Cyrtandra chiritoides Kraenzl.
- Cyrtandra chlamydocalyx Schltr.
- Cyrtandra chlorantha A.C.Sm.
- Cyrtandra chrysalabastrum K.Schum.
- Cyrtandra chrysea C.B.Clarke
- Cyrtandra ciliata Seem.
- Cyrtandra clarkei Stapf
- Cyrtandra cleopatrae H.J.Atkins & Cronk
- Cyrtandra coacta Hilliard & B.L.Burtt
- Cyrtandra coccinea Blume
- Cyrtandra coleoides Seem.
- Cyrtandra cominsii Hemsl.
- Cyrtandra comocarpa G.W.Gillett
- Cyrtandra compressa C.B.Clarke
- Cyrtandra confertiflora (Wawra) C.B.Clarke
- Cyrtandra confusa Schltr.
- Cyrtandra congestiflora B.L.Burtt
- Cyrtandra connata Nadeaud
- Cyrtandra consimilis S.Moore
- Cyrtandra constricta Elmer
- Cyrtandra cordifolia Gaudich.
- Cyrtandra corniculata B.L.Burtt
- Cyrtandra crenata H.St.John & Storey
- Cyrtandra cretacea Kraenzl.
- Cyrtandra crockerella Hilliard
- Cyrtandra crockeriana Hilliard & B.L.Burtt
- Cyrtandra cryptantha Schltr.
- Cyrtandra cumingii C.B.Clarke
- Cyrtandra cuneata Blume
- Cyrtandra cuprea B.L.Burtt
- Cyrtandra cupulata Ridl.
- Cyrtandra cyaneoides Rock
- Cyrtandra cyathibracteata G.W.Gillett
- Cyrtandra cyclopum Kraenzl.
- Cyrtandra cylindrocalyx G.W.Gillett
- Cyrtandra cymosa J.R.Forst. & G.Forst.

== D-E ==
- Cyrtandra dallasensis B.L.Burtt
- Cyrtandra dasymallos Hilliard & B.L.Burtt
- Cyrtandra davaoensis Elmer
- Cyrtandra debilis Kraenzl.
- Cyrtandra decipiens Hilliard & B.L.Burtt
- Cyrtandra decurrens de Vriese
- Cyrtandra decussata Elmer
- Cyrtandra deinandra B.L.Burtt
- Cyrtandra denhamii Seem.
- Cyrtandra dentata H.St.John & Storey
- Cyrtandra detzneriana Schltr.
- Cyrtandra digitaliflora B.L.Burtt
- Cyrtandra dilatata C.B.Clarke
- Cyrtandra dinocalyx G.W.Gillett
- Cyrtandra diplotricha B.L.Burtt
- Cyrtandra dispar DC.
- Cyrtandra disparifolia Quisumb.
- Cyrtandra disparoides B.L.Burtt
- Cyrtandra dissimilis C.B.Clarke
- Cyrtandra disticha Lauterb.
- Cyrtandra djamuensis (Schltr.) S.S.Ying
- Cyrtandra dolichocalyx Schltr.
- Cyrtandra dolichocarpa A.Gray
- Cyrtandra dolichopoda B.L.Burtt
- Cyrtandra dorytricha Hilliard & B.L.Burtt
- Cyrtandra dubiosa Kuntze
- Cyrtandra dulitiana Hilliard
- Cyrtandra edanoi Olivar & Pelser
- Cyrtandra efatensis Guillaumin
- Cyrtandra elata Schltr.
- Cyrtandra elatostemoides Elmer
- Cyrtandra elbertii Bakh.f.
- Cyrtandra elegans Schltr.
- Cyrtandra elizabethae H.St.John
- Cyrtandra elmeri Merr.
- Cyrtandra eminens C.B.Clarke
- Cyrtandra engleri Koord.
- Cyrtandra erectiloba G.W.Gillett
- Cyrtandra erectipila B.L.Burtt
- Cyrtandra eriantha Schltr.
- Cyrtandra eriophylla S.Moore
- Cyrtandra erythrotricha B.L.Burtt
- Cyrtandra esothrix A.C.Sm.
- Cyrtandra etappenbergii S.S.Ying
- Cyrtandra eximia C.B.Clarke
- Cyrtandra exserta K.Schum.
- Cyrtandra externata S.Moore

== F-G ==
- Cyrtandra falcata Ridl.
- Cyrtandra falcifolia C.B.Clarke
- Cyrtandra farinosa C.B.Clarke
- Cyrtandra fasciata H.J.Atkins
- Cyrtandra fawcettii R.Kr.Singh, Deroliya & Sanjeet Kumar
- Cyrtandra feaniana F.Br.
- Cyrtandra fenestrata C.B.Clarke
- Cyrtandra ferripilosa H.St.John
- Cyrtandra ferruginea Merr.
- Cyrtandra filibracteata B.L.Burtt
- Cyrtandra filipes Hillebr.
- Cyrtandra filisecta B.L.Burtt
- Cyrtandra finisterrae (Schltr.) S.S.Ying
- Cyrtandra flabellifolia S.Moore
- Cyrtandra flabelligera Ridl.
- Cyrtandra flavescens Blume
- Cyrtandra flavomaculata H.J.Atkins & Karton.
- Cyrtandra flexiramea Schltr.
- Cyrtandra floccosa R.Bone & H.J.Atkins
- Cyrtandra floribunda K.Schum.
- Cyrtandra foliosa S.Moore
- Cyrtandra foveolata Kraenzl.
- Cyrtandra frutescens Jack
- Cyrtandra fulvisericea Bramley
- Cyrtandra fulvovillosa Rech.
- Cyrtandra funkii Reinecke
- Cyrtandra fusconervia Merr.
- Cyrtandra fuscovellea K.Schum.
- Cyrtandra fuscovenosa Hilliard & B.L.Burtt
- Cyrtandra futunae Kraenzl.
- Cyrtandra gambutensis Karton. & H.J.Atkins
- Cyrtandra garnotiana Gaudich.
- Cyrtandra geantha Kraenzl.
- Cyrtandra gebirgswaldensis S.S.Ying
- Cyrtandra geesinkiana B.L.Burtt
- Cyrtandra geminata Reinecke
- Cyrtandra geminiflora Nadeaud
- Cyrtandra geocarpa Koord.
- Cyrtandra gibbsiae S.Moore
- Cyrtandra giffardii Rock
- Cyrtandra gillettiana B.L.Burtt
- Cyrtandra gimlettii Ridl.
- Cyrtandra gitingensis Elmer
- Cyrtandra gjellerupii Lauterb.
- Cyrtandra glabra Banks ex C.F.Gaertn.
- Cyrtandra glabrifolia Merr.
- Cyrtandra glabrilimba Quisumb.
- Cyrtandra gorontaloensis H.J.Atkins
- Cyrtandra gorumensis Schltr.
- Cyrtandra gracilenta Kraenzl.
- Cyrtandra gracilis Hillebr. ex C.B.Clarke
- Cyrtandra graeffei C.B.Clarke
- Cyrtandra grandibracteata G.W.Gillett
- Cyrtandra grandiflora Gaudich.
- Cyrtandra grandifolia Elmer
- Cyrtandra grandis Blume
- Cyrtandra grayana Hillebr.
- Cyrtandra grayi C.B.Clarke
- Cyrtandra gregoryi M.A.Johnson
- Cyrtandra guerkeana Lauterb.

== H-I ==
- Cyrtandra halawensis Rock
- Cyrtandra hansenii B.L.Burtt
- Cyrtandra hapalantha C.B.Clarke
- Cyrtandra harveyi Seem.
- Cyrtandra hashimotoi Rock
- Cyrtandra hawaiensis C.B.Clarke
- Cyrtandra hedraiantha Schltr.
- Cyrtandra heineana Schltr.
- Cyrtandra heinrichii H.St.John
- Cyrtandra heintzelmaniana G.W.Gillett
- Cyrtandra hekensis Karton. & H.J.Atkins
- Cyrtandra hellwigii Warb.
- Cyrtandra hematos H.St.John
- Cyrtandra hendrianii Karton. & H.J.Atkins
- Cyrtandra herbacea G.W.Gillett
- Cyrtandra heteronema G.W.Gillett
- Cyrtandra heterophylla de Vriese
- Cyrtandra hiranoi B.L.Burtt
- Cyrtandra hirsuta Jack
- Cyrtandra hirta Schltr.
- Cyrtandra hirtigera H.J.Atkins & Cronk
- Cyrtandra hispida M.A.Johnson
- Cyrtandra hispidissima Schltr.
- Cyrtandra hispidula Karton. & H.J.Atkins
- Cyrtandra holodasys Miq.
- Cyrtandra hololeuca B.L.Burtt
- Cyrtandra homoplastica S.Moore
- Cyrtandra horizontalis B.L.Burtt
- Cyrtandra hornei C.B.Clarke
- Cyrtandra hoseana B.L.Burtt
- Cyrtandra hottae B.L.Burtt
- Cyrtandra humilis Blume
- Cyrtandra hunsteinspitzensis S.S.Ying
- Cyrtandra hypochrysea Kraenzl.
- Cyrtandra hypochrysoides Kraenzl.
- Cyrtandra hypogaea Koord.
- Cyrtandra hypoleuca Kraenzl.
- Cyrtandra iliasii B.L.Burtt
- Cyrtandra ilicifolia Kraenzl.
- Cyrtandra ilocana Merr.
- Cyrtandra imminuta C.B.Clarke
- Cyrtandra impar Kraenzl.
- Cyrtandra impressivenia C.B.Clarke
- Cyrtandra inaequifolia Elmer
- Cyrtandra incisa C.B.Clarke
- Cyrtandra incompta Jack
- Cyrtandra incrustata B.L.Burtt
- Cyrtandra induta A.Gray
- Cyrtandra infantae Kraenzl.
- Cyrtandra inflata (Schltr.) S.S.Ying
- Cyrtandra insignis C.B.Clarke
- Cyrtandra insolita Hilliard & B.L.Burtt
- Cyrtandra insularis Ridl.
- Cyrtandra integerrima B.L.Burtt
- Cyrtandra integrifolia C.B.Clarke
- Cyrtandra involucrata Seem.

== J-K ==
- Cyrtandra jabiensis Schltr.
- Cyrtandra jackii Q.W.Wang & Karton.
- Cyrtandra jadunae Schltr.
- Cyrtandra janowskyi Schltr.
- Cyrtandra jellesmani Koord.
- Cyrtandra jonesii (F.Br.) G.W.Gillett ex W.L.Wagner, A.J.Wagner & Lorence
- Cyrtandra jugalis A.C.Sm.
- Cyrtandra kajewskii Guillaumin
- Cyrtandra kalichii Wawra
- Cyrtandra kalimantana B.L.Burtt
- Cyrtandra kalyptantha Lauterb.
- Cyrtandra kamoolaensis H.St.John
- Cyrtandra kanae B.L.Burtt
- Cyrtandra kandavuensis A.C.Sm.
- Cyrtandra kanehirae S.S.Ying
- Cyrtandra kaniensis Schltr.
- Cyrtandra kauaiensis Wawra
- Cyrtandra kaulantha H.St.John & Storey
- Cyrtandra kealiae Wawra
- Cyrtandra keithii Hilliard & B.L.Burtt
- Cyrtandra kenivensis P.Royen
- Cyrtandra kenwoodii W.L.Wagner & A.J.Wagner
- Cyrtandra kermesina B.L.Burtt
- Cyrtandra kinhoi Karton. & H.J.Atkins
- Cyrtandra kjellbergii R.Bone & H.J.Atkins
- Cyrtandra klossii S.Moore
- Cyrtandra kohalae Rock
- Cyrtandra kostermansii Hilliard & B.L.Burtt
- Cyrtandra kruegeri Reinecke
- Cyrtandra kusaimontana Hosok.

== L ==
- Cyrtandra lacerata B.L.Burtt
- Cyrtandra laciniata G.W.Gillett
- Cyrtandra lagunae Kraenzl.
- Cyrtandra lambirensis B.L.Burtt
- Cyrtandra lanata Hilliard & B.L.Burtt
- Cyrtandra lanceolata Ridl.
- Cyrtandra lanceolifera S.Moore
- Cyrtandra lancifolia Merr.
- Cyrtandra lasiantha K.Schum.
- Cyrtandra lasiogyne Schltr.
- Cyrtandra latibracteata Hilliard & B.L.Burtt
- Cyrtandra laxiflora H.Mann
- Cyrtandra ledermannii Schltr.
- Cyrtandra leiocrater B.L.Burtt
- Cyrtandra lessoniana Gaudich.
- Cyrtandra leucantha A.C.Sm.
- Cyrtandra leucochlamys B.L.Burtt
- Cyrtandra libauensis Hilliard
- Cyrtandra ligulifera C.B.Clarke
- Cyrtandra lillianae Setch.
- Cyrtandra limnophila Kraenzl.
- Cyrtandra linauana B.L.Burtt
- Cyrtandra lineariloba Hilliard & B.L.Burtt
- Cyrtandra lithophila Schltr.
- Cyrtandra livida Kraenzl.
- Cyrtandra lobbii C.B.Clarke
- Cyrtandra locuples S.Moore
- Cyrtandra loheri Quisumb.
- Cyrtandra longe-petiolata de Vriese
- Cyrtandra longicarpa Merr.
- Cyrtandra longiflora J.W.Moore
- Cyrtandra longifolia (Wawra) Hillebr. ex C.B.Clarke
- Cyrtandra longifruticosa M.A.Johnson
- Cyrtandra longipedunculata Rech.
- Cyrtandra longipes Merr.
- Cyrtandra longirostris de Vriese
- Cyrtandra longistamina H.J.Atkins & Karton.
- Cyrtandra loratiloba Bramley
- Cyrtandra lorentzii Lauterb.
- Cyrtandra luteiflora H.J.Atkins
- Cyrtandra lutescens G.W.Gillett
- Cyrtandra lydgatei Hillebr.
- Cyrtandra lysiosepala (A.Gray) C.B.Clarke

== M ==
- Cyrtandra macraei A.Gray
- Cyrtandra macrobracteata Kaneh. & Hatus.
- Cyrtandra macrocalyx Hillebr.
- Cyrtandra macrodiscus Kraenzl.
- Cyrtandra macrophylla Jack
- Cyrtandra macrotricha G.W.Gillett
- Cyrtandra maculata Jack
- Cyrtandra maesifolia Elmer
- Cyrtandra magentiflora G.W.Gillett
- Cyrtandra magnoliifolia Kraenzl.
- Cyrtandra mamolea Reinecke
- Cyrtandra mareensis Däniker
- Cyrtandra marthae H.St.John
- Cyrtandra martini B.L.Burtt
- Cyrtandra mcgregorii Kraenzl.
- Cyrtandra megalocalyx Schltr.
- Cyrtandra megalocrater Kraenzl.
- Cyrtandra megaphylla Hilliard & B.L.Burtt
- Cyrtandra melinocalyx Schltr.
- Cyrtandra membranacea Ridl.
- Cyrtandra membranifolia Elmer
- Cyrtandra mendumae Hilliard & B.L.Burtt
- Cyrtandra menziesii Hook. & Arn.
- Cyrtandra mesilauensis B.L.Burtt
- Cyrtandra microcalyx Kraenzl.
- Cyrtandra microcarpa C.B.Clarke
- Cyrtandra microphylla Merr.
- Cyrtandra milnei Seem.
- Cyrtandra mindanaensis Elmer
- Cyrtandra minjemensis Schltr.
- Cyrtandra minor S.Moore
- Cyrtandra mirabilis C.B.Clarke
- Cyrtandra mollis de Vriese
- Cyrtandra monoica (Lauterb.) S.S.Ying
- Cyrtandra montana Gillespie
- Cyrtandra monticola K.Schum.
- Cyrtandra montigena Schltr.
- Cyrtandra mooreaensis G.W.Gillett
- Cyrtandra mucronata Nadeaud
- Cyrtandra mucronatisepala Quisumb.
- Cyrtandra multibracteata C.B.Clarke
- Cyrtandra multicaulis B.L.Burtt
- Cyrtandra multifolia Merr.
- Cyrtandra multinervis Karton. & R.Bone
- Cyrtandra multiseptata Gillespie
- Cyrtandra muluensis B.L.Burtt
- Cyrtandra munroi C.N.Forbes
- Cyrtandra muskarimba A.C.Sm.

== N-O ==
- Cyrtandra nabirensis Kaneh. & Hatus.
- Cyrtandra nadeaudii C.B.Clarke
- Cyrtandra nana Merr.
- Cyrtandra nanawaleensis H.St.John
- Cyrtandra natewaensis G.W.Gillett
- Cyrtandra navicellata Zipp. ex C.B.Clarke
- Cyrtandra nebelwildernensis S.S.Ying
- Cyrtandra neiothiantha B.L.Burtt
- Cyrtandra nemorosa Blume
- Cyrtandra neoguineana S.S.Ying
- Cyrtandra neohebridensis G.W.Gillett
- Cyrtandra nibongensis Hilliard & B.L.Burtt
- Cyrtandra nitens C.B.Clarke
- Cyrtandra nitida Karton. & H.J.Atkins
- Cyrtandra nodulosa Schltr.
- Cyrtandra nudiflora C.B.Clarke
- Cyrtandra nukuhivensis F.Br.
- Cyrtandra obliquifolia K.R.Wood & W.L.Wagner
- Cyrtandra oblongata Merr.
- Cyrtandra oblongifolia (Blume) Benth. & Hook.f. ex C.B.Clarke
- Cyrtandra obovata G.W.Gillett
- Cyrtandra occidentalis N.P.Balakr. & B.L.Burtt
- Cyrtandra occulta A.C.Sm.
- Cyrtandra ochroleuca B.L.Burtt
- Cyrtandra oenobarba H.Mann
- Cyrtandra oligantha Korth. ex C.B.Clarke
- Cyrtandra olona C.N.Forbes
- Cyrtandra ootensis F.Br.
- Cyrtandra oreogiton K.Schum.
- Cyrtandra oxybapha W.L.Wagner & D.R.Herbst

== P ==
- Cyrtandra pachyneura Kraenzl.
- Cyrtandra pachyphylla Kraenzl.
- Cyrtandra palawensis Schltr.
- Cyrtandra paliku W.L.Wagner, K.R.Wood & Lorence
- Cyrtandra palimasanica Hilliard & B.L.Burtt
- Cyrtandra pallida Elmer
- Cyrtandra pallidifolia Kraenzl.
- Cyrtandra paludosa Gaudich.
- Cyrtandra panayensis Merr.
- Cyrtandra pandurata Ridl.
- Cyrtandra pantothrix Kraenzl.
- Cyrtandra papyracea B.L.Burtt
- Cyrtandra paragibbsiae B.L.Burtt
- Cyrtandra paravelutina Hilliard & B.L.Burtt
- Cyrtandra parva Merr.
- Cyrtandra parvicalyx H.J.Atkins & Karton.
- Cyrtandra parviflora C.B.Clarke
- Cyrtandra parvifolia Merr.
- Cyrtandra parvifructa Hilliard
- Cyrtandra patentiserrata Bramley & Cronk
- Cyrtandra patula Ridl.
- Cyrtandra pauciflora Ridl.
- Cyrtandra paxiana Lauterb.
- Cyrtandra pedicellata B.L.Burtt
- Cyrtandra peltata Jack
- Cyrtandra pendula Blume
- Cyrtandra penduliflora Kraenzl.
- Cyrtandra peninsula Elmer ex Olivar & H.J.Atkins
- Cyrtandra perplexa S.Moore
- Cyrtandra phaeodictyon Schltr.
- Cyrtandra phaeotricha Schltr.
- Cyrtandra phoenicea C.B.Clarke
- Cyrtandra phoenicoides Hilliard & B.L.Burtt
- Cyrtandra phoenicolasia Lauterb.
- Cyrtandra pickeringii A.Gray
- Cyrtandra picta Blume
- Cyrtandra pilosa Blume
- Cyrtandra pilostila K.Schum.
- Cyrtandra pinatubensis Elmer
- Cyrtandra platyphylla A.Gray
- Cyrtandra plectranthiflora Kraenzl.
- Cyrtandra plicata Hilliard
- Cyrtandra pogonantha A.Gray
- Cyrtandra poiensis B.L.Burtt
- Cyrtandra poikilophylla Kraenzl.
- Cyrtandra polyantha C.B.Clarke
- Cyrtandra polyneura (C.B.Clarke) B.L.Burtt
- Cyrtandra ponapensis Kaneh.
- Cyrtandra populifolia Miq.
- Cyrtandra poulsenii B.L.Burtt
- Cyrtandra prattii Gillespie
- Cyrtandra pritchardii Seem.
- Cyrtandra procera Hillebr.
- Cyrtandra propinqua C.N.Forbes
- Cyrtandra prostrata Kraenzl.
- Cyrtandra pruinosa H.St.John & Storey
- Cyrtandra pulchella O.Rich ex A.Gray
- Cyrtandra pulgarensis Elmer ex H.J.Atkins & Cronk
- Cyrtandra pulleana Lauterb.
- Cyrtandra pumilio B.L.Burtt
- Cyrtandra punctatissima Kraenzl.
- Cyrtandra purpurea H.J.Atkins
- Cyrtandra purpureofucata R.Bone & H.J.Atkins
- Cyrtandra purpurifolia G.W.Gillett

== Q-R ==
- Cyrtandra quercifolia S.Moore
- Cyrtandra quinquenotata Kraenzl.
- Cyrtandra radiciflora C.B.Clarke
- Cyrtandra raiateensis J.W.Moore
- Cyrtandra ramiflora Elmer
- Cyrtandra ramunculosa Hilliard & B.L.Burtt
- Cyrtandra rantemarioensis Karton. & R.Bone
- Cyrtandra rarotongensis Cheeseman
- Cyrtandra reinwardtii (C.B.Clarke) Bakh.f.
- Cyrtandra repens de Vriese
- Cyrtandra reticosa C.B.Clarke
- Cyrtandra reticulata G.W.Gillett
- Cyrtandra revoluta Fosberg & Sachet
- Cyrtandra rhabdothamnos Schltr.
- Cyrtandra rhizantha Kraenzl.
- Cyrtandra rhizautha Schltr.
- Cyrtandra rhyncanthera C.B.Clarke
- Cyrtandra richii A.Gray
- Cyrtandra rivularis H.St.John & Storey
- Cyrtandra robusta Kraenzl.
- Cyrtandra roemeri Lauterb.
- Cyrtandra rosea Ridl.
- Cyrtandra roseiflora H.J.Atkins
- Cyrtandra roseoalba Kraenzl.
- Cyrtandra rostrata Blume
- Cyrtandra rotumaensis H.St.John
- Cyrtandra rubiginosa Jack
- Cyrtandra rubra de Vriese
- Cyrtandra rubribracteata Karton. & H.J.Atkins
- Cyrtandra rubricalyx B.L.Burtt
- Cyrtandra rubriflora P.E.Sm. & H.J.Atkins
- Cyrtandra rubropicta Kraenzl.
- Cyrtandra rufa Bakh.f.
- Cyrtandra rufotricha Merr.
- Cyrtandra rupicola Elmer
- Cyrtandra russa C.B.Clarke

== S ==
- Cyrtandra sagetorum Schltr.
- Cyrtandra saligna Kraenzl.
- Cyrtandra samarensis Tandang & M.D.Angeles
- Cyrtandra samoensis A.Gray
- Cyrtandra sandakanensis B.L.Burtt
- Cyrtandra sandei de Vriese
- Cyrtandra sandwicensis (H.Lév.) H.St.John & Storey
- Cyrtandra saniensis Schltr.
- Cyrtandra santosii Merr.
- Cyrtandra sarawakensis C.B.Clarke
- Cyrtandra saxicola Schltr.
- Cyrtandra schizocalyx G.W.Gillett
- Cyrtandra schizostyla C.B.Clarke
- Cyrtandra schlechteri Bramley
- Cyrtandra schraderi K.Schum.
- Cyrtandra schultzei Schltr.
- Cyrtandra schumanniana Schltr.
- Cyrtandra scutata S.Moore
- Cyrtandra scutifolia B.L.Burtt
- Cyrtandra seganica Hilliard & B.L.Burtt
- Cyrtandra sepikana Schltr.
- Cyrtandra sericifolia G.W.Gillett
- Cyrtandra serratifolia H.J.Atkins
- Cyrtandra serratobracteata Lauterb.
- Cyrtandra sessilis H.St.John & Storey
- Cyrtandra sibuyanensis Elmer
- Cyrtandra similis Quisumb.
- Cyrtandra simplex Merr.
- Cyrtandra sinclairiana B.L.Burtt
- Cyrtandra siporensis Olivar
- Cyrtandra smithiana B.L.Burtt
- Cyrtandra sororia Schltr.
- Cyrtandra sorsogonensis Merr.
- Cyrtandra spathacea A.C.Sm.
- Cyrtandra spathulata H.St.John
- Cyrtandra spectabilis R.Bone & H.J.Atkins
- Cyrtandra spelaea B.L.Burtt
- Cyrtandra sphaerocalyx K.Schum.
- Cyrtandra spicata de Vriese
- Cyrtandra splendens C.B.Clarke
- Cyrtandra stenoptera Bramley & Cronk
- Cyrtandra stolleana Schltr.
- Cyrtandra stonei B.L.Burtt
- Cyrtandra strictipes Kraenzl.
- Cyrtandra strongiana Kraenzl.
- Cyrtandra suberosa Lauterb.
- Cyrtandra subglabra Merr.
- Cyrtandra subgrandis B.L.Burtt
- Cyrtandra sublanea Hilliard & B.L.Burtt
- Cyrtandra subsphaerocarpa B.L.Burtt
- Cyrtandra subulibractea G.W.Gillett
- Cyrtandra subumbellata (Hillebr.) H.St.John & Storey
- Cyrtandra suffruticosa Ridl.
- Cyrtandra sulcata Blume

== T ==
- Cyrtandra tagaleurium Kraenzl.
- Cyrtandra tahuatensis Fosberg & Sachet
- Cyrtandra taitensis O.Rich ex A.Gray
- Cyrtandra talonensis Elmer
- Cyrtandra tarsodes B.L.Burtt
- Cyrtandra taviunensis Gillespie
- Cyrtandra tayabensis Elmer
- Cyrtandra tecomiflora Kraenzl.
- Cyrtandra tempestii Horne ex C.B.Clarke
- Cyrtandra tenebrosa B.L.Burtt
- Cyrtandra tenuicarpa H.J.Atkins
- Cyrtandra tenuipes Merr.
- Cyrtandra tenuisepala Quisumb.
- Cyrtandra teres C.B.Clarke
- Cyrtandra terrae-guilelmi K.Schum.
- Cyrtandra tesselata Hilliard & B.L.Burtt
- Cyrtandra teysmannii Miq.
- Cyrtandra thamnodes B.L.Burtt
- Cyrtandra thibaultii Fosberg & Sachet
- Cyrtandra tibangensis B.L.Burtt
- Cyrtandra tintinnabula Rock
- Cyrtandra todaiensis Kaneh.
- Cyrtandra tohiveaensis G.W.Gillett
- Cyrtandra tomentosa A.C.Sm.
- Cyrtandra toreniiflora B.L.Burtt
- Cyrtandra toviana F.Br.
- Cyrtandra trachycaulis K.Schum.
- Cyrtandra treubiana Schltr.
- Cyrtandra trichocalyx G.W.Gillett
- Cyrtandra trichodon Ridl.
- Cyrtandra trichophylla A.C.Sm.
- Cyrtandra trisepala C.B.Clarke
- Cyrtandra trivialis Kraenzl.
- Cyrtandra tubibractea Hilliard & B.L.Burtt
- Cyrtandra tubiflora Kraenzl.
- Cyrtandra tuiwawae M.A.Johnson
- Cyrtandra tunohica Hilliard & B.L.Burtt

== U-V ==
- Cyrtandra uahukaensis W.L.Wagner & Lorence
- Cyrtandra uapouensis W.L.Wagner & Lorence
- Cyrtandra umbellifera Merr.
- Cyrtandra umbraticola Schltr.
- Cyrtandra undata Hilliard & B.L.Burtt
- Cyrtandra uniflora B.L.Burtt
- Cyrtandra urceolata C.B.Clarke
- Cyrtandra urdanetensis Elmer
- Cyrtandra urvillei C.B.Clarke
- Cyrtandra urwaldensis S.S.Ying
- Cyrtandra vaginata B.L.Burtt
- Cyrtandra vairiae Drake
- Cyrtandra valviloba G.W.Gillett
- Cyrtandra vanoverberghii Kraenzl.
- Cyrtandra velutina Korth. ex C.B.Clarke
- Cyrtandra ventricosa G.W.Gillett
- Cyrtandra verrucosissima Kraenzl.
- Cyrtandra versteegii Lauterb.
- Cyrtandra vescoi Drake
- Cyrtandra vesiculata G.W.Gillett
- Cyrtandra vespertina H.St.John
- Cyrtandra vestita Drake
- Cyrtandra victoriae Gillespie
- Cyrtandra villifructus Hilliard & B.L.Burtt
- Cyrtandra villosissima Merr.
- Cyrtandra virescens Schltr.
- Cyrtandra viridescens C.B.Clarke
- Cyrtandra viridiflora H.St.John & Storey
- Cyrtandra vitiensis Seem.
- Cyrtandra vittata Bramley & H.J.Atkins
- Cyrtandra vriesii C.B.Clarke
- Cyrtandra vulpina (Kraenzl.) B.L.Burtt

== W-Z ==
- Cyrtandra wagneri Lorence & Perlman
- Cyrtandra waianaeensis H.St.John & Storey
- Cyrtandra wainihaensis H.Lév.
- Cyrtandra waiolani Wawra
- Cyrtandra waisaliensis M.A.Johnson
- Cyrtandra waldii S.S.Ying
- Cyrtandra wallichii (C.B.Clarke) B.L.Burtt
- Cyrtandra warburgiana Lauterb.
- Cyrtandra wariana Schltr.
- Cyrtandra wawrae C.B.Clarke
- Cyrtandra weberi B.L.Burtt
- Cyrtandra wentiana Lauterb.
- Cyrtandra wichmanniana Schltr.
- Cyrtandra widjajae Karton.
- Cyrtandra wilhelmensis P.Royen
- Cyrtandra winkleri Lauterb.
- Cyrtandra wollastonii S.Moore
- Cyrtandra woodsii B.L.Burtt
- Cyrtandra xanthantha A.C.Sm.
- Cyrtandra yaeyamae Ohwi
- Cyrtandra zamboangensis Merr.
- Cyrtandra zippelii C.B.Clarke
- Cyrtandra zollingeri C.B.Clarke

== Hybrids ==
- Cyrtandra × alata H.St.John & Storey
- Cyrtandra × alnea H.St.John
- Cyrtandra × ambigua (Hillebr.) H.St.John & Storey
- Cyrtandra × arguta (A.Gray) C.B.Clarke
- Cyrtandra × atomigyna H.St.John & Storey
- Cyrtandra × axilliflora H.St.John & Storey
- Cyrtandra × basipartita H.St.John
- Cyrtandra × carinata H.St.John & Storey
- Cyrtandra × caudatisepala H.St.John
- Cyrtandra × caulescens Rock
- Cyrtandra × christophersenii H.St.John & Storey
- Cyrtandra × cladantha Skottsb.
- Cyrtandra × conradtii Rock
- Cyrtandra × crassifolia (Hillebr.) Rock
- Cyrtandra × crassior H.St.John & Storey
- Cyrtandra × cupuliformis H.St.John & Storey
- Cyrtandra × ferrocolorata H.St.John
- Cyrtandra × ferruginosa H.St.John & Storey
- Cyrtandra × forbesii H.St.John & Storey
- Cyrtandra × georgiata C.N.Forbes
- Cyrtandra × glabriflora H.St.John
- Cyrtandra × honolulensis Wawra
- Cyrtandra × hosakae H.St.John & Storey
- Cyrtandra × kaalae H.St.John & Storey
- Cyrtandra × kahanaensis H.St.John & Storey
- Cyrtandra × kipahuluensis H.St.John
- Cyrtandra × kipapaensis H.St.John & Storey
- Cyrtandra × laevis H.St.John
- Cyrtandra × malacophylla C.B.Clarke
- Cyrtandra × mannii H.St.John & Storey
- Cyrtandra × nutans H.St.John
- Cyrtandra × opaeulae H.St.John & Storey
- Cyrtandra × phaie H.St.John
- Cyrtandra × pubens H.St.John
- Cyrtandra × ramosissima Rock
- Cyrtandra × rockii H.St.John & Storey
- Cyrtandra × scabrella C.B.Clarke
- Cyrtandra × subintegra H.St.John
- Cyrtandra × turbiniformis H.St.John & Storey
- Cyrtandra × umbraculiflora Rock
- Cyrtandra × villicalyx H.St.John & Storey
