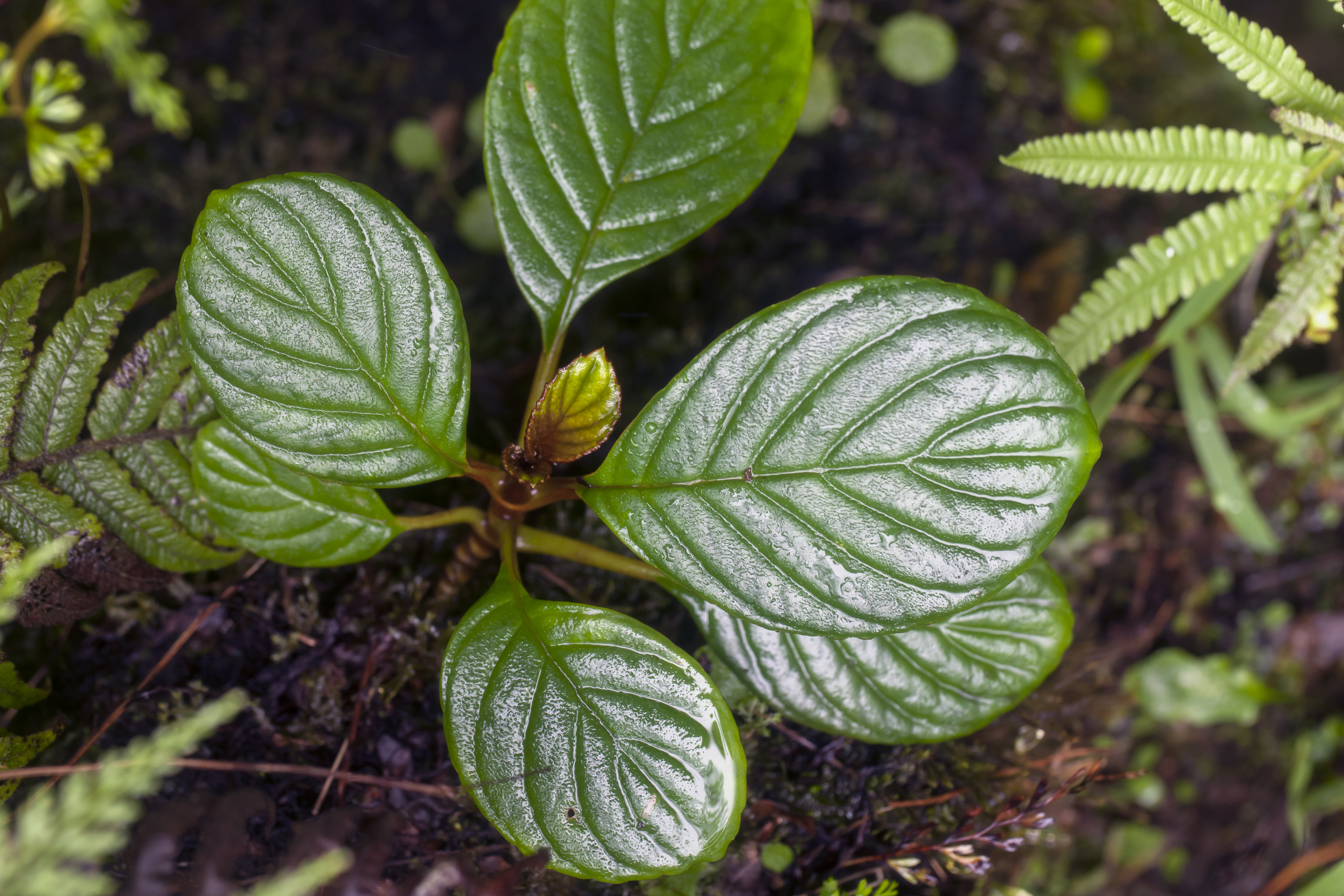

Conservation status
- Endangered (IUCN 3.1)

Scientific classification
- Kingdom: Plantae
- Clade: Tracheophytes
- Clade: Angiosperms
- Clade: Eudicots
- Clade: Asterids
- Order: Lamiales
- Family: Gesneriaceae
- Genus: Cyrtandra
- Species: C. heinrichii

Binomial name
- Cyrtandra heinrichii H. St. John

= Cyrtandra heinrichii =

Species of plant

Cyrtandra heinrichii, known as ha'iwale or lava cyrtandra, is a perennial flowering plant in the family Gesneriaceae. It is found on the Hawaiian island of Kauai.

== Description ==
Cyrtandra heinrichii is a shrub that usually grows by waterfalls on walls of basalt. They are also found in shrubland and wet, tropical or sub-tropical forests dominated by Metrosideros. This species can usually be found with ferns at altitudes between 730m and 1,350m.

This species is closely related to Cyrtandra wawrae.

== Conservation and threats ==
Cyrtandra heinrichii is listed as endangered by the IUCN. It occupies an area of 10km^{2}. There are estimated to be between 250 and 1,000 mature individuals left in the declining population, fragmented into 9 subpopulations. Part of the species range lies within a Natural Area Reserve.

Damage to the plant by slugs and rodents, habitat destruction from wild pigs, and invasive plants species all pose a serious threat to this taxon. These invasive species compete with lava cyrtandra for resources. Such plant species include, but are not exclusive to:

- Erigeron karvinskianus
- Hedychium gardnerianum
- Clidemia hirta
- Cyathea cooperi
- Andropogon virginicus
- Rubus rosifolius
- Blechnum appendiculatum
- Pterolepis glomerata
- Erechtites valerianifolius

In addition, the decline of native bird and insect species has led to a decrease in pollination.
