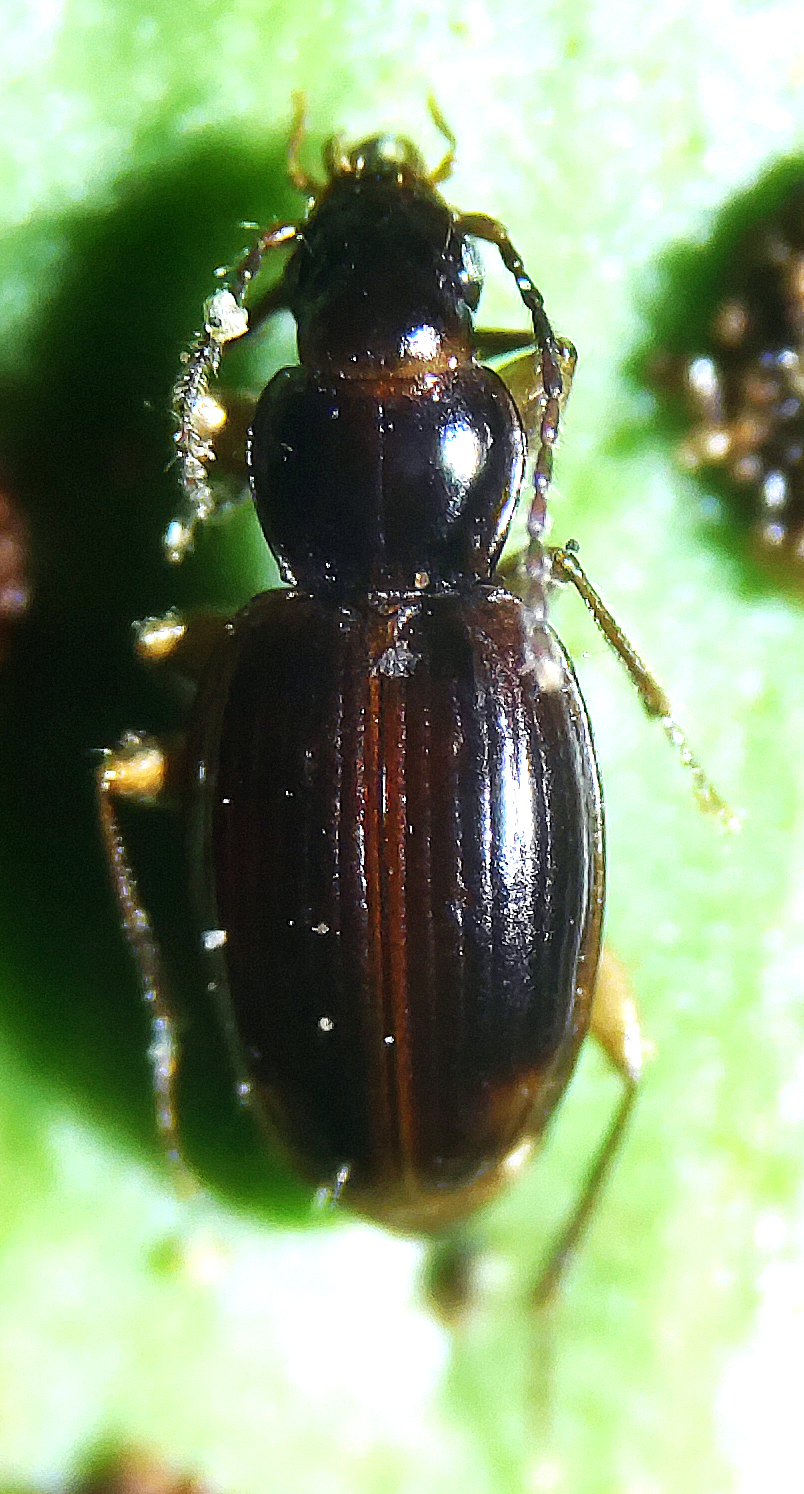

Scientific classification
- Domain: Eukaryota
- Kingdom: Animalia
- Phylum: Arthropoda
- Class: Insecta
- Order: Coleoptera
- Suborder: Adephaga
- Family: Carabidae
- Genus: Trechus
- Species: T. terrabravensis

Binomial name
- Trechus terrabravensis Borges; Serrano & Amorim, 2004

= Trechus terrabravensis =

Species of beetle

Trechus terrabravensis is a beetle species in the family Carabidae endemic to Terceira Island, Azores, Portugal.

== Description and ecology ==
Trechus terrabravensis (Escaravelho-da-terra-brava) is approximately 3,5 mm long. It is an apterous beetle., which means that it does not possess hind wings, which are used for flying, but it still has front wings, elytra, that cover the body. It has well-developed eyes, which are necessary while catching a pray. It is both predator and decomposer

If most Trechus beetles in Azores live in caves, this species lives on the surface, in the core of humid native forests where the plant species Laurus azorica, Juniperus azorica and Ilex perado subsp. azorica occur. They prefer humid places, a very tense carpet of mosses and ferns, which does not let much light to pass to the ground, and is rather found in deep holes and cracks.

== Distribution ==
Trechus terrabravensis lives in the altitudes of 500–1000 m. It is found in Nature Park of Terceira, for example in native forest fragments in Reserva Natural de Terra Brava e Criação das Lagoas, and Caldeira da Serra de Santa Bárbara

== Conservation status ==
Trechus terrabravensis is an Endangered species according to IUCN Red List. It is threatened by the changes in habitat size and quality. Mainly the native habitats are occupied by tree plantations of Cryptomeria japonica and Eucalyptus sp., which are often plantations with cellulose purposes, and the spread of invasive plant species, e.g. Ginger lily Hedychium gardnerianum.
