= Pterolepis =

Pterolepis may refer to:

- Pterolepis (bush cricket), a genus of bush crickets in the tribe Platycleidini
- Pterolepis, a fossil genus of jawless fishes in the family Pterygolepididae; synonym of Pterygolepis
- Pterolepis (plant), a genus of flowering plants in the family Melastomataceae
