= Cyrtandra lysiosepala =

Conservation status
- Vulnerable (NatureServe)

Scientific classification
- Kingdom: Plantae
- Clade: Tracheophytes
- Clade: Angiosperms
- Clade: Eudicots
- Clade: Asterids
- Order: Lamiales
- Family: Gesneriaceae
- Genus: Cyrtandra
- Species: C. lysiosepala

Binomial name
- Cyrtandra lysiosepala (A.Gray) C.B.Clarke

Species of flowering plant

Cyrtandra lysiosepala, or oppositeleaf cyrtandra, is a species of plant in the Gesneriad family that is endemic to the island of Hawai'i, where it grows in wet tropical rainforests.

== Description ==
Cyrtandra lysiosepala grows as a shrub 3–5 metres (9.8–16.4 ft) high. Stems have few branches. Leaves are opposite or in whorls of 3 and 15–32.5 centimetres (5.9–12.8 in) long. Flowers are white.
