= Cyrtandra cumingii =

Scientific classification
- Kingdom: Plantae
- Clade: Tracheophytes
- Clade: Angiosperms
- Clade: Eudicots
- Clade: Asterids
- Order: Lamiales
- Family: Gesneriaceae
- Genus: Cyrtandra
- Species: C. cumingii

Binomial name
- Cyrtandra cumingii C.B.Clarke

Species of plant in the gesneriad family

Cyrtandra cumingii is a species of flowering plant in the family Gesneriaceae, native to the Philippines. It is very similar in appearance to Cyrtandra yaeyamae.
