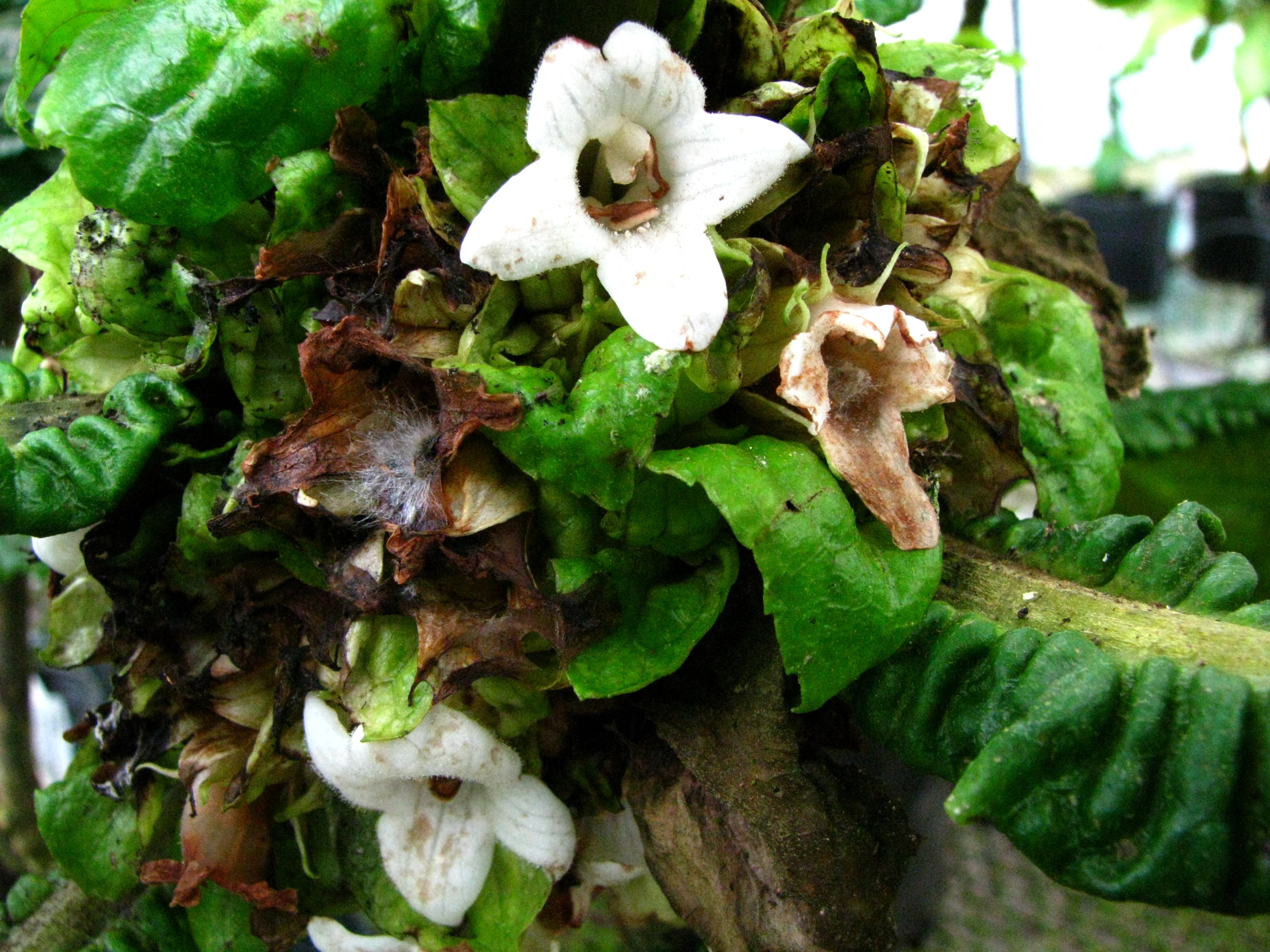

Conservation status
- Critically Imperiled (NatureServe)

Scientific classification
- Kingdom: Plantae
- Clade: Tracheophytes
- Clade: Angiosperms
- Clade: Eudicots
- Clade: Asterids
- Order: Lamiales
- Family: Gesneriaceae
- Genus: Cyrtandra
- Species: C. cyaneoides

Binomial name
- Cyrtandra cyaneoides Rock

= Cyrtandra cyaneoides =

Species of flowering plant

Cyrtandra cyaneoides is a rare species of flowering plant in the African violet family known by the common name māpele. It is endemic to Kauaʻi in Hawaiʻi, where it is known from eleven populations containing a total of under 800 individual plants. Several of these were discovered between 2003 and 2008. It is a shrub that grows 1 to 6 meters tall, bears white flowers, and egg-shaped berries. It was federally listed as an endangered species in 1996.

The plant grows in wet forest habitat, sometimes on cliffs or next to streams. It grows alongside other native plants such as ʻākōlea (Boehmeria grandis), hōʻiʻo (Diplazium sandwichianum), ʻieʻie (Freycinetia arborea), ʻapeʻape (Gunnera kauaiensis), and several other Cyrtandra species. The understory also contains many ferns and bryophytes such as mosses and liverworts. Many of the trees host epiphytes. The habitat is also invaded by non-native plants such as Koster's curse (Clidemia hirta), kahili ginger (Hedychium gardnerianum), and Australian tree fern (Sphaeropteris cooperi); these weeds compete with native flora for resources.

The habitat is also degraded by rats, which eat the seeds of māpele.
