= Cyrtandra impar =

Scientific classification
- Kingdom: Plantae
- Clade: Embryophytes
- Clade: Tracheophytes
- Clade: Spermatophytes
- Clade: Angiosperms
- Clade: Eudicots
- Clade: Asterids
- Order: Lamiales
- Family: Gesneriaceae
- Genus: Cyrtandra
- Species: C. impar

Binomial name
- Cyrtandra impar Kraenzl.

Species of plant in the gesneriad family

Cyrtandra impar is a species of flowering plant in the family Gesneriaceae, native to Borneo. It can be distinguished from similar congeners by its tessellated bark.
