= Cyrtandra baileyi =

Scientific classification
- Kingdom: Plantae
- Clade: Tracheophytes
- Clade: Angiosperms
- Clade: Eudicots
- Clade: Asterids
- Order: Lamiales
- Family: Gesneriaceae
- Genus: Cyrtandra
- Species: C. baileyi

Binomial name
- Cyrtandra baileyi F.Muell.

Species of plant in the gesneriad family

Cyrtandra baileyi is a species of flowering plant in the family Gesneriaceae, native to Queensland, Australia. Male golden bowerbirds (Prionodura newtoniana) use its flowers to decorate their bowers.
