= Cyrtandra decurrens =

Scientific classification
- Kingdom: Plantae
- Clade: Tracheophytes
- Clade: Angiosperms
- Clade: Eudicots
- Clade: Asterids
- Order: Lamiales
- Family: Gesneriaceae
- Genus: Cyrtandra
- Species: C. decurrens

Binomial name
- Cyrtandra decurrens de Vriese

Species of plant in the gesneriad family

Cyrtandra decurrens is a species of flowering plant in the family Gesneriaceae, native to Borneo, the Moluccas, and New Guinea. Local people use its leaves in their cuisine in a manner similar to sorrel.

== Subtaxa ==
The following variety is accepted:

- Cyrtandra decurrens var. decurrens – Moluccas
