= Cyrtandra biflora =

Conservation status
- Vulnerable (IUCN 3.1)

Scientific classification
- Kingdom: Plantae
- Clade: Embryophytes
- Clade: Tracheophytes
- Clade: Angiosperms
- Clade: Eudicots
- Clade: Asterids
- Order: Lamiales
- Family: Gesneriaceae
- Genus: Cyrtandra
- Species: C. biflora

Binomial name
- Cyrtandra biflora J.R.Forst. & G.Forst.

Synonyms
- Besleria biflora G.Forst.; Cyrtandra biflora var. evolutior C.B.Clarke; Cyrtandra parksii Setch.

Species of plant in the gesneriad family

Cyrtandra biflora is a species of flowering plant in the family Gesneriaceae, native to Tahiti. The first species collected in its genus, it was collected (and described) by Johann Reinhold Forster and his son Georg Forster, botanists on the second voyage of James Cook.
