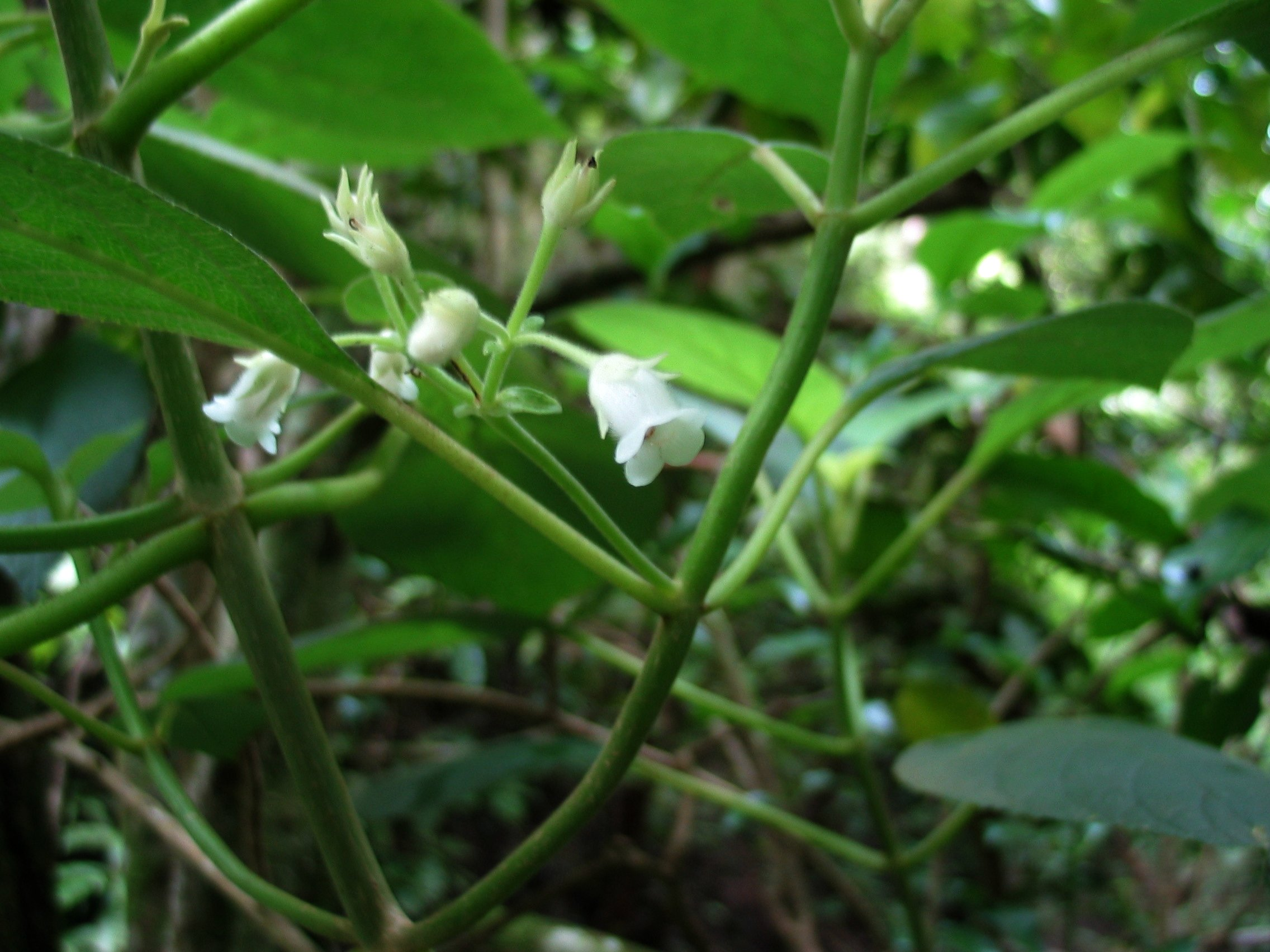
- Flowers

Scientific classification
- Kingdom: Plantae
- Clade: Tracheophytes
- Clade: Angiosperms
- Clade: Eudicots
- Clade: Asterids
- Order: Lamiales
- Family: Gesneriaceae
- Genus: Cyrtandra
- Species: C. waianaeensis

Binomial name
- Cyrtandra waianaeensis H.St.John & Storey

= Cyrtandra waianaeensis =

Species of plant in the gesneriad family

Cyrtandra waianaeensis, the Waiʻanae cyrtandra, is a species of flowering plant in the family Gesneriaceae, native to Oahu, Hawaii. A shrubby tree reaching 20 ft (6 m), it is recommended as an accent or specimen plant due to its textured greenish-yellow to green foliage. Its habitats include disturbed mesic valleys, diverse mesic forests, and wet forests.
