= Cyrtandra vittata =

Scientific classification
- Kingdom: Plantae
- Clade: Tracheophytes
- Clade: Angiosperms
- Clade: Eudicots
- Clade: Asterids
- Order: Lamiales
- Family: Gesneriaceae
- Genus: Cyrtandra
- Species: C. vittata

Binomial name
- Cyrtandra vittata Bramley & H.J.Atkins

Species of flowering plant

Cytandra vittata is a shrub in the African violet family Gesneriaceae with bright pink, candy-striped flowers. It was discovered in 2019 in New Guinea. It grows in rainforest. Doves and pigeons disperse its white berries.
