= Cyrtandra yaeyamae =

Scientific classification
- Kingdom: Plantae
- Clade: Tracheophytes
- Clade: Angiosperms
- Clade: Eudicots
- Clade: Asterids
- Order: Lamiales
- Family: Gesneriaceae
- Genus: Cyrtandra
- Species: C. yaeyamae

Binomial name
- Cyrtandra yaeyamae Ohwi

Synonyms
- Cyrtandra cumingii var. yaeyamana (Ohwi) Hatus; Cyrtandra iriomotensis Leandri

Species of plant in the gesneriad family

Cyrtandra yaeyamae is a species of flowering plant in the family Gesneriaceae, native to Iriomote Island in Japan, and Batan Island in the Philippines. It is very similar in appearance to Cyrtandra cumingii.
