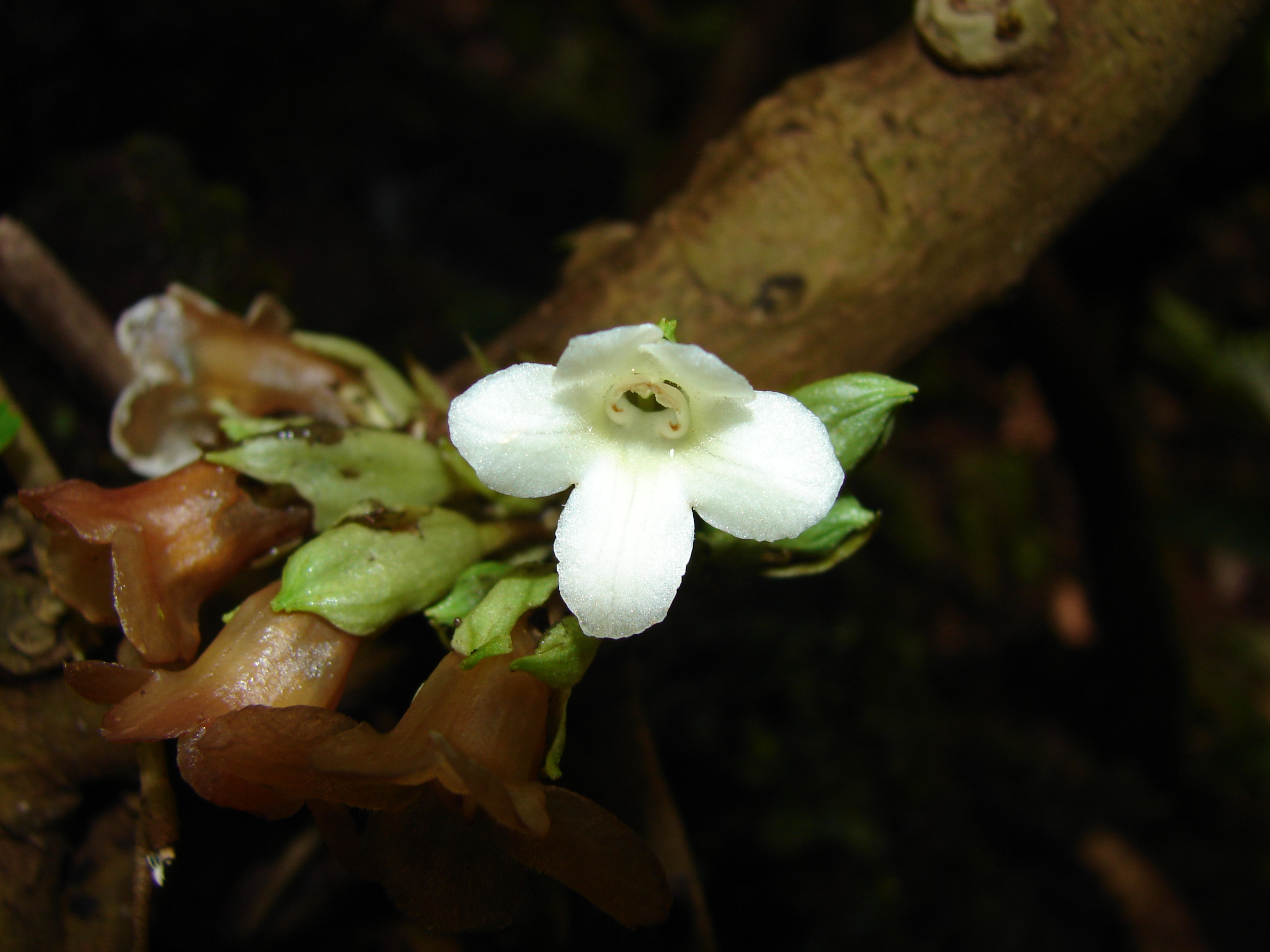
- Flowers

Conservation status
- Critically Endangered (IUCN 3.1)

Scientific classification
- Kingdom: Plantae
- Clade: Tracheophytes
- Clade: Angiosperms
- Clade: Eudicots
- Clade: Asterids
- Order: Lamiales
- Family: Gesneriaceae
- Genus: Cyrtandra
- Species: C. kaulantha

Binomial name
- Cyrtandra kaulantha H.St.John & Storey

= Cyrtandra kaulantha =

Species of plant in the gesneriad family

Cyrtandra kaulantha, the Waikane valley cyrtandra, is a species of flowering plant in the family Gesneriaceae, native to Oahu, Hawaii. It is of hybrid origin, with the parents possibly being C. grandiflora and C. hawaiensis.
