= Cyrtandra pogonantha =

Scientific classification
- Kingdom: Plantae
- Clade: Tracheophytes
- Clade: Angiosperms
- Clade: Eudicots
- Clade: Asterids
- Order: Lamiales
- Family: Gesneriaceae
- Genus: Cyrtandra
- Species: C. pogonantha

Binomial name
- Cyrtandra pogonantha A.Gray

Synonyms
- Cyrtandra godeffroyi Reinecke

Species of flowering plant

Cyrtandra pogonantha Is a species of plant in the family Gesneriaceae. It is endemic to Samoa, and can be found in disturbed ridge forests.
