= Cyrtandra albiflora =

Scientific classification
- Kingdom: Plantae
- Clade: Tracheophytes
- Clade: Angiosperms
- Clade: Eudicots
- Clade: Asterids
- Order: Lamiales
- Family: Gesneriaceae
- Genus: Cyrtandra
- Species: C. albiflora

Binomial name
- Cyrtandra albiflora Karton. & H.J.Atkins

Species of plant in the gesneriad family

Cyrtandra albiflora is a species of flowering plant in the family Gesneriaceae, native to Indonesia. It is only found on Mount Hek on the island of Sulawesi.

== Etymology ==
This species is named for its white flowers.

== Proposed IUCN conservation category ==
Cyrtandra albiflora is known from a population on a single mountain, in an area without protection, and in a habitat that is known to be threatened, and so the describers of the species propose it should be recognised as Critically Endangered.
