= Cyrtandra laxiflora =

Conservation status
- Endangered (IUCN 3.1)

- Vulnerable (NatureServe)

Scientific classification
- Kingdom: Plantae
- Clade: Tracheophytes
- Clade: Angiosperms
- Clade: Eudicots
- Clade: Asterids
- Order: Lamiales
- Family: Gesneriaceae
- Genus: Cyrtandra
- Species: C. laxiflora

Binomial name
- Cyrtandra laxiflora H.Mann

Synonyms
- Heterotypic Synonyms: Cyrtandra adpressipilosa H.St.John; Cyrtandra campaniformis H.St.John; Cyrtandra discors H.St.John & W.N.Takeuchi; Cyrtandra infrapallida H.St.John; Cyrtandra kailuaensis H.St.John; Cyrtandra longicalyx H.St.John; Cyrtandra stupantha H.St.John & Storey; Cyrtandra trinalis H.St.John & W.N.Takeuchi

Species of plant in the gesneriad family

Cyrtandra laxiflora is a species of flowering plant in the family Gesneriaceae, known by the commons name of drooping cyrtandra or "haʻiwale" in Hawaiian. It is native to Hawaii. It is only found on the windward side of Oʻahu.
