= Cyrtandra tintinnabula =

Conservation status
- Critically Imperiled (NatureServe)

Scientific classification
- Kingdom: Plantae
- Clade: Tracheophytes
- Clade: Angiosperms
- Clade: Eudicots
- Clade: Asterids
- Order: Lamiales
- Family: Gesneriaceae
- Genus: Cyrtandra
- Species: C. tintinnabula

Binomial name
- Cyrtandra tintinnabula Rock

Species of flowering plant

Cyrtandra tintinnabula is a rare species of flowering plant in the African violet family known by the common name Laupahoehoe cyrtandra. It is endemic to the island of Hawaii, where it is known only from the slopes of Mauna Kea. As of 1996 there were only three occurrences containing fewer than 20 individuals total. It was federally listed as an endangered species in 1994. Like other Hawaiian Cyrtandra it is called ha`iwale.

This plant is a white-flowered shrub growing 1 to 2 meters tall. Its habitat is threatened by feral pigs and exotic plant species such as Koster's curse (Clidemia hirta).
