= Cyrtandra calyptribracteata =

Scientific classification
- Kingdom: Plantae
- Clade: Tracheophytes
- Clade: Angiosperms
- Clade: Eudicots
- Clade: Asterids
- Order: Lamiales
- Family: Gesneriaceae
- Genus: Cyrtandra
- Species: C. calyptribracteata

Binomial name
- Cyrtandra calyptribracteata Bakh.f.

Species of flowering plant

Cyrtandra calyptribracteata is a species of Cyrtandra of the family Gesneriaceae.
