= Cyrtandra viridiflora =

Conservation status
- Critically Imperiled (NatureServe)

Scientific classification
- Kingdom: Plantae
- Clade: Tracheophytes
- Clade: Angiosperms
- Clade: Eudicots
- Clade: Asterids
- Order: Lamiales
- Family: Gesneriaceae
- Genus: Cyrtandra
- Species: C. viridiflora

Binomial name
- Cyrtandra viridiflora H.St.John & Storey

Species of flowering plant

Cyrtandra viridiflora is a rare species of flowering plant in the African violet family. It is endemic to Hawaii, where it is known only from the northern Koolau Mountains of Oahu. By 2003 there were nine small populations remaining, for a total of 69 plants. It was federally listed as an endangered species in 1996. Like other Hawaiian Cyrtandra it is called ha`iwale.

This plant is a shrub growing 0.5 to 2 meters tall with hairy leaves and green and white flowers. It grows in the cloud zone of the mountains in wet, windy habitat. This habitat is degraded by several forces, including feral pigs and exotic plant species such as Koster's curse (Clidemia hirta) and strawberry guava (Psidium cattleianum). In conservation efforts, some plants have been fenced to protect them and many seeds have been collected.
