= Cyrtandra crenata =

Conservation status
- Critically endangered, possibly extinct (IUCN 3.1)

- Possibly Extinct (NatureServe)

Scientific classification
- Kingdom: Plantae
- Clade: Tracheophytes
- Clade: Angiosperms
- Clade: Eudicots
- Clade: Asterids
- Order: Lamiales
- Family: Gesneriaceae
- Genus: Cyrtandra
- Species: C. crenata

Binomial name
- Cyrtandra crenata H.St.John & Storey

Species of flowering plant

Cyrtandra crenata is a rare species of flowering plant belonging to the African violet family known by the common name Kahana Valley cyrtandra. It is endemic to Oahu in Hawaii, where it is known to be found only from the Koolau Mountains. It has not been seen since 1947, however, and it is feared to be extinct. The habitat is steep and inaccessible in some areas, so it is possible that specimens of this species still exist in the wild. It was federally listed an endangered species of the United States in 1994. This shrub grows 1 to 2 meters tall and bears white flowers. Like other Hawaiian Cyrtandra it is called ha`iwale.
