= Cyrtandra waiolani =

Conservation status
- Extinct in the Wild (IUCN 3.1)

Scientific classification
- Kingdom: Plantae
- Clade: Tracheophytes
- Clade: Angiosperms
- Clade: Eudicots
- Clade: Asterids
- Order: Lamiales
- Family: Gesneriaceae
- Genus: Cyrtandra
- Species: C. waiolani

Binomial name
- Cyrtandra waiolani Wawra

Synonyms
- Cyrtandra hillebrandii Vatke; Cyrtandra oahuensis H.Lév.

Species of flowering plant

Cyrtandra waiolani is a species of plant in the family Gesneriaceae. The species was endemic to Koʻolau Range in Hawaii, and is extinct in the wild.
