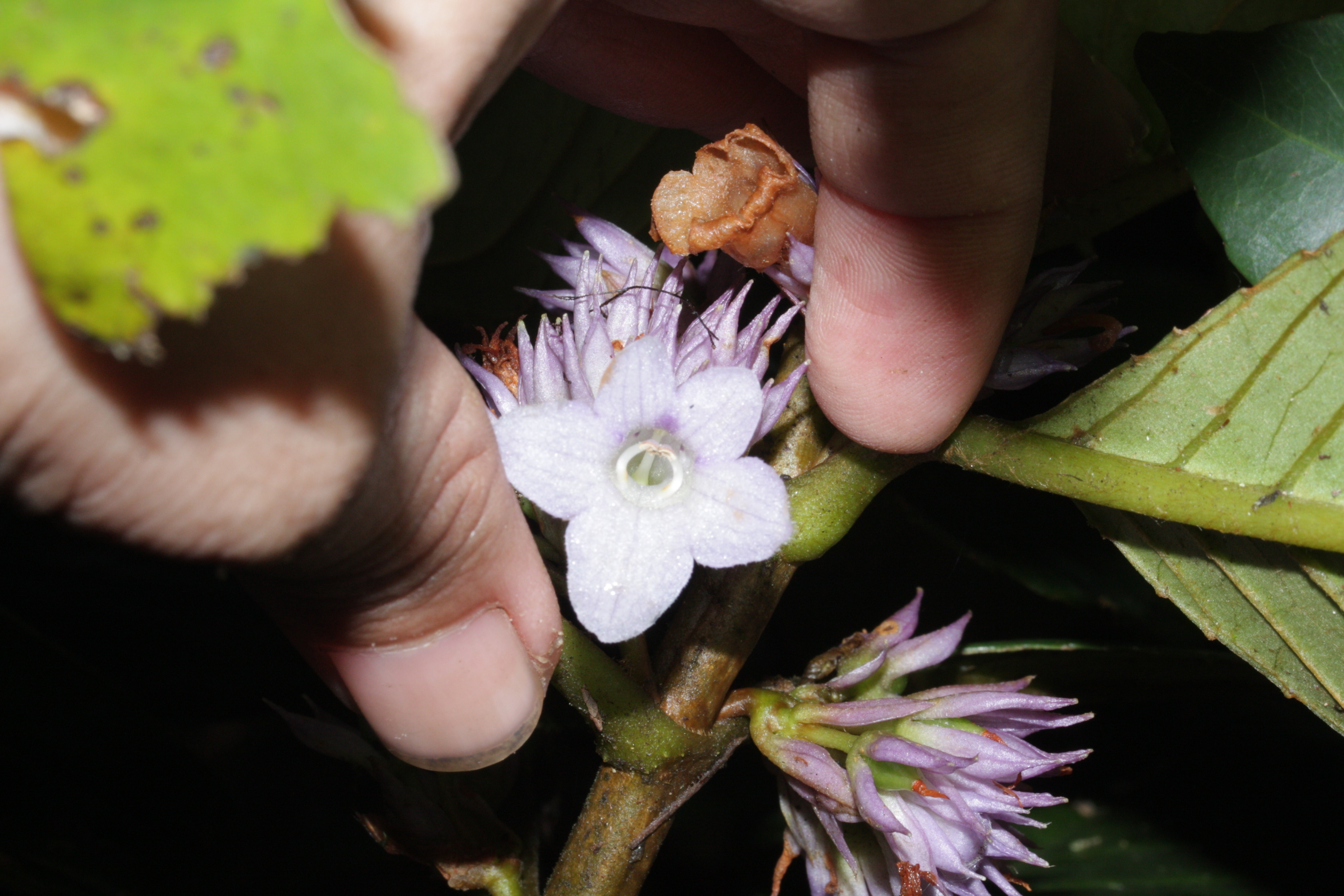

Scientific classification
- Kingdom: Plantae
- Clade: Tracheophytes
- Clade: Angiosperms
- Clade: Eudicots
- Clade: Asterids
- Order: Lamiales
- Family: Gesneriaceae
- Genus: Cyrtandra
- Species: C. cleopatrae

Binomial name
- Cyrtandra cleopatrae H.J.Atkins & Cronk

= Cyrtandra cleopatrae =

Species of flowering plant

Cyrtandra cleopatrae is a species of plant in the family Gesneriaceae endemic to the Philippines. It is a tropical shrub having recaulescent inflorescences composed of multiple purpled flowers that emerge on the plant stem from stubby shoots. It was first collected for science during a 1998 expedition sponsored by the Royal Botanic Garden Edinburgh, from a location in Palawan called Cleopatra's Needle (elev. 1550m), thus the specific epithet "cleopatrae". The taxon was first published in the Edinburgh Journal of Botany in 2001.
