= Cyrtandra subumbellata =

Conservation status
- Critically Imperiled (NatureServe)

Scientific classification
- Kingdom: Plantae
- Clade: Tracheophytes
- Clade: Angiosperms
- Clade: Eudicots
- Clade: Asterids
- Order: Lamiales
- Family: Gesneriaceae
- Genus: Cyrtandra
- Species: C. subumbellata

Binomial name
- Cyrtandra subumbellata (Hillebr.) H.St.John & Storey

Species of flowering plant

Cyrtandra subumbellata is a rare species of flowering plant in the African violet family known by the common name parasol cyrtandra. It is endemic to Hawaii, where it is known only from the Koʻolau Mountains on the island of Oahu. By 2008 there were three known populations containing 110 plants, or possibly more. It was federally listed as an endangered species in 1996. Like other Hawaiian Cyrtandra it is called ha`iwale.

This plant grows in wet forests, often near streams. It is a shrub growing 2 to 3 meters tall and bearing white flowers.

The habitat is degraded by a number of forces, including exotic plant species such as Koster's curse (Clidemia hirta), feral pigs, and military activity. Rats and slugs may damage plants. Also, this species tends to hybridize easily with the other Cyrtandra in the forest, and there may actually be more hybrids than pure individuals of C. subumbellata in some areas. The phenomenon of genetic pollution may be a threat to the species, in this case. More populations of this plant may exist in dense or inaccessible areas of the forest which have not been surveyed.
