= Cyrtandra munroi =

Conservation status
- Critically Imperiled (NatureServe)

Scientific classification
- Kingdom: Plantae
- Clade: Tracheophytes
- Clade: Angiosperms
- Clade: Eudicots
- Clade: Asterids
- Order: Lamiales
- Family: Gesneriaceae
- Genus: Cyrtandra
- Species: C. munroi

Binomial name
- Cyrtandra munroi Forbes

Species of flowering plant

Cyrtandra munroi is a rare species of flowering plant in the African violet family known by the common names Lanaihale cyrtandra and Munro's cyrtandra. It is endemic to Hawaii, where it is known from the islands of Lanai and Maui. There are fewer than 50 individuals remaining in the wild. It is a shrub with hairy leaves and white flowers. It was federally listed as an endangered species in 1992. Like other Hawaiian Cyrtandra it is called ha`iwale.

The wet forests where this plant occurs are destroyed and degraded by several processes, such as deer and exotic plant species.
