= Cyrtandra paliku =

Conservation status
- Critically Imperiled (NatureServe)

Scientific classification
- Kingdom: Plantae
- Clade: Tracheophytes
- Clade: Angiosperms
- Clade: Eudicots
- Clade: Asterids
- Order: Lamiales
- Family: Gesneriaceae
- Genus: Cyrtandra
- Species: C. paliku

Binomial name
- Cyrtandra paliku W.L.Wagner, K.R.Wood & D.H.Lorence

Species of flowering plant

Cyrtandra paliku is a rare species of flowering plant in the African violet family known by the common name cliffside cyrtandra. It is endemic to Hawaii, where it is known only from the island of Kauai. The plant was first discovered in 1993 and it was described to science as a new species in 2001. At the time it was discovered there was only one population containing 70 individuals; a 2006 count revealed only ten plants remaining. It was federally listed as an endangered species in 2010. Like other Hawaiian Cyrtandra it is called ha`iwale.

This plant grows only on Mount Namahana in the Makaleha Mountains on the island of Kauai. This rare plant is apparently limited to a specific type of habitat: windy, misty, north-facing basalt cliffs wet with seeping water. It is possible that it went unidentified as a new species for so long because researchers must climb steep rock cliffs to examine it. It grows alongside Selaginella arbuscula in the understory of Metrosideros polymorpha and Dicranopteris linearis. The plant can be differentiated from other Cyrtandra in part by its shaggy coat of reddish brown hairs.
