= Cyrtandra giffardii =

Conservation status
- Endangered (IUCN 2.3)

Scientific classification
- Kingdom: Plantae
- Clade: Tracheophytes
- Clade: Angiosperms
- Clade: Eudicots
- Clade: Asterids
- Order: Lamiales
- Family: Gesneriaceae
- Genus: Cyrtandra
- Species: C. giffardii

Binomial name
- Cyrtandra giffardii H.St.John & Storey

Species of flowering plant

Cyrtandra giffardii is a rare species of flowering plant in the African violet family known by the common names forest cyrtandra and Giffard's cyrtandra. It is endemic to the island of Hawaii, where it grows on the slopes of Mauna Kea and Mauna Loa. A 1998 estimate places the total remaining population size around 1000 individual plants. It is a tree which grows 2 to 6 metres (6 ft 7 in to 19 ft 8 in) tall and bears white flowers. It was federally listed as an endangered species in 1994. Like other Hawaiian Cyrtandra it is called ha`iwale.

The plant grows in the wet forests of the two Hawaiian volcanoes and faces habitat degradation caused by feral pigs and cattle in the area. There is also an invasion by non-native plants in these forests.
