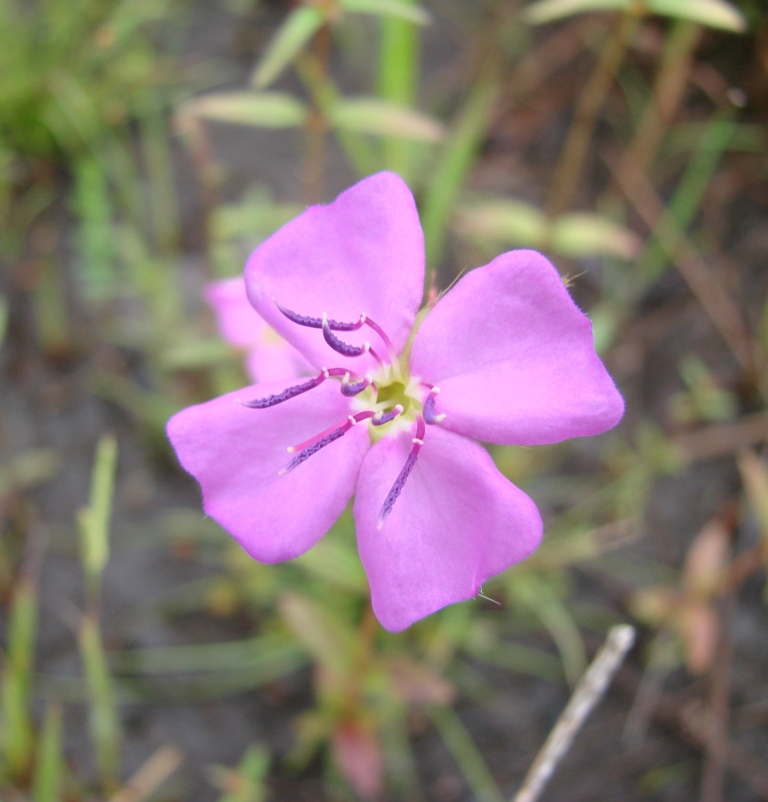

Scientific classification
- Kingdom: Plantae
- Clade: Embryophytes
- Clade: Tracheophytes
- Clade: Angiosperms
- Clade: Eudicots
- Clade: Rosids
- Order: Myrtales
- Family: Melastomataceae
- Genus: Pterolepis
- Species: P. glomerata

Binomial name
- Pterolepis glomerata (Rottb.) Miq.

= Pterolepis glomerata =

Species of flowering plant

Pterolepis glomerata, the false meadowbeauty, is a plant species in the family Melastomataceae. The plant grows in humid grasslands and in gardens. Its distribution is neotropical.
