= Cyrtandra oenobarba =

Conservation status
- Endangered (IUCN 3.1)

- Critically Imperiled (NatureServe)

Scientific classification
- Kingdom: Plantae
- Clade: Tracheophytes
- Clade: Angiosperms
- Clade: Eudicots
- Clade: Asterids
- Order: Lamiales
- Family: Gesneriaceae
- Genus: Cyrtandra
- Species: C. oenobarba

Binomial name
- Cyrtandra oenobarba H.Mann

Synonyms
- Heterotypic Synonyms: Cyrtandra asaroides H.Lév.; Cyrtandra obtusa H.St.John; Cyrtandra oenobarba var. herbacea Wawra; Cyrtandra oenobarba var. petiolaris Wawra; Cyrtandra oenobarba var. proceripetiolata H.St.John; Cyrtandra oenobarba var. rotundifolia Wawra; Cyrtandra pubinervis H.St.John

Species of flowering plant

Cyrtandra oenobarba is a species of rare flowering plant in the African violet family, Gesneriaceae. It is known by the common name shaggystem cyrtandra. It is endemic to Hawaii, where it is known only from the island of Kauai. It can be found in only three localized areas of the island and there are fewer than 500 individuals remaining in the wild. It was federally listed as an endangered species in 2010. Like other Hawaiian Cyrtandra it is called haʻiwale.

This plant grows in wet inland valleys where there is abundant rainfall. It grows in constantly wet habitat such as bogs and mossy rocks near waterfalls. This habitat is degraded by feral pigs and exotic plant species.

This subshrub is thought to have been much more widespread in the past; it was collected from many locations on the island.
