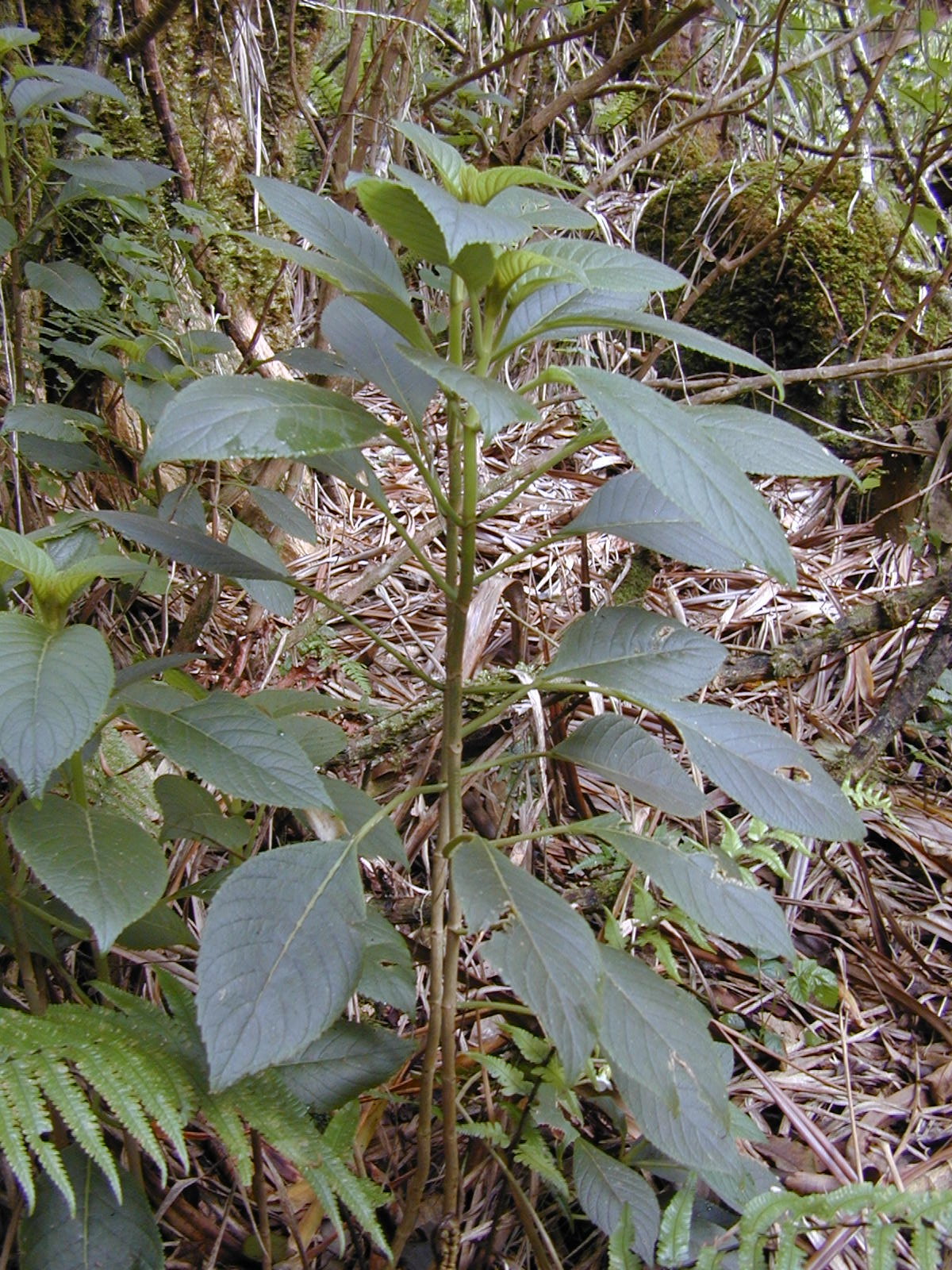
- Habit
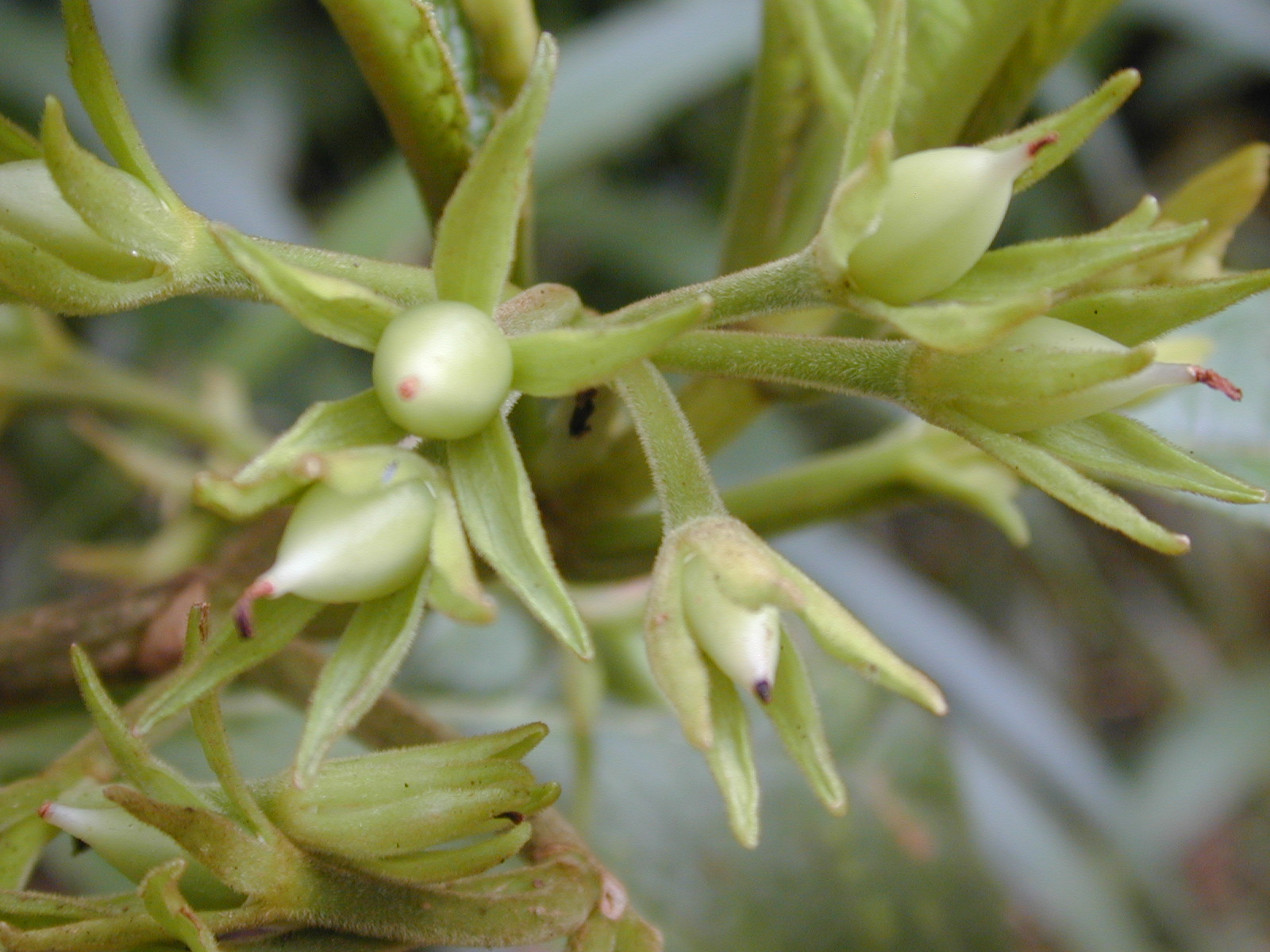
- Close-up of flower buds

Scientific classification
- Kingdom: Plantae
- Clade: Tracheophytes
- Clade: Angiosperms
- Clade: Eudicots
- Clade: Asterids
- Order: Lamiales
- Family: Gesneriaceae
- Genus: Cyrtandra
- Species: C. platyphylla

Binomial name
- Cyrtandra platyphylla A.Gray

Synonyms
- List: Cyrtandra baccifera C.B.Clarke; Cyrtandra begoniifolia Hillebr.; Cyrtandra clarkei Vatke ex Skottsb.; Cyrtandra cordata H.St.John; Cyrtandra crinalis H.St.John; Cyrtandra grossecrenata H.St.John & Storey; Cyrtandra hillebrandii C.B.Clarke; Cyrtandra mauiensis Rock; Cyrtandra oliveri Rock; Cyrtandra ovatiloba H.St.John; Cyrtandra petila H.St.John; Cyrtandra waiheae (Rock) H.St.John

= Cyrtandra platyphylla =

Species of plant in the gesneriad family

Cyrtandra platyphylla, the ʻilihia, is a species of flowering plant in the family Gesneriaceae, native to Hawaii. A common shrub of the rainforest understory, it is found on Maui and the big island of Hawaii.
