= Cyrtandra polyantha =

Conservation status
- Critically Endangered (IUCN 3.1)

Scientific classification
- Kingdom: Plantae
- Clade: Tracheophytes
- Clade: Angiosperms
- Clade: Eudicots
- Clade: Asterids
- Order: Lamiales
- Family: Gesneriaceae
- Genus: Cyrtandra
- Species: C. polyantha

Binomial name
- Cyrtandra polyantha C.B.Clark

Species of flowering plant

Cyrtandra polyantha is a rare species of flowering plant in the African violet family known by the common names Niu Valley cyrtandra. It is endemic to Hawaii, where it is known only from the Koʻolau Mountains of Oahu. In 2007 there were only two populations containing a total of 46 mature plants, but one of the two populations is made up of a single individual. It was federally listed as an endangered species in 1994. Like other Hawaiian Cyrtandra it is called ha`iwale.

The plant grows in ridgetop forests in steep habitat that can only be accessed by rappelling down to the area. It is a shrub growing 1 to 3 metres (3 ft 3 in to 9 ft 10 in) tall. It bears white flowers in October and white, fleshy fruit by January. Little else is known about the life history of the plant. The habitat on these mountain slopes is degraded by a number of forces, including feral pigs and exotic plant species, especially pamakani haole (Ageratina adenophora). Other potential threats include rats, snails, slugs, and researchers and conservationists who inadvertently collect too many of the seeds. Many seeds have been collected and some seedlings grown in the nursery; a few of these have been planted in an enclosure and appear to be thriving.
