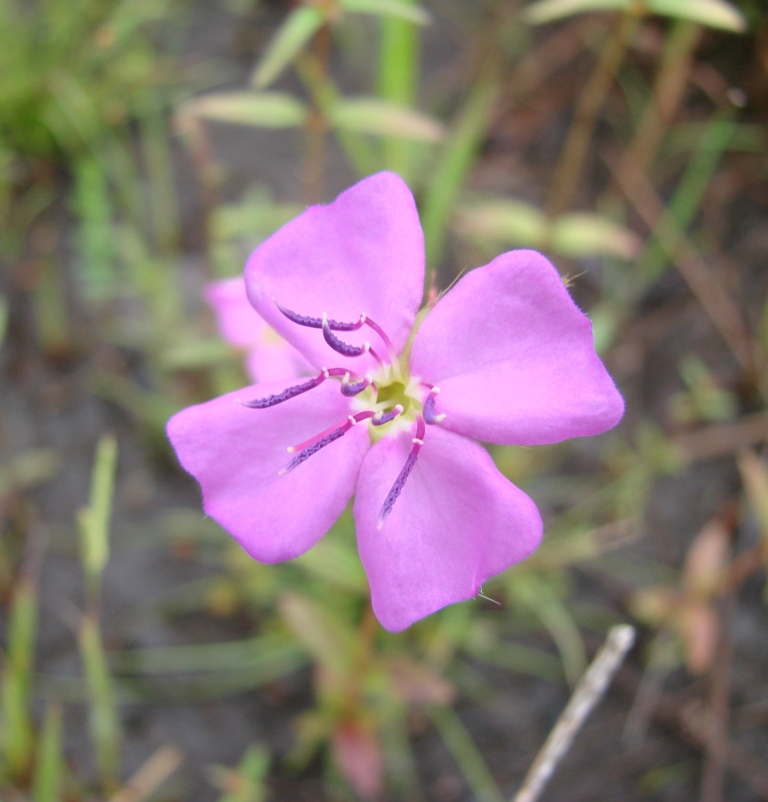
- Pterolepis glomerata

Scientific classification
- Kingdom: Plantae
- Clade: Embryophytes
- Clade: Tracheophytes
- Clade: Angiosperms
- Clade: Eudicots
- Clade: Rosids
- Order: Myrtales
- Family: Melastomataceae
- Genus: Pterolepis (DC.) Miq.

Species
- Pterolepis glomerata

= Pterolepis (plant) =

Genus of flowering plants

Pterolepis is a genus of flowering plant in the family Melastomataceae. Within Melastomataceae, it forms a clade with genus Pterogastra. Pterolepis contains some fifteen species, all of which are found in the Neotropical geographic realmm. Most species are concentrated in Brazil, with a few others across Central and South America.

== Species ==
Species, accepted as of April 2021, are:

- Pterolepis alpestris Triana
- Pterolepis buraeavi Cogn.
- Pterolepis cataphracta Triana
- Pterolepis cearensis Huber
- Pterolepis glomerata (Rottb.) Miq.
- Pterolepis haplostemona Almeda & A.B.Martins
- Pterolepis parnassiifolia Triana
- Pterolepis perpusilla Cogn.
- Pterolepis picorondonca S.S.Renner
- Pterolepis polygonoides Triana
- Pterolepis repanda Triana
- Pterolepis riedeliana Cogn.
- Pterolepis rotundifolia Wurdack
- Pterolepis stenophylla Gleason
- Pterolepis trichotoma (Rottb.) Cogn.
