= Cyrtandra paludosa =

Scientific classification
- Kingdom: Plantae
- Clade: Tracheophytes
- Clade: Angiosperms
- Clade: Eudicots
- Clade: Asterids
- Order: Lamiales
- Family: Gesneriaceae
- Genus: Cyrtandra
- Species: C. paludosa

Binomial name
- Cyrtandra paludosa Gaudich.

Synonyms
- List: Cyrtandra brevicalyx (Hillebr.) H.St.John; Cyrtandra garberi H.St.John; Cyrtandra glauca Drake; Cyrtandra hyperdasa H.St.John; Cyrtandra laevicalycis H.St.John; Cyrtandra nubincolens H.St.John; Cyrtandra orbicularis H.St.John; Cyrtandra paludosa var. arborescens Wawra; Cyrtandra paludosa var. herbacea Wawra; Cyrtandra paludosa var. honopueensis H.St.John; Cyrtandra paludosa var. irrostrata H.St.John; Cyrtandra paludosa var. kohalaensis H.St.John; Cyrtandra paludosa var. montana H.St.John; Cyrtandra paludosa var. paludosa Wawra; Cyrtandra paludosa var. subherbacea Wawra; Cyrtandra sericea H.St.John

Species of plant in the gesneriad family

Cyrtandra paludosa is a species of flowering plant in the family Gesneriaceae, native to Hawaii. It is found on all the Hawaiian islands except Lanai.

== Subtaxa ==
The following varieties are accepted:

- Cyrtandra paludosa var. microcarpa Wawra
- Cyrtandra paludosa var. paludosa
