= Cyrtandra dentata =

Conservation status
- Critically Imperiled (NatureServe)

Scientific classification
- Kingdom: Plantae
- Clade: Tracheophytes
- Clade: Angiosperms
- Clade: Eudicots
- Clade: Asterids
- Order: Lamiales
- Family: Gesneriaceae
- Genus: Cyrtandra
- Species: C. dentata

Binomial name
- Cyrtandra dentata H.St.John & Storey

Species of flowering plant

Cyrtandra dentata is a rare species of flowering plant in the African violet family known by the common names mountain cyrtandra and sharp-toothed cyrtandra. It is endemic to Oahu in Hawaii, where the most recent count estimates 1640 plants occurring in the Waianae Mountains and Koʻolau Mountains. It is a shrub which can reach 5 meters tall and bears white flowers. It was federally listed as an endangered species in 1996. Like other Hawaiian Cyrtandra it is called ha`iwale.

One threat to the species is habitat degradation caused by feral pigs. Some individuals of this species are protected from pig damage by fences put up by the US Army. These enclosures also protect the plant from rats. The plant grows in moist forest that becomes dry in the dry season and is prone to fire, more so when there are military exercises in the area, and the plant does not tolerate fire. There is also an invasion by non-native plants such as Koster's curse (Clidemia hirta), thimbleberry (Rubus rosifolius), and Christmas berry (Schinus terebinthifolius).

The US Army is collecting and storing seeds of this species.
