= Cyrtandra elegans =

Scientific classification
- Kingdom: Plantae
- Clade: Tracheophytes
- Clade: Angiosperms
- Clade: Eudicots
- Clade: Asterids
- Order: Lamiales
- Family: Gesneriaceae
- Genus: Cyrtandra
- Species: C. elegans

Binomial name
- Cyrtandra elegans Schltr.

Species of flowering plant

Cyrtandra elegans is a species of flowering plants in the family Gesneriaceae. It is found on the island of New Guinea.
