= Cyrtandra argentii =

Conservation status
- Near Threatened (IUCN 3.1)

Scientific classification
- Kingdom: Plantae
- Clade: Tracheophytes
- Clade: Angiosperms
- Clade: Eudicots
- Clade: Asterids
- Order: Lamiales
- Family: Gesneriaceae
- Genus: Cyrtandra
- Species: C. argentii

Binomial name
- Cyrtandra argentii Olivar, H.J.Atkins & Muellner

Species of flowering plant

Cyrtandra argentii is a species of flowering plant in the family Gesneriaceae. It is endemic to the Philippines. Discovered in 1997, it is characterized by its pendulous inflorescences, white woolly indumentum, and ovoid fruits. This species thrives in rainforest environments with high humidity and constant moisture. Cyrtandra argentii is classified as Near Threatened by the International Union for Conservation of Nature (IUCN) due to habitat loss and deforestation.

The plant species is named after tropical botanist George Argent, who significantly contributed to the understanding of Philippine flora.

== Description ==
The stems are slightly grooved and covered with white, woolly hairs. The leaves are opposite and subequal. The petioles, which connect the leaf blade to the stem, are 4–7 cm (1.6–2.8 in). The densely hirsute leaf blades are oblong to oblong-elliptical, asymmetrical, and typically measure 13–30 cm (5.1–11.8 in) long and 7–15 cm (2.8–5.9 in) wide. The pendulous, compound cymose inflorescences have 10–15 flowers. The inflorescences grow on densely hirsute peduncles that measure 5–6 cm (2.0–2.4 in) long. The calyx is densely hirsute externally, glabrous internally, and acuminate. After the flower has been pollinated, the calyx persists and completely encloses the fruit. The corollas are white and glabrous both internally and externally. The fruits are green, ovoid, and glabrous.

== Habitat ==
Cyrtandra argentii is endemic to the Philippines, specifically thriving in its tropical rainforest environments. These rainforests are characterized by high humidity, consistent moisture, and low light conditions, which are ideal for the growth of Cyrtandra species. The plant is typically found next to streams. Habitat loss due to deforestation poses a significant threat to its natural environment.

== Conservation ==
Cyrtandra argentii is classified as a near-threatened species by the International Union for the Conservation of Nature (IUCN) criteria due to deforestation and insufficient formal protection.
