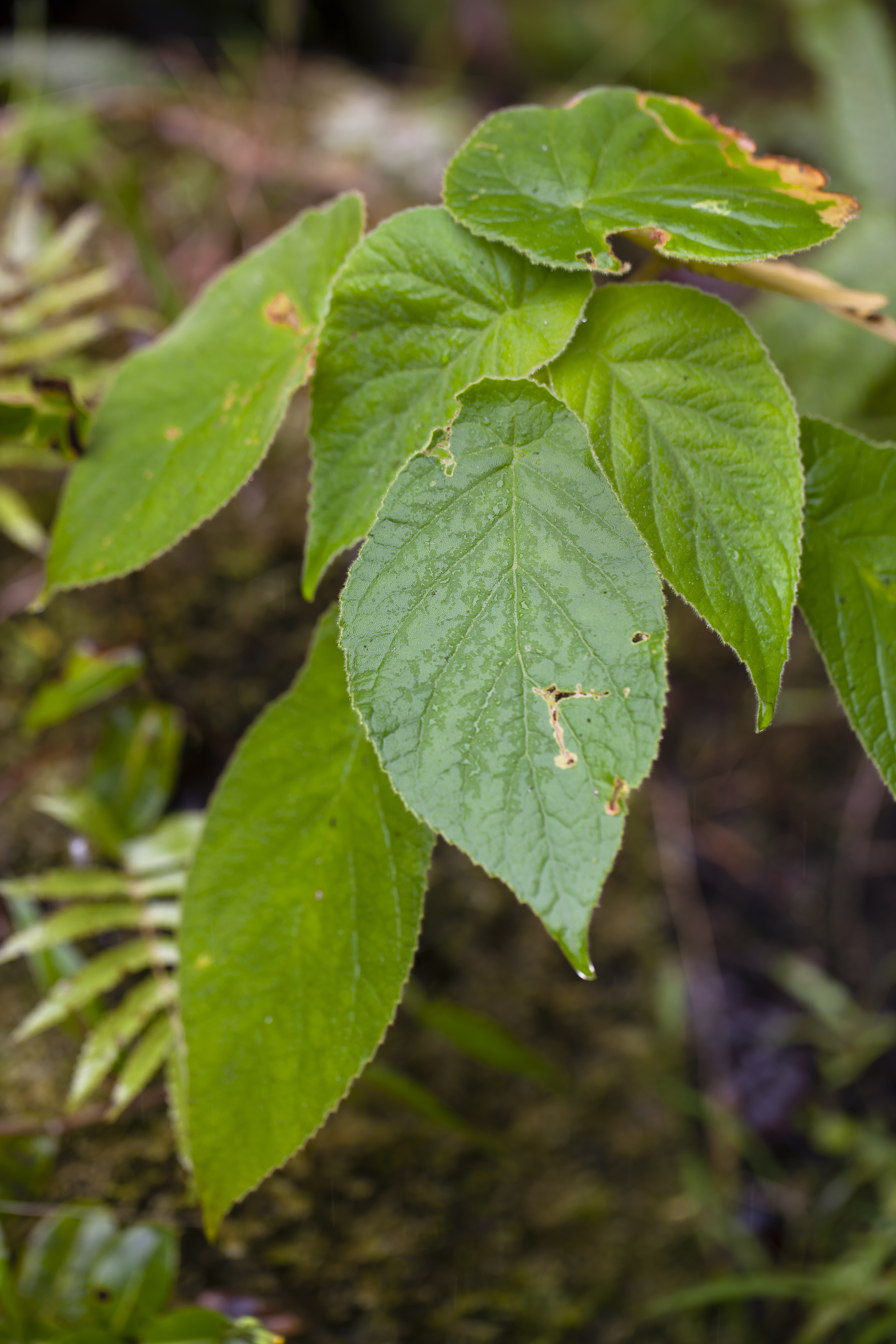
- Habit

Conservation status
- Endangered (IUCN 3.1)

Scientific classification
- Kingdom: Plantae
- Clade: Tracheophytes
- Clade: Angiosperms
- Clade: Eudicots
- Clade: Asterids
- Order: Lamiales
- Family: Gesneriaceae
- Genus: Cyrtandra
- Species: C. wawrae

Binomial name
- Cyrtandra wawrae C.B.Clarke

Synonyms
- Cyrtandra clypeata H.St.John; Cyrtandra haupuensis H.St.John; Cyrtandra peltata Wawra

= Cyrtandra wawrae =

Species of plant in the gesneriad family

Cyrtandra wawrae, the rockface cyrtandra, is a species of flowering plant in the family Gesneriaceae, native to Kauai, Hawaii. A shrub reaching 10 ft (3 m), it is often found growing on rock walls.

== Conservation ==
It is listed as endangered on the IUCN Red List.
