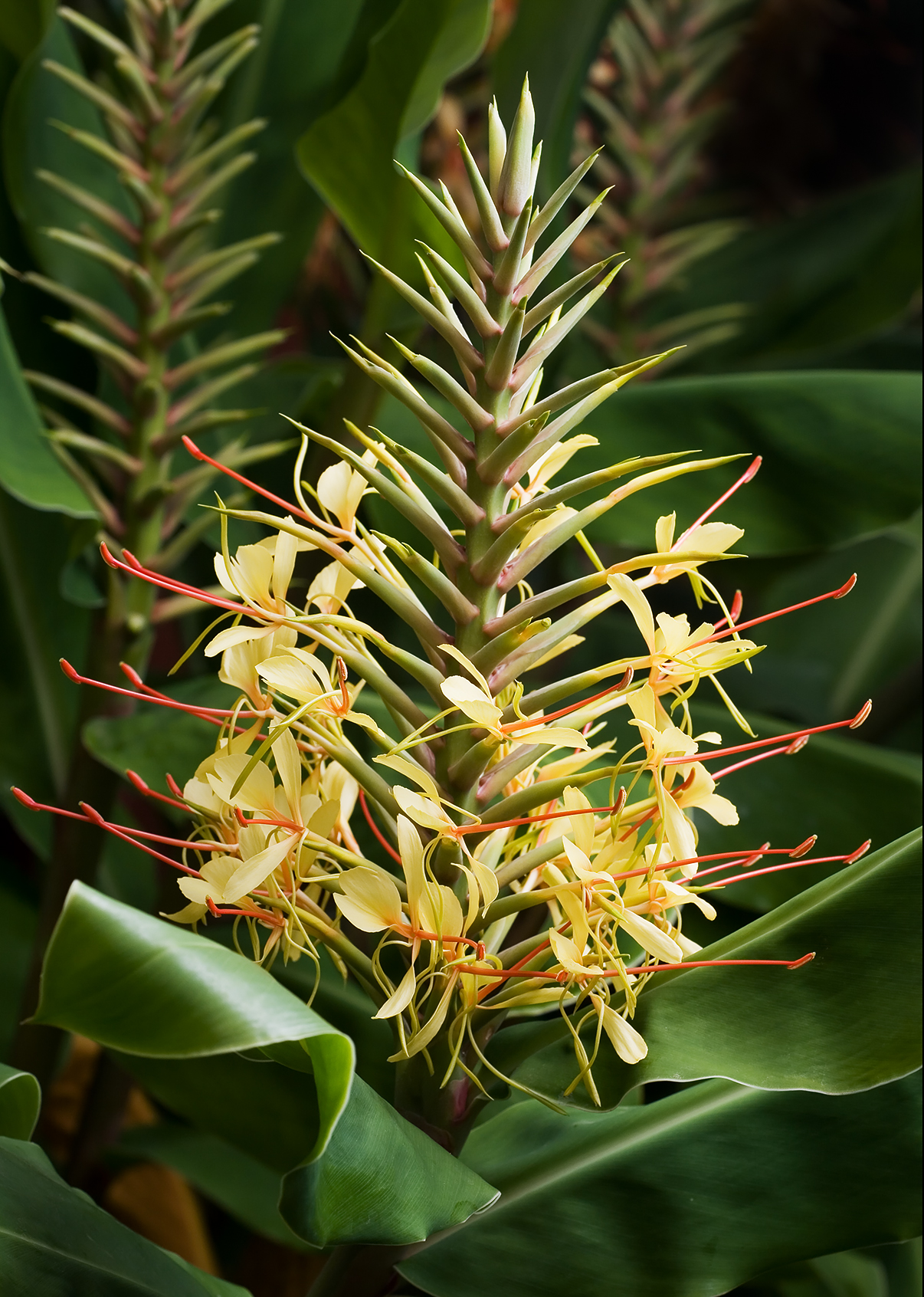

Scientific classification
- Kingdom: Plantae
- Clade: Tracheophytes
- Clade: Angiosperms
- Clade: Monocots
- Clade: Commelinids
- Order: Zingiberales
- Family: Zingiberaceae
- Genus: Hedychium
- Species: H. gardnerianum

Binomial name
- Hedychium gardnerianum Sheppard ex Ker Gawl.

= Hedychium gardnerianum =

Species of flowering plant

Hedychium gardnerianum, the Kahili ginger, Kahila garland-lily or ginger lily, is a species of flowering plant in the ginger family Zingiberaceae, native to the Himalayas in India, Nepal, and Bhutan. It is an erect herbaceous perennial growing to 8 ft (2.4 m) tall with long, bright green leaves clasping the tall stems. The very fragrant pale yellow and red flowers are held in dense spikes above the foliage. They appear towards the end of summer.

== Cultivation ==
Hedychium gardnerianum is cultivated as an ornamental plant in gardens and parks. It prefers a warm tropical climate, although it can thrive in sub-tropical and temperate regions as it tolerates occasional frosts. In the UK it has been given the Royal Horticultural Society's Award of Garden Merit. It is best grown in a warm, sheltered spot where temperatures do not fall below freezing, and is given a deep mulch during the winter months. Alternatively it can be grown under glass in a well-lit conservatory or greenhouse.

== Invasive species ==
The plant is a serious invasive species in certain areas. It is known as 'wild kahili ginger' and is listed as a weed of concern on conservation land in New Zealand, Hawaii, South Africa and the Azores.

It has been recognized as one of "100 of the World's Worst Invasive Alien Species" by the IUCN Invasive Species Specialist Group (ISSG).

== Control as a weed ==
In areas where Hedychium gardnerianum is not of a concern, it may still require control depending on the environment, and its potential as an invasive species in the long term. The simplest way to reduce spread is monitoring. Removal of flower heads before they set seed, and monitoring spread of the rhizomes in these situations will enable Hedychium gardnerianum to be managed in cooler temperate climates such as in the United Kingdom.

In tropical, or sub-tropical climates however, Hedychium gardnerianum can quickly colonise untended areas. Its sticky seeds are easily spread by birds and roaming mammals, while rhizomes crowd out native seedlings by forming dense mats. Without human intervention, it can colonise large areas quickly as each rhizome adds at least one segment per season depending on climatic and light conditions.

The methods mentioned above may give some control over any particular clump but will not resolve the problem. Each year, Hedychium gardnerianum's rhizomes increase the surface area of a particular area, whether the flowers are removed or not. Complete removal of the rhizomes or poisoning, (usually before flowers are matured), is the only certain way of controlling the plant if it is considered a weed. When Hedychium gardnerianum is particularly virulent, annual follow up is required for some years to prevent re-infestation. Re-infestation may occur from spreading by neighbouring plants, or dormant seeds disturbed by the removal of the original tuber clump as seeds remain viable for 2–4 years. Lifted rhizomes should be removed from site as if left in contact with soil they will restore themselves.

== Medicinal research ==
Medicinal research indicates that the plant compound, villosin, in Hedychium gardnerianum has potent cytotoxicity activity against human small cell lung cancer cells.

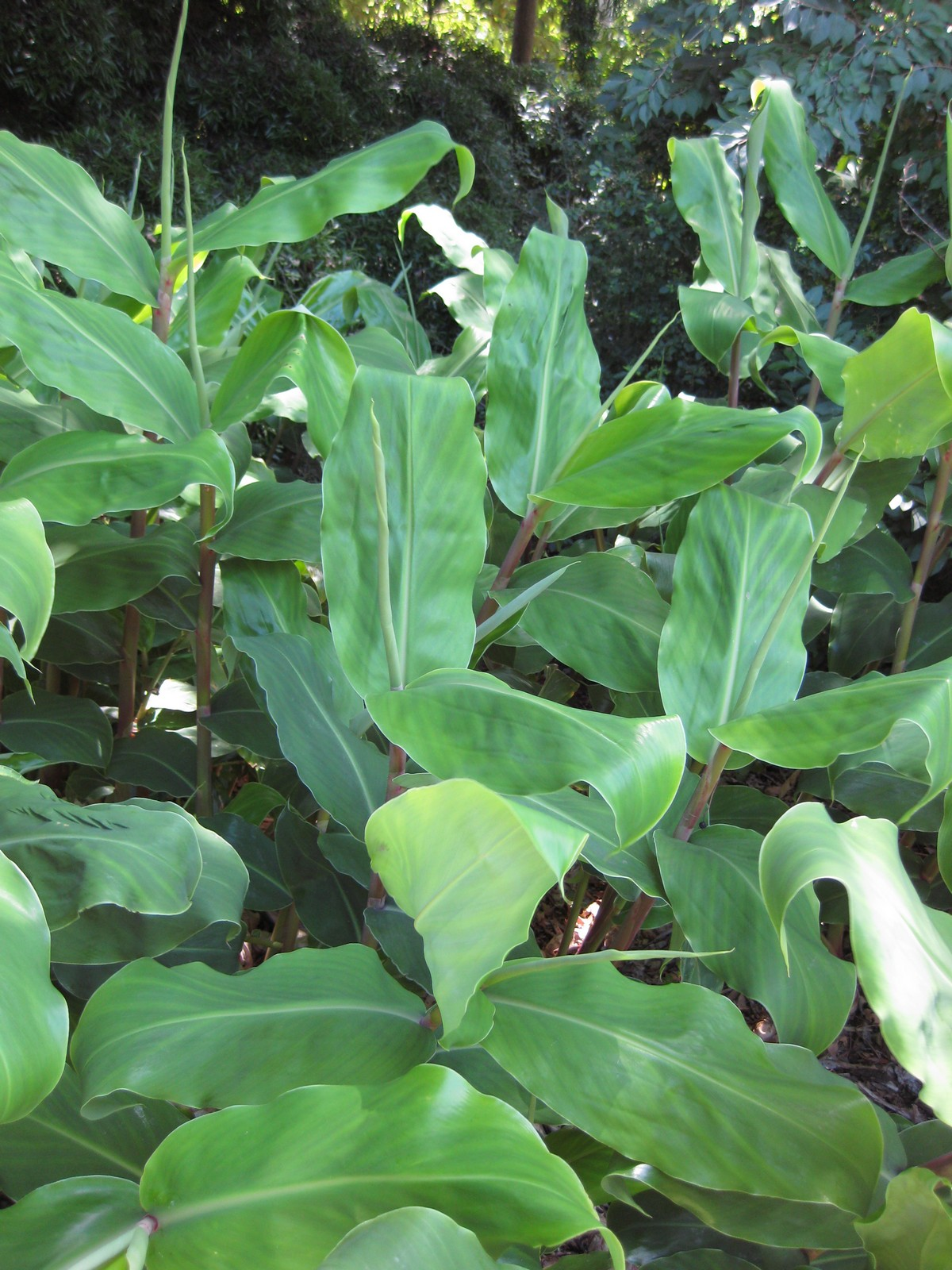

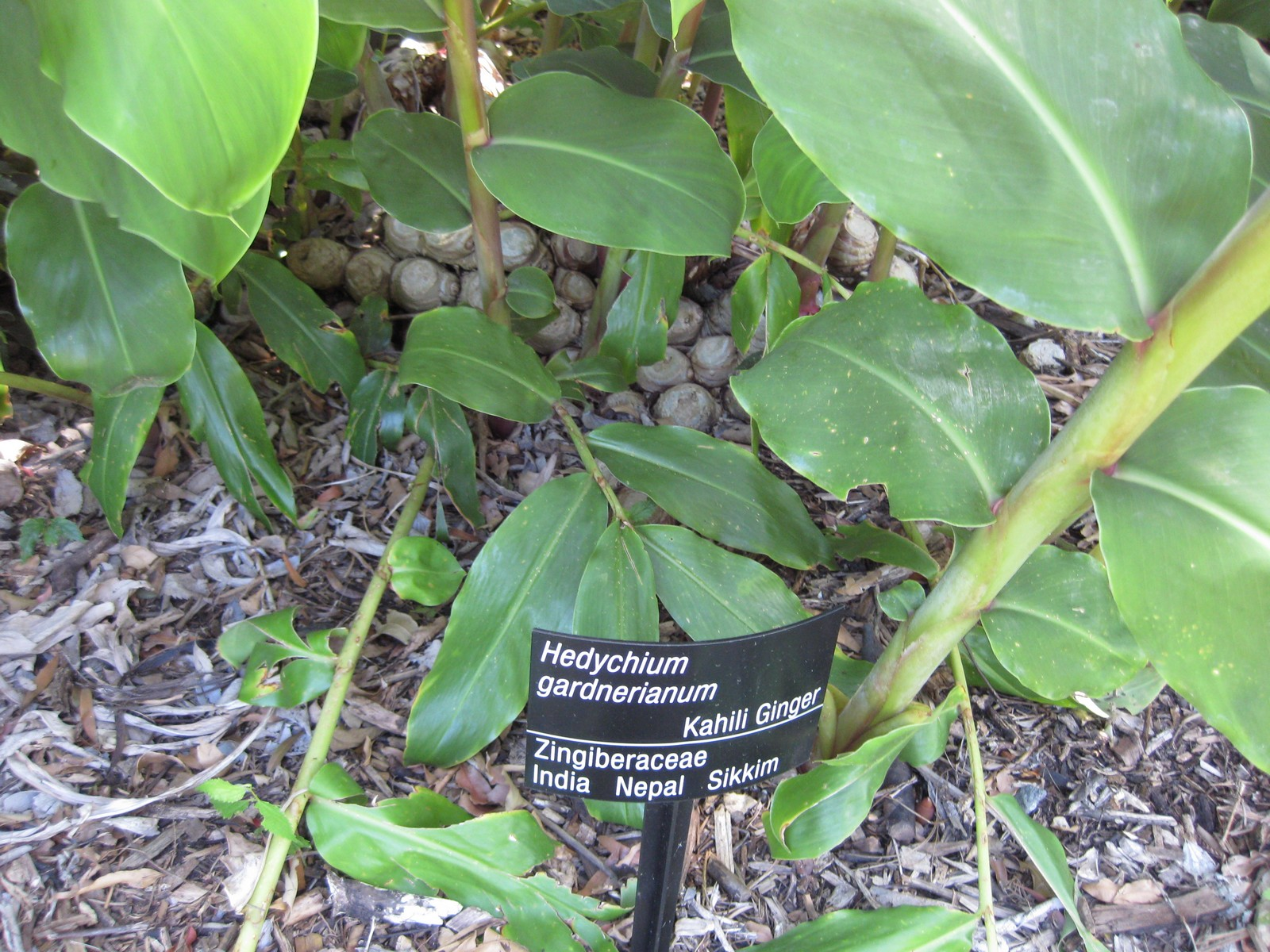

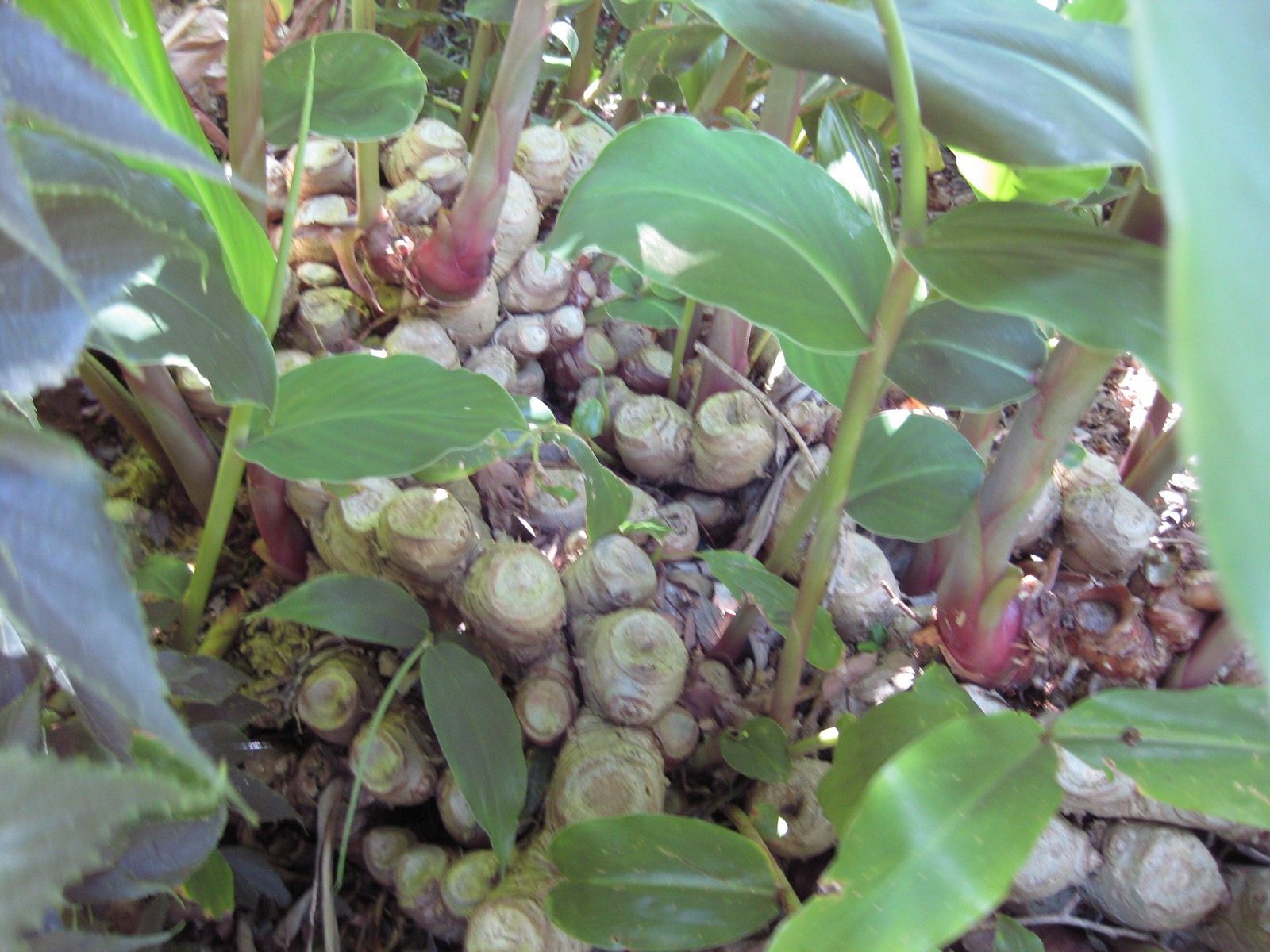

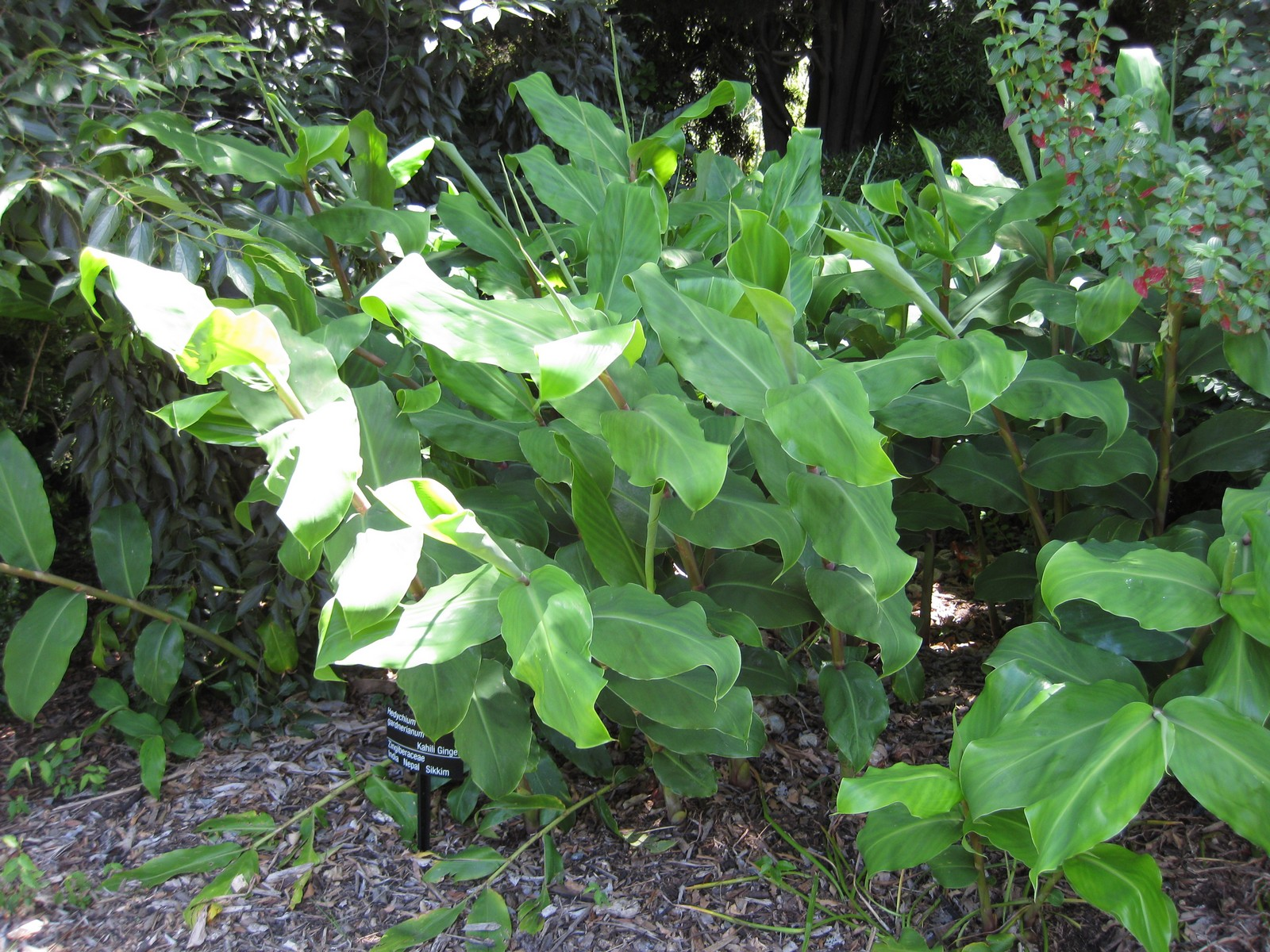
