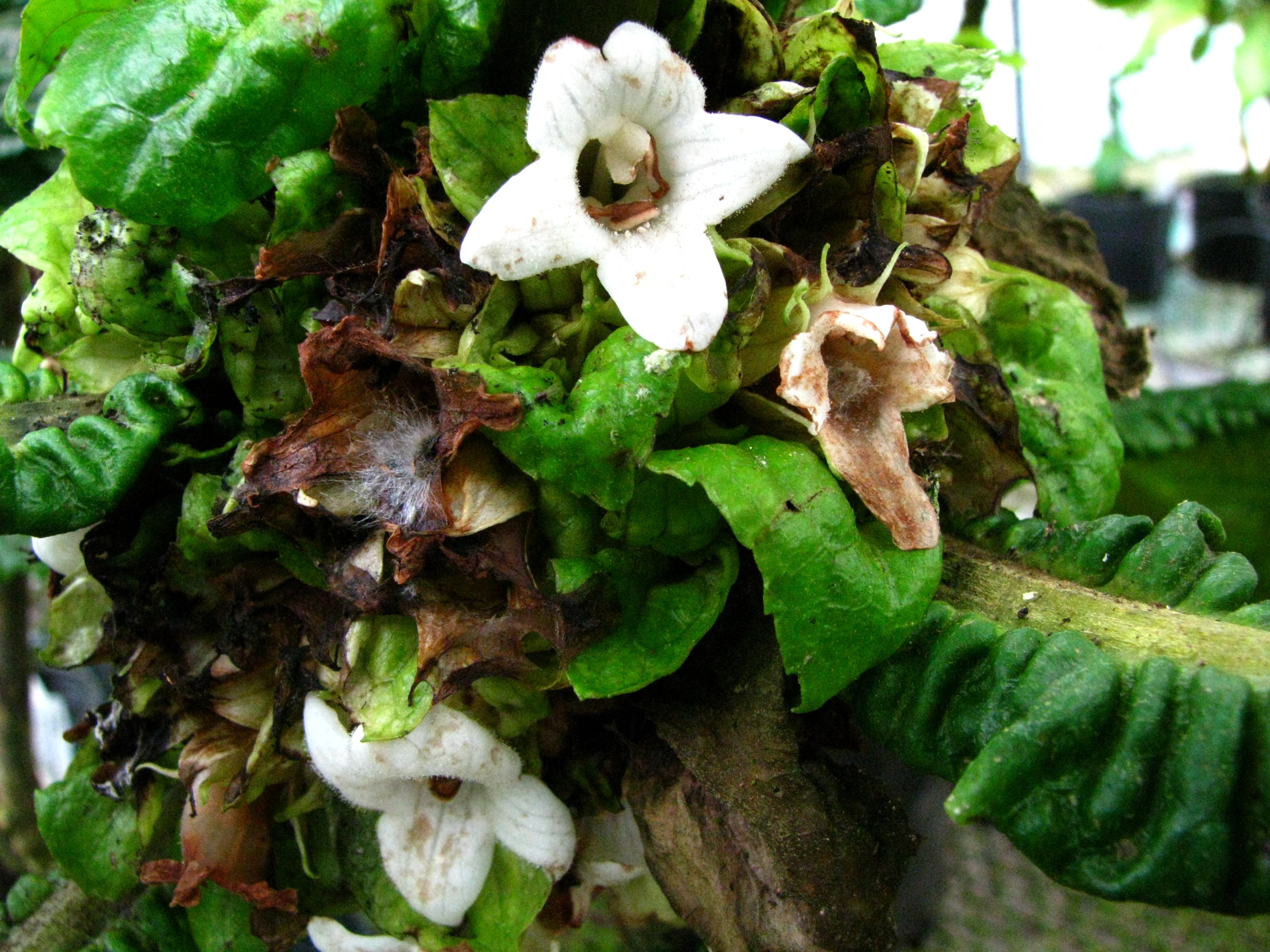
- Cyrtandra cyaneoides

Scientific classification
- Kingdom: Plantae
- Clade: Tracheophytes
- Clade: Angiosperms
- Clade: Eudicots
- Clade: Asterids
- Order: Lamiales
- Family: Gesneriaceae
- Subfamily: Didymocarpoideae
- Genus: Cyrtandra; J.R.Forst. & G.Forst. (1776)

Species
- 600+, see list

Synonyms
- Cinga Noronha (1790), nom. nud.; Cyrtandroidea F.Br. (1935); Cyrtandropsis Lauterb. (1910); Getonia Banks & Sol. ex Benn. (1840), nom. illeg.; Kyrtandra J.F.Gmel. (1791), orth. var.; Macuerus Rumph. ex Bosc (1803); Protocyrtandra Hosok. (1934); Rhynchocarpus Reinw. ex Blume (1823), not validly publ.; Whitia Blume (1823)

= Cyrtandra (plant) =

Genus of flowering plants

Cyrtandra (Neo-Latin, from Greek κυρτός, kyrtós, "curved", and ἀνήρ, anḗr, "male", in reference to their prominently curved stamens) is a genus of flowering plants containing about 600 species, with more being discovered often, and is thus the largest genus in the family Gesneriaceae. These plants are native to Southeast Asia, Australia, and the Pacific Islands, with the centre of diversity in Southeast Asia and the Malesian region. The genus is common, but many species within it are very rare, localized, and endangered endemic plants. The species can be difficult to identify because they are highly polymorphic and because they readily hybridize with each other. The plants may be small herbs, vines, shrubs, epiphytes, or trees. The genus is characterized in part by having two stamens, and most species have white flowers, with a few red-, orange-, yellow-, and pink-flowered species known. Almost all species live in rainforest habitats.

It is an example of a supertramp genus.

Hawaiian Cyrtandra are known as ha‘iwale.

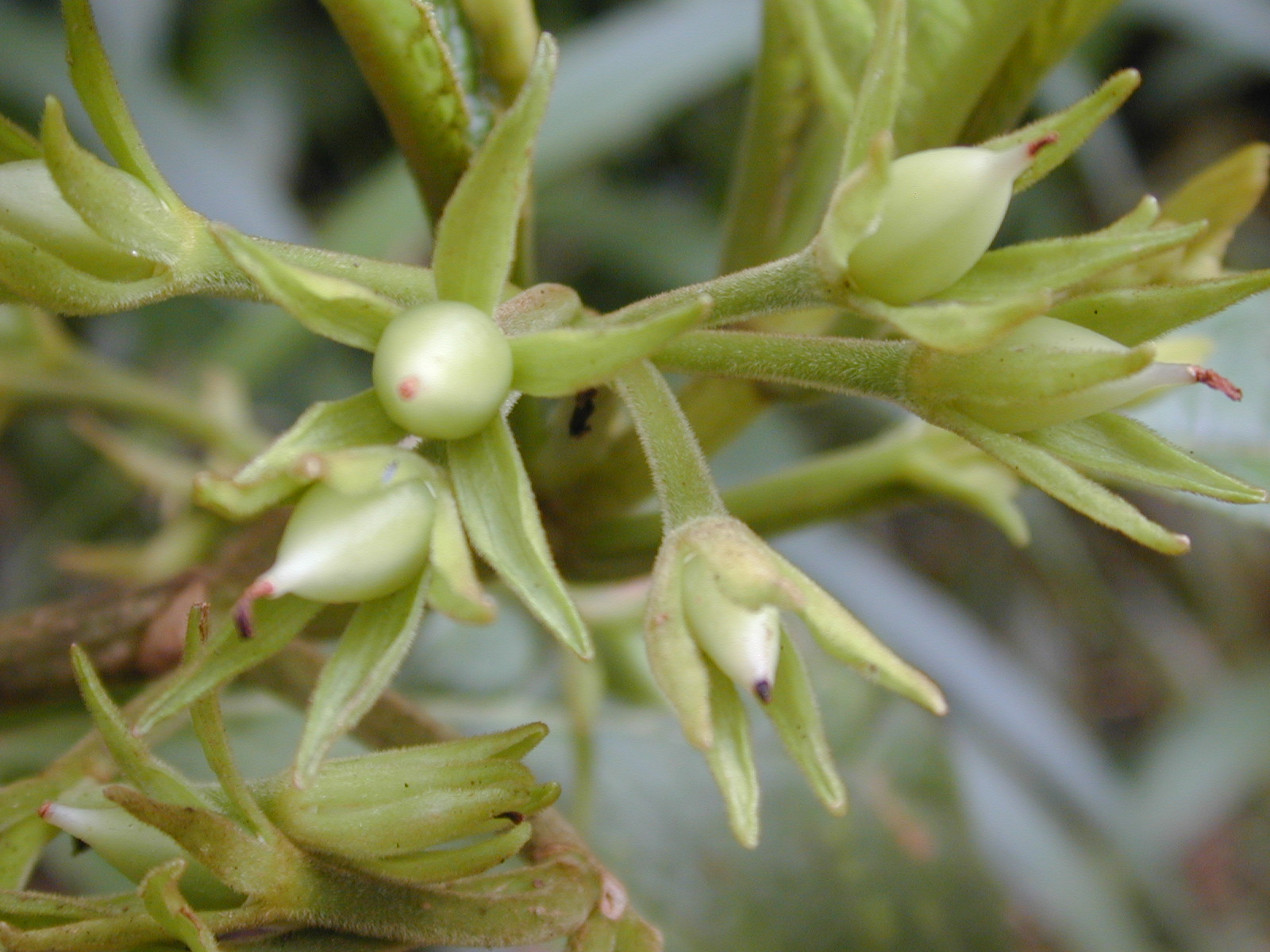
Cyrtandra platyphylla

== Species ==
Selected species include:

- Cyrtandra argentii
- Cyrtandra calyptribracteata
- Cyrtandra cleopatrae
- Cyrtandra crenata – Kahana Valley cyrtandra
- Cyrtandra cyaneoides – mapele
- Cyrtandra dentata – mountain cyrtandra
- Cyrtandra elegans
- Cyrtandra giffardii – forest cyrtandra
- Cyrtandra heinrichii – lava cyrtandra
- Cyrtandra laxiflora – Oahu cyrtandra
- Cyrtandra munroi – Lanaihale cyrtandra
- Cyrtandra oenobarba – shaggystem cyrtandra
- Cyrtandra paliku – cliffside cyrtandra
- Cyrtandra paludosa – kanaweo ke'oke'o
- Cyrtandra platyphylla – 'ilihia
- Cyrtandra polyantha – Niu Valley cyrtandra
- Cyrtandra subumbellata – parasol cyrtandra
- Cyrtandra tintinnabula – Laupahoehoe cyrtandra
- Cyrtandra viridiflora – greenleaf cyrtandra
- Cyrtandra waiolani – fuzzyflower cyrtandra
- Cyrtandra wawrae – rockface cyrtandra
