= Papilio natewa =

Natewa swallowtail

Conservation status
- Vulnerable (IUCN 3.1)

Scientific classification
- Kingdom: Animalia
- Phylum: Arthropoda
- Class: Insecta
- Order: Lepidoptera
- Family: Papilionidae
- Genus: Papilio
- Species: P. natewa

Binomial name
- Papilio natewa Tennent, Chandra & Müller, 2018

Species of butterfly

Papilio natewa, commonly known as the Natewa swallowtail, is a species of swallowtail butterfly in the family Papilionidae. It is endemic to the Natewa Peninsula of Vanua Levu, Fiji. Described in 2018 by John Tennent, Visheshni Chandra, and Chris J. Müller, it was identified from photographs sent to researchers by ornithologist Greg Kerr. Its discovery was remarkable due to how little-known the butterfly had been prior to its discovery, despite its showy appearance. It is one of three native swallowtails found in the region.

The Natewa swallowtail has an extremely limited range, and is one of the most range-restricted members of its family. Pressures have been exerted on the population due to development in the area, in addition to collectors who descended upon the island for the purposes of capturing their own specimens. Initiatives in protecting the Natewa Peninsula area, in addition to proposed breeding programmes by the locals can perhaps aid in preserving the Natewa swallowtail. It is currently listed as Vulnerable by the International Union for Conservation of Nature.

== Discovery ==
First photographed by an Australian ornithologist named Greg Kerr, who was working with Operation Wallacea, a foundation supporting school students in science projects, originally found the swallowtail on the island of Vanua Levu's Natewa Peninsula at the site of a former logging track. Kerr's photograph was circulated among researchers who could not identify the butterfly from his observation. Its discovery was noted as remarkable by John Tennent, a scientific associate working at the Natural History Museum, London, due to the showy appearance of the butterfly compared to the other related butterflies in the Pacific region. The butterfly seemingly did not match with what was known about the diversity of butterflies in the wider Pacific region. The butterfly's discovery was described as a "once-in-a-lifetime discovery", Tennent himself described the discovery as "easily the most spectacular" of the butterflies that he had described. Tennent led the first expedition to find more individuals of Papilio natewa, of which allowed the proper description of the butterfly as a distinct species. Tennent published the first description of the butterfly in the journal Nachrichten des Entomologischen Vereins Apollo.

== Taxonomy ==
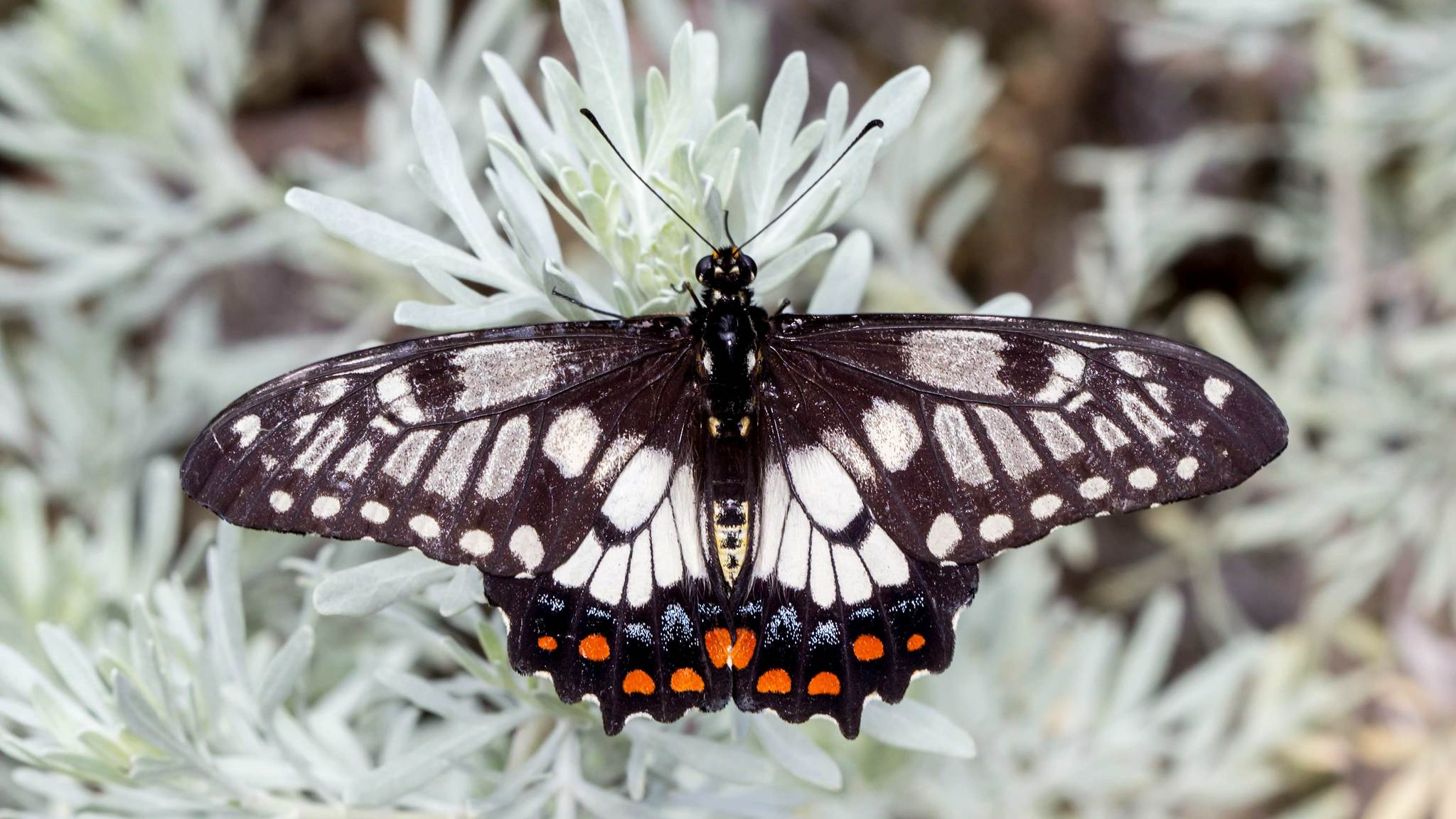
Genetic analysis suggests that one of the Natewa swallowtail's closest relatives is the dainty swallowtail (Papilio anactus)

Genetic analysis suggests a close relative of Papilio natewa is Papilio anactus found in Australia. Genetic testing by Fabien L. Condamine et al. notes that it is one of two members in the Papilio subgenus Eleppone, alongside P. anactus. Subgenus Eleppone is closest related to subgenus Araminta in Clade 3b of Papilio.

It is commonly known as the "Natewa swallowtail".

== Description ==
Papilio natewa has a wingspan of 8 centimetres (3.1 in). Two elongated tails project from its hindwings. At the top of the forewings marks a striking black and white zigzag pattern. Underneath there is a cream and black speckled pattern. Additionally, blue eyespots and a soft yellow color marks the wings.

The life history for the Natewa swallowtail is currently poorly known. The butterfly has multiple generations year round. Populations of the Natewa swallowtail appear to increase following the rainy season in July and August. The adult butterflies have been observed feeding on the nectar of Stachytarpheta flowers, which are not native to the island.

== Distribution ==
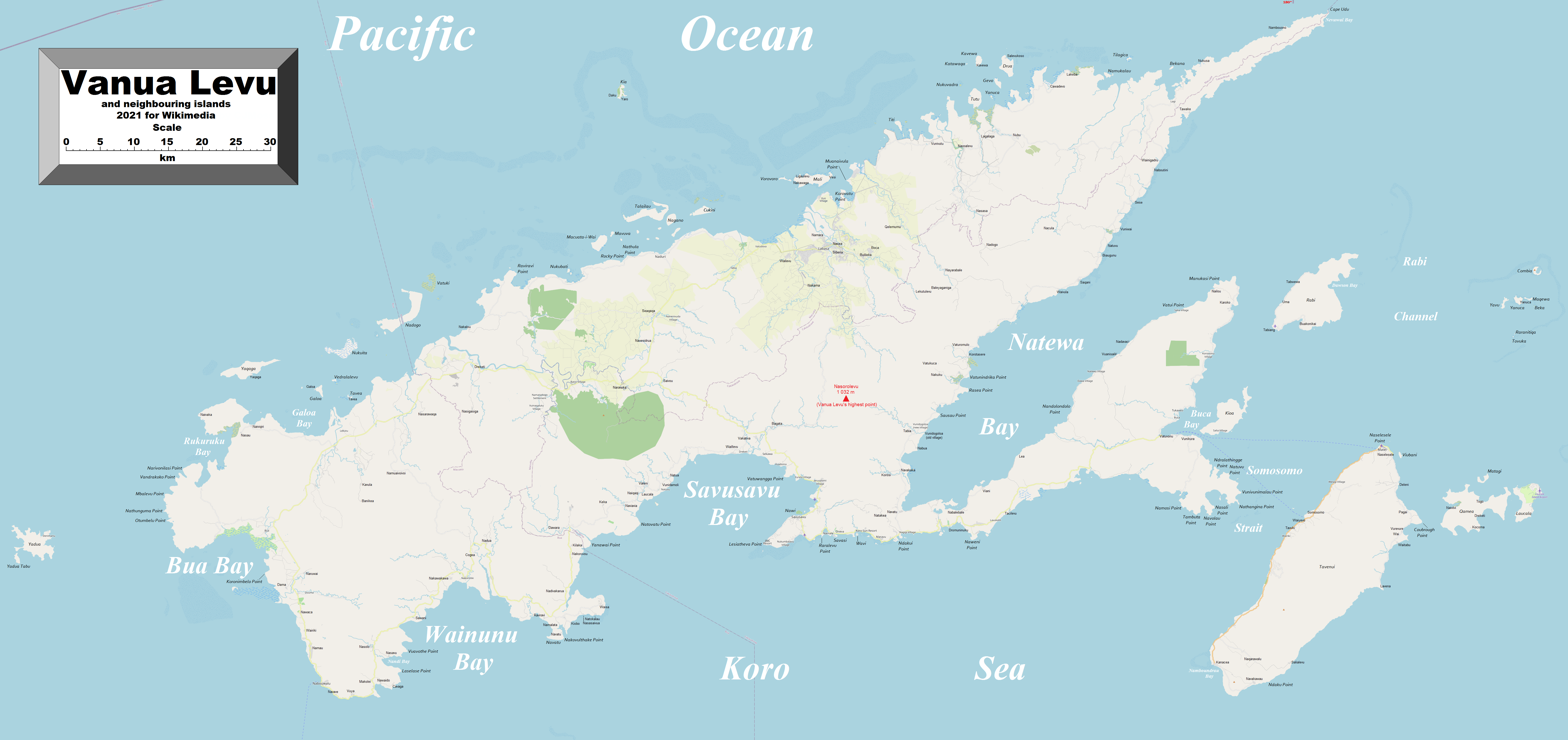
The Natewa swallowtail is endemic to the island of Vanua Levu (pictured), the Natewa Peninsula is on the bottom right.

Papilio natewa is found on the island of Vanua Levu in the country of Fiji. It is one of three species of swallowtail butterfly found in the region, alongside Papilio schmeltzi (Fiji), and Papilio godeffroyi (Samoa). Its distribution on the island is entirely confined to the Natewa Peninsula. This extremely limited distribution makes it one of the most range restricted members of the family Papilionidae on Earth.

=== Habitat ===
The swallowtail's habitat was presumed as to why it was left undiscovered for quite some time. Papilio natewa inhabits forests at an elevation of 250 metres (820 ft). The Natewa swallowtail stays strictly in its forest habitat, flying into or out of dense forest for the purposes of feeding or courtship. This is unlike other swallowtails, who do not solely inhabit the forest like Papilio natewa does. The Natewa Peninsula itself, where the butterfly was first found at, has a fairly scientifically unknown ecology.

== Threats and conservation ==
The Natewa swallowtail is currently listed as Vulnerable as per the IUCN Red List 3.1. Conservation efforts by the inhabitants of Natewa, Fiji in the form of the Nambu Conservation Trust, aided by Operation Wallacea, currently works to preserve the forest habitat of Papilio natewa. In addition, locals are keen on setting up a breeding program dedicated to the preservation of the local swallowtail species. Funding challenges currently impede the endeavor, but the project has been highlighted for its potential as a draw for ecotourists.

The IUCN listed threats to its habitat such as logging and the harvest of wood, the harvest of crops, and wood and pulp plantations. Another threat to the Natewa swallowtail would be potential overcollection by butterfly collectors, coupled with its limited range, which can prove concerning for the Natewa swallowtail's population stability. Weeks after the initial publication of the species description by Tennent et al., a collector with twelve specimens of the Natewa swallowtail was caught. Collectors from New Zealand, China, and Japan descended on the island to collect the butterfly, but were turned away by locals who showed no interest in helping them.

== Etymology ==
Papilio natewa is named after the Natewa Peninsula in Fiji, where the first specimen was found.
