= List of butterflies of New Caledonia =

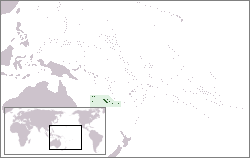
Location of New Caledonia

This is a list of butterflies of New Caledonia. The total number of Lepidoptera species on New Caledonia is 521 in 304 genera (with 197 endemic species in 17 genera). The total number of butterflies is 72 in 42 genera.

== Papilionidae ==
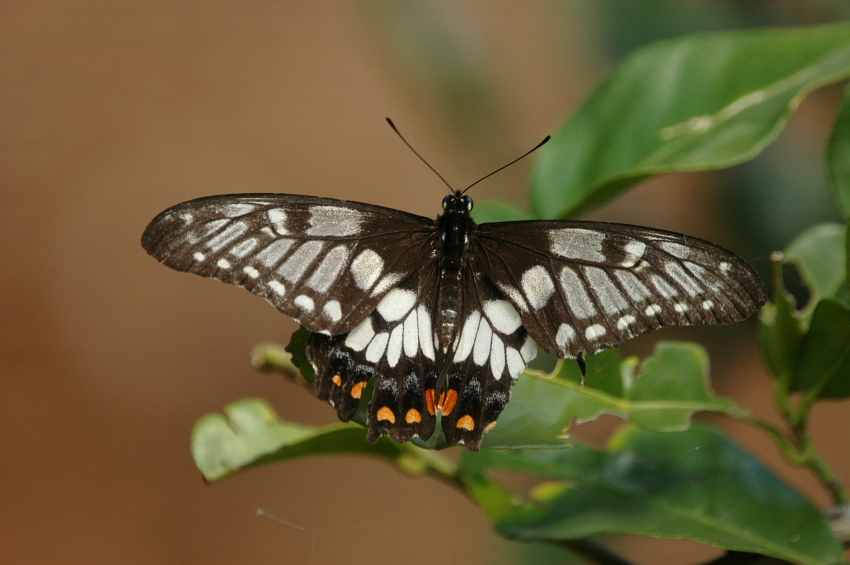
Papilio anactus

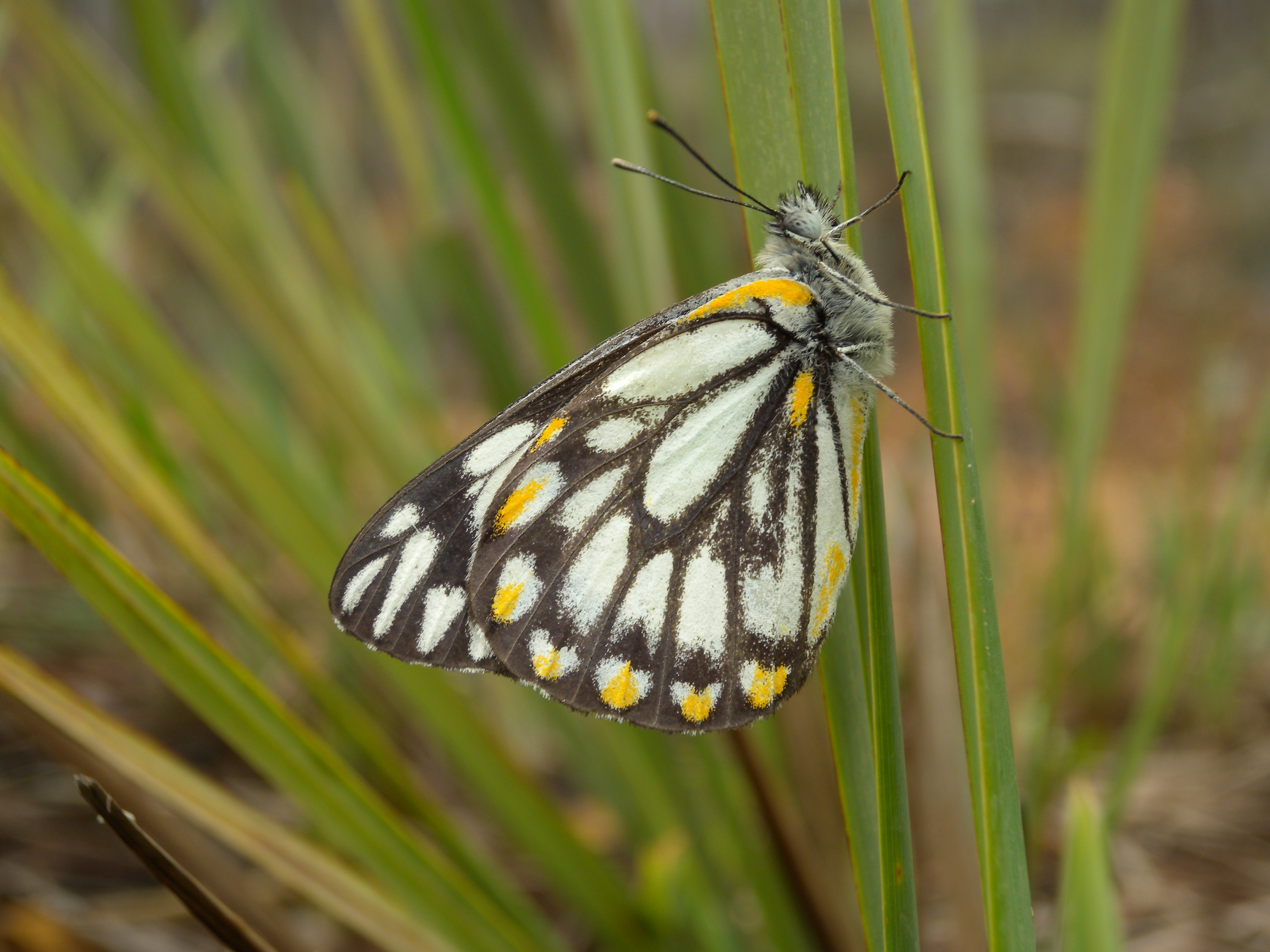
Belenois java

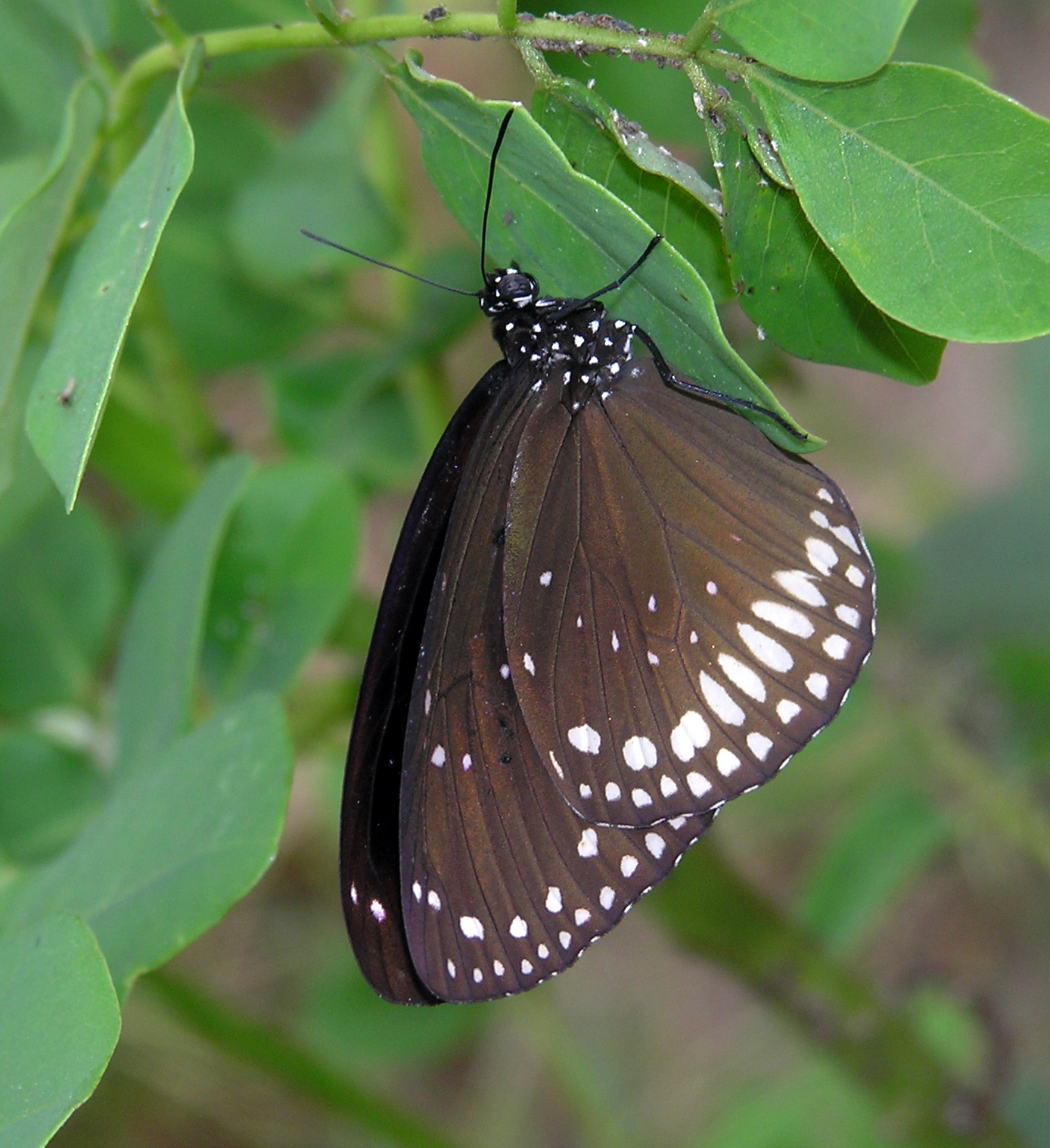
Euploea sylvester

=== Papilioninae ===
- Graphium gelon
- Papilio amyntor syn. Papilio ilioneus
- Papilio anactus
- Papilio montrouzieri

== Pieridae ==
=== Coliadinae ===
- Catopsilia pomona
- Catopsilia pyranthe
- Eurema brigitta
- Eurema hecabe

=== Pierinae ===
- Appias albina
- Appias paulina
- Belenois java
- Cepora perimale
- Delias ellipsis
- Delias nysa
- Elodina pseudanops
- Elodina signata
- Pieris rapae

== Lycaenidae ==
=== Polyommatinae ===
- Euchrysops cnejus
- Everes lacturnus
- Jamides carissima
- Lampides boeticus
- Leptotes plinius
- Nacaduba biocellata
- Nacaduba deplorans
- Nothodanis schaeffera
- Prosotas patricae
- Psychonotis purpurea
- Theclinesthes petersi
- Udara renevieri
- Zizina labradus
- Zizula hylax

=== Theclinae ===
- Deudorix epijarbas

== Nymphalidae ==
=== Charaxinae ===
- Polyura clitarchus
- Polyura gamma

=== Cyrestinae ===
- Cyrestis whitmei

=== Danainae ===
- Danaus affinis
- Danaus chrysippus
- Danaus plexippus
- Euploea algea
- Euploea boisduvali
- Euploea core
- Euploea helcita
- Euploea leucostictos
- Euploea lewinii
- Euploea sylvester
- Euploea treitschkei
- Euploea tulliolus
- Parantica pumila
- Tirumala hamata

=== Heliconiinae ===
- Acraea andromacha
- Vagrans egista

=== Libytheinae ===
- Libythea geoffroy

=== Nymphalinae ===
- Doleschallia bisaltide denisi
- Doleschallia tongana
- Hypolimnas alimena catalai
- Hypolimnas antilope shortlandia
- Hypolimnas bolina
- Hypolimnas misippus
- Hypolimnas octocula
- Junonia villida
- Vanessa cardui
- Vanessa itea
- Vanessa kershawi
- Yoma sabina

=== Satyrinae ===
- Austroypthima petersi
- Melanitis leda
- Paratisiphone lyrnessa

== Hesperiidae ==
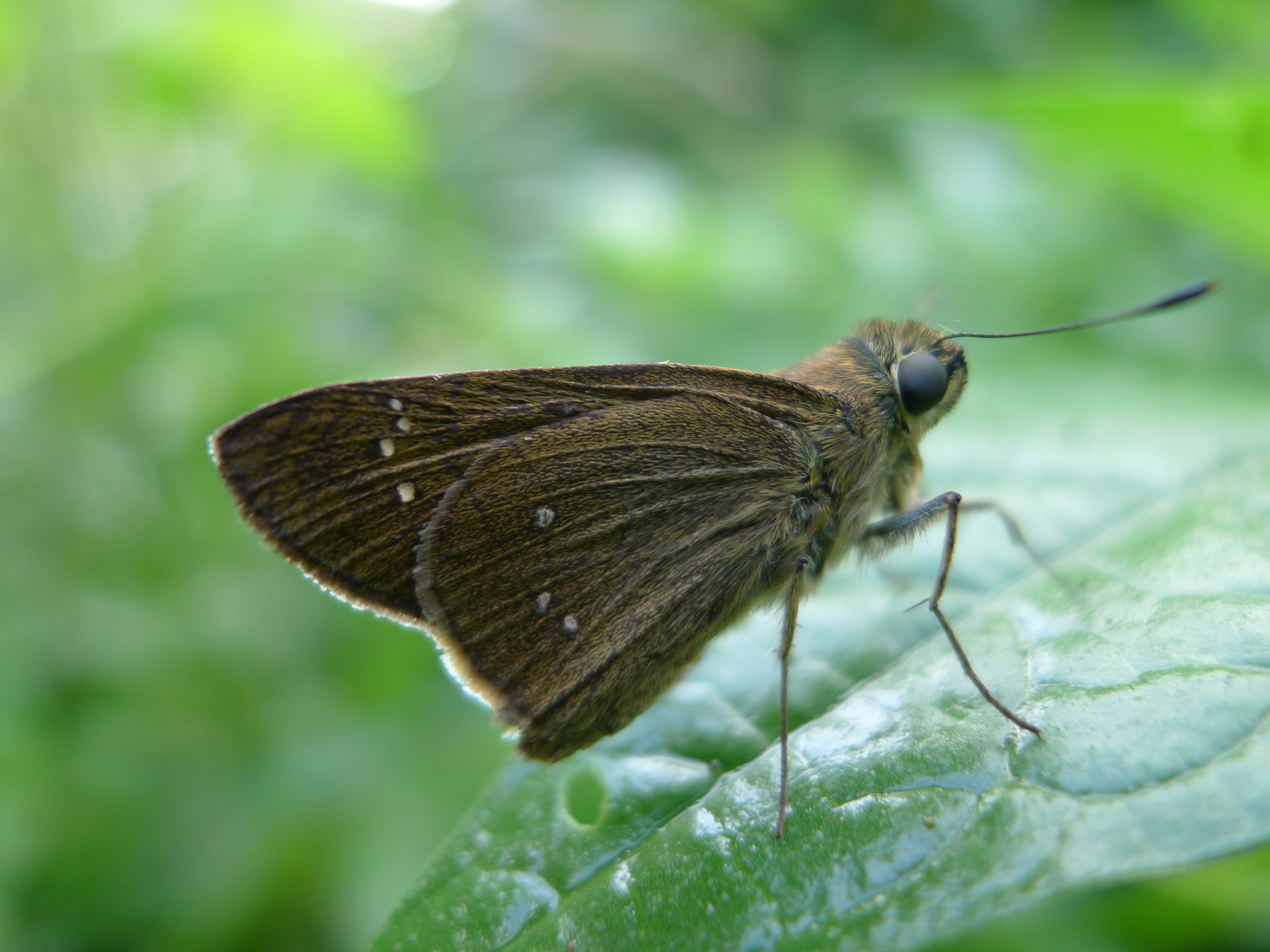
Borbo cinnara

=== Coeliadinae ===
- Badamia atrox
- Badamia exclamationis
- Hasora khoda

=== Hesperiidae ===
- Borbo cinnara
- Borbo impar

== Sources ==
- endemia.nc
- funet
- biodiversité et conservatoire en Outre-Mer
