= Mount Fito =

Mountain in Samoa

- Location within Samoa

Highest point
- Elevation: 1,149 m (3,770 ft)
- Prominence: 149 m (489 ft)
- Coordinates: 13.941°S 171.696°W

Geography
- Location: Samoa

Mount Fito (Mauga Fito) is the second-highest mountain on the island of Upolu in Samoa. It is located in the O Le Pupu-Puʿe National Park in the Atua district and has a height of 1149m. Fito was long-believed to be Upolu's highest point, but a visit by the Samoa Conservation Society in 2022 determined it to be the second-highest, just 10m shorter than nearby Mount Vaivai.

In 1978 a Cessna aircraft operated by South Pacific Island Airways crashed into the mountain, killing all 11 people on board.
