= Delias manuselensis =

Scientific classification
- Kingdom: Animalia
- Phylum: Arthropoda
- Clade: Pancrustacea
- Class: Insecta
- Order: Lepidoptera
- Family: Pieridae
- Genus: Delias
- Species: D. manuselensis

Binomial name
- Delias manuselensis Talbot, 1920

Species of butterfly

Delias manuselensis is a butterfly in the family Pieridae. It was described by George Talbot in 1931. It is endemic to the Moluccas (Ceram, Serang and Ambon) in the Australasian realm.

== Description ==
=== Males ===
Upperside—Fore wing white; costa narrowly edged with black, outer margin narrowly bordered with black from apex to vein 3, distal ends of veins 2-7 black. Hind wing white.

Underside.—Fore wing white, 26–29 mm; apex and outer margin broadly dull purplish-bronze to below vein 2, and bearing near the margin a row of six white spots; the anterior two or three spots are tinged with yellow, all are rounded, the upper three more ovate, the lower spot much smaller than the others. The distal margin of the dark area is invaded by white in cellule 4. The costa is narrowly purplish bronze with some grey and yellow scaling at the base.

The hind wing is deep purplish-bronze. A submarginal series of six pale yellow spots are rounded and slightly pointed distally, their points sometimes touching the margin; cellule 8 powdered with yellow; inner margin to the submedian is sparsely powdered with yellow; a white discal spot formed of some loosely placed white scales along the outer edge of the lower discocellular. The head is grey-black; palpi black, with black and white hair; black antennae; black thorax, with grey hair above and below, the sides include some yellow hair; abdomen black, powdered with white, especially at sides and on ventral surface, claspers white.

=== Females ===
Upperside—Fore wing white, 26–31 mm with blackish-brown apical half; costa narrowly black; base greyish to vein 2 and merging anteriorly into the outer greyish powdering of the apical area; apical area reaching to the submedian and bearing a series of six submarginal white spots, the fourth and fifth the larger, and the sixth smaller; the greyish powdering distally cuts off a white patch outside the end of cell, indented distally, its lower part forms a tooth in cellule 4. Hind wing grey, formed by a thin layer of white scales on a blackish-brown ground; this colouring is darker distally and leaves a more or less extent of black ground-colour in the distal area; a narrow marginal border of grey-white, deeply crenulate on its inner edge.

Underside —Fore wing as above, but dark apical half more sharply defined; base powdered with grey along costa and below the cell, base of cell powdered with yellow. Hind wing as in the male. Head and appendages, thorax, and abdomen are as in the male.

== Habitat ==
Its habitat is the Central Ceram, Mount Manusela, 6000 feet, October and November. It was described from 5 males and 7 females.

This species appears to be allied to momea, Bdv., from Java, and to nysa, Fabr., from Australia.

== Taxonomy ==
Delias manuselensis is a member of the Delias nysa species group.
