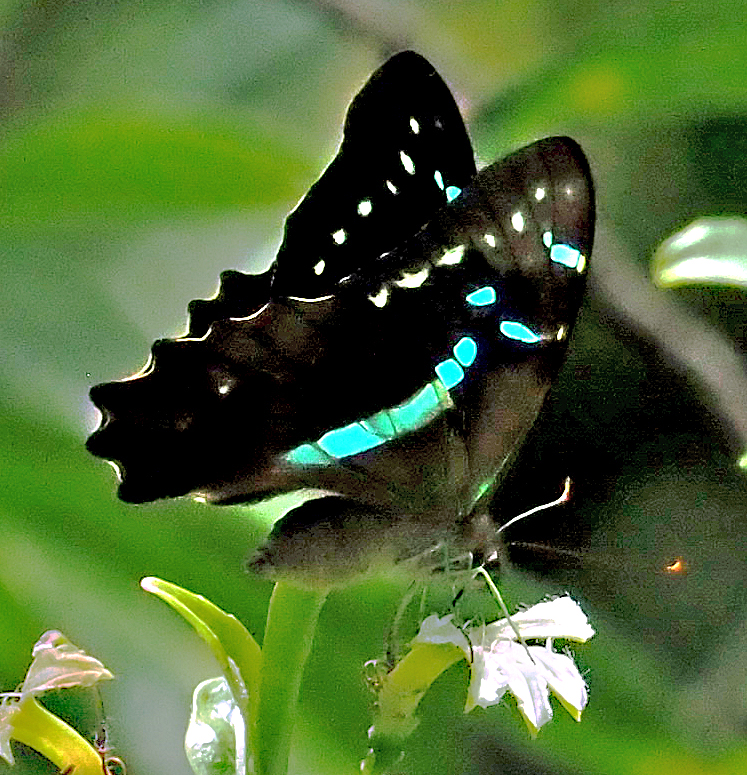

Conservation status
- Least Concern (IUCN 3.1)

Scientific classification
- Kingdom: Animalia
- Phylum: Arthropoda
- Clade: Pancrustacea
- Class: Insecta
- Order: Lepidoptera
- Family: Papilionidae
- Genus: Graphium
- Species: G. gelon

Binomial name
- Graphium gelon (Boisduval, 1859)

Synonyms
- Papilio gelon Boisduval, 1859; Papilio megasthenes Mathew, 1889

= Graphium gelon =

Species of butterfly

Graphium gelon is a butterfly of the family Papilionidae. It is found in New Caledonia and the nearby Loyalty Islands.

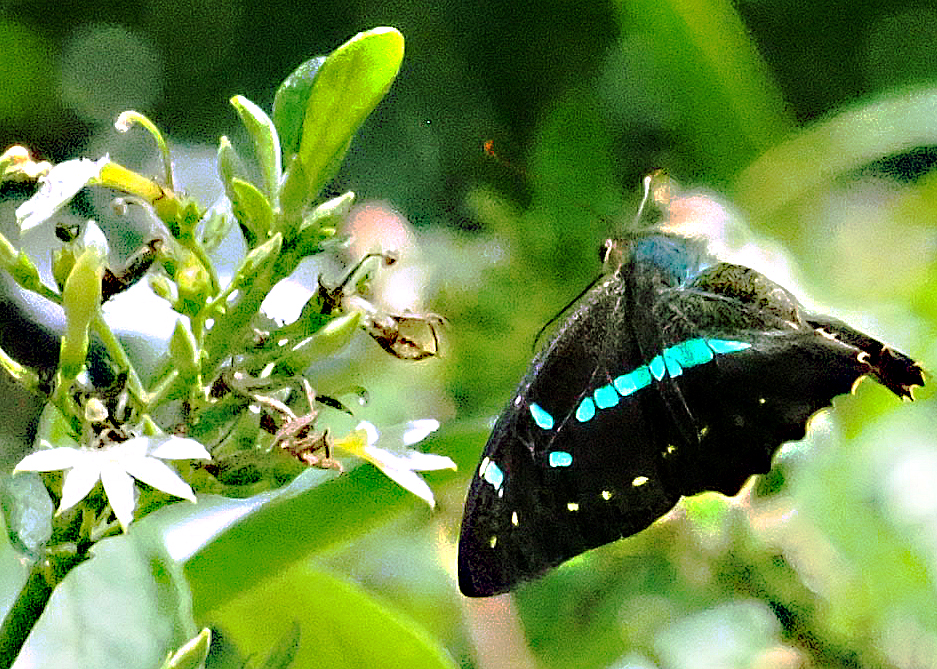

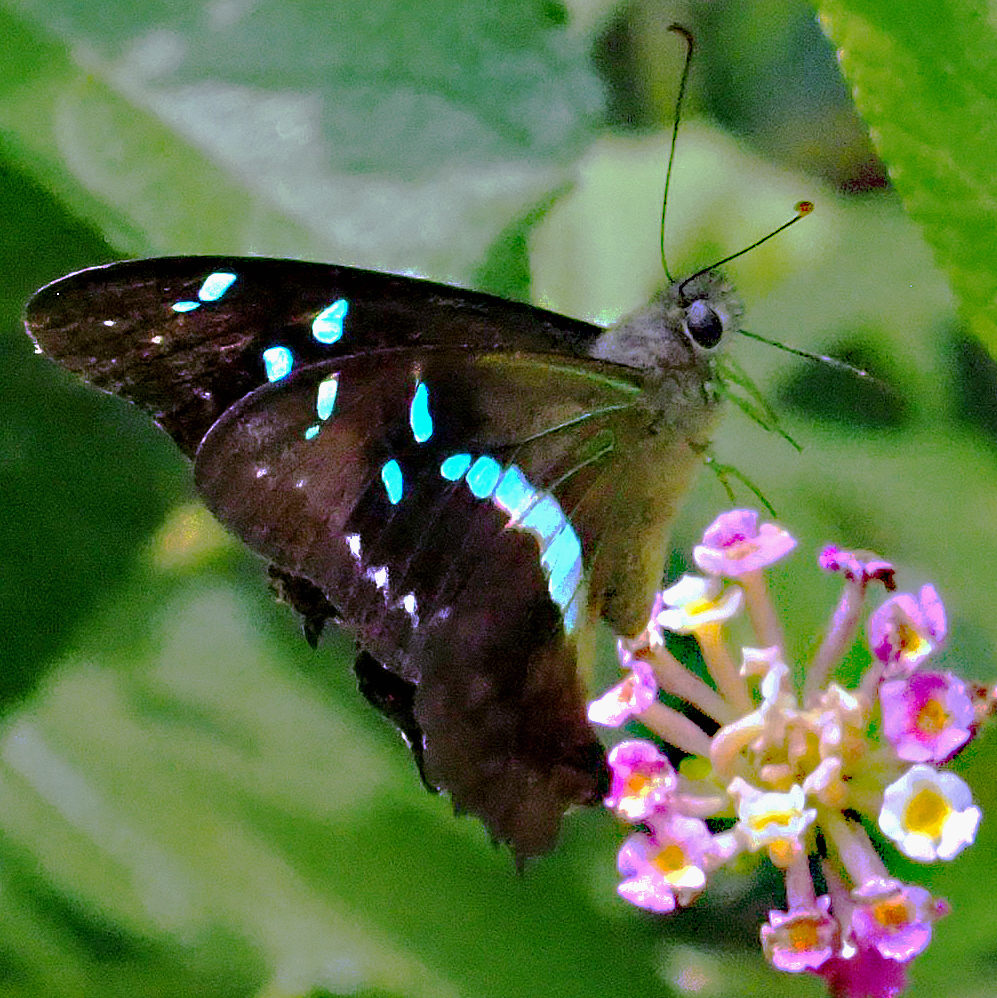

Graphium gelon and related species

== See also ==
- List of butterflies of New Caledonia
- Biodiversity of New Caledonia
