= Samoa Conservation Society =

Samoan environmental organisation

- Sosaiete Faasao o Samoa
- Logo of Samoa Conservation Society
- Established: 2013
- Type: Nonprofit
- Region served: Samoa
- Website: samoaconservationsociety.com

The Samoa Conservation Society (Fa’asao Samoa) is an environmental organisation based in Samoa. Its purpose is to promote the conservation of Samoa’s biological diversity and natural heritage. The society is active in efforts to save the critically-endangered Manumea, Samoa's national bird, and in forest restoration.

The society was established in 2013. Its founding president was Tofilau Tepa Suaesi. Its current president, elected in 2020, is James Atherton.

== Campaigns ==
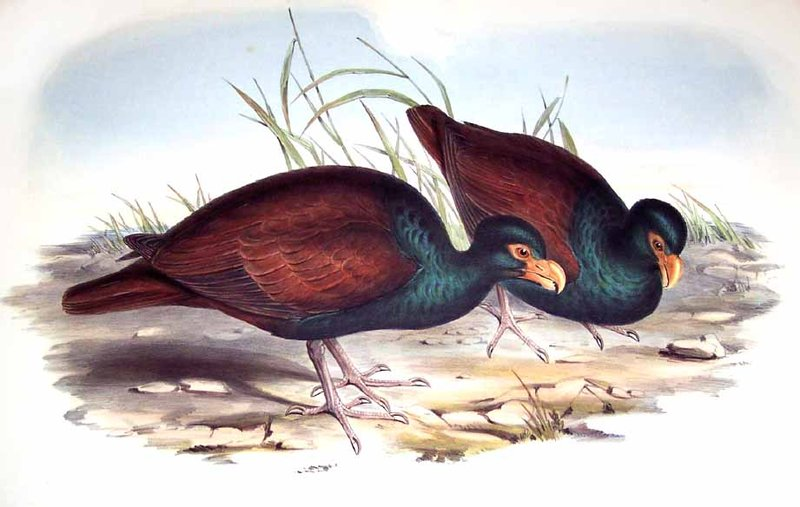
The Manumea

The society's first project was to save the manumea, and included raising awareness of its habitat and conservation status, and monitoring to understand its breeding and feeding habits. In 2017 it led an international campaign with Auckland Zoo and the Ministry of Natural Resources and Environment to try and save the bird from extinction.

In 2016 the society began a pilot program with MNRE on offsetting carbon emissions by planting trees in O Le Pupu-Puʿe National Park. This was expanded in 2017 into a national carbon offsetting programme. In mid 2021 the programme planted 5,000 trees in 6 months but has planted up to 25,000 trees since beginning in 2016.

In 2019 the society conducted a series of surveys to identify and take cuttings and seeds from endangered plants, which discovered that the endangered Vavea Samoense tree may be extinct.

In 2021 the society launched a petition campaign against The Coca-Cola Company's use of plastic bottles in Samoa.

In 2023 it announced plans to reintroduce the extinct butterfly Papilio godeffroyi to Samoa.

== Aims ==
The society has the following objectives:

- To increase our knowledge and understanding of Samoa’s biodiversity and natural heritage through research and cataloguing of existing and new information;
- To improve awareness and of Samoa’s biodiversity through the exchange of information and environmental educational activities;
- To encourage the implementation of sustainable conservation projects and programmes that safeguard threatened species and ecosystems in collaboration with the Government of * Samoa, communities and other relevant stakeholders;
- To develop and strengthen collaborative partnerships between like- minded individuals, organisations, resource owners and Government agencies to achieve the objectives of the SCS;
- To raise funds and other resources that will assist with sustainable conservation projects, research and programmes for enhancing the protection of threatened species and vulnerable ecosystems.
