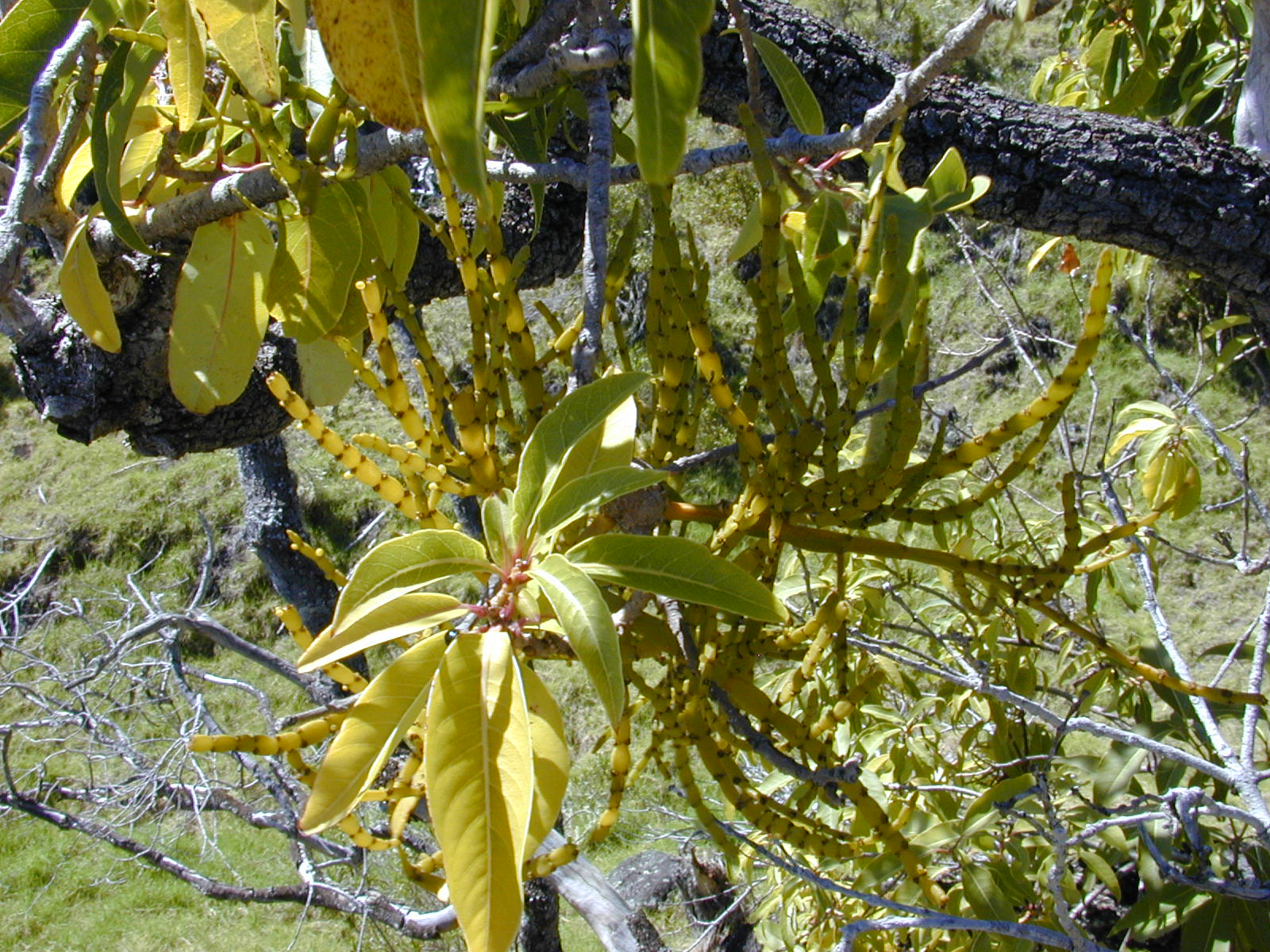
- Kaumahana (Korthalsella complanata)

Scientific classification
- Kingdom: Plantae
- Clade: Tracheophytes
- Clade: Angiosperms
- Clade: Eudicots
- Order: Santalales
- Family: Santalaceae
- Genus: Korthalsella; Tiegh.

Species
- See text

= Korthalsella =

Genus of mistletoes

Korthalsella (korthal mistletoe) is a genus of flowering plants in the sandalwood family, Santalaceae (sometimes/formerly considered to be in Viscaceae). It contains about 25 species distributed in Asia, Africa, Australia, New Zealand, and some Pacific Islands.

== Selected species ==
- Korthalsella arthroclada Cranfield (Australia)
- Korthalsella breviarticulata (Tiegh.) Danser (Australia)
- Korthalsella complanata (v. Tiegh.) Engl. - Kaumahana (Hawaiʻi)
- Korthalsella cylindrica (v. Tiegh.) Engl. - Hawaiʻi korthal mistletoe (Hawaiʻi)
- Korthalsella degeneri Danser - Degener's korthal mistletoe (Island of Oʻahu in Hawaiʻi)
- Korthalsella disticha (Endl.) Engl. (Australia)
- Korthalsella emersa Barlow (Australia)
- Korthalsella grayi Barlow (Australia)
- Korthalsella japonica (Thunb.) Engl. (Asia)
- Korthalsella latissima (v. Tiegh.) Danser - Kauaʻi korthal mistletoe (Hawaiʻi)
- Korthalsella leucothrix Barlow (Australia)
- Korthalsella papuana Danser (Australia, New Guinea)
- Korthalsella platycaula (v. Tiegh.) Engl. - Poʻowaha (Hawaiʻi)
- Korthalsella remyana v. Tiegh. - Bog korthal mistletoe (Hawaiʻi)
- Korthalsella rubra (Tiegh.) Endl. (Australia)
- Korthalsella salicornioides (A. Cunn.) Tiegh. (New Zealand)

== Image Gallery ==
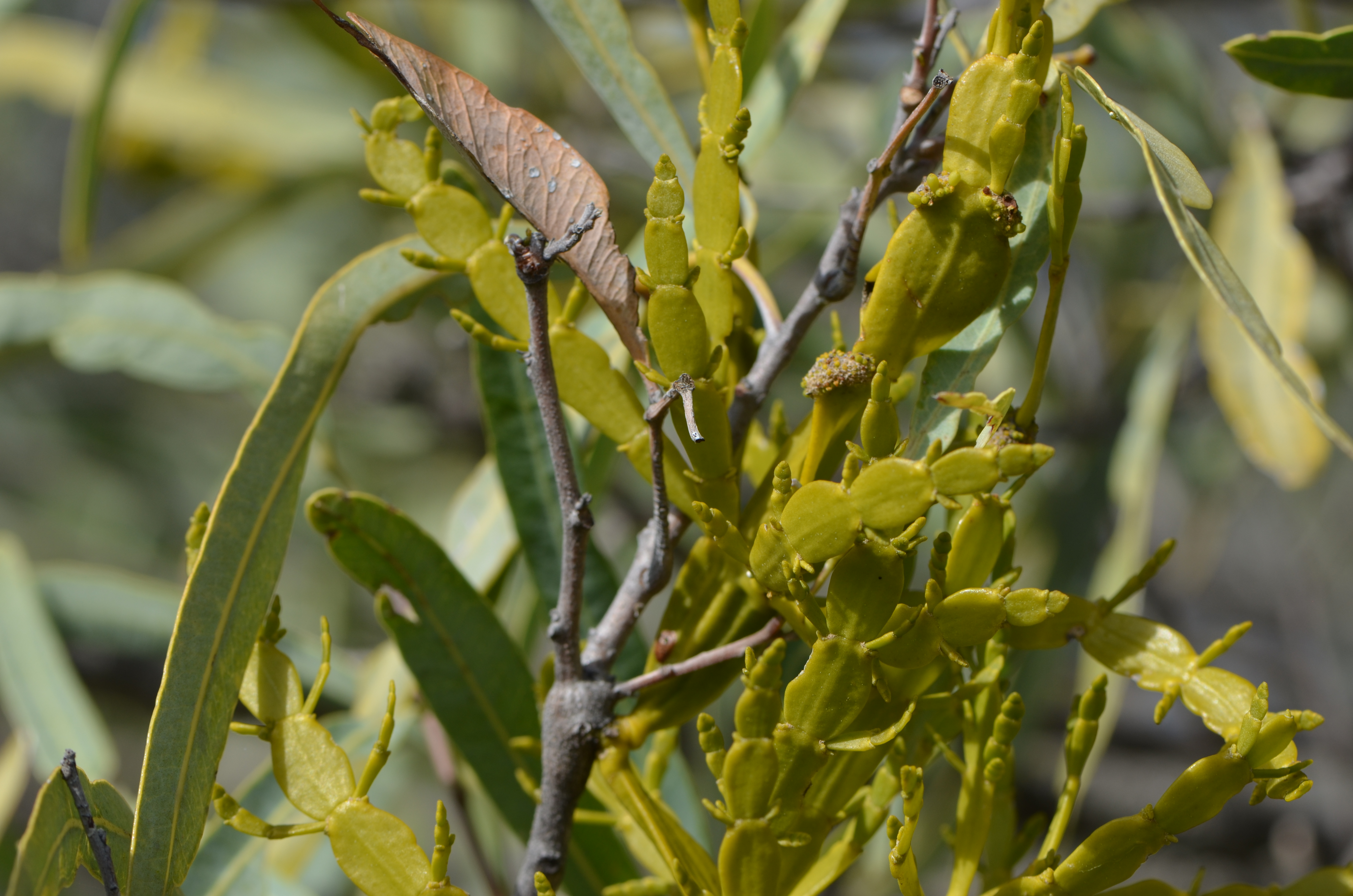
Jointed mistletoe Korthalsella rubra on Atalaya hemiglauca, just north of Breeza, NSW, Australia, 14 June 2015

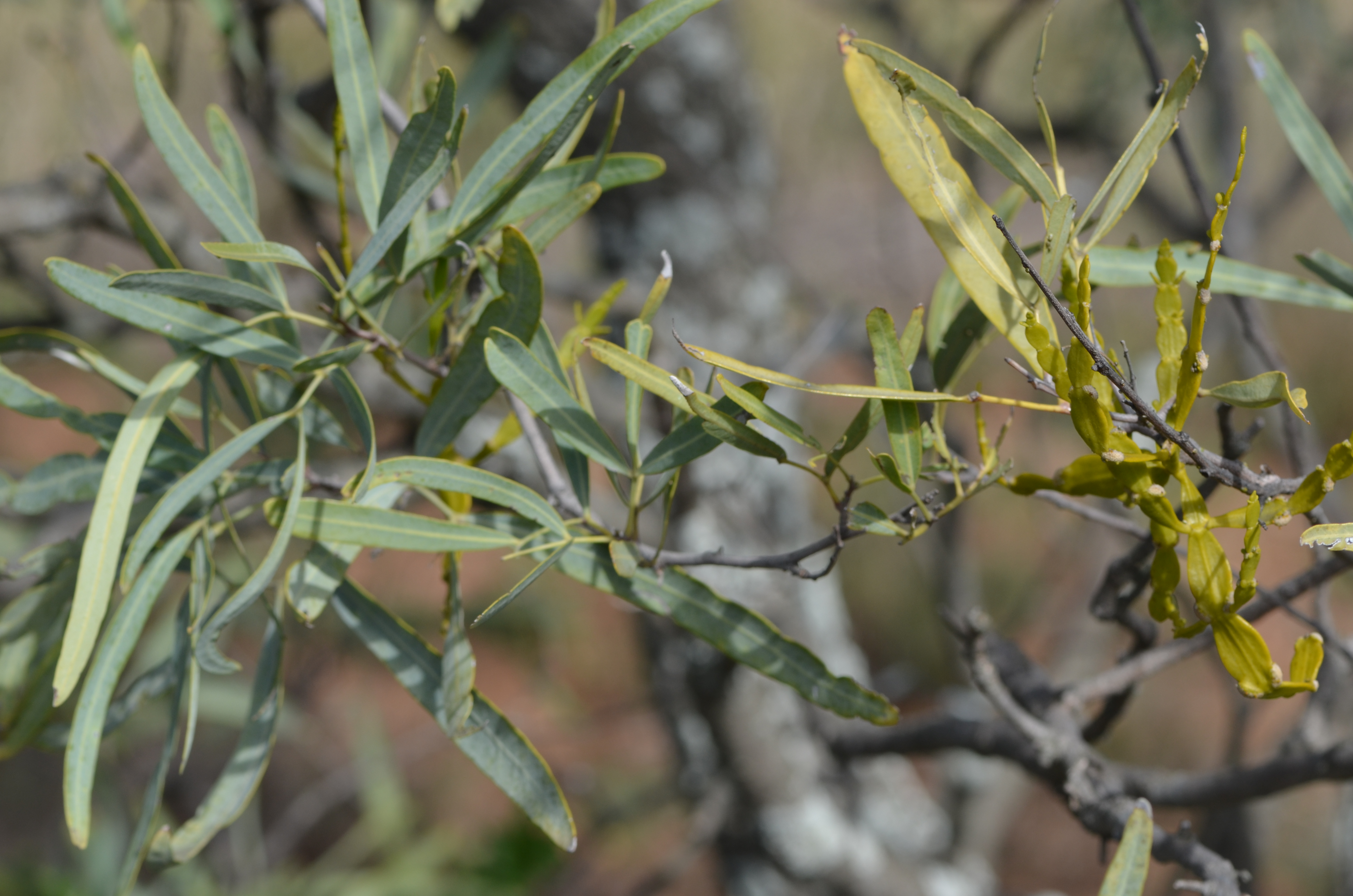
Jointed mistletoe Korthalsella rubra on Atalaya hemiglauca, just north of Breeza, NSW, Australia, 14 June 2015

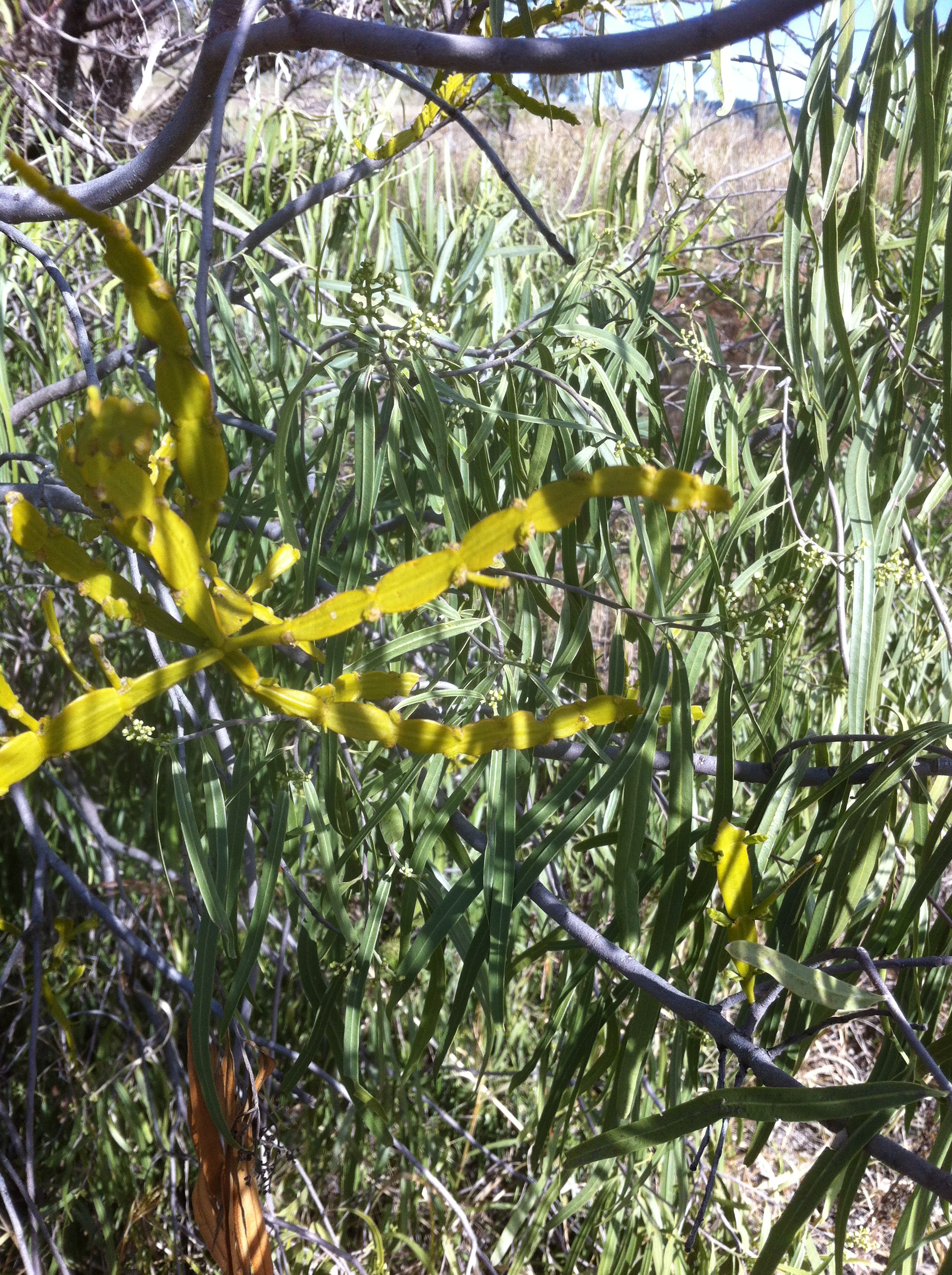
Korthalsella rubra on Wilga, Geijera parviflora, Central NSW, 14 June 2015

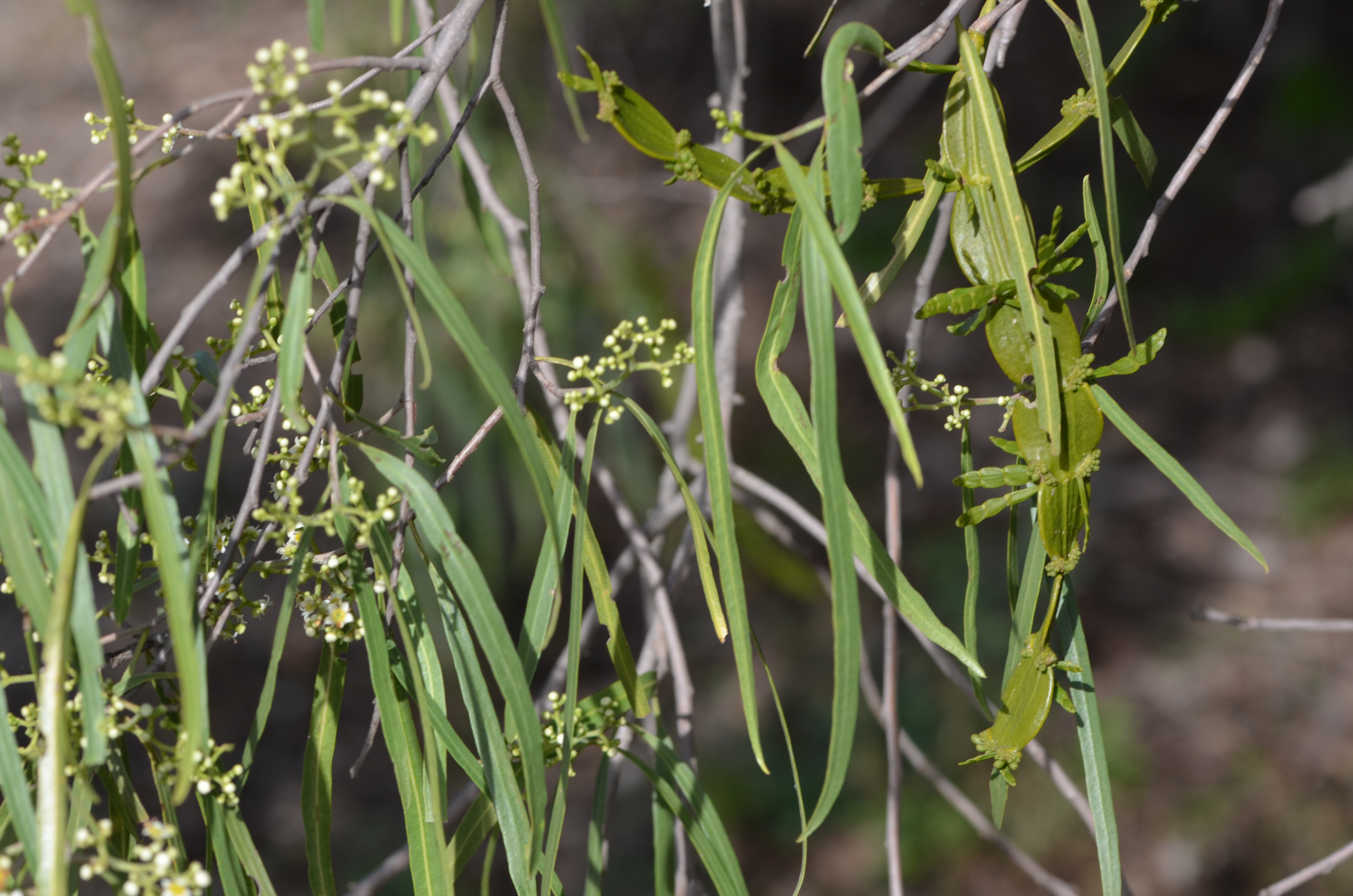
Korthalsella rubra on Wilga, Geijera parviflora, Central NSW, 14 June 2015
