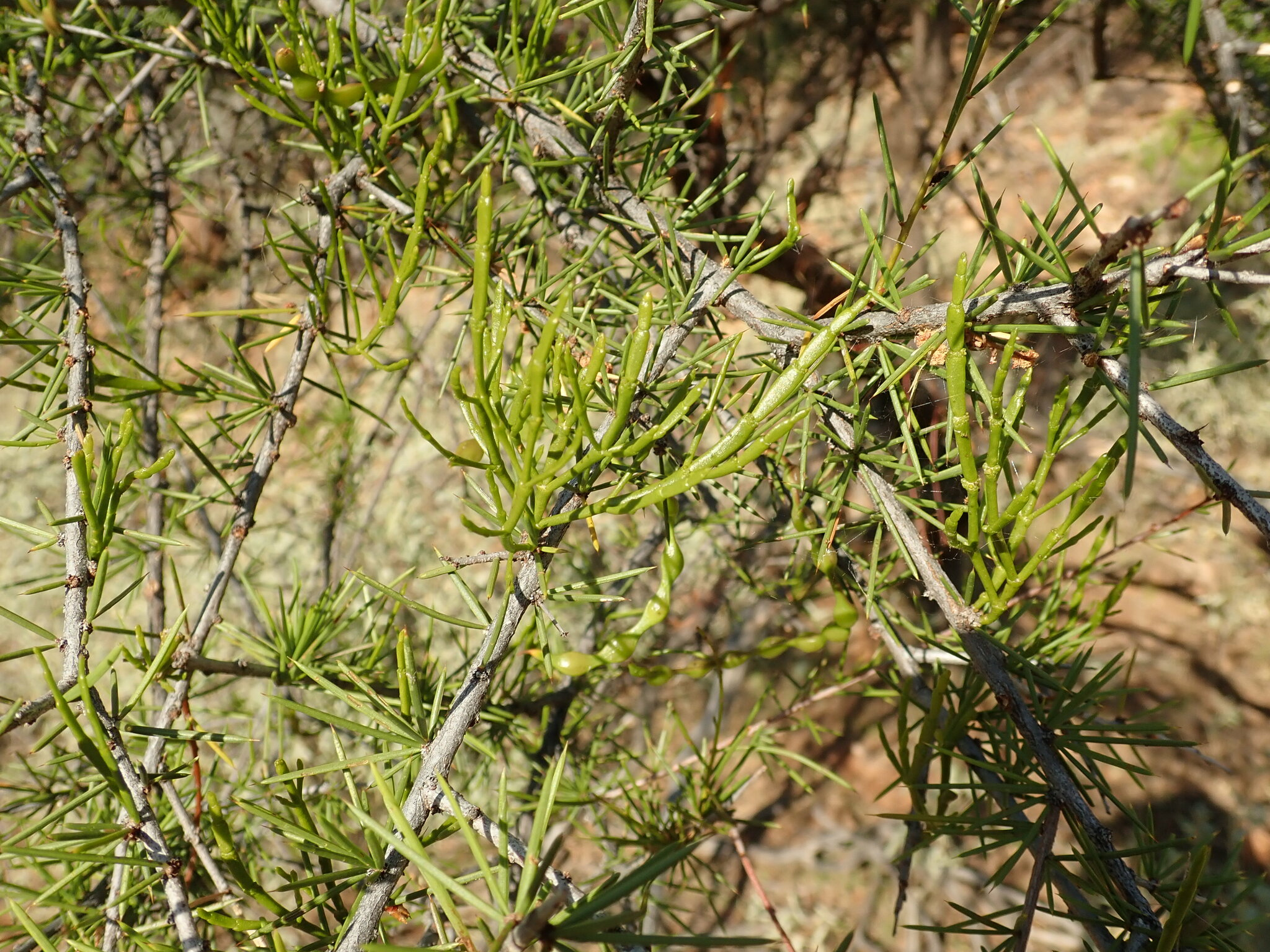
- Korthalsella leucothrix on Acacia tetragonophylla

Scientific classification
- Kingdom: Plantae
- Clade: Tracheophytes
- Clade: Angiosperms
- Clade: Eudicots
- Order: Santalales
- Family: Santalaceae
- Genus: Korthalsella
- Species: K. leucothrix

Binomial name
- Korthalsella leucothrix Barlow

= Korthalsella leucothrix =

Species of mistletoe

Korthalsella leucothrix is a jointed mistletoe in the Santalaceae family, and was first described in 1983 by Bryan Alwyn Barlow.

It is native to Western Australia, South Australia and central Queensland, where it is found in semi-arid woodland on Acacia species.
