= Korthalsella emersa =

Scientific classification
- Kingdom: Plantae
- Clade: Tracheophytes
- Clade: Angiosperms
- Clade: Eudicots
- Order: Santalales
- Family: Santalaceae
- Genus: Korthalsella
- Species: K. emersa

Binomial name
- Korthalsella emersa Barlow (1983)

Species of flowering plant

Korthalsella emersa is a flowering plant in the sandalwood family, formerly placed in the Viscaceae. The specific epithet alludes to the immersion of the flowers in the floral cushion.

== Description ==
It is a mistletoe growing to 150 mm tall. There are up to 30 flowers in a cluster, immersed in a floral cushion with black-tipped hairs. The oval fruits are about 1.5 mm long.

== Distribution and habitat ==
The species is endemic to Australia’s subtropical Lord Howe Island in the Tasman Sea. Its closest relative may be Korthalsella disticha of Norfolk Island. Recorded host species include Elaeodendron curtipendulum and Jasminum simplicifolium.
