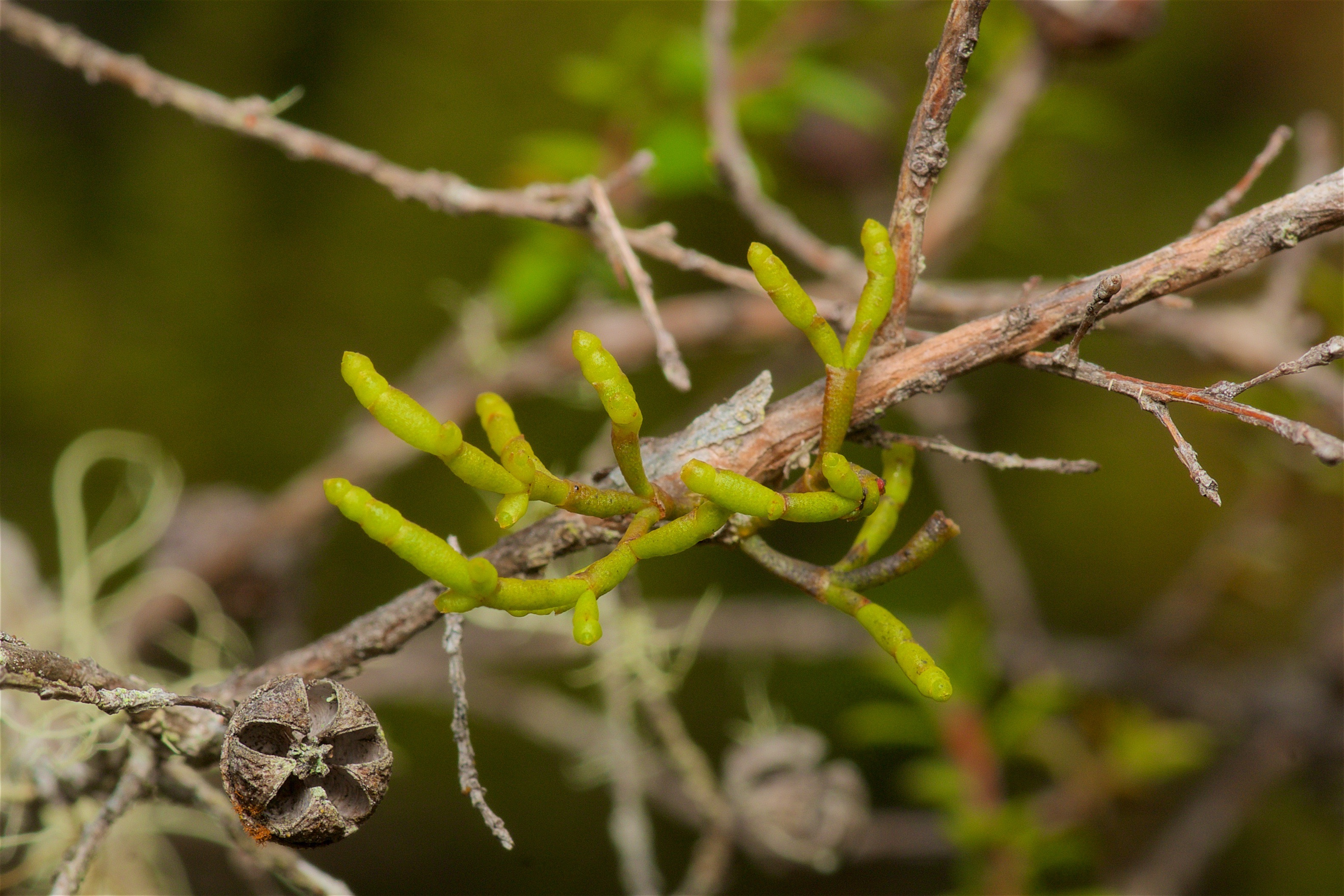
- Korthalsella salicornioides on mānuka

Conservation status
- Declining (NZ TCS)

Scientific classification
- Kingdom: Plantae
- Clade: Tracheophytes
- Clade: Angiosperms
- Clade: Eudicots
- Order: Santalales
- Family: Santalaceae
- Genus: Korthalsella
- Species: K. salicornioides

Binomial name
- Korthalsella salicornioides (A.Cunn.) Tiegh.

= Korthalsella salicornioides =

Species of flowering plant

Korthalsella salicornioides or dwarf mistletoe is an endemic parasitic plant in New Zealand.

== Description ==
Korthalsella salicornicoides is named after the succulent coastal plant Salicornia, because it has succulent stems. These appear as a dense mass of small fleshy leafless twigs, up to 10 centimetres (3.9 inches) long, usually growing on the host plants mānuka (Leptospermum scoparium) and kānuka (Kunzea ericoides). It is reddish-yellow to green with tiny flowers and small yellow fruits from October to May. It is similar to the other two species of New Zealand leafless mistletoe in the genus Korthalsella, but has denser stems arising at a narrower angle.

== Conservation ==
This species is scattered across forests and scrublands in New Zealand, only abundant in small local patches. In some areas it is threatened by felling of Leptospermum and Kunzea for firewood, farming, or exotic forestry. As at 2023, this species is classed as At Risk - Declining by the Department of Conservation. This species is also regarded as "declining" in the Wellington Region as at December 2025.
