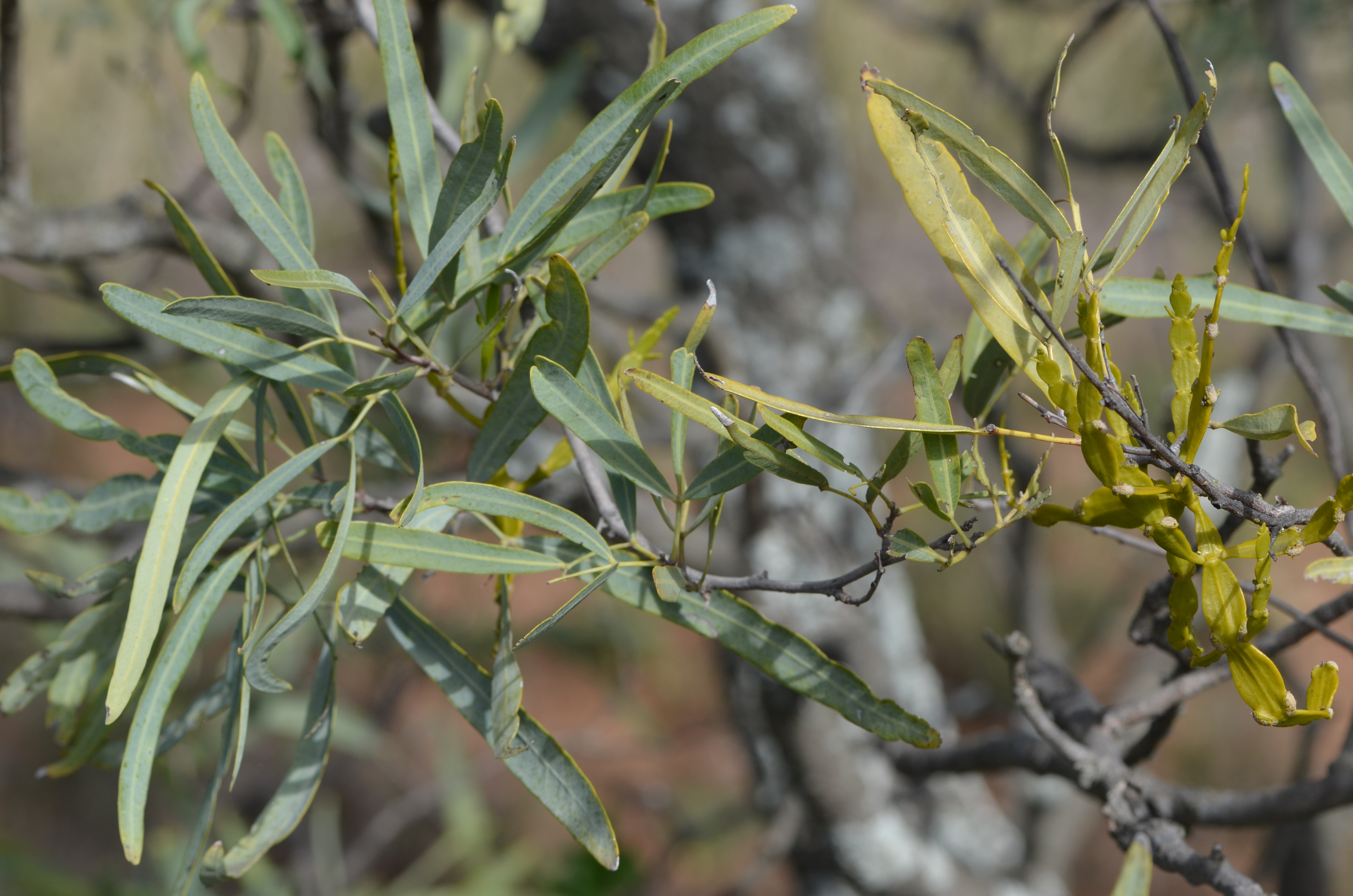

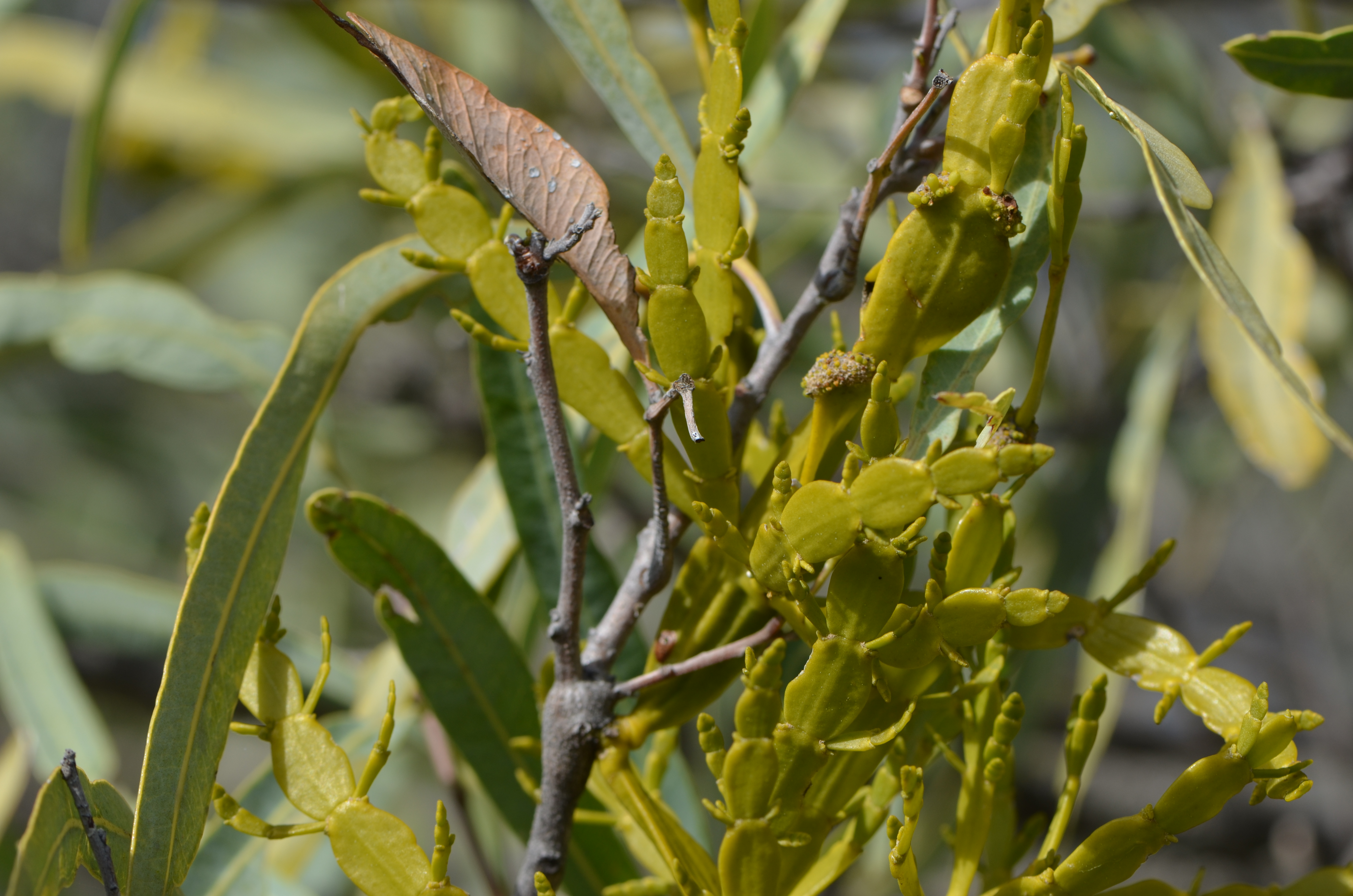
- Korthalsella rubra on Atalaya hemiglauca

Scientific classification
- Kingdom: Plantae
- Clade: Tracheophytes
- Clade: Angiosperms
- Clade: Eudicots
- Order: Santalales
- Family: Santalaceae
- Genus: Korthalsella
- Species: K. rubra

Binomial name
- Korthalsella rubra (Tiegh.) Engl.

= Korthalsella rubra =

Species of flowering plant

Korthalsella rubra (common name - Jointed mistletoe) is a flowering plant in the Santalaceae (sandalwood) family, formerly placed in the Viscaceae.

== Description ==
It grows to about 16 cm, and has distinctive green to yellow-green segmented branches which are flattened. The minute flowers are found within cushions at the nodes between the segments, separating into the edges as the segments grow larger.

== Distribution ==
It is found in eastern Australia from Gippsland (Victoria) to Cape York (Queensland).

== Ecology ==
It is a host plant for the butterfly, Delias nysa, and can be found on some 25 or more different host species.

== Taxonomy ==
It was first described as Bifaria rubra by Philippe Édouard Léon Van Tieghem in 1896. In 1897, Adolf Engler assigned it to the genus, Korthalsella, renaming it, Korthalsella rubra. This taxonomy is accepted by the CHAH, but others consider it a synonym of Korthalsella japonica f. rubra (Tiegh.) Molvray.

Australian taxonomic sources accept two subspecies, Korthalsella rubra (Tiegh.) Engl. subsp. rubra, and Korthalsella rubra subsp. geijericola Barlow.
