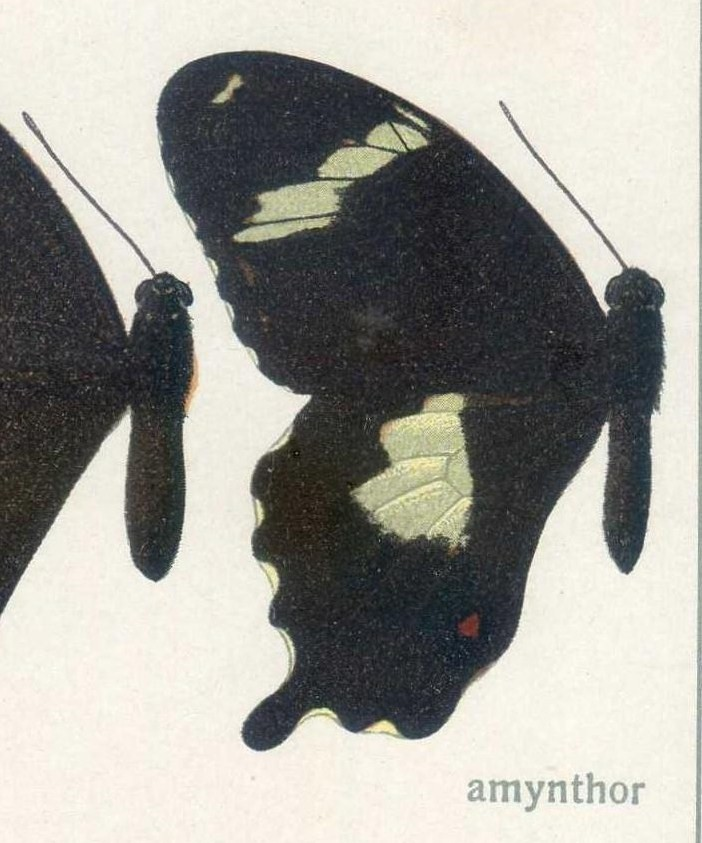

Scientific classification
- Kingdom: Animalia
- Phylum: Arthropoda
- Clade: Pancrustacea
- Class: Insecta
- Order: Lepidoptera
- Family: Papilionidae
- Genus: Papilio
- Species: P. amynthor

Binomial name
- Papilio amynthor Boisduval, 1859

Synonyms
- Papilio ilioneus Donovan, 1805; Papilio amphiaraus C. & R. Felder, 1864; Papilio abstrusus Butler, [1876]

= Papilio amynthor =

Norfolk swallowtail
- as Papilio ilioneus Donovan, 1805

Species of insect

Papilio amynthor, the Norfolk swallowtail, is a species of butterfly in the family Papilionidae, that is found in the south-west Pacific Ocean on Norfolk Island and the Loyalty Islands. It commonly inhabits rainforest and suburban areas.

== Description ==
P. ilioneus. Palpi laterally entirely white; abdomen beneath at the sides and in the middle with altogether 5 yellowish white, rather thick lines. Male: forewing above distally to the cell with an oblique band of white spots and before the distal margin a row of white submarginal dots, of which usually the 1. (placed before the 4. subcostal) is distinct; hindwing with white discal area from the costal margin to the 1. median or somewhat beyond it, the 3. patch always the largest, the last small, placed close to the cell, the apex of the cell always white; the fringe-spots white, large. Under surface: forewing as above, but the oblique band broader and all the submarginal spots except the last well developed, before the submedian a short white discal linear transverse spot; the discal band of the hindwing continued to the anal margin, a complete row of submarginal spots, the first and last large, rounded and yellow-red with yellowish white margin, the others yellowish white with red dots. The female paler brown, the markings of the forewing yellowish, larger than in the male before the hindmargin at 2/3 a triangular patch. On New Caledonia and the neighbouring Loyalty Islands, as well as on Norfolk Island. — ilioneus Don. (= amphiaraus Fldr.). the subapical band of the forewing above broad, yellowish; the submarginal spots of the hindwing beneath large, the 2. and 3. at least as large as the black spots which are placed between them and the yellowish white discal area. Norfolk Island. — amynthor Bdv. (= abstrusus Btlr.) (27 c). The subapical band of the fore wing and the posterior patches of the yellowish white area of the hindwing less narrow than in the preced ing form, the band of the forewing narrower and the submarginal spots on the under surface of both wings smaller. New Caledonia and the Loyalty Islands; apparently common.Karl Jordan in Seitz.

== Subspecies ==
The wingspan is 85–91 mm.

The larvae feed on the leaves of Zanthoxylum pinnatum, and the introduced Citrus limon.

== Taxonomy ==
Papilio amynthor is a member of the godeffroyi species group. The clade members are:

- Papilio amynthor Boisduval, 1859 – Norfolk swallowtail
- Papilio godeffroyi Semper, 1866 – Godeffroy's swallowtail
- Papilio schmeltzi Herrich-Schäffer, 1869
