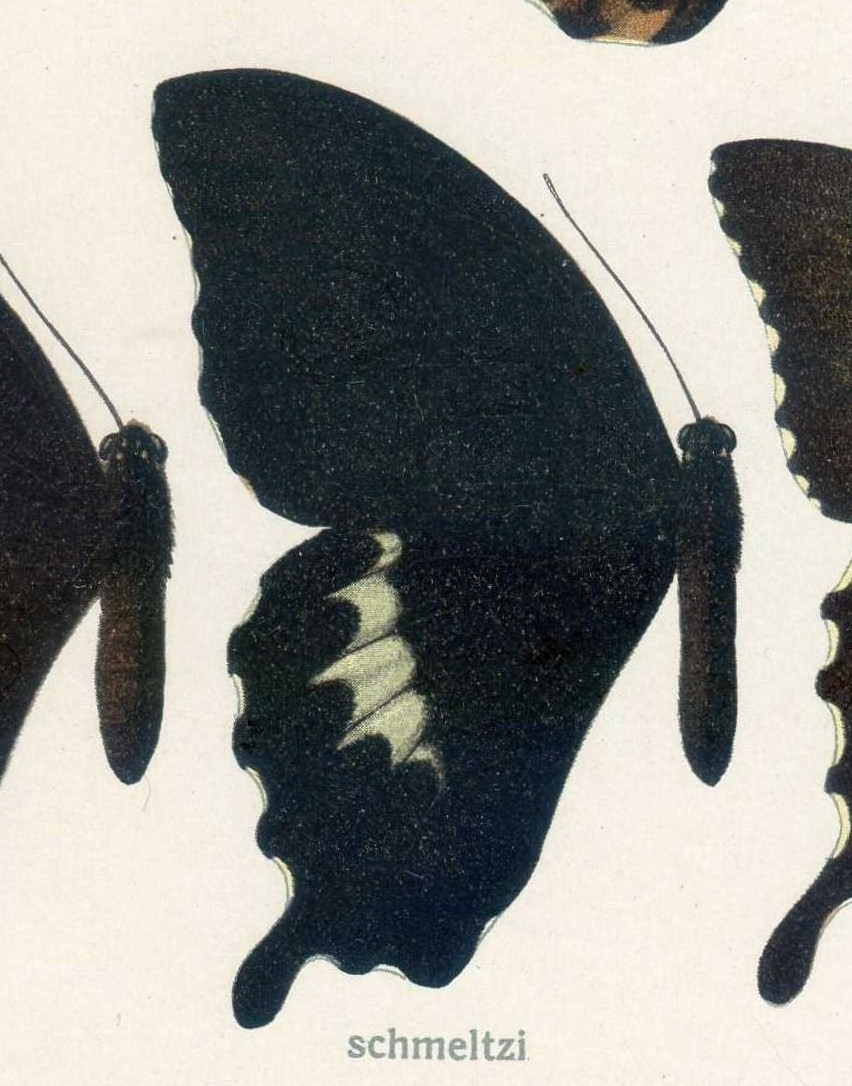

Conservation status
- Near Threatened (IUCN 3.1)

Scientific classification
- Kingdom: Animalia
- Phylum: Arthropoda
- Clade: Pancrustacea
- Class: Insecta
- Order: Lepidoptera
- Family: Papilionidae
- Genus: Papilio
- Species: P. schmeltzi

Binomial name
- Papilio schmeltzi Herrich-Schäffer, 1869

= Papilio schmeltzi =

Species of butterfly

Papilio schmeltzi is a species of swallowtail butterfly from the genus Papilio that is endemic to Fiji. It was named to honour the German naturalist Johann Schmeltz. It is listed by the IUCN as near threatened.

== Description ==
P. schmeltzi Herr.-Sch. (27 c). Male forewing black, commonly anteriorly with traces of a thin, curved white discal band, which is always present beneath. Hindwing with bluish grey discal band, which does not reach the abdominal margin and is very strongly dentate distally; beneath this band is represented by a fairly complete row of thin lunules, distally to which large blue lunules are placed, the submarginal spots, which are wanting above, are beneath ochre-yellow and all very well developed, the veins striped with grey at the base of the hindwing, especially the costal (as in godeffroyi). Female paler than forewing also above always with discal band. The freshly laid egg straw-yellow, later orange, before hatching grey. The young larva similar to bird-droppings, with branched spines on all the segments; when full-grown very variable, usually green, with brown thoracic band, which beneath runs laterally to the prothorax, on the abdomen 2 shortened oblique bands, on the 3 thoracic segments and the penultimate abdominal segment low tubercles; the scent-fork vivid red. Pupa always fastened to a twig, blue-green, beneath in the middle strongly convex, dorsally moderately incurved, with silver stripes on the wing-cases and the abdomen, the middle of the abdomen dorsally vivid golden green; on Aralia. The butterfly in the open forest where there is underwood; its flight irregular, jerky. — Fiji Islands; the only Papilio occurring there.

== Taxonomy ==
Papilio schmeltzi is a member of the godeffroyi species group. The clade members are:

- Papilio amynthor Boisduval, 1859 – Norfolk swallowtail
- Papilio godeffroyi Semper, 1866 – Godeffroy's swallowtail
- Papilio schmeltzi Herrich-Schäffer, 1869
