= O Le Pupu-Puʿe National Park =

National park in Samoa

- IUCN category II (national park)
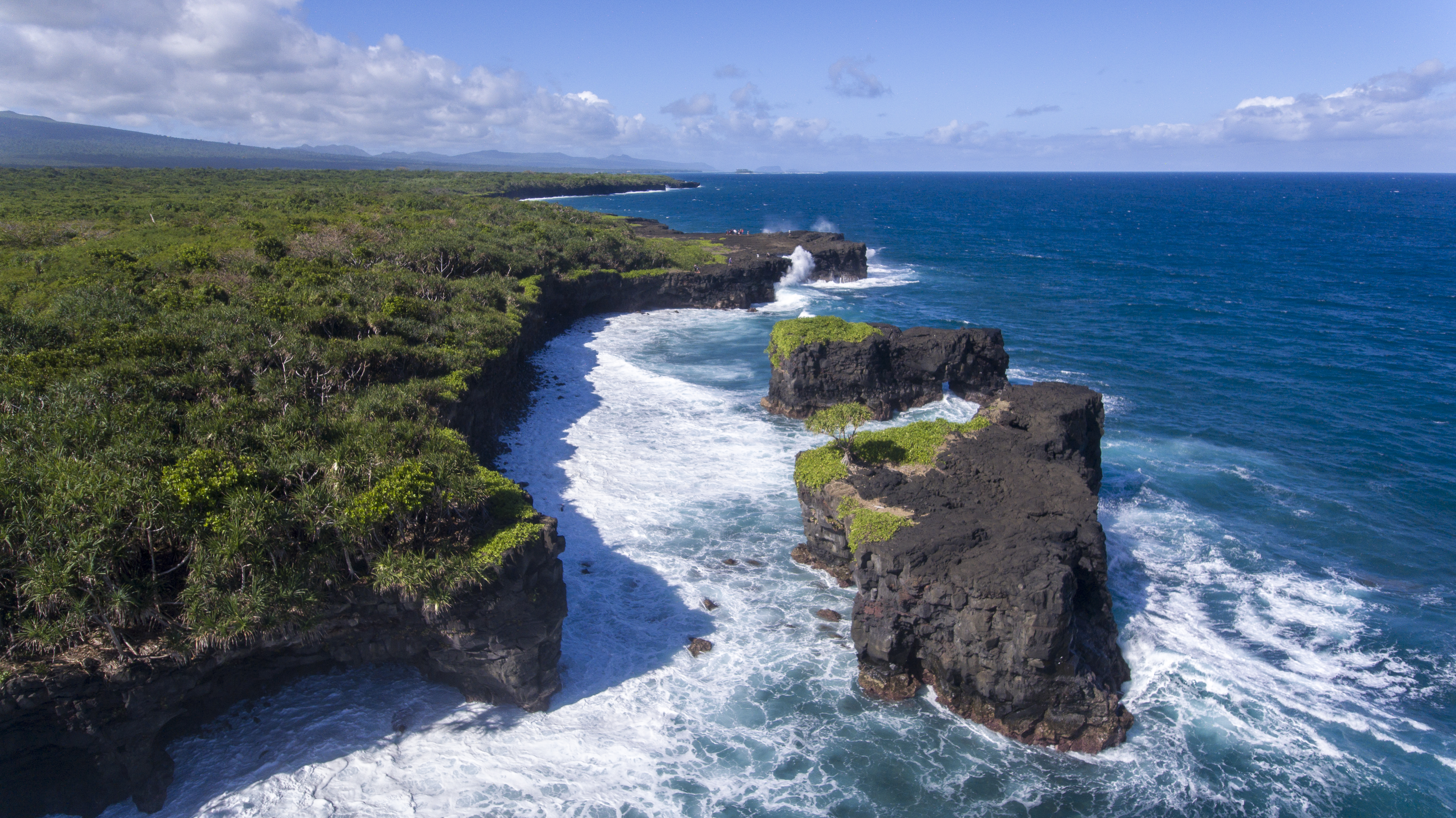
- Aerial view of the O Le Pupū lava cliffs, Samoa

- Location within Samoa Location within Pacific Ocean
- Interactive map of O Le Pupu-Puʿe National Park
- Location: Upolu, Samoa
- Nearest city: Apia
- Coordinates: 13°59′S 171°43′W
- Area: 50.2 km^{2} (19.4 sq mi)
- Established: 1978
- Governing body: Ministry of Natural Resources and Environment

O Le Pupu-Puʿe National Park ("The Cliffs-Mountain") is the oldest national park in Samoa. Established in 1978, the park covers 5019 hectares of the southern-central portion of the island of Upolu on the border of the Atua and Tuamasaga districts. The park extends from Mount Fito, the highest mountain on Uplou, to the coast, and includes uplands, valleys, marshes, the O Le Pupu lava field, and coastal cliffs. In 2016 it was designated as a wetland of international importance under the Ramsar Convention.

== History ==
The park was established in 1978 under the authority of the National Parks and Reserves Act 1974. Originally covering 2800 hectares, the park was later expanded to 4234 hectares. In 2008 an adjoining forestry project was incorporated, as well as the Togitogiga Recreational Reserve, expanding the park to 5019 hectares.

The park was initially managed by the Forestry Division of the Ministry of Agriculture, Forestry, Fisheries and Meteorology. In 1989 control was passed to the Lands, Surveys and Environment Department. In 2005, it was transferred again, to the Ministry of Natural Resources and Environment.

== Ecology ==
The park extends from Mount Fito and Mount Le Pu’e on Upolu's central ridge to the coast, taking in the entire range of forest types found on Upolu. It includes areas of montane and lowland forest as well as littoral vegetation. 352 native plant species have been recorded in the park, representing half of Samoa's native plant-life. 51 animal species have been recorded, including the Samoa flying fox, Insular flying fox, and Pacific sheath-tailed bat. The Pacific boa is also believed to be present, and remains were found in the park in 2018.

In the wake of cyclones Ofa and Val 10% of the park area has been taken over by the invasive Merremia plant.
