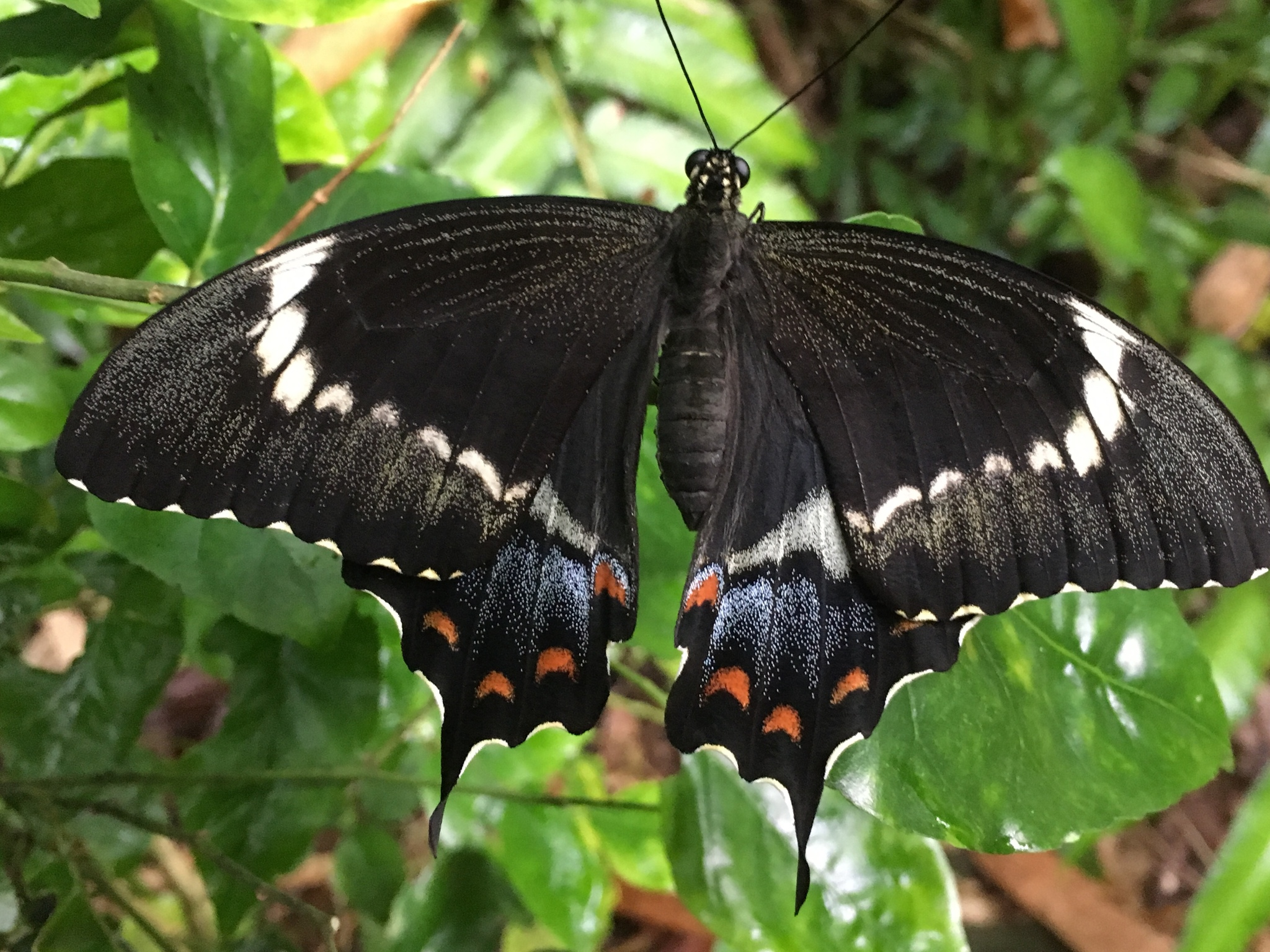

Scientific classification
- Kingdom: Animalia
- Phylum: Arthropoda
- Clade: Pancrustacea
- Class: Insecta
- Order: Lepidoptera
- Family: Papilionidae
- Genus: Papilio
- Species: P. godeffroyi

Binomial name
- Papilio godeffroyi Semper, 1866

= Papilio godeffroyi =

Godeffroy's swallowtail

Species of butterfly

Papilio godeffroyi, the Godeffroy's swallowtail, (Samoan pepe ae) is a butterfly of the family Papilionidae.

Papilio godeffroyi was endemic to all of Samoa, but it is now found only on the island of Tutuila, where it is uncommon but widespread and restricted to undisturbed or near-undisturbed rainforest. It was last seen in Samoa in 1979. This is only around 5% of its original range, and the species has recently been submitted to the IUCN Red List as critically endangered.

== Description ==
godeffroyi Semp. (27 c). Male forewing rather pointed, with oblique band of white spots distally to the cell, the band beneath continued to the submedian by an interrupted or complete row of narrow transverse spots. Hindwing above with bluish grey discal band, which is pointed posteriorly and does not enter the cell; distally to the band indistinctly defined blue spots; fringe-spots of both wings large. Beneath the band of the forewing only indicated by a faint line, distally to this a complete row of blue lunules, the submarginal spots yellowish grey, not sharply defined, the anal spot yellow-red. The female paler, the forewing with a macular band, continued also above to the hindmargin; hindwing above with several red submarginal spots, beneath, the discal band very narrow, white, the submarginal spots all distinct, yellow-red. The young larva black, with white V on the back, and black spines. The full-grown larva variable, usually green and marked similarly to the larva of schmeltzi, on the 3. to 5. segments 2 short orange-coloured spines at each side, on the 8. to 12. segments an orange-coloured tubercle at each side; on Aralia. Pupa golden green, the back of the abdomen uniformly convex; always fastened on the midrib of a leaf. The larvae of this species and schmeltzi feed by day. — Samoa.

== Biology ==
The larva feeds on Micromelum minutum (Rutaceae), locally called talafalu.

== Taxonomy ==
Papilio godeffroyi is a member of the godeffroyi species group. The clade members are:

- Papilio amynthor Boisduval, 1859 – Norfolk swallowtail
- Papilio godeffroyi Semper, 1866 – Godeffroy's swallowtail
- Papilio schmeltzi Herrich-Schäffer, 1869

== Etymology ==
The species, named to honour Johann Cesar VI. Godeffroy, is illustrated on a Samoan postage stamp issued on 14 December 2001.

== Conservation ==
In July 2023 the Samoa Conservation Society announced plans to reintroduce the butterfly to Samoa.

== See also ==
- Samoan tropical moist forests
