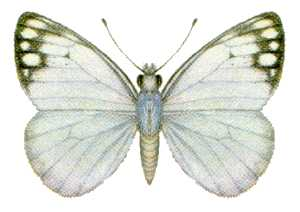
- upperside
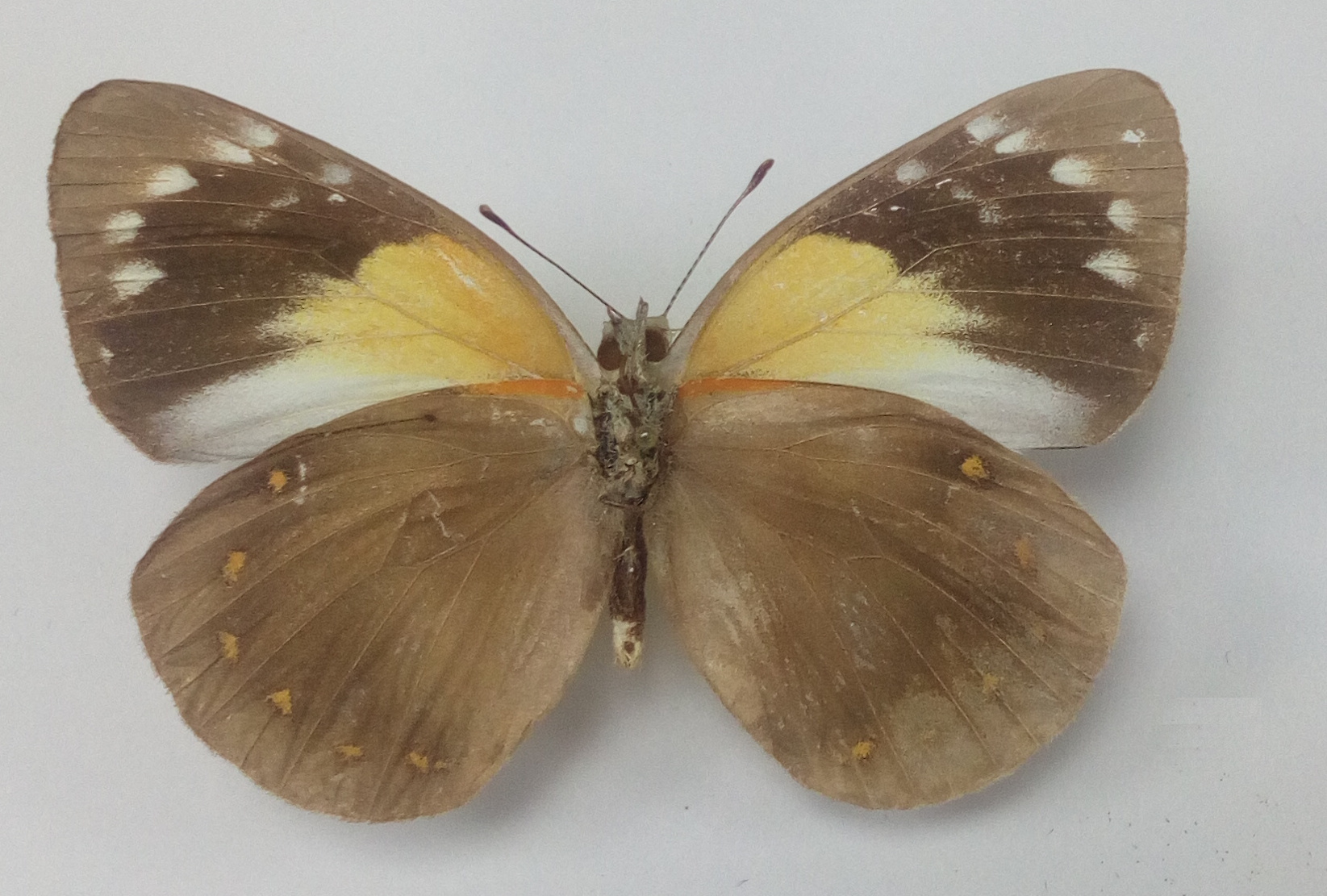
- underside

Scientific classification
- Kingdom: Animalia
- Phylum: Arthropoda
- Class: Insecta
- Order: Lepidoptera
- Family: Pieridae
- Genus: Delias
- Species: D. nysa

Binomial name
- Delias nysa (Fabricius, 1775)

Synonyms
- Papilio nysa Fabricius, 1775; Papilio endora Donovan, 1805; Delias nivira Waterhouse & Lyell, 1914

= Delias nysa =

Yellow-spotted Jezebel

Species of butterfly

Delias nysa, common name yellow-spotted jezebel (Australian subspecies), is a butterfly in the family Pieridae, described in 1775. It is found in Australia (New South Wales, Queensland and Victoria), New Caledonia and Vanuatu. The wingspan is 50 mm. beneath it is grey-black all over, with yellowish basal half to the forewing and 6 orange-coloured, isolated small submarginal spots on the hindwing.

The larvae feed on mistletoe species, including Amyema gaudichaudii, Korthalsella japonica, Korthalsella breviarticulata and Korthalsella rubra.

== Subspecies ==
- Delias nysa nysa (Cairns to Wollongong)
- Delias nysa nivira Waterhouse & Lyell, 1914 (northern Queensland)
- Delias nysa caledonica Nieuwenhuis & Howarth, 1969 (New Caledonia)

== Taxonomy ==
It is the nominotypical member of the nysa group
