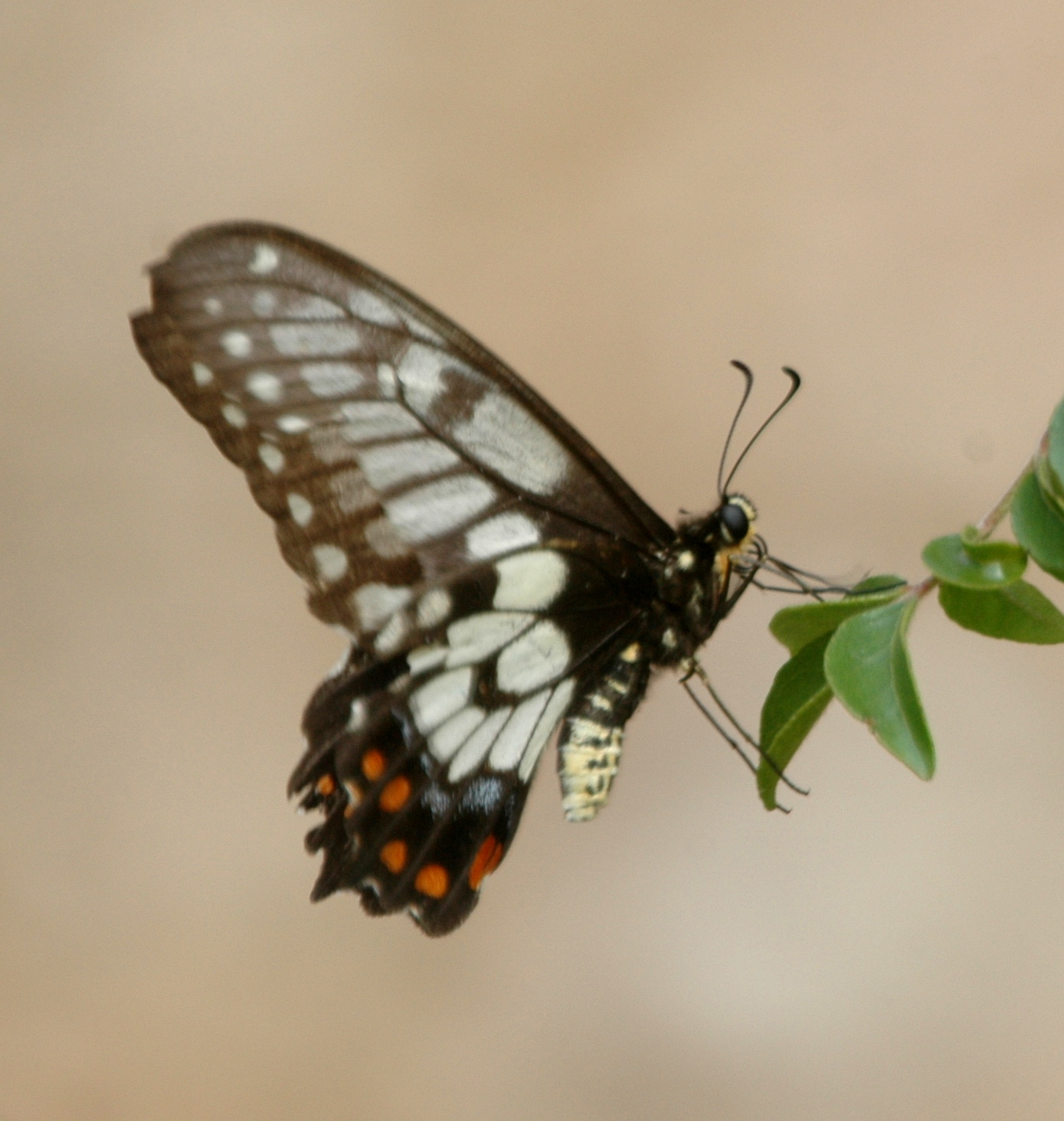

Scientific classification
- Kingdom: Animalia
- Phylum: Arthropoda
- Clade: Pancrustacea
- Class: Insecta
- Order: Lepidoptera
- Family: Papilionidae
- Genus: Papilio
- Species: P. anactus

Binomial name
- Papilio anactus Macleay, 1826
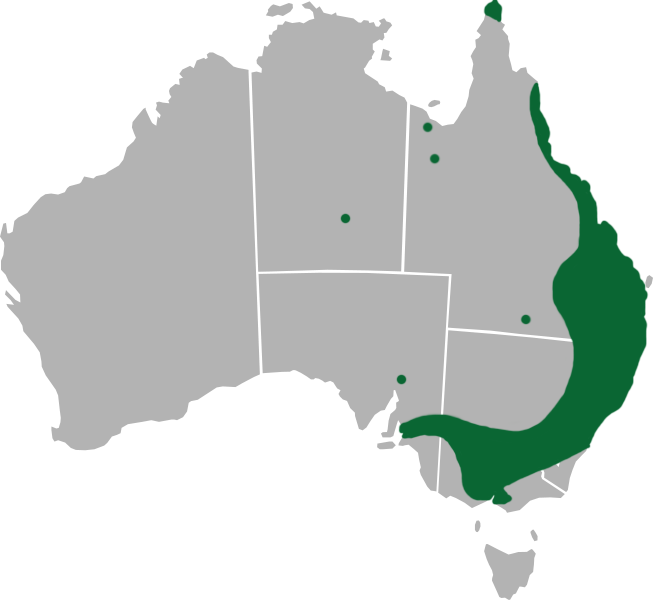
- Range of Papilio anactus

Synonyms
- Eleppone anactus

= Papilio anactus =

Species of butterfly

Papilio anactus, the dainty swallowtail, dingy swallowtail or small citrus butterfly is a medium-sized butterfly from the family Papilionidae, that is endemic to Australia.

For protection against predators, this non-poisonous butterfly mimics the poisonous male Cressida cressida, another swallowtail butterfly that obtains its toxic properties through its host plant, the Dutchman's pipe.

== Distribution ==
Papilio anactus is endemic to Australia. It was originally only present in New South Wales, Victoria and Queensland, but due to the growing of citrus, a larval food plant of this species, in orchards, the species spread to South Australia in the late 1920s. Papilio anactus is not present on Kangaroo Island or elsewhere in Australia, as there are currently too few citrus trees. Sadly this butterfly is much less common than it once used to be.

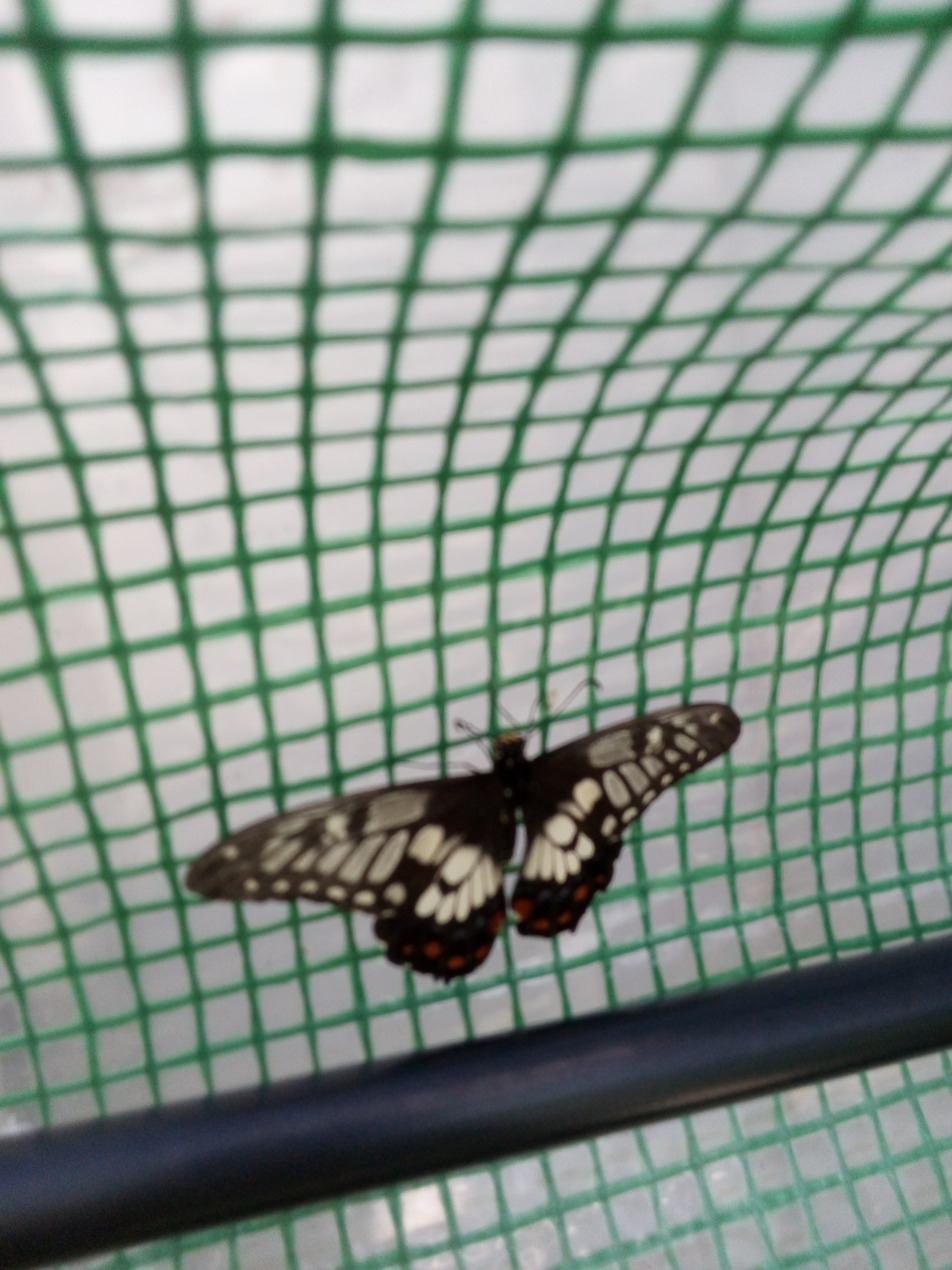
Dingy Swallowtail

It also occurs on New Caledonia. There, it may be an introduced species or a vagrant.

== Life cycle ==
=== Egg ===
The eggs are relatively large, pale yellow, and roughly spherical. The eggs change to an orange colour when the larvae are almost ready to emerge.

Females only lay eggs on the newly grown leaves of the host plant. They are laid at the edge of larger leaves, either above and beneath. The larvae develop inside the egg immediately after being laid. Eggs normally hatch after approximately 3 or 4 days, but the duration may vary depending on the time at which they are laid. The eggs are prone to small predators that eat the contents of the egg, and are also commonly parasitised by small wasps. Unfertilised eggs are sometimes laid.

=== Larva ===
The first instar is dark, with two rows of short, bristly spines. The anterior parts have broad yellowish bands and a black head, with some short hairs; the first three instars retain this. Later instars have a white upside-down V mark on the front which becomes most visible in the last instar. The fleshy spines also become less bristly in later instars, and towards the last instar, are almost absent. After emergence the immature larva eats the egg shell before moving on to eat new leaf shoots. Later instars eat fully developed new leaves, but not usually matured leaves. In warm areas the larvae go through five instars, and larvae in cold areas can have six instars before developing to a pupa.

Mature larvae are about 35 mm long, generally black, with two subdorsal rows of fleshy black spines, and sublateral and lateral rows of large orange or yellow blotches, and numerous small, light blue and white spots. The strength of yellow can vary, and some larvae can be a strong yellow or pale. The amount of orange can also vary, and it can be absent. There are subdorsal blue dots on the anterior part of the larva. The head is large, black, with a white upside-down v mark on the front.

When disturbed, the larvae can erect a reddish-orange coloured, osmeterium from behind the head which releases a citrus-like smell of rotting oranges. This smell acts as a repellent to predators. The larvae attempt to throw their heads either backwards or sideways if a predator attacks because it is more effective if the chemical hits the predator. The secretion is usually composed of an irritant butyric acid. The osmeterium exists in all stages of the larvae.

=== Pupa ===
The pupa is straight and approximately 30 mm long. The thorax becomes notably out-stretching forward. It is usually attached to the stems of the host plant and almost always on the other side of the tree from where the larva was last feeding. The larva will sometimes leave the host plant to pupate. The pupa is attached to the stem by a central silken girdle. It either moves back vertically or is held horizontally. The colour is dimorphic, being either green or grey brown with other variable markings. The colour pattern mimics the stem that the pupa is attached so that it looks like a snapped extension of the stem. If the stem is green or is surrounded by leaves, then the colour of the pupa is mostly green. The time-span of the pupa can vary. It can be two weeks in summer, or up to four weeks in autumn. Often those pupae formed in autumn will not become adults until the following spring, or even longer with diapause records of 1 to 2 years.

Almost exclusively hosts on native and introduced Citrus, also Geijera parviflora.

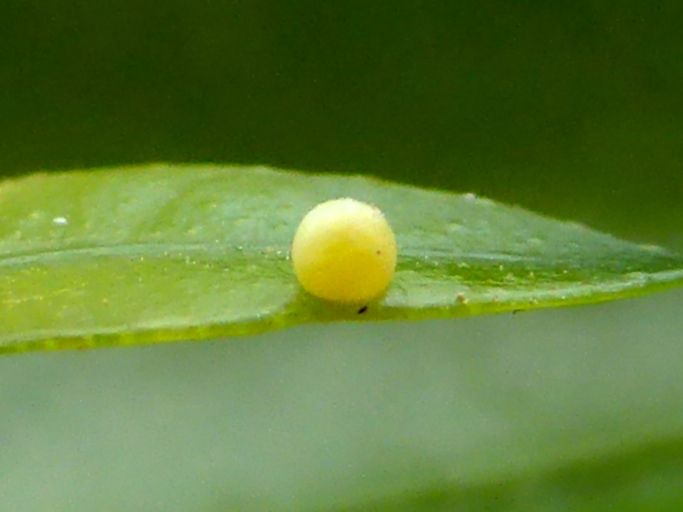
Egg on immature Citrus leaf

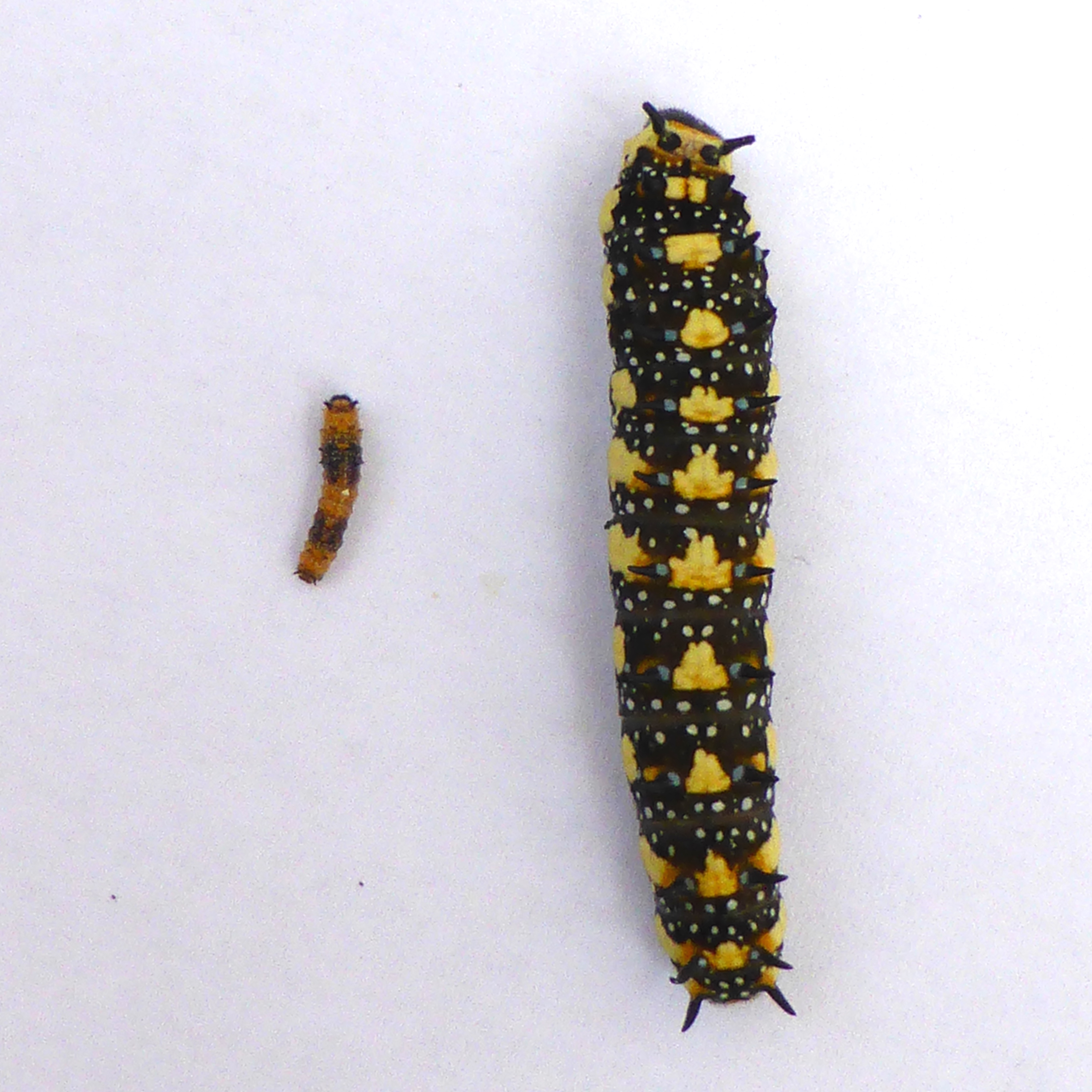
First (left) and last (right) instars

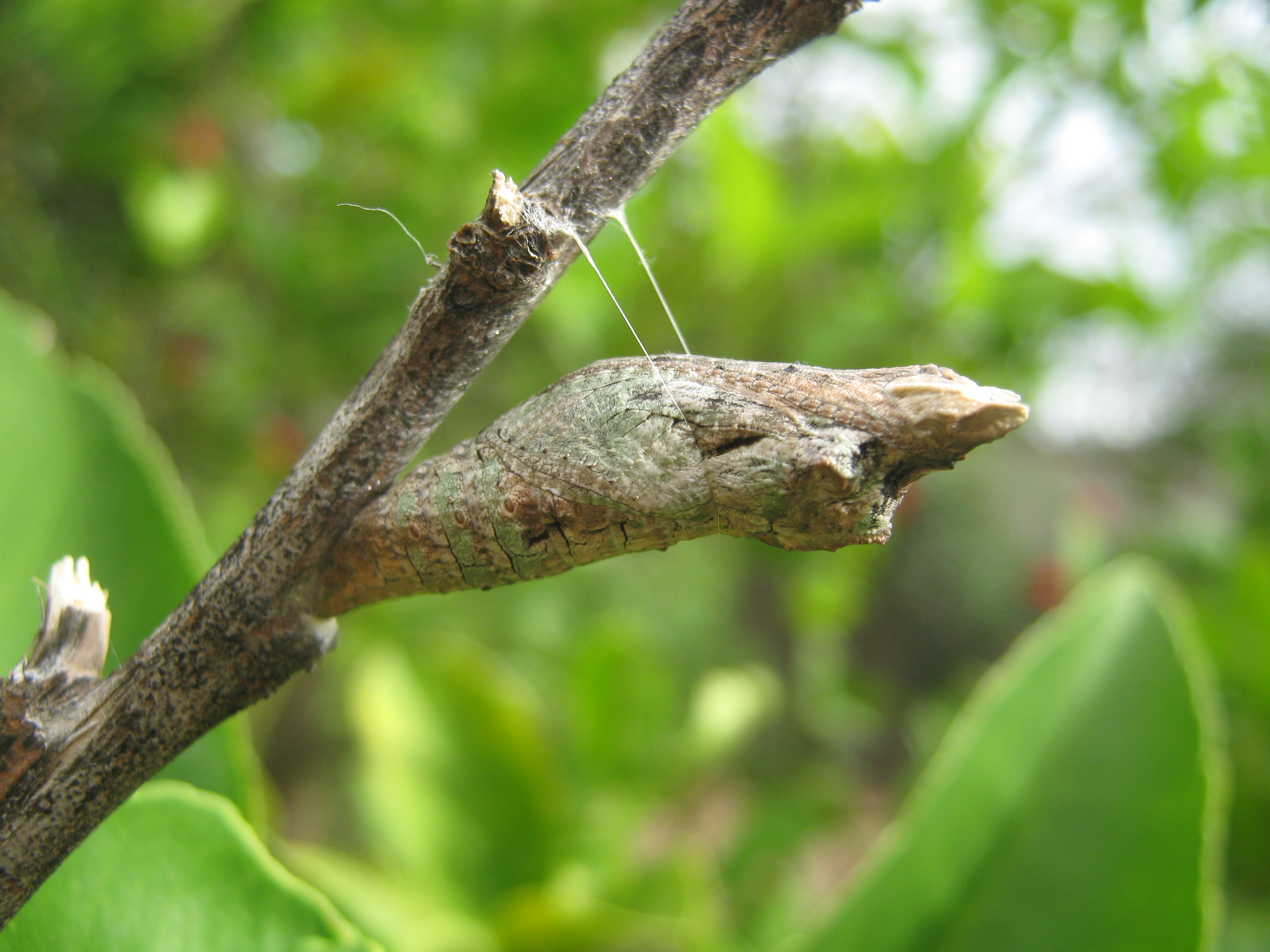
Brown chrysalis attached to a lemon tree
