= List of critically endangered plants =

- Extinct in the wild (EW): 46 species
- Critically endangered (CR): 6,445 species
- Endangered (EN): 12,707 species
- Vulnerable (VU): 10,596 species
- Near threatened (NT, LR/cd): 4,880 species
- Least concern (LC): 35,732 species
- Data deficient (DD): 6,317 species
Plant species (IUCN, 2025.2)
- 76,864 extant species have been evaluated
- 70,547 of those are fully assessed (Note: excludes data deficient evaluations.)
- 40,612 are not threatened at present
- 29,935 are threatened (Note: Threatened comprises CR, EN and VU.)
- 187 to 892 are extinct or extinct in the wild:
  - 141 extinct (EX) species (Note: Chart omits extinct (EX) species)
  - 46 extinct in the wild (EW)
  - 648 possibly extinct [CR(PE)]
  - 57 possibly extinct in the wild [CR(PEW)]

Critically Endangered (CR) species face an extremely high risk of extinction in the wild.

As of December 2023, the International Union for Conservation of Nature (IUCN) lists 5702 plant species categorized as Critically Endangered, including 569 which are tagged as possibly extinct and 48 possibly extinct in the wild. 8.6% of all evaluated plant species are listed as critically endangered. The IUCN also lists 284 subspecies and varieties as critically endangered.

Additionally 5371 plant species (8.1% of those evaluated) are listed as data deficient, meaning there is insufficient information for a full assessment of conservation status. As these species typically have small distributions and/or populations, they are intrinsically likely to be threatened, according to the IUCN. While the category of data deficient indicates that no assessment of extinction risk has been made for the taxa, the IUCN notes that it may be appropriate to give them "the same degree of attention as threatened taxa, at least until their status can be assessed."

This is a complete list of critically endangered plant species, subspecies and varieties evaluated by the IUCN. Species considered possibly extinct by the IUCN are marked as such.

== Algae ==
- Galaxaura barbata (possibly extinct)
- Gracilaria skottsbergii
- Laurencia oppositocladia
- Myriogramme kylinii
- Phycodrina elegans (possibly extinct)
- Schizymenia ecuadoreana

== Bryophytes ==
There are 24 bryophyte species assessed as critically endangered.

=== Mosses ===
- Acritodon nephophilus
- Brymela tutezona
- Ditrichum cornubicum
- Fissidens hydropogon
- Lepidopilum grevilleanum
- Limbella fryei
- Neckeropsis pocsii
- Ochyraea tatrensis
- Ozobryum ogalalense
- Pinnatella limbata
- Taxitheliella richardsii
- Thamnobryum angustifolium
- Weissia multicapsularis

=== Liverworts ===
- Bazzania bhutanica
- Bryopteris gaudichaudii
- Drepanolejeunea senticosa
- Geothallus tuberosus
- Kurzia sinensis
- Myriocolea irrorata
- Phycolepidozia exigua
- Schistochila undulatifolia
- Sphaerolejeunea umbilicata, synonym of Lejeunea drehwaldii
- Spruceanthus theobromae
- Vandiemenia ratkowskiana

== Pteridophytes ==
There are 67 species and three varieties of pteridophyte assessed as critically endangered.

=== Leptosporangiate ferns ===
There are 54 species and three varieties in the class Polypodiopsida assessed as critically endangered.

==== Polypodiales ====
There are 49 species and three varieties in the order Polypodiales assessed as critically endangered.

===== Aspleniaceae =====
- Asplenium complanatum
- Asplenium daghestanicum, Dagestanian spleenwort
- Asplenium dielerectum, Asplenium-diellia
- Asplenium dielfalcatum
- Asplenium diellaciniatum
- Asplenium dielmannii
- Asplenium dielpallidum
- Asplenium haughtonii, Barn fern
- Asplenium schizotrichum
- Asplenium unisorum

===== Dryopteridaceae =====
Species

- Ctenitis pallatangana (possibly extinct)
- Ctenitis squamigera, Pacific lacefern
- Dryopteris cognata, Large kidney fern
- Elaphoglossum actinolepis
- Elaphoglossum angamarcanum
- Elaphoglossum bonapartii
- Elaphoglossum chodatii
- Elaphoglossum christii
- Elaphoglossum cladotrichium
- Elaphoglossum corazonense
- Elaphoglossum dimorphum, Toothed tongue-fern
- Elaphoglossum gossypinum
- Elaphoglossum gracilipes (possibly extinct)
- Elaphoglossum jamesonii
- Elaphoglossum longissimum
- Elaphoglossum nervosum, Veined tongue-fern
- Elaphoglossum pellucidum
- Elaphoglossum polytrichum (possibly extinct)
- Elaphoglossum pteropodum
- Elaphoglossum sodiroi
- Elaphoglossum sprucei
- Elaphoglossum trichophorum
- Lastreopsis subrecedens
- Polystichum drepanum, Madeira shield-fern

Varieties

- Dryopteris crinalis var. podosorus
- Dryopteris glabra var. flynnii
- Dryopteris glabra var. pusilla

===== Polypodiaceae =====
- Platycerium grande, Giant Staghorn Fern

===== Other Polypodiales species =====
- Adenophorus periens (possibly extinct)
- Anogramma ascensionis, Ascension Island parsley fern
- Athyrium rondoense
- Blotiella coriacea (possibly extinct)
- Cystoathyrium chinense
- Diplazium molokaiense
- Diplazium ulugurense (possibly extinct)
- Doryopteris angelica
- Melpomene brevipes (possibly extinct)
- Polypodium abitaguae
- Pteris adscensionis
- Pteris lidgatei
- Sadleria wagneriana
- Thelypteris bonapartii
- Xiphopteris ascensionensis

==== Hymenophyllales ====
- Hymenophyllum contractile
- Hymenophyllum helicoideum
- Hymenophyllum tenerum
- Trichomanes fulgens

==== Salviniales ====
- Marsilea fadeniana

=== Isoetopsida ===
- Isoetes dispora
- Isoetes heldreichii, Pindus quillwort (possibly extinct)
- Isoetes hewitsonii
- Isoetes malinverniana, Piedmont quillwort
- Isoetes nigroreticulata
- Isoetes olympica, Olympic quillwort
- Isoetes sinensis (possibly extinct)
- Isoetes stephansenii
- Isoetes taiwanensis
- Isoetes wormaldii

=== Other pteridophyte species ===
- Mankyua chejuense
- Phlegmariurus nutans
- Ptisana purpurascens

== Gymnosperms ==
There are 81 species, five subspecies, and 13 varieties of gymnosperm assessed as critically endangered.

=== Cycads ===
Species

- Ceratozamia euryphyllidia
- Ceratozamia fuscoviridis
- Ceratozamia huastecorum
- Ceratozamia kuesteriana
- Ceratozamia miqueliana
- Ceratozamia zaragozae
- Ceratozamia zoquorum
- Cycas annaikalensis
- Cycas chamaoensis
- Cycas curranii, Curran's pitogo
- Cycas debaoensis
- Cycas fugax
- Cycas hongheensis
- Cycas pachypoda
- Cycas szechuanensis
- Cycas tansachana
- Cycas wadei, Wade's pitogo
- Cycas zambalensis
- Cycas zeylanica
- Encephalartos aemulans, Ngotshe cycad
- Encephalartos cerinus, Waxen cycad (possibly extinct)
- Encephalartos cupidus, Blyde river cycad
- Encephalartos dolomiticus, Wolkberg cycad
- Encephalartos dyerianus, Lillie cycad
- Encephalartos equatorialis
- Encephalartos heenanii, Heenan's cycad
- Encephalartos hirsutus, Venda cycad (possibly extinct)
- Encephalartos inopinus, Lydenburg cycad
- Encephalartos kanga, Mnanasi Pori
- Encephalartos laevifolius, Kaapsehoop cycad
- Encephalartos latifrons, Albany cycad
- Encephalartos middelburgensis, Middelburg cycad
- Encephalartos msinganus, Msinga cycad
- Encephalartos pterogonus, Toothed-cone cycad
- Encephalartos sclavoi, Sclavo's cycad
- Encephalartos whitelockii
- Microcycas calocoma
- Zamia disodon
- Zamia gentryi
- Zamia grijalvensis
- Zamia hymenophyllidia
- Zamia inermis
- Zamia katzeriana
- Zamia macrochiera
- Zamia montana
- Zamia monticola
- Zamia prasina
- Zamia purpurea
- Zamia pygmaea
- Zamia restrepoi
- Zamia spartea
- Zamia urep
- Zamia vazquezii, Little chamal
- Zamia wallisii

Subspecies

- Cycas szechuanensis subsp. fairylakea
- Cycas szechuanensis subsp. szechuanensis
- Encephalartos tegulaneus subsp. powysii

=== Conifers ===
Species

- Abies beshanzuensis, Baishan fir
- Abies nebrodensis, Sicilian fir
- Abies numidica, Algerian fir
- Abies yuanbaoshanensis, Yuanbaoshan fir
- Acmopyle sahniana
- Agathis montana, Mount Panié kauri
- Araucaria angustifolia, Parana pine
- Araucaria nemorosa
- Cupressus dupreziana, Saharan cypress
- Dacrydium guillauminii
- Glyptostrobus pensilis, Chinese swamp cypress
- Juniperus bermudiana, Bermuda cedar
- Juniperus saxicola
- Libocedrus chevalieri
- Pherosphaera fitzgeraldii
- Picea koyamae, Koyama's spruce
- Picea neoveitchii, Veitch's spruce
- Pinus cernua
- Pinus squamata
- Pinus torreyana, Torrey pine
- Taxus floridana, Florida yew
- Torreya taxifolia, Florida nutmeg tree
- Widdringtonia cedarbergensis, Clanwilliam cedar
- Widdringtonia whytei, Mulanje cedar
- Wollemia nobilis, Wollemi pine

Subspecies

- Abies delavayi subsp. fansipanensis, Fansipan fir
- Pinus torreyana subsp. torreyana

Varieties

- Amentotaxus argotaenia var. brevifolia
- Cupressus arizonica var. montana, San Pedro cypress
- Cupressus arizonica var. stephensonii, Cuyamaca cypress
- Cupressus chengiana var. jiangeensis
- Cupressus dupreziana var. atlantica, Atlas cypress
- Cupressus dupreziana var. dupreziana
- Cupressus goveniana var. abramsiana
- Juniperus barbadensis var. barbadensis, Barbados cedar
- Juniperus deppeana var. sperryi
- Juniperus gracilior var. ekmanii
- Picea asperata var. ponderosa
- Pinus massoniana var. hainanensis

==== Podocarpaceae ====
- Acmopyle sahniana
- Dacrydium guillauminii
- Pherosphaera fitzgeraldii
- Podocarpus costaricensis
- Podocarpus palawanensis
- Podocarpus perrieri (possibly extinct)
- Podocarpus sellowii var. angustifolius
- Podocarpus urbanii, Blue mountain yacca

== Dicotyledons ==
There are 1895 species, 78 subspecies, and 49 varieties of dicotyledon assessed as critically endangered.

=== Apiales ===
There are 51 species and two varieties in the order Apiales assessed as critically endangered.

==== Apiaceae ====
- Apium bermejoi
- Athamanta cortiana
- Bupleurum dianthifolium
- Bupleurum elatum
- Bupleurum kakiskalae
- Bupleurum latissimum
- Chaerophyllum karsianum, Karsian chervil
- Chaerophyllum posofianum, Posofian chervil
- Ferula mervynii, Mervyn's giant fennel
- Horstrissea dolinicola
- Laserpitium longiradium
- Ligusticum huteri
- Monizia edulis
- Naufraga balearica
- Niphogeton sprucei
- Sanicula mariversa
- Sanicula purpurea

==== Araliaceae ====
Species

- Aralia rex
- Astropanax procumbens
- Dendropanax cordifolius
- Dendropanax filipes
- Dendropanax grandiflorus
- Dendropanax grandis
- Dendropanax hondurensis
- Dendropanax oligodontus
- Heptapleurum agamae
- Heptapleurum curranii
- Heptapleurum heptaphyllum
- Heptapleurum kuchingense
- Heptapleurum marlipoense
- Heptapleurum parvifoliolatum
- Merrilliopanax chinensis
- Meryta brachypoda
- Meryta salicifolia
- Oreopanax lehmannii
- Oreopanax lempiranus
- Osmoxylon mariannense
- Plerandra baillonii
- Plerandra sp. "letocartiorum"
- Plerandra sp. "mackeei"
- Plerandra sp. "memaoyaensis"
- Plerandra sp. "pouemboutensis"
- Polyscias aemiliguineae
- Polyscias bisattenuata
- Polyscias flynnii
- Polyscias gracilis
- Polyscias gymnocarpa, Koolau tetraplasandra
- Polyscias lionnetii
- Polyscias neraudiana
- Polyscias paniculata
- Polyscias racemosa
- Polyscias rodriguesiana
- Polyscias tahitensis

Varieties

- Polyscias sechellarum var. contracta
- Polyscias sechellarum var. curiosae

==== Pittosporaceae ====
- Pittosporum coriaceum
- Pittosporum raivavaeense
- Pittosporum tanianum
- Pittosporum viridulum

==== Torricelliaceae ====
- Melanophylla angustior
- Melanophylla perrieri

=== Aquifoliales ===
==== Aquifoliaceae ====
Species

- Ilex cookii, Cook's holly
- Ilex khasiana
- Ilex machilifolia
- Ilex maclurei
- Ilex perlata
- Ilex reticulata
- Ilex subtriflora
- Ilex williamsii

Subspecies

- Ilex perado subsp. iberica
- Ilex perado subsp. lopezlilloi

==== Stemonuraceae ====
- Gomphandra bracteata
- Gomphandra dinagatensis
- Gomphandra dolichocarpa
- Gomphandra fuliginea
- Gomphandra halconensis
- Gomphandra lancifolia
- Gomphandra pseudojavanica
- Gomphandra sawiensis
- Stemonurus apicalis

=== Asterales ===
Species

- Achyrocline glandulosa
- Achyrocline mollis
- Aetheolaena hypoleuca (possibly extinct)
- Aetheolaena ledifolia (possibly extinct)
- Aetheolaena pichinchensis (possibly extinct)
- Andryala crithmifolia
- Anisopappus burundiensis (possibly extinct)
- Anthemis glaberrima
- Argyranthemum winteri
- Argyroxiphium kauense, Kau silversword
- Artemisia insipida
- Artemisia kauaiensis (possibly extinct)
- Aster quitensis (possibly extinct)
- Baccharis aretioides
- Baccharis fusca (possibly extinct)
- Bidens simplicifolia
- Bidens wiebkei
- Bothriocline auriculata
- Brachyglottis pentacopa
- Cadiscus aquaticus
- Calendula maritima, Sea marigold
- Centaurea akamantis, Akamas centaury
- Centaurea caroli-henrici, Karl-henrikh's centaury
- Centaurea corensis
- Centaurea demirizii, Demiriz's centaury
- Centaurea drabifolioides, Whitlow-grass-leaved centaury
- Centaurea heldreichii
- Centaurea leptophylla, Thin-leaved centaury
- Centaurea tamanianiae, Tamanyan's centaury
- Centaurea vavilovii, Vavilov's centaury
- Centaurodendron dracaenoides
- Centaurodendron palmiforme
- Cheirolophus crassifolius, Maltese centaury
- Cheirolophus duranii
- Cheirolophus metlesicsii
- Cheirolophus santos-abreui
- Cirsium davisianum
- Cirsium eliasianum
- Commidendrum robustum, gumwood
- Commidendrum rotundifolium, bastard gumwood
- Commidendrum spurium, false gumwood
- Cotula myriophylloides (possibly extinct)
- Cylindrocline commersonii
- Dasphyllum lehmannii
- Dendroseris berteroana
- Dendroseris gigantea
- Dendroseris litoralis
- Dendroseris macrantha
- Dendroseris macrophylla
- Dendroseris marginata
- Dendroseris micrantha
- Dendroseris neriifolia
- Dendroseris pinnata
- Dendroseris pruinata
- Dendroseris regia
- Dicoma pretoriensis, synonym of Macledium pretoriense (possibly extinct)
- Dubautia herbstobatae
- Dubautia kalalauensis
- Dubautia kenwoodii (possibly extinct)
- Dubautia latifolia
- Dubautia pauciflorula
- Egletes humifusa (possibly extinct)
- Elaphandra retroflexa (possibly extinct)
- Erigeron adscendens
- Faujasiopsis reticulata
- Fitchia cordata
- Gazania thermalis
- Gnaphalium sodiroi
- Gutenbergia pubescens
- Helichrysum artvinense, Artvinian everlasting
- Helichrysum melitense, Maltese everlasting
- Hesperomannia arborescens, Lanai hesperomannia
- Hesperomannia arbuscula, Maui hesperomannia
- Hesperomannia lydgatei, Kauai hesperomannia
- Hieracium debile
- Hieracium lucidum
- Hypochaeris oligocephala
- Jacobaea trapezuntina, Trapezuntian groundsel
- Jurinea akinfievii, Akinfiev's jurinea
- Jurinea fontqueri
- Lamyropsis microcephala
- Lipochaeta fauriei
- Lipochaeta kamolensis
- Lipochaeta micrantha
- Lipochaeta tenuifolia
- Lipochaeta waimeaensis
- Mikania andrei
- Mikania iserniana (possibly extinct)
- Mikania jamesonii
- Mikania seemannii (possibly extinct)
- Mikania stereolepis
- Mikania tafallana
- Monactis dubia
- Monarrhenus salicifolius
- Onopordum carduelium
- Onopordum nogalesii
- Pericallis hadrosoma
- Pericallis malvifolia
- Pladaroxylon leucadendron, He cabbage tree
- Podospermum grossheimii, Grossheimi's salsify
- Podospermum idae, Ida's salsify
- Psephellus adjaricus, Adjarian psephellus
- Psephellus avaricus, Awarian centaury
- Psephellus gracillimus
- Psiadia cataractae
- Pulicaria filaginoides
- Remya montgomeryi
- Saussurea costus
- Scalesia atractyloides
- Scalesia divisa
- Scalesia gordilloi
- Scorzonera ketzkhovelii, Ketskhoveli's salsify
- Scorzonera kozlowskyi, Kozlovskiy's salsify
- Senecio alboranicus
- Senecio lamarckianus
- Senecio navugabensis (possibly extinct)
- Sonchus araraticus, Araratian sow-thistle
- Sonchus erzincanicus
- Sonchus gandogeri
- Talamancalia putcalensis, synonym of Lomanthus putcalensis
- Tanacetum oshanahanii
- Tanacetum oxystegium, sharp-stegium tansy
- Tetramolopium rockii
- Tragopogon makaschwilii, Makashvilis's goat's beard
- Tragopogon otschiaurii, Ochiauri's goat's beard
- Verbesina caymanensis
- Viguiera media
- Wedelia oxylepis
- Wilkesia hobdyi, Dwarf iliau

Subspecies

- Argyroxiphium sandwicense subsp. sandwicense, Mauna Kea silversword
- Bidens campylotheca subsp. pentamera
- Bidens campylotheca subsp. waihoiensis
- Bidens micrantha subsp. ctenophylla
- Dubautia plantaginea subsp. humilis
- Dubautia plantaginea subsp. magnifolia
- Fitchia cuneata subsp. cuneata
- Melanthera micrantha subsp. exigua
- Melanthera micrantha subsp. micrantha

Varieties

- Bidens hendersonensis var. oenoensis
- Pectis caymanensis var. robusta
- Scalesia atractyloides var. atractyloides
- Scalesia atractyloides var. darwinii
- Tetramolopium rockii var. calcisabulorum

=== Aristolochiales ===
- Aristolochia utriformis
- Aristolochia westlandii
- Asarum gusk
- Asarum monodoriflorum
- Asarum okinawense
- Asarum pellucidum
- Asarum tabatanum
- Pararistolochia preussii, synonym of Aristolochia preussii

=== Boraginales ===
==== Boraginaceae ====
- Amsinckia marginata (possibly extinct)
- Echium acanthocarpum
- Echium handiense
- Gyrocaryum oppositifolium
- Nonea karsensis, Karsian nonea
- Onosma arcuata, curved goldendrop
- Onosma nigricaulis, black-stemmed goldendrop
- Solenanthus reverchonii
- Symphytum savvalense, Savvalian comfrey
- Tournefortia obtusiflora (possibly extinct)
- Varronia bellonis
- Varronia rupicola
- Varronia urticacea
- Varronia wagnerorum, Wagners' cordia

==== Cordiaceae ====
- Cordia leslieae

=== Brassicales ===
There are 30 species and one variety in Capparales assessed as critically endangered.

==== Brassicaceae ====
Species

- Aethionema retsina
- Arabis kennedyae, Troodos rockcress
- Biscutella rotgesii
- Brassica macrocarpa
- Coronopus navasii
- Crambe feuillei
- Crambe sventenii
- Crambe tamadabensis
- Crambe wildpretii
- Diplotaxis siettiana
- Diplotaxis vicentina
- Draba ecuadoriana
- Draba narmanensis, Narmanian whitlow-grass
- Draba violacea
- Erucastrum palustre
- Erysimum deflexum, Bent treacle mustard
- Erysimum kykkoticum
- Hornungia angustilimbata, Narrow-limbed hornungia
- Lepidium arbuscula
- Lepidium orbiculare
- Lepidium turczaninowii
- Rorippa valdes-bermejoi
- Sinapidendron angustifolium
- Sinapidendron rupestre
- Thlaspi zangezuricum, Zangezurian pennycress

Varieties

- Aethionema grandiflorum var. sintenisii, Persian stonecress

==== Capparaceae ====
- Cadaba insularis
- Capparis mirifica
- Capparis panamensis
- Podandrogyne trichopus

=== Buxales ===
==== Buxaceae ====
- Buxus vahlii, Vahl's boxwood

=== Campanulales ===
There are 62 species and 12 subspecies in Campanulales assessed as critically endangered.

==== Campanulaceae ====
Species

- Brighamia insignis
- Brighamia rockii
- Burmeistera asplundii
- Burmeistera rubrosepala
- Campanula aghrica, Aghrian bellflower
- Campanula kantschavelii, Kanchaveli's bellflower
- Campanula lazica, Lazian campanula
- Campanula seraglio, Serail bellflower
- Campanula troegerae
- Centropogon albostellatus
- Centropogon brachysiphoniatus (possibly extinct)
- Centropogon cazaletii
- Centropogon pilalensis
- Centropogon solisii
- Centropogon uncinatus
- Clermontia peleana
- Clermontia pyrularia, Pear clermontia
- Cyanea acuminata, Honolulu cyanea
- Cyanea asarifolia
- Cyanea asplenifolia
- Cyanea calycina
- Cyanea crispa
- Cyanea dunbariae
- Cyanea gibsonii
- Cyanea glabra
- Cyanea grimesiana
- Cyanea hamatiflora
- Cyanea horrida
- Cyanea humboldtiana
- Cyanea kolekoleensis (possibly extinct)
- Cyanea konahuanuiensis
- Cyanea kuhihewa
- Cyanea lobata
- Cyanea longiflora
- Cyanea magnicalyx
- Cyanea mannii
- Cyanea marksii, Mark's cyanea
- Cyanea mceldowneyi
- Cyanea platyphylla
- Cyanea procera, Haha
- Cyanea remyi
- Cyanea rivularis
- Cyanea shipmanii
- Cyanea stictophylla
- Cyanea st.-johnii, St John's rollandia
- Cyanea truncata, Punaluu cyanea
- Cyanea undulata
- Delissea kauaiensis
- Delissea rhytidosperma (possibly extinct in the wild)
- Delissea takeuchii (possibly extinct)
- Delissea waianaeensis
- Lobelia gaudichaudii
- Lobelia koolauensis
- Lobelia monostachya
- Lobelia oahuensis
- Muehlbergella oweriniana, Owerin's muchlenbergella
- Sclerotheca viridiflora
- Siphocampylus loxensis (possibly extinct)
- Siphocampylus uncipes
- Trematolobelia singularis
- Wahlenbergia linifolia, Large bellflower
- Wahlenbergia malaissei

Subspecies

- Clermontia oblongifolia subsp. brevipes, Oahu clermontia
- Clermontia oblongifolia subsp. mauiensis
- Clermontia peleana subsp. peleana
- Clermontia peleana subsp. singuliflora
- Clermontia samuelii subsp. hanaensis
- Clermontia samuelii subsp. samuelii
- Cyanea grimesiana subsp. grimesiana
- Cyanea grimesiana subsp. obatae
- Cyanea hamatiflora subsp. carlsonii
- Cyanea hamatiflora subsp. hamatiflora
- Cyanea lobata subsp. baldwinii
- Cyanea lobata subsp. lobata

==== Goodeniaceae ====
- Scaevola socotraensis

=== Canellales ===
==== Canellaceae ====
- Cinnamodendron angustifolium
- Cinnamodendron cubense
- Cinnamodendron occhionianum
- Pleodendron costaricense
- Pleodendron ekmanii
- Pleodendron macranthum
- Warburgia elongata
- Warburgia ugandensis subsp. longifolia

==== Winteraceae ====
- Pseudowintera insperata

=== Caryophyllales ===
There are 145 species, two subspecies, and one variety in the order Caryophyllales assessed as critically endangered.

==== Amaranthaceae ====
Species

- Amaranthus brownii
- Atriplex plebeja
- Beta patula
- Charpentiera densiflora, dense-flowered charpentiera
- Patellifolia webbiana

Varieties

- Achyranthes splendens var. rotundata

==== Caryophyllaceae ====
Species

- Allochrusa takhtajanii, Takhtadjyan's allochrusa
- Alsinidendron lychnoides
- Alsinidendron obovatum
- Alsinidendron trinerve, Three nerved alsinidendron
- Alsinidendron viscosum, Climbing alsinidendron
- Arenaria bolosii
- Arenaria nevadensis
- Arenaria radians
- Bufonia takhtajanii, Takhtadjyan's bufonia
- Dianthus morisianus
- Drymaria monticola
- Minuartia dirphya
- Saponaria jagelii
- Schiedea adamantis
- Schiedea apokremnos
- Schiedea attenuata (possibly extinct in the wild)
- Schiedea haleakalensis
- Schiedea helleri
- Schiedea hookeri
- Schiedea kaalae
- Schiedea kauaiensis
- Schiedea kealiae
- Schiedea membranacea
- Schiedea nuttallii
- Schiedea perlmanii
- Schiedea stellarioides
- Schiedea verticillata
- Schiedea viscosa
- Silene alexandri
- Silene chustupica, Khustup campion
- Silene cobalticola
- Silene gazulensis
- Silene ispirensis, Ispirian catchfly
- Silene nocteolens
- Silene perlmanii (possibly extinct in the wild)

Subspecies

- Moehringia intricata subsp. tejedensis

==== Cactus ====
Species

- Acharagma aguirreanum
- Arrojadoa albiflora
- Arrojadoa marylaniae
- Astrophytum caput-medusae
- Cereus alex-bragae
- Cereus estevesii, synonym of Cereus albicaulis subsp. estevesii (possibly extinct in the wild)
- Cereus saddianus
- Cipocereus pusilliflorus
- Cleistocactus hoffmannii
- Cleistocactus xylorhizus
- Coleocephalocereus braunii
- Coleocephalocereus diersianus
- Coleocephalocereus purpureus
- Consolea corallicola, Florida semaphore cactus
- Consolea falcata
- Copiapoa ahremephiana
- Copiapoa angustiflora
- Copiapoa decorticans
- Copiapoa esmeraldana
- Corynopuntia reflexispina
- Coryphantha potosiana
- Cylindropuntia hystrix
- Discocactus cangaensis
- Discocactus hartmannii
- Discocactus petr-halfari
- Discocactus subterraneo-proliferans (possibly extinct in the wild)
- Echinocereus nivosus
- Echinopsis walteri
- Eriosyce chilensis
- Eriosyce laui
- Gymnocalycium albiareolatum
- Gymnocalycium neuhuberi
- Gymnocalycium ragonesei
- Haageocereus pacalaensis
- Haageocereus tenuis
- Hylocereus escuintlensis
- Leptocereus carinatus
- Leptocereus grantianus
- Leptocereus leonii
- Leptocereus scopulophilus
- Leptocereus wrightii
- Mammillaria albiflora
- Mammillaria anniana
- Mammillaria carmenae
- Mammillaria duwei
- Mammillaria glochidiata
- Mammillaria herrerae, Golf ball
- Mammillaria humboldtii
- Mammillaria laui
- Mammillaria manana
- Mammillaria marcosii
- Mammillaria pennispinosa
- Mammillaria sanchez-mejoradae
- Mammillaria schwarzii
- Mammillaria theresae
- Mammillaria zeilmanniana
- Matucana aureiflora
- Matucana huagalensis
- Matucana madisoniorum
- Matucana ritteri
- Melocactus braunii
- Melocactus brederooianus
- Melocactus conoideus
- Melocactus ferreophilus
- Micranthocereus streckeri
- Myrtillocactus eichlamii
- Opuntia abjecta
- Opuntia chaffeyi
- Parodia arnostiana
- Parodia buiningii
- Parodia crassigibba
- Parodia herteri
- Parodia neohorstii
- Parodia nivosa
- Parodia nothorauschii
- Parodia rechensis
- Parodia werdermanniana
- Pediocactus knowltonii, Knowlton's cactus
- Peniocereus maculatus
- Peniocereus occidentalis
- Peniocereus zopilotensis
- Pereskia quisqueyana, synonym of Leuenbergeria quisqueyana
- Pilosocereus azulensis
- Pilosocereus diersianus
- Pygmaeocereus bylesianus
- Rhipsalis mesembryanthemoides
- Rhipsalis pentaptera
- Rhipsalis triangularis
- Sclerocactus brevispinus, Pariette cactus
- Stenocereus chacalapensis
- Turbinicarpus alonsoi
- Turbinicarpus gielsdorfianus
- Turbinicarpus hoferi
- Turbinicarpus laui
- Turbinicarpus mandragora
- Turbinicarpus swobodae
- Uebelmannia buiningii
- Weberocereus frohningiorum

Subspecies

- Ariocarpus bravoanus subsp. bravoanus

==== Droseraceae ====
- Drosera insolita
- Drosera katangensis

==== Nepenthaceae ====
- Nepenthes aristolochioides
- Nepenthes attenboroughii, Attenborough's pitcher plant
- Nepenthes clipeata
- Nepenthes dubia
- Nepenthes lavicola
- Nepenthes macrophylla
- Nepenthes rigidifolia
- Nepenthes sumatrana
- Nepenthes suratensis

==== Nyctaginaceae ====
- Abronia alpina
- Pisonia graciliscens
- Pisonia margaretiae

==== Polygonaceae ====
- Calligonum calcareum
- Calligonum triste
- Coccoloba cholutecensis
- Coccoloba lindaviana
- Coccoloba retirensis
- Polygonum caspicum, Caspian knotweed
- Polygonum toktogulicum
- Rumex tunetanus

==== Other Caryophyllales ====
Species

- Delosperma macellum
- Kewa acida, salad plant
- Khadia beswickii

=== Celastrales ===
There are 29 species and two subspecies in the order Celastrales assessed as critically endangered.

==== Celastraceae ====
- Bhesa nitidissima
- Bhesa sinica
- Cassine koordersii
- Euonymus pallidifolia, synonym of Glyptopetalum pallidifolium
- Maytenus eggersii
- Maytenus harrisii
- Maytenus williamsii
- Platypterocarpus tanganyikensis
- Pristimera biholongii
- Pristimera breteleri
- Salacia conraui
- Salacia villiersii
- Simirestis klaineana
- Simirestis staudtii
- Tontelea hondurensis

==== Dichapetalaceae ====
- Dichapetalum korupinum
- Dichapetalum letouzeyi

=== Cornales ===
- Nyssa yunnanensis
- Swida darvasica

=== Cucurbitales ===
Species

- Begonia asympeltata
- Begonia minuta
- Begonia montis-elephantis
- Begonia salaziensis
- Begonia stellata

Subspecies

- Begonia quadrialata subsp. dusenii

=== Dipsacales ===
- Centranthus amazonum
- Cephalaria anatolica, Anatolian cephalaria
- Lonicera karataviensis
- Nardostachys jatamansi
- Valeriana leschenaultii
- Viburnum divaricatum (possibly extinct)
- Viburnum hondurense
- Viburnum molinae
- Viburnum subpubescens

=== Dilleniales ===
- Dillenia triquetra
- Hibbertia bouletii
- Hibbertia favieri
- Schumacheria alnifolia

=== Ericales ===
==== Actinidiaceae ====
- Saurauia bogoriensis
- Saurauia punduana

==== Balsaminaceae ====
- Impatiens adenioides
- Impatiens angustisepala
- Impatiens bururiensis
- Impatiens gordonii, Seychelles bizzie lizzie
- Impatiens grandisepala

==== Clethraceae ====
- Clethra coloradensis

==== Ebenaceae ====
- Diospyros angulata
- Diospyros benstonei
- Diospyros chrysophyllos
- Diospyros crumenata
- Diospyros egrettarum
- Diospyros hemiteles
- Diospyros katendei (possibly extinct)
- Diospyros lolinopsis
- Diospyros molissima
- Diospyros moonii
- Diospyros mun
- Diospyros nodosa
- Diospyros rheophytica
- Diospyros vaccinioides, Small persimmon
- Diospyros veillonii

==== Ericaceae ====
Species

- Rhododendron wilhelminae
- Rhodothamnus sessilifolius, Sessile-leaved rhodothamnus

Varieties

- Rhododendron protistum var. giganteum

==== Lecythidaceae ====
Species

- Cariniana penduliflora
- Couratari asterophora
- Couratari asterotricha
- Couratari prancei
- Eschweilera amplexifolia
- Eschweilera compressa
- Gustavia latifolia
- Gustavia longifuniculata
- Napoleonaea lutea
- Napoleonaea reptans

Subspecies

- Eschweilera piresii subsp. viridipetala

==== Myrsinaceae ====
- Ardisia byrsonimae
- Ardisia etindensis
- Ardisia oligantha
- Ardisia schlechteri
- Badula crassa
- Badula platyphylla
- Badula reticulata
- Gentlea molinae
- Myrsine andersonii
- Myrsine brownii
- Myrsine hartii
- Myrsine juddii
- Myrsine longifolia
- Myrsine mezii
- Myrsine ronuiensis
- Parathesis eggersiana
- Rapanea ceylanica
- Rapanea seychellarum

==== Primulaceae ====
- Lysimachia daphnoides
- Lysimachia iniki
- Lysimachia lydgatei
- Lysimachia maxima
- Lysimachia ovoidea
- Lysimachia pendens
- Lysimachia scopulensis
- Lysimachia venosa
- Primula boveana, Sinai primrose

==== Sapotaceae ====
- Aubregrinia taiensis
- Aulandra beccarii, synonym of Palaquium beccarii
- Autranella congolensis
- Chrysophyllum claraense
- Chrysophyllum durifructum
- Chrysophyllum euryphyllum
- Chrysophyllum superbum
- Leptostylis goroensis
- Madhuca boerlageana
- Madhuca insignis
- Madhuca markleeana
- Manilkara gonavensis
- Manilkara spectabilis
- Micropholis caudata
- Micropholis grandiflora
- Micropholis macrophylla
- Palaquium laevifolium
- Payena kapitensis
- Pouteria cinnamomea
- Pouteria espinae
- Pouteria euryphylla
- Pouteria gigantea
- Pouteria micrantha
- Pouteria pachycalyx
- Pouteria pallens
- Pouteria polysepala
- Pouteria subsessilifolia
- Pradosia decipiens
- Pradosia verrucosa
- Sideroxylon nadeaudii
- Sideroxylon retinerve
- Sideroxylon rubiginosum
- Synsepalum brenanii

==== Sarraceniaceae ====
Species

- Sarracenia oreophila, green pitcherplant

Subspecies

- Sarracenia rubra subsp. alabamensis

==== Styracaceae ====
- Styrax portoricensis

==== Symplocaceae ====
- Symplocos versicolor

==== Theaceae ====
- Camellia azalea
- Camellia cupiformis
- Camellia fangchengensis
- Camellia fascicularis
- Camellia hekouensis
- Camellia ilicifolia
- Camellia impressinervis
- Camellia luteoflora
- Euryodendron excelsum
- Freziera euryoides
- Freziera forerorum
- Freziera inaequilatera
- Freziera roraimensis
- Freziera stuebelii
- Freziera subintegrifolia
- Freziera uniauriculata
- Freziera varibrateata
- Laplacea curtyana
- Ternstroemia bullata
- Ternstroemia glomerata
- Ternstroemia granulata
- Ternstroemia landae
- Ternstroemia luquillensis
- Ternstroemia subsessilis

==== Theophrastaceae ====
Species

- Clavija parvula

Varieties

- Jacquinia macrantha var. clarendonensis

=== Fabales ===
Species

- Acacia anegadensis, Pokemeboy
- Acacia belairioides
- Acacia mathuataensis
- Acacia roigii
- Aeschynomene ruspoliana (possibly extinct)
- Albizia vaughanii
- Alistilus magnificus
- Ammopiptanthus nanus
- Amorpha crenulata, Clusterspike false indigo
- Anthonotha leptorrhachis
- Astragalus acmophylloides, Sharp-leaved milk vetch
- Astragalus bylowae, Bylov's milk vetch
- Astragalus cavanillesii
- Astragalus daghestanicus, Daghestanian milk vetch
- Astragalus eliasianus, Eliasian milk vetch
- Astragalus igniarius
- Astragalus longivexillatus, Long-flagged milk vetch
- Astragalus magnificus, Big astragalus
- Astragalus maritimus
- Astragalus nigrocalycinus, Black-calyx milk vetch
- Astragalus olurensis, Olurian milk vetch
- Astragalus schachbuzensis, Shakhbuzian milk vetch
- Astragalus schmolliae, Schmoll's milkvetch
- Astragalus sinuatus, Whited's milkvetch
- Astragalus tatlii, Tatli's milk vetch
- Astragalus trabzonicus, Trabzonian milk vetch
- Astragalus tremolsianus
- Astragalus verrucosus
- Bauhinia seminarioi
- Berlinia hollandii
- Brachystegia oblonga
- Browneopsis macrofoliolata
- Cadia rubra
- Callerya neocaledonica (possibly extinct)
- Canavalia favieri
- Canavalia molokaiensis, Molokai jack-bean
- Canavalia napaliensis
- Canavalia pubescens
- Canavalia veillonii (possibly extinct)
- Chamaecrista seticrenata
- Chamaecrista souzana
- Chloroleucon tortum
- Chordospartium muritai, Coastal tree broom
- Clitoria andrei (possibly extinct)
- Coursetia cajamarcana
- Crudia bibundina
- Cynometra falcata
- Cynometra filifera
- Cynometra gillmanii
- Cytisus aeolicus
- Dalbergia intibucana
- Dalea sabinalis, Sabinal prairie-clover (possibly extinct)
- Delonix tomentosa (possibly extinct)
- Dialium travancoricum
- Dimorphandra wilsonii
- Eligmocarpus cynometroides
- Eriosema adamaouense
- Erythrina perrieri
- Erythrina schliebenii
- Erythrina tahitensis
- Gleditsia vestita
- Gymnocladus assamicus
- Hymenostegia talbotii
- Indigofera ankaratrensis
- Indigofera suarezensis
- Inga enterolobioides
- Inga lacustris
- Kanaloa kahoolawensis (possibly extinct in the wild)
- Kennedia retrorsa
- Lathyrus belinensis
- Lonchocarpus molinae
- Lonchocarpus phaseolifolius
- Lonchocarpus sanctuarii
- Lonchocarpus trifolius
- Lonchocarpus yoroensis
- Lotus armeniacus, Armenian bird's foot trefoil
- Lotus benoistii
- Lotus eremiticus
- Lotus kunkelii
- Lotus maculatus
- Lotus pyranthus
- Medicago citrina
- Mezoneuron kauaiense
- Microberlinia bisulcata
- Mimosa kitrokala (possibly extinct)
- Mimosa mensicola
- Mimosa morongii
- Monopetalanthus hedinii
- Neoharmsia baronii
- Newtonia camerunensis
- Ormocarpopsis itremoensis
- Orphanodendron bernalii
- Ostryocarpus zenkerianus
- Parkia parrii
- Parkinsonia peruviana
- Phaseolus lignosus, Bermuda bean
- Phaseolus rimbachii
- Phylloxylon arenicola
- Phylloxylon phillipsonii
- Phylloxylon xiphoclada
- Plagiosiphon longitubus
- Platymiscium albertinae
- Platysepalum scaberulum
- Polygala helenae
- Polygala quitensis, synonym of Senega quitensis (possibly extinct)
- Polygala sinisica
- Pteromonnina fosbergii
- Rhynchosia ledermannii (possibly extinct)
- Serianthes nelsonii
- Serianthes rurutensis
- Sophora mangarevaensis
- Sophora raivavaeensis
- Sophora rubriflora
- Stigmaphyllon nudiflorum
- Swartzia oraria
- Talbotiella gentii
- Teline nervosa
- Teline salsoloides
- Thermopsis turcica
- Triaspis schliebenii (possibly extinct)
- Trifolium bobrovii, Bobrov's clover
- Trifolium gillettianum
- Vachellia baessleri
- Vicia bifoliolata
- Vicia costae
- Vicia erzurumica, Erzurumian vetch
- Vicia ferreirensis
- Vicia fulgens
- Vicia menziesii, Hawaiian vetch
- Vicia quadrijuga, Quadrijugous vetch
- Vochysia aurifera
- Vouacapoua americana
- Xanthophyllum ceraceifolium
- Zornia vaughaniana

Subspecies

- Astragalus macrocarpus subsp. lefkarensis, Lefkara milk-vetch
- Byrsonima nemoralis subsp. dressleri

Varieties

- Humboldtia unijuga var. trijuga

=== Fagales ===
==== Betulaceae ====
Species

- Alnus djavanshirii
- Alnus dolichocarpa
- Alnus henryi (possibly extinct)
- Betula chichibuensis, Chichibu birch
- Betula gynoterminalis (possibly extinct)
- Betula klokovii
- Betula murrayana, Murray birch
- Carpinus hebestroma
- Carpinus langaoensis
- Carpinus putoensis, Puto hornbeam
- Carpinus tientaiensis
- Ostrya chisosensis, Chisos hop-hornbeam
- Ostrya rehderiana
- Populus berkarensis, synonym of Populus alba

Subspecies

- Betula lenta subsp. uber, Virginia round-leaf birch

==== Fagaceae ====
- Castanea dentata, American Chestnut
- Castanopsis birmanica
- Castanopsis catappifolia
- Castanopsis chapaensis
- Castanopsis densispinosa
- Castanopsis glabra
- Castanopsis longipes
- Castanopsis phuthoensis
- Castanopsis poilanei
- Castanopsis rufotomentosa
- Castanopsis thaiensis
- Castanopsis tranninhensis
- Lithocarpus braianensis
- Lithocarpus chevalieri
- Lithocarpus cinereus
- Lithocarpus coalitus
- Lithocarpus coinhensis
- Lithocarpus concentricus
- Lithocarpus dahuoaiensis
- Lithocarpus echinocarpus
- Lithocarpus elmerrillii
- Lithocarpus eriobotryifolius
- Lithocarpus formosanus
- Lithocarpus honbaensis
- Lithocarpus jacksonianus
- Lithocarpus laouanensis
- Lithocarpus leucodermis
- Lithocarpus loratifolius
- Lithocarpus melataiensis
- Lithocarpus nebularum
- Lithocarpus nhatrangensis
- Lithocarpus ochrocarpus
- Lithocarpus orbicarpus
- Lithocarpus orbicularis
- Lithocarpus paviei
- Lithocarpus platyphyllus
- Lithocarpus quangnamensis
- Lithocarpus rufescens
- Lithocarpus rufus
- Lithocarpus scyphiger
- Lithocarpus songkoensis
- Lithocarpus stenopus
- Lithocarpus toumorangensis
- Lithocarpus vinhensis
- Lithocarpus vuquangensis
- Lithocarpus yersinii
- Quercus albicaulis
- Quercus argyrotricha
- Quercus baniensis
- Quercus baolamensis
- Quercus bawanglingensis
- Quercus bidoupensis
- Quercus blaoensis
- Quercus boyntonii, Boynton oak
- Quercus cambodiensis
- Quercus camusiae
- Quercus dankiaensis
- Quercus dilacerata
- Quercus dinghuensis
- Quercus donnaiensis
- Quercus fimbriata
- Quercus graciliformis, Slender oak
- Quercus hinckleyi, Hinckley's oak
- Quercus honbaensis
- Quercus lungmaiensis
- Quercus mangdenensis
- Quercus marlipoensis
- Quercus monnula
- Quercus motuoensis
- Quercus mulleri
- Quercus pinbianensis
- Quercus pseudosetulosa
- Quercus pseudoverticillata
- Quercus semiserratoides
- Quercus sichourensis
- Quercus sontraensis
- Quercus thomsoniana
- Quercus tomentosinervis
- Quercus trungkhanhensis
- Quercus xuanlienensis

==== Myricaceae ====
- Myrica rivas-martinezii

==== Nothofagaceae ====
- Nothofagus nuda
- Nothofagus stylosa
- Nothofagus womersleyi

=== Gentianales ===
==== Apocynaceae ====
- Alstonia rupestris
- Amsonia orientalis, Blue star
- Hunteria hexaloba (possibly extinct)
- Kibatalia longifolia
- Lepinia taitensis
- Mandevilla jamesonii
- Neisosperma thiollierei, synonym of Ochrosia thiollierei
- Ochrosia inventorum
- Ochrosia nukuhivensis
- Ochrosia tahitensis
- Pachypodium eburneum
- Pachypodium inopinatum
- Prestonia parvifolia
- Prestonia schumanniana (possibly extinct)
- Rauvolfia sachetiae

==== Asclepiadaceae ====
Species

- Asclepias kamerunensis
- Cynanchum densiflorum
- Cynanchum serpyllifolium
- Cynanchum spruceanum
- Cynanchum velutinum
- Duvaliandra dioscoridis
- Goniostemma punctatum
- Matelea ecuadorensis (possibly extinct)
- Matelea orthoneura
- Matelea sprucei
- Metalepis gentryi
- Metalepis haughtii
- Metastelma anegadense
- Neoschumannia kamerunensis
- Pentastelma auritum
- Utleria salicifolia

Subspecies

- Ceropegia decidua subsp. pretoriensis
- Pentarrhinum abyssinicum subsp. ijimense

==== Gentianaceae ====
- Centaurium sebaeoides
- Exacum socotranum
- Gentiana kurroo

==== Loganiaceae ====
Species

- Geniostoma clavigerum
- Labordia cyrtandrae
- Labordia helleri
- Labordia hosakana
- Labordia lorenceana
- Labordia triflora
- Strychnos tetragona

Varieties

- Labordia tinifolia var. wahiawaensis

==== Rubiaceae ====
Species

- Arachnothryx chimboracensis
- Arachnothryx galeottii, synonym of Renistipula galeottii
- Aulacocalyx camerooniana
- Belonophora ongensis
- Chassalia capitata
- Chassalia laikomensis
- Cinchona glandulifera
- Coffea charrieriana
- Coprosma laevigata, Rarotongan coprosma
- Diplospora erythrospora
- Exostema glaberrimum
- Exostema orbiculatum
- Exostema salicifolium
- Gaertnera hirtiflora
- Gaertnera longifolia
- Gaertnera truncata
- Gardenia brighamii, Hawaiian gardenia
- Gardenia candida
- Gardenia mannii, Mann's gardenia
- Gardenia vitiensis
- Gonzalagunia bifida
- Gonzalagunia dodsonii
- Gonzalagunia mollis
- Guettarda longiflora
- Hymenodictyon seyrigii (possibly extinct)
- Ixora johnsonii
- Kadua coriacea
- Kadua degeneri
- Kadua flynnii
- Kadua haupuensis (possibly extinct in the wild)
- Kadua laxiflora
- Kadua parvula
- Kadua st-johnii
- Keetia bakossii
- Ladenbergia rubiginosa
- Lasianthus rhinophyllus
- Machaonia woodburyana
- Manettia canescens (possibly extinct)
- Manettia holwayi (possibly extinct)
- Manettia nebulosa
- Neonauclea gageana
- Nesohedyotis arborea, St Helena dogwood
- Oxyanthus okuensis
- Pavetta kupensis
- Pavetta rubentifolia
- Pentagonia peruviana
- Portlandia albiflora
- Prismatomeris andamanica
- Psathura sechellarum
- Psychotria bimbiensis
- Psychotria bryonicola
- Psychotria danceri
- Psychotria grantii
- Psychotria hanoverensis
- Psychotria minimicalyx
- Psychotria moliwensis
- Psychotria moseskemei
- Psychotria silhouettae
- Psychotria sodiroi
- Psychotria speciosa
- Psychotria tahitensis
- Psychotria trichocalyx
- Psychotria whistleri, Rarotonga psychotria
- Ramosmania rodriguesii
- Razafimandimbisonia regalis
- Rondeletia anguillensis
- Rondeletia buxifolia, Pribby
- Rondeletia cincta
- Rondeletia mornicola
- Rothmannia annae, Wright's gardenia
- Simira standleyi
- Stelechantha arcuata
- Stenostomum tomentosum
- Suberanthus pungens
- Tarenna hutchinsonii
- Timonius jambosella
- Tinadendron noumeanum
- Wendlandia andamanica

Subspecies

- Ixora scheffleri subsp. keniensis
- Kadua cordata subsp. remyi
- Kadua degeneri subsp. coprosmifolia
- Kadua degeneri subsp. degeneri

Varieties

- Chassalia coriacea var. johnstonii
- Coprosma rapensis var. benefica, red berry

=== Geraniales ===
- Erodium astragaloides
- Erodium hendrikii, Heron's bill
- Erodium sosnowskianum, Sosonovskiy's heron's-bill
- Geranium antisanae
- Geranium arboreum
- Geranium kauaiense
- Geranium maderense
- Pelargonium cotyledonis, old father live forever
- Pelargonium insularis
- Tropaeolum umbellatum

=== Icacinales ===
- Mappia longipes
- Mappia mexicana
- Pennantia baylisiana, Three kings kaikomako
- Pyrenacantha grandifolia
- Stachyanthus cuneatus
- Urandra apicalis

=== Lamiales ===
==== Acanthaceae ====
- Asystasia masaiensis
- Barleria observatrix
- Blepharis refracta
- Brachystephanus kupeensis
- Brachystephanus schliebenii
- Carlowrightia ecuadoriana
- Championella sarcorrhiza
- Crossandra acutiloba
- Crossandra cinnabarina
- Dicliptera dodsonii
- Dischistocalyx rivularis
- Hygrophila madurensis
- Isoglossa asystasioides
- Justicia callopsoidea
- Justicia drummondii
- Justicia mkungweensis
- Megalochlamys tanaensis
- Mellera insignis
- Psilanthele eggersii
- Sanchezia lampra
- Stenandrium carolinae, Caroline's pink

==== Bignoniaceae ====
- Amphitecna spathicalyx
- Chodanthus montecillensis
- Parmentiera morii
- Phyllarthron laxinervium
- Phyllarthron nocturnum
- Phyllarthron sahamalazensis
- Phyllarthron vokoaninensis
- Stereospermum zenkeri (possibly extinct)

==== Gesneriaceae ====
Species

- Columnea asteroloma
- Columnea manabiana
- Columnea poortmannii
- Cyrtandra crenata (possibly extinct)
- Cyrtandra dentata
- Cyrtandra kaulantha, Waikane Valley cyrtandra
- Cyrtandra lillianae, Te Manga cyrtandra
- Cyrtandra mareensis
- Cyrtandra paliku
- Cyrtandra polyantha, Niu Valley cyrtandra
- Cyrtandra rarotongensis, Rarotonga cyrtandra
- Cyrtandra subumbellata
- Cyrtandra viridiflora
- Diastema incisum
- Gasteranthus atratus
- Gasteranthus extinctus
- Monopyle paniculata
- Ornithoboea emarginata
- Paraboea albida
- Paraboea tarutaoensis
- Paraboea uniflora
- Primulina modesta
- Saintpaulia teitensis
- Saintpaulia ulugurensis
- Saintpaulia watkinsii
- Streptocarpus burttianus
- Streptocarpus euanthus
- Streptocarpus kimbozanus
- Streptocarpus thysanotus

Subspecies

- Saintpaulia ionantha subsp. grandifolia
- Saintpaulia ionantha subsp. rupicola

Varieties

- Gesneria scabra var. fawcettii

==== Lamiaceae ====
Species

- Aegiphila caymanensis
- Aegiphila glomerata
- Callicarpa ampla
- Cornutia obovata
- Cuminia eriantha
- Cuminia fernandezia
- Gmelina lignum-vitreum
- Hyptis argutifolia
- Hyptis diversifolia
- Karomia gigas
- Lamium tschorochense, Chorokhian dead nettle
- Micromeria glomerata
- Phyllostegia electra
- Phyllostegia haliakalae
- Phyllostegia helleri
- Phyllostegia hirsuta
- Phyllostegia hispida
- Phyllostegia kaalaensis
- Phyllostegia kahiliensis (possibly extinct)
- Phyllostegia knudsenii (possibly extinct)
- Phyllostegia mollis
- Phyllostegia parviflora
- Phyllostegia renovans
- Phyllostegia waimeae
- Phyllostegia warshaueri
- Phyllostegia wawrana
- Plectranthus dissitiflorus
- Plectranthus scopulicola (possibly extinct)
- Salvia caymanensis
- Salvia herbanica
- Salvia veneris, Kythrean sage
- Scutellaria rhomboidalis, Rhomboid skullcap
- Sideritis cystosiphon
- Sideritis discolor
- Sideritis marmorea
- Sideritis serrata
- Stachys bayburtensis, Bayburt woundwort
- Stachys choruhensis, Choruh woundwort
- Stachys sosnowskyi, Sosnowsky's woundwort
- Stenogyne bifida (possibly extinct in the wild)
- Stenogyne campanulata (possibly extinct in the wild)
- Stenogyne kanehoana (possibly extinct in the wild)
- Stenogyne kealiae
- Tectona philippinensis, Philippine teak
- Teucrium abutiloides
- Vitex yaundensis

Varieties

- Phyllostegia parviflora var. glabriuscula
- Phyllostegia parviflora var. lydgatei
- Phyllostegia parviflora var. parviflora

==== Oleaceae ====
- Chionanthus fluminensis
- Chionanthus proctorii
- Chionanthus subsessilis
- Chionanthus tenuis
- Fraxinus americana (white ash or American ash)
- Fraxinus hondurensis
- Fraxinus pennsylvanica (green ash or red ash)
- Jasminum azoricum
- Linociera albidiflora

==== Plantaginaceae ====
- Callitriche pulchra
- Plantago almogravensis
- Plantago famarae
- Plantago robusta, St Helena plantain

==== Scrophulariaceae ====
- Agalinis kingsii
- Antirrhinum charidemi
- Isoplexis chalcantha
- Odontites granatensis
- Paulownia kawakamii
- Scrophularia capillaris, Capillary figwort
- Verbascum decursivum, Decurrent mullein
- Verbascum transcaucasicum, Transcaucasian speedwell
- Veronica allahuekberensis, Allahuekberian speedwell
- Veronica oetaea

==== Verbenaceae ====
- Citharexylum quitense
- Citharexylum svensonii
- Stachytarpheta svensonii

==== Other Lamiales species ====
- Buddleja formosana
- Globularia ascanii
- Myoporum stokesii

=== Laurales ===
There are 40 species in the order Laurales assessed as critically endangered.

==== Hernandiaceae ====
- Hazomalania voyronii
- Hernandia cubensis
- Hernandia obovata
- Hernandia temarii

==== Lauraceae ====
- Actinodaphne archboldiana
- Actinodaphne caesia
- Actinodaphne cinerea
- Actinodaphne ellipticibacca
- Actinodaphne engleriana
- Actinodaphne fuliginosa
- Actinodaphne gracilis
- Actinodaphne latifolia
- Actinodaphne ledermannii
- Actinodaphne mansonii
- Actinodaphne menghaiensis
- Actinodaphne novoguineensis
- Actinodaphne obtusa
- Actinodaphne perglabra
- Actinodaphne pulchra
- Actinodaphne quercina
- Actinodaphne rumphii
- Actinodaphne solomonensis
- Aiouea elegans
- Aiouea floccosa
- Aiouea kruseana
- Aiouea leptophylla
- Aiouea opaca
- Aiouea palaciosii
- Alseodaphne griffithii
- Alseodaphne micrantha
- Alseodaphne ramosii
- Alseodaphne suboppositifolia
- Alseodaphne sulcata
- Alseodaphnopsis hokouensis
- Alseodaphnopsis marlipoensis
- Alseodaphnopsis ximengensis
- Andea antioquiensis
- Aniba ecuadorica
- Aniba novogranatensis
- Aniba pedicellata
- Aspidostemon capuronii
- Aspidostemon caudatus
- Aspidostemon grayi
- Aspidostemon inconspicuus (possibly extinct)
- Aspidostemon insignis
- Aspidostemon litoralis
- Aspidostemon macrophyllus
- Aspidostemon manongarivensis
- Aspidostemon masoalensis
- Aspidostemon occultus
- Aspidostemon reticulatus
- Aspidostemon synandra
- Aspidostemon triantherus
- Aspidostemon trichandra
- Beilschmiedia aborensis
- Beilschmiedia ambigua
- Beilschmiedia angustielliptica
- Beilschmiedia atra
- Beilschmiedia bracteata
- Beilschmiedia brandisii
- Beilschmiedia congestiflora
- Beilschmiedia crassipes
- Beilschmiedia descoingsii
- Beilschmiedia dielsiana
- Beilschmiedia donisii
- Beilschmiedia gallatlyi
- Beilschmiedia giorgii
- Beilschmiedia gitingensis
- Beilschmiedia hermanii
- Beilschmiedia jabassensis
- Beilschmiedia javanica
- Beilschmiedia kostermansiana
- Beilschmiedia lancifolia
- Beilschmiedia ledermannii
- Beilschmiedia longifolia
- Beilschmiedia macrocarpa
- Beilschmiedia macrophylla
- Beilschmiedia membranifolia
- Beilschmiedia montanoides
- Beilschmiedia ndongensis
- Beilschmiedia neoletestui
- Beilschmiedia osacola
- Beilschmiedia ovoidea
- Beilschmiedia papyracea
- Beilschmiedia pauciflora
- Beilschmiedia pellegrinii
- Beilschmiedia pubescens
- Beilschmiedia pullenii
- Beilschmiedia purpurea
- Beilschmiedia rosseliana
- Beilschmiedia rufolanata
- Beilschmiedia sericea
- Beilschmiedia shangsiensis
- Beilschmiedia sichourensis
- Beilschmiedia thollonii
- Beilschmiedia triplinervis
- Beilschmiedia turbinata
- Beilschmiedia vermoesenii
- Beilschmiedia vestita
- Beilschmiedia yangambiensis
- Beilschmiedia zahnii
- Cinnamomum auricolor
- Cinnamomum bhamoensis
- Cinnamomum bhaskarii
- Cinnamomum brachythyrsum
- Cinnamomum cambodianum
- Cinnamomum champokianum
- Cinnamomum chemungianum
- Cinnamomum cupulatum
- Cinnamomum englerianum
- Cinnamomum glauciphyllum
- Cinnamomum gracillimum
- Cinnamomum hkinlumense
- Cinnamomum kingdon-wardii
- Cinnamomum kotoense
- Cinnamomum lanaoense
- Cinnamomum loheri
- Cinnamomum lohitensis
- Cinnamomum longipedicellatum
- Cinnamomum oblongum
- Cinnamomum pachypes
- Cinnamomum paraneuron
- Cinnamomum perglabrum
- Cinnamomum petiolatum
- Cinnamomum rosselianum
- Cinnamomum rufotomentosum
- Cinnamomum sancti-caroli
- Cinnamomum sessilifolium
- Cinnamomum sumatranum
- Cinnamomum talawaense
- Cinnamomum travancoricum
- Cinnamomum trintaense
- Cinnamomum utile
- Cinnamomum walaiwarense
- Cryptocarya alseodaphnifolia
- Cryptocarya alticola
- Cryptocarya angica
- Cryptocarya archboldiana
- Cryptocarya arfakensis
- Cryptocarya atra
- Cryptocarya aurea
- Cryptocarya aureobrunnea
- Cryptocarya beilschmiediifolia
- Cryptocarya biswasii
- Cryptocarya boemiensis
- Cryptocarya burkillii
- Cryptocarya calderi
- Cryptocarya canaliculata
- Cryptocarya capuronii
- Cryptocarya carrii
- Cryptocarya caryoptera
- Cryptocarya cavei
- Cryptocarya ceramica
- Cryptocarya darusensis
- Cryptocarya depauperata
- Cryptocarya dipterocarpifolia
- Cryptocarya durifolia
- Cryptocarya elliptifolia
- Cryptocarya flavisperma
- Cryptocarya foxworthyi
- Cryptocarya glabriflora
- Cryptocarya globularia
- Cryptocarya gonioclada
- Cryptocarya graehneriana
- Cryptocarya impressivena
- Cryptocarya lancifolia
- Cryptocarya lancilimba
- Cryptocarya louvelii
- Cryptocarya macrophylla
- Cryptocarya medicinalis
- Cryptocarya megaphylla
- Cryptocarya montana
- Cryptocarya oahuensis
- Cryptocarya ocoteifolia
- Cryptocarya ovata
- Cryptocarya pachyphylla
- Cryptocarya pallida
- Cryptocarya pallidifolia
- Cryptocarya parvifolia
- Cryptocarya pergamentacea
- Cryptocarya pusilla
- Cryptocarya rarinervia
- Cryptocarya rhizophoretum
- Cryptocarya robynsiana
- Cryptocarya rotundifolia
- Cryptocarya rubra
- Cryptocarya ruruvaiensis
- Cryptocarya samoensis
- Cryptocarya schlechteri
- Cryptocarya sellowiana
- Cryptocarya sericeotriplinervia
- Cryptocarya sheikelmudiyana
- Cryptocarya simonsii
- Cryptocarya subtrinervis
- Cryptocarya sulavesiana
- Cryptocarya sumbawaensis
- Cryptocarya tebaensis
- Cryptocarya tesselata
- Cryptocarya tetragona
- Cryptocarya todayensis
- Cryptocarya vanderwerffii
- Cryptocarya velutina
- Cryptocarya whiteana
- Cryptocarya wiedensis
- Cryptocarya womersleyi
- Dehaasia acuminata
- Dehaasia assamica
- Dehaasia chatacea
- Dehaasia pugerensis
- Dehaasia rangamattiensis
- Dehaasia sumbaensis
- Dehaasia teijsmannii
- Dicypellium caryophyllaceum
- Dicypellium manausense
- Endiandra albiramea
- Endiandra archboldiana
- Endiandra arfakensis
- Endiandra asymmerrica
- Endiandra chartacea
- Endiandra djamuensis
- Endiandra faceta
- Endiandra ferruginea
- Endiandra havelii
- Endiandra macrostemon
- Endiandra minutiflora
- Endiandra multiflora
- Endiandra oviformis
- Endiandra scrobiculata
- Endiandra sphaerica
- Endiandra teschneriana
- Gamanthera herrerae
- Licaria exserta
- Licaria quirirafuina
- Licaria siphonantha
- Licaria tenuifolia
- Lindera laureola
- Litsea albicans
- Litsea alleniana
- Litsea anomala
- Litsea aureo-sericea
- Litsea banaensis
- Litsea buinensis
- Litsea burckelloides
- Litsea cangyuanensis
- Litsea catubigensiskos
- Litsea chrysoneura
- Litsea diospyrifolia
- Litsea globifera
- Litsea hornei
- Litsea ilocana
- Litsea machiloides
- Litsea mafuluensis
- Litsea mathuataensis
- Litsea mishmiensis
- Litsea morobensis
- Litsea papillosa
- Litsea perfulva
- Litsea perlucida
- Litsea racemiflora
- Litsea sessilifructa
- Litsea subauriculata
- Machilus bokorensis
- Machilus brevipaniculata
- Machilus champasakensis
- Machilus parviflora
- Machilus salicoides
- Mespilodaphne paradoxa
- Mezilaurus glabriantha
- Mezilaurus microphylla
- Mezilaurus thoroflora
- Nectandra apiculata
- Nectandra brochidodroma
- Nectandra caudatoacuminata
- Nectandra cerifolia
- Nectandra cordata
- Nectandra filiflora
- Nectandra pulchra
- Neocinnamomum huongsonensis
- Neolitsea archboldiana
- Neolitsea arfakensis
- Neolitsea incana
- Nothaphoebe annamensis
- Nothaphoebe falcata
- Ocotea acunana
- Ocotea amplifolia
- Ocotea bajapazensis
- Ocotea baracoensis
- Ocotea cantareirae
- Ocotea cristalensis
- Ocotea cuatrecasasii
- Ocotea duplocolorata
- Ocotea eriothyrsa
- Ocotea euvenosa
- Ocotea grandifructa
- Ocotea harrisii
- Ocotea heribertoi
- Ocotea hypoglauca
- Ocotea ikonyokpe, synonym of Kuloa ikonyokpe
- Ocotea iridescens
- Ocotea lancilimba
- Ocotea libanensis
- Ocotea macrantha
- Ocotea monteverdensis
- Ocotea oblongifolia
- Ocotea producta
- Ocotea racemiflora
- Ocotea rigidifolia
- Ocotea sperata
- Ocotea thinicola
- Ocotea truncata
- Ocotea tsaratananensis
- Persea chrysantha
- Persea obovata
- Phoebe birmanica
- Phoebe mathewsii
- Pleurothyrium amplifolium
- Pleurothyrium arcuatum
- Pleurothyrium bracteatum
- Potameia antevaratra
- Rhodostemonodaphne debilis
- Rhodostemonodaphne velutina
- Syndiclis lotungensis
- Williamodendron cinnamomeum
- Williamodendron quadrilocellatum

==== Monimiaceae ====
- Ephippiandra tsaratanensis
- Hortonia angustifolia
- Matthaea intermedia
- Mollinedia eugeniifolia
- Mollinedia gilgiana
- Mollinedia jorgeorum
- Mollinedia myriantha
- Steganthera hentyi
- Tambourissa cocottensis
- Tambourissa dorrii
- Tambourissa floricostata
- Tambourissa nosybensis
- Tambourissa pedicellata

=== Magnoliales ===
==== Annonaceae ====
Species

- Alphonsea annulata
- Alphonsea keithii
- Alphonsea kingii
- Annona ecuadorensis
- Annona ekmanii
- Annona ferruginea
- Annona frutescens
- Annona gracilis
- Annona hystricoides
- Annona longipes
- Annona moaensis
- Annona oblongifolia
- Annona salicifolia
- Brieya latipetala
- Cremastosperma brachypodum
- Cymbopetalum parviflorum
- Dasymaschalon borneense
- Desmopsis carrillensis
- Desmopsis duran
- Desmopsis flagelliflora
- Desmopsis guerrerensis
- Desmopsis mexicana
- Desmopsis migueliana
- Desmopsis monticola
- Desmopsis morenoi
- Desmopsis tuberculata
- Desmopsis tubiflora
- Desmopsis wendtii
- Desmopsis zoque
- Disepalum acuminatissimum
- Disepalum rawagambut
- Duguetia restingae
- Fissistigma tungfangense
- Goniothalamus alatus
- Goniothalamus copelandii
- Goniothalamus longistylus
- Goniothalamus mindorensis
- Goniothalamus nitidus
- Goniothalamus panayensis
- Goniothalamus sibuyanensis
- Goniothalamus suluensis
- Goniothalamus trunciflorus
- Guatteria attenuata
- Guatteria esperanzae
- Hornschuchia alba
- Huberantha capillata
- Huberantha mossambicensis
- Huberantha palawanensis
- Huberantha whistleri
- Isolona capuronii
- Klarobelia subglobosa
- Lukea quentinii
- Meiogyne insularis
- Meiogyne kanthanensis
- Mezzettia herveyana
- Mitrephora kostermansii
- Mitrephora sirikitiae
- Mitrephora sorsogonensis
- Mitrephora woodii
- Monanthotaxis couvreurii
- Monoon glabrum
- Monoon sublanceolatum
- Mosannona vasquezii
- Neo-uvaria viridifolia
- Orophea clemensiana
- Orophea sericea
- Orophea sichaikhanii
- Orophea yunnanensis
- Oxandra unibracteata
- Phaeanthus tephrocarpus
- Polyalthia gracilipes
- Polyalthia hirtifolia
- Polyalthia kinabaluensis
- Polyalthia lancilimba
- Polyalthiopsis floribunda
- Polyalthiopsis verrucipes
- Popowia lanceolata
- Pseudoxandra parvifolia
- Pseuduvaria gardneri
- Pseuduvaria taipingensis
- Sageraea reticulata
- Tridimeris huatuscoana
- Unonopsis bauxitae
- Unonopsis sanctae-teresae
- Uvaria decidua (possibly extinct)
- Uvaria diplocampta
- Uvaria manjensis
- Uvaria puguensis
- Uvaria rovumae
- Uvariodendron dzomboense
- Uvariopsis dicaprio
- Xylopia amplexicaulis
- Xylopia capuronii
- Xylopia degeneri
- Xylopia ghesquiereana
- Xylopia humbertii
- Xylopia lamarckii
- Xylopia obtusifolia

Subspecies and varieties

- Artabotrys modestus subsp. modestus
- Uvariodendron molundense var. citrata

==== Magnoliaceae ====
Species

- Magnolia arroyoana
- Magnolia banghamii
- Magnolia betuliensis
- Magnolia calimaensis
- Magnolia canandeana
- Magnolia cararensis
- Magnolia cespedesii
- Magnolia chiguila
- Magnolia chimantensis
- Magnolia clementinana
- Magnolia colombiana
- Magnolia coronata
- Magnolia domingensis
- Magnolia ekmanii
- Magnolia emarginata
- Magnolia espinalii
- Magnolia fansipanensis
- Magnolia faustinomirandae
- Magnolia granbarrancae
- Magnolia grandis
- Magnolia gustavii
- Magnolia jardinensis
- Magnolia kachinensis
- Magnolia katiorum
- Magnolia lacandonica
- Magnolia longipedunculata
- Magnolia manguillo
- Magnolia mayae
- Magnolia montebelloensis
- Magnolia narinensis
- Magnolia ofeliae
- Magnolia omeiensis
- Magnolia orbiculata
- Magnolia oscarrodrigoi
- Magnolia ottoi
- Magnolia ovoidea
- Magnolia pleiocarpa
- Magnolia polyhypsophylla
- Magnolia poqomchi
- Magnolia rabaniana
- Magnolia reynelii
- Magnolia sanchez-vegae
- Magnolia sinica
- Magnolia sonlaensis
- Magnolia talpana
- Magnolia tiepii
- Magnolia tribouillierana
- Magnolia vallartensis
- Magnolia veliziana
- Magnolia virolinensis
- Magnolia wendtii
- Magnolia wolfii (possibly extinct in the wild)
- Magnolia yajlachhi
- Magnolia zenii

Subspecies

- Magnolia cubensis subsp. acunae
- Magnolia virginiana subsp. oviedoae

==== Myristicaceae ====
- Horsfieldia iryaghedhi
- Horsfieldia samarensis
- Horsfieldia sepikensis
- Horsfieldia sessilifolia
- Knema ridsdaleana
- Knema uliginosa
- Mauloutchia annickiae
- Myristica basilanica
- Myristica brachypoda
- Myristica brevistipes
- Myristica coacta
- Myristica colinridsdalei
- Myristica pilosigemma
- Myristica robusta
- Myristica simulans
- Myristica sogeriensis
- Myristica wenzelii
- Myristica yunnanensis

=== Malpighiales ===
==== Calophyllaceae ====
- Calophyllum acutiputamen
- Calophyllum africanum
- Calophyllum bifurcatum
- Calophyllum calcicola
- Calophyllum cuneifolium
- Calophyllum macrophyllum
- Calophyllum oliganthum
- Calophyllum parkeri
- Calophyllum pascalianum
- Calophyllum piluliferum
- Calophyllum poilanei
- Calophyllum rigidulum
- Calophyllum utile
- Calophyllum vanoverberghii
- Kayea manii
- Kayea stylosa
- Kielmeyera decipiens
- Kielmeyera ferruginosa
- Kielmeyera peruviana
- Kielmeyera rupestris
- Kielmeyera sigillata
- Marila biflora
- Marila dissitiflora
- Marila spiciformis
- Poeciloneuron pauciflorum

==== Chrysobalanaceae ====
- Atuna travancorica
- Couepia carautae
- Couepia coarctata
- Couepia hondurasensis
- Couepia joaquinae
- Couepia meridionalis
- Couepia osaensis
- Dactyladenia dichotoma
- Dactyladenia eketensis
- Dactyladenia johnstonei
- Dactyladenia pierrei
- Dactyladenia sapinii
- Hirtella aramangensis
- Hirtella beckii
- Hirtella conduplicata
- Hirtella trichotoma
- Hunga longifolia
- Leptobalanus diegogomezii
- Licania cuyabenensis
- Licania microphylla
- Magnistipula devriesii
- Magnistipula multinervia
- Moquilea espinae
- Moquilea guatemalensis
- Moquilea hedbergii
- Moquilea tachirensis
- Parinari argenteosericea

==== Clusiaceae ====
- Chrysochlamys pavonii
- Clusia cajamarcensis
- Clusia caryophylloides
- Clusia diguensis
- Clusia intertexta
- Clusia lehmannii
- Clusia lunanthera
- Clusia mayana
- Clusia nervosa
- Clusia plurivalvis
- Clusia rubescens
- Clusia skotaster
- Clusia tequendamae
- Clusia uniflora
- Garcinia bifasciculata
- Garcinia busuangaensis
- Garcinia cadelliana
- Garcinia capuronii
- Garcinia cincta
- Garcinia cordata
- Garcinia gamblei
- Garcinia heterophylla
- Garcinia imbertii
- Garcinia klabang
- Garcinia linearifolia
- Garcinia loheri
- Garcinia multibracteolata
- Garcinia multifida
- Garcinia pacifica
- Garcinia polyneura
- Garcinia pulvinata
- Garcinia ramosii
- Garcinia samarensis
- Garcinia sangudsangud
- Garcinia serpentini
- Garcinia tanzaniensis
- Garcinia tanzaniensis
- Garcinia travancorica
- Garcinia xylosperma
- Thysanostemon fanshawei
- Tovomita aequatoriensis
- Tovomita megantha

==== Euphorbiaceae ====
Species

- Acalypha ecuadorica
- Acalypha eggersii
- Acalypha raivavensis
- Agrostistachys hookeri
- Aristogeitonia gabonica
- Baloghia pulchella
- Claoxylon linostachys
- Cleidion lemurum
- Croton lawianus
- Croton macrocarpus
- Croton vaughanii
- Crotonogyne impedita
- Ditaxis macrantha
- Drypetes riseleyi
- Drypetes tessmanniana
- Euphorbia ankazobensis
- Euphorbia berorohae
- Euphorbia boinensis (possibly extinct)
- Euphorbia capmanambatoensis
- Euphorbia cap-saintemariensis
- Euphorbia deppeana
- Euphorbia eleanoriae
- Euphorbia francoisii
- Euphorbia geroldii
- Euphorbia halemanui
- Euphorbia heleniana, French grass
- Euphorbia herbstii
- Euphorbia iharanae
- Euphorbia kondoi
- Euphorbia labatii
- Euphorbia margalidiana
- Euphorbia millotii
- Euphorbia neospinescens (possibly extinct)
- Euphorbia origanoides, Ascension spurge
- Euphorbia pachypodioides
- Euphorbia parvicyathophora
- Euphorbia pirahazo (possibly extinct)
- Euphorbia quitensis
- Euphorbia razafindratsirae
- Euphorbia remyi
- Euphorbia robivelonae
- Euphorbia rockii
- Euphorbia stygiana
- Euphorbia tanaensis
- Euphorbia tulearensis
- Koilodepas ferrugineum
- Macaranga raivavaeensis
- Ostodes minor, synonym of Paracroton zeylanicus
- Paranecepsia andrafiabensis
- Podadenia thwaitesii
- Pseudoglochidion anamalayanum
- Sauropus assimilis
- Sauropus elegantissimus
- Sebastiania crenulata
- Sebastiania howardiana
- Tetrorchidium microphyllum
- Trigonostemon cherrieri
- Victorinia regina, synonym of Cnidoscolus regina

Subspecies

- Euphorbia cylindrifolia subsp. tuberifera
- Euphorbia stenoclada subsp. ambatofinandranae

Varieties

- Drypetes usambarica var. rugulosa
- Euphorbia decaryi var. robinsonii
- Euphorbia francoisii var. francoisii
- Euphorbia greenwayi var. greenwayi
- Euphorbia lophogona var. tenuicaulis
- Euphorbia remyi var. kauaiensis
- Euphorbia remyi var. remyi
- Sebastiania lesteri var. glabrata
- Sebastiania lesteri var. lesteri

==== Hypericaceae ====
- Hypericum fissurale, cracked Saint John's wort
- Hypericum hartwegii

==== Linaceae ====
- Linum cratericola, Floreana flax

==== Ochnaceae ====
- Medusagyne oppositifolia, jellyfish tree
- Ochna rufescens
- Ouratea elegans

==== Peraceae ====
- Chaetocarpus pubescens

==== Phyllanthaceae ====
Species

- Amanoa anomala
- Aporosa fusiformis
- Cleistanthus major
- Cleistanthus robustus
- Flueggea elliptica
- Flueggea neowawraea
- Glochidion butonicum
- Glochidion cagayanense
- Glochidion cenabrei
- Glochidion chodoense
- Glochidion comitum
- Glochidion conostylum
- Glochidion daviesii
- Glochidion drypetifolium
- Glochidion euryoides
- Glochidion kopiaginis
- Glochidion lalae
- Glochidion melvilleorum
- Glochidion plagiophyllum
- Glochidion pulgarense
- Glochidion santisukii
- Glochidion trichophorum
- Glochidion wonenggau
- Hieronyma crassistipula
- Phyllanthus aoraiensis
- Phyllanthus artensis
- Phyllanthus aspersus
- Phyllanthus bemangidiensis
- Phyllanthus borenensis
- Phyllanthus burundiensis
- Phyllanthus caesiifolius
- Phyllanthus coodei
- Phyllanthus denticulatus
- Phyllanthus felicis
- Phyllanthus fractiflexus
- Phyllanthus gordonii
- Phyllanthus jaffrei
- Phyllanthus kidna
- Phyllanthus kouaouaensis
- Phyllanthus luciliae
- Phyllanthus mandjeliaensis
- Phyllanthus millei
- Phyllanthus mimicus
- Phyllanthus nyale
- Phyllanthus pindaiensis
- Phyllanthus poliborealis
- Phyllanthus revaughanii
- Phyllanthus rhizomatosus
- Phyllanthus rozennae
- Phyllanthus schliebenii
- Phyllanthus tritepalus
- Phyllanthus tsetserrae
- Phyllanthus umbratus
- Phyllanthus unioensis
- Phyllanthus veillonii
- Phyllanthus virgultiramus

Varieties

- Phyllanthus aeneus var. papillosus

==== Other Malpighiales ====
- Bonnetia ptariensis
- Bruguiera hainesii
- Cassipourea eketensis
- Cassipourea subcordata
- Cassipourea subsessilis
- Rafflesia magnifica, synonym of Rafflesia mira
- Salix tarraconensis

=== Malvales ===
==== Dipterocarpaceae ====
Species

- Balanocarpus kitulgallensis
- Cotylelobium lewisianum
- Dipterocarpus bourdillonii
- Dipterocarpus cinereus
- Dipterocarpus coriaceus
- Dipterocarpus cuspidatus
- Dipterocarpus hispidus
- Dipterocarpus lamellatus
- Dipterocarpus pseudocornutus
- Dryobalanops fusca
- Hopea auriculata
- Hopea bancana
- Hopea basilanica
- Hopea bilitonensis
- Hopea brachyptera
- Hopea cordata
- Hopea depressinerva
- Hopea erosa
- Hopea inexpectata
- Hopea jacobi
- Hopea jucunda
- Hopea macrocarpa
- Hopea micrantha
- Hopea obscurinerva
- Hopea reynosoi
- Hopea rudiformis
- Hopea santosiana
- Hopea scabra
- Parashorea globosa
- Parashorea warburgii
- Shorea dispar, synonym of Rubroshorea dispar
- Shorea falcata
- Shorea foraminifera, synonym of Rubroshorea foraminifera
- Shorea iliasii, synonym of Richetia iliasii
- Shorea induplicata, synonym of Richetia induplicata
- Shorea kuantanensis, synonym of Richetia kuantanensis
- Shorea leptoderma
- Shorea lumutensis
- Shorea macrantha, synonym of Rubroshorea macrantha
- Shorea montigena, synonym of Anthoshorea montigena
- Shorea ovalifolia, synonym of Doona ovalifolia
- Shorea praestans, synonym of Rubroshorea praestans
- Shorea revoluta, synonym of Rubroshorea revoluta
- Shorea rotundifolia, synonym of Rubroshorea rotundifolia
- Shorea teysmanniana, synonym of Rubroshorea teysmanniana
- Stemonoporus affinis
- Stemonoporus bullatus
- Stemonoporus gilimalensis
- Stemonoporus gracilis
- Stemonoporus laevifolius
- Stemonoporus lanceolatus
- Stemonoporus latisepalus
- Stemonoporus marginalis
- Stemonoporus moonii
- Stemonoporus nitidus
- Stemonoporus scaphifolius
- Vateria macrocarpa
- Vateriopsis seychellarum
- Vatica adenanii
- Vatica bantamensis
- Vatica cauliflora
- Vatica elliptica
- Vatica flavida
- Vatica kanthanensis
- Vatica mendozae
- Vatica patentinervia
- Vatica pentandra
- Vatica soepadmoi
- Vatica venulosa
- Vatica yeechongii

Subspecies

- Anisoptera thurifera subsp. thurifera
- Dipterocarpus caudatus subsp. caudatus
- Dipterocarpus conformis subsp. conformis
- Hopea andersonii subsp. basalticola
- Hopea jucunda subsp. jucunda
- Hopea jucunda subsp. modesta
- Shorea assamica subsp. assamica
- Shorea assamica subsp. globifera
- Shorea assamica subsp. koordersii
- Shorea assamica subsp. philippinensis
- Shorea falciferoides subsp. falciferoides
- Shorea falciferoides subsp. glaucescens
- Shorea hemsleyana subsp. grandiflora
- Shorea hemsleyana subsp. hemsleyana
- Shorea macroptera subsp. macroptera
- Shorea macroptera subsp. sandakanensis
- Shorea ovalis subsp. sarawakensis
- Shorea ovalis subsp. sericea
- Shorea singkawang subsp. scabrosa
- Vatica javanica subsp. javanica
- Vatica javanica subsp. scaphifolia
- Vatica oblongifolia subsp. crassilobata
- Vatica oblongifolia subsp. elliptifolia

==== Malvaceae ====
Species

- Abutilon eremitopetalum, hidden-petaled abutilon
- Abutilon menziesii
- Abutilon sachetianum
- Abutilon sandwicense, greenflower Indian mallow
- Abutilon whistleri
- Adansonia perrieri
- Byttneria minytricha
- Carpodiptera mirabilis
- Cola cecidiifolia
- Cola metallica
- Cola nigerica
- Cola praeacuta
- Craigia kwangsiensis
- Dicellostyles axillaris
- Dombeya ledermannii
- Hampea breedlovei
- Hibiscadelphus distans
- Hibiscadelphus giffardianus
- Hibiscadelphus hualalaiensis
- Hibiscus clayi, Clay's hibiscus
- Hibiscus fragilis
- Kokia drynarioides, Hawaiian tree cotton
- Kokia kauaiensis, Kauai koki'o
- Quararibea aurantiocalyx
- Pterospermum kingtungense
- Pterospermum menglunense
- Pterospermum yunnanense
- Reevesia rotundifolia
- Trochetiopsis ebenus, dwarf ebony
- Wercklea flavovirens

Subspecies

- Hibiscus waimeae subsp. hannerae

Varieties

- Bombax insigne var. polystemon

==== Thymelaeaceae ====
- Aquilaria crassna
- Aquilaria rostrata
- Daphnopsis occulta
- Wikstroemia villosa, Hairy wikstroemia

==== Other Malvales species ====
Species

- Elaeocarpus bojeri
- Elaeocarpus gaussenii
- Elaeocarpus integrifolius
- Leptolaena masoalensis
- Pentachlaena betamponensis
- Perrierodendron quartzitorum
- Sarcolaena humbertiana
- Sarcolaena isaloensis
- Schizolaena raymondii
- Schizolaena tampoketsana
- Sloanea shankii

Subspecies

- Elaeocarpus submonoceras subsp. oliganthus

=== Myrtales ===
There are 97 species and five varieties in the order Myrtales assessed as critically endangered.

==== Combretaceae ====
Species

- Combretum tenuipetiolatum

Varieties

- Terminalia eriostachya var. margaretiae, black mastic
- Terminalia glabrata var. glabrata
- Terminalia glabrata var. koariki

==== Lythraceae ====
- Rotala malabarica
- Rotala robynsiana
- Sonneratia griffithii
- Sonneratia hainanensis, Hainan sonneratia
- Tetrataxis salicifolia

==== Melastomataceae ====
- Adelobotrys panamensis
- Astronidium floribundum
- Astronidium inflatum
- Astronidium kasiense
- Astronidium lepidotum
- Astronidium pallidiflorum
- Astronidium saulae
- Blakea granatensis
- Clidemia ecuadorensis
- Henriettea granularis
- Henriettea membranifolia
- Lijndenia brenanii (possibly extinct)
- Memecylon arnottianum
- Memecylon bakossiense
- Memecylon buxoides
- Memecylon elegantulum
- Memecylon gardneri
- Memecylon myrtiforme
- Memecylon orbiculare
- Memecylon rhinophyllum
- Memecylon sisparense
- Meriania versicolor
- Miconia benoistii
- Miconia leandroides
- Miconia littlei
- Miconia longisetosa (possibly extinct)
- Miconia scabra (possibly extinct)
- Tessmannianthus carinatus
- Warneckea cordiformis
- Warneckea ngutiensis

==== Myrtaceae ====
Species

- Calycolpus aequatorialis
- Calycorectes dominicanus
- Calycorectes schottianus, synonym of Eugenia leonorae
- Calycorectes wurdackii, synonym of Eugenia wurdackii
- Campomanesia blanchetiana
- Campomanesia sepalifolia
- Chamguava musarum
- Eucalyptopsis alauda
- Eucalyptus beardiana
- Eucalyptus carolaniae
- Eucalyptus crenulata
- Eucalyptus dalveenica
- Eucalyptus dolorosa
- Eucalyptus filiformis
- Eucalyptus foliosa
- Eucalyptus imlayensis
- Eucalyptus impensa
- Eucalyptus morrisbyi
- Eucalyptus ornans
- Eucalyptus orophila
- Eucalyptus purpurata
- Eucalyptus recurva, Mongarlowe mallee
- Eucalyptus silvestris
- Eucalyptus walshii
- Eucalyptus yarriambiack
- Eugenia aboukirensis
- Eugenia acunae
- Eugenia amorimii
- Eugenia argentea
- Eugenia arianae
- Eugenia ayitiensis
- Eugenia bajaverapazana
- Eugenia balancanensis
- Eugenia barrana
- Eugenia bayatensis
- Eugenia binata
- Eugenia bojeri
- Eugenia borhidiana
- Eugenia brachyblastiflora
- Eugenia buchholzii
- Eugenia cajalbanica
- Eugenia calciscopulorum
- Eugenia camptophylla
- Eugenia canapuensis
- Eugenia cerrocacaoensis
- Eugenia churutensis
- Eugenia cinerascens
- Eugenia circumdata
- Eugenia cocosensis
- Eugenia coyolensis
- Eugenia crassipetala
- Eugenia crispula
- Eugenia culicina
- Eugenia discors
- Eugenia essequiboensis
- Eugenia flavicarpa
- Eugenia gageana
- Eugenia galeata
- Eugenia gastropogena
- Eugenia gilgii
- Eugenia guayaquilensis (possibly extinct)
- Eugenia hanoverensis
- Eugenia hastilis
- Eugenia hermesiana
- Eugenia hexovulata
- Eugenia holdridgei
- Eugenia ilalensis
- Eugenia inaequisepala
- Eugenia inconspicua
- Eugenia insignis
- Eugenia ischnosceles
- Eugenia jeremiensis
- Eugenia kamelii
- Eugenia kameruniana
- Eugenia kellyana
- Eugenia klossii
- Eugenia koolauensis
- Eugenia krukoffiana
- Eugenia lancetillae
- Eugenia letreroana
- Eugenia leucadendron
- Eugenia magoana
- Eugenia mandonii
- Eugenia manickamiana
- Eugenia matudae
- Eugenia micranthoides
- Eugenia minguetii
- Eugenia molinae
- Eugenia mollicoma
- Eugenia montalbanica
- Eugenia morii
- Eugenia mozomboensis
- Eugenia muscicola
- Eugenia nematopoda
- Eugenia papalensis
- Eugenia pasacaensis
- Eugenia pascaliana
- Eugenia peruibensis
- Eugenia petrophila
- Eugenia pithecocephala
- Eugenia plurinervia
- Eugenia polypora
- Eugenia racemiflora
- Eugenia ramonae
- Eugenia razakamalalae
- Eugenia rendlei
- Eugenia rheophytica
- Eugenia rodriguesensis
- Eugenia rugosissima
- Eugenia ruschiana
- Eugenia scalarinervis
- Eugenia scheffleri (possibly extinct)
- Eugenia sessilifolia
- Eugenia sihanakensis
- Eugenia sp. 'lepredourii'
- Eugenia stibephylla
- Eugenia stictophylla
- Eugenia tapirorum
- Eugenia teresa-ruiziana
- Eugenia theodorae
- Eugenia toaensis
- Eugenia tumescens
- Eugenia ulei
- Eugenia uminganensis
- Eugenia ursina
- Eugenia vanwykiana
- Eugenia vatomandrensis
- Eugenia vattimoana
- Eugenia vaughanii
- Eugenia verapazensis
- Eugenia wynadensis
- Eugenia zelayensis
- Gossia ngaensis
- Kania microphylla
- Lophomyrtus bullata
- Metrosideros arfakensis
- Metrosideros bartlettii, Bartlett's rātā
- Metrosideros cherrieri
- Metrosideros ochrantha
- Metrosideros ovata
- Metrosideros polymorpha var. pseudorugosa
- Metrosideros rotundifolia
- Metrosideros whitakeri
- Mosiera crenulata
- Mosiera tiburona
- Myrceugenia bananalensis
- Myrcia abbotiana
- Myrcia acunae
- Myrcia acutissima
- Myrcia adulterina
- Myrcia adunca
- Myrcia anguerana
- Myrcia arachnicola
- Myrcia arenicola
- Myrcia ascendens
- Myrcia asperorum
- Myrcia boanova
- Myrcia carangola
- Myrcia carassana
- Myrcia castanea
- Myrcia clavija
- Myrcia colpodes
- Myrcia compta
- Myrcia curta
- Myrcia divisoria
- Myrcia estoraquensis
- Myrcia exapata
- Myrcia extranea
- Myrcia flavoviridis
- Myrcia gaudichaudiana
- Myrcia gilsoniana
- Myrcia hernandezii
- Myrcia hypericoides
- Myrcia johnstonii
- Myrcia longiramea
- Myrcia macrantha
- Myrcia margarettae
- Myrcia megaphylla
- Myrcia meridensis
- Myrcia monoclada
- Myrcia morroqueimadensis
- Myrcia mucugensis
- Myrcia neoestrellensis
- Myrcia neohotteana
- Myrcia neokiaerskovii
- Myrcia occulta
- Myrcia ovina
- Myrcia petrophila
- Myrcia pineticola
- Myrcia polyneura
- Myrcia portoricensis
- Myrcia pozasiana
- Myrcia proctorii
- Myrcia pseudosplendens
- Myrcia pudica
- Myrcia revoluta
- Myrcia rugosior
- Myrcia salamensis
- Myrcia salticola
- Myrcia santalucia
- Myrcia santateresana
- Myrcia schottii
- Myrcia siberiensis
- Myrcia solitaria
- Myrcia speciosa
- Myrcia teimosa
- Myrcia tetraptera
- Myrcia toaensis
- Myrcia zanquinensis
- Myrcianthes esnardiana
- Myrcianthes ferreyrae
- Myrcianthes lanosa
- Myrciaria leucadendron, synonym of Myrciaria floribunda
- Myrciaria rupestris
- Myrrhinium atropurpureum var. atropurpureum
- Nothomyrcia fernandeziana
- Octamyrtus halmaherensis
- Pimenta ferruginea
- Pimenta paganii
- Pimenta podocarpoides
- Plinia arenicola
- Plinia cidrensis
- Plinia costaricensis
- Plinia dermatodes
- Plinia ekmaniana
- Plinia longa
- Plinia longiacuminata
- Plinia rogersiana
- Psidium acunae
- Psidium calyptranthoides
- Psidium claraense, synonym of Psidium oligospermum
- Psidium hotteanum
- Psidium tenuirame
- Psidium trilobum
- Rhodamnia kamialiensis
- Rhodomyrtus kaweaensis
- Rhodomyrtus takeuchii
- Siphoneugena glabrata
- Syzygium abulugense
- Syzygium aegiceroides
- Syzygium agastyamalayanum
- Syzygium albayense
- Syzygium ampliflorum
- Syzygium andamanicum
- Syzygium angulare
- Syzygium anomalum
- Syzygium antonianum
- Syzygium apoense
- Syzygium badescens
- Syzygium balerense
- Syzygium bengkulense
- Syzygium bernardoi
- Syzygium brachyurum
- Syzygium brevipaniculatum
- Syzygium capoasense
- Syzygium cardiophyllum
- Syzygium carrii
- Syzygium cavitense
- Syzygium consanguineum
- Syzygium corticopapyraceum
- Syzygium courtallense
- Syzygium crassilimbum
- Syzygium crypteronioides
- Syzygium cyclophyllum, synonym of Syzygium revolutum subsp. cyclophyllum
- Syzygium davaoense
- Syzygium dempoense
- Syzygium diffusiflorum
- Syzygium ebaloii
- Syzygium elliptifolium
- Syzygium eugeniiforme
- Syzygium fenicis
- Syzygium filiflorum
- Syzygium filipes
- Syzygium fischeri
- Syzygium gjellerupii
- Syzygium grevesianum
- Syzygium guehoi
- Syzygium horsfieldii
- Syzygium hutchinsonii
- Syzygium ilocanum
- Syzygium iwahigense
- Syzygium kerrii
- Syzygium khaoyaiense
- Syzygium khasianum
- Syzygium khoonmengianum
- Syzygium koumacense
- Syzygium kudatense
- Syzygium labatii
- Syzygium lakshnakarae
- Syzygium lamii
- Syzygium lancilimbum
- Syzygium laxeracemosum
- Syzygium leptophlebium
- Syzygium luteum
- Syzygium maire
- Syzygium malagsam
- Syzygium martelinoi
- Syzygium minutiflorum
- Syzygium mirandae
- Syzygium multinerve
- Syzygium multipuncticulatum
- Syzygium neurophyllum
- Syzygium normanbiensc
- Syzygium novoguineense
- Syzygium obliquinervium
- Syzygium ovalifolium
- Syzygium pachyrrachis
- Syzygium palghatense
- Syzygium panayense
- Syzygium parvicarpum
- Syzygium pascasioii
- Syzygium patens
- Syzygium penasii
- Syzygium pendulinum
- Syzygium periyarense
- Syzygium phyllyraeoides, synonym of Eugenia phillyraeoides
- Syzygium polisense
- Syzygium ponmudianum
- Syzygium pseudocalcicola
- Syzygium pulgarense
- Syzygium rambutyense
- Syzygium recurvovenosum
- Syzygium rizalense
- Syzygium robustum
- Syzygium rolfei
- Syzygium roseum
- Syzygium rumphii
- Syzygium salpinganthum
- Syzygium sasidharanii
- Syzygium sessililimbum
- Syzygium siderocola
- Syzygium speciosissimum
- Syzygium squamiferum
- Syzygium stipitatum
- Syzygium subamplexicaule
- Syzygium sulitii
- Syzygium tapiaka
- Syzygium tchambaense
- Syzygium teretiflorum
- Syzygium trichotomum
- Syzygium trukense
- Syzygium umbilicatum
- Syzygium uniflorum
- Syzygium vernonioides
- Syzygium vrieseanum
- Syzygium vulcanicum
- Syzygium watutense
- Syzygium winckelii
- Tristaniopsis jaffrei
- Tristaniopsis minutiflora
- Tristaniopsis ninndoensis
- Tristaniopsis parvifolia
- Tristaniopsis polyandra
- Xanthomyrtus oreophila
- Xanthomyrtus splendens
- Xanthostemon glaucus

Varieties

- Eugenia harrisii var. grandifolia
- Myrrhinium atropurpureum var. atropurpureum

==== Onagraceae ====
- Epilobium numidicum

==== Trapaceae ====
- Trapa colchica, Colchis water-chestnut

==== Vochysiaceae ====
- Qualea impexa

=== Nymphaeales ===
- Nymphaea thermarum

=== Oxalidales ===
==== Cunoniaceae ====
- Ackama nubicola
- Codia xerophila
- Geissois belema
- Pancheria minima
- Pancheria ouaiemensis
- Pterophylla henricorum
- Pterophylla marojejyensis
- Weinmannia ouaiemensis, synonym of Pterophylla ouaiemensis
- Weinmannia tinctoria
- Weinmannia ysabelensis, synonym of Pterophylla ysabelensis

==== Oxalidaceae ====
- Oxalis natans
- Oxalis norlindiana
- Oxalis uliginosa

=== Piperales ===
==== Piperaceae ====
Species

- Peperomia albovittata
- Peperomia cordilimba
- Peperomia dauleana (possibly extinct)
- Peperomia glandulosa
- Peperomia guayaquilensis
- Peperomia leucorrhachis
- Peperomia litana
- Peperomia micromerioides
- Peperomia mitchelioides
- Peperomia parvilimba
- Peperomia peploides
- Peperomia petraea (possibly extinct)
- Peperomia pichinchae
- Peperomia pululaguana
- Peperomia stenostachya
- Peperomia tablahuasiana
- Piper angamarcanum
- Piper baezanum
- Piper bullatifolium
- Piper clathratum
- Piper entradense
- Piper eustylum
- Piper gualeanum
- Piper guayasanum
- Piper hydrolapathum
- Piper manabinum
- Piper mexiae
- Piper molliusculum (possibly extinct)
- Piper platylobum
- Piper poscitum
- Piper stipulosum
- Piper subnitidifolium
- Piper trachyphyllum
- Piper wibomii

Varieties

- Piper amalago var. variifolium

=== Plumbaginales ===
- Armeria berlengensis
- Armeria helodes
- Limonium calabrum
- Limonium dendroides
- Limonium sibthorpianum
- Limonium spectabile
- Limonium sventenii

=== Podostemales ===
- Apinagia peruviana
- Devillea flagelliformis (possibly extinct)
- Dicraeanthus zehnderi
- Ledermanniella batangensis
- Ledermanniella keayi
- Ledermanniella sanagaensis
- Saxicolella marginalis
- Terniopsis ubonensis
- Winklerella dichotoma
- Zehnderia microgyna

=== Proteales ===
==== Proteaceae ====
- Adenanthos detmoldii
- Adenanthos dobagii
- Banksia anatona
- Banksia aurantia
- Banksia brownii
- Banksia cuneata
- Banksia fuscobractea
- Banksia montana
- Banksia prionophylla
- Banksia rosserae
- Banksia verticillata
- Banksia vincentia
- Beauprea penariensis
- Diastella buekii
- Diastella parilis
- Eidothea hardeniana
- Faurea lucida
- Grevillea angustiloba
- Grevillea asparagoides
- Grevillea asteriscosa
- Grevillea caleyi
- Grevillea calliantha
- Grevillea curviloba
- Grevillea divaricata (possibly extinct)
- Grevillea eriobotrya
- Grevillea fuscolutea
- Grevillea humifusa
- Grevillea iaspicula
- Grevillea incurva
- Grevillea involucrata
- Grevillea lullfitzii
- Grevillea maccutcheonii
- Grevillea marriottii
- Grevillea maxwellii
- Grevillea obtusifolia
- Grevillea pinifolia
- Grevillea pythara
- Grevillea rara
- Grevillea rosieri
- Grevillea scapigera
- Grevillea scortechinii
- Grevillea squiresiae
- Grevillea tenuiloba
- Grevillea wilkinsonii
- Hakea aenigma
- Hakea ilicifolia
- Hakea pulvinifera
- Helicia peekelii
- Helicia peltata
- Helicia retusa
- Hollandaea porphyrocarpa
- Isopogon fletcheri
- Isopogon robustus
- Isopogon uncinatus
- Lambertia fairallii
- Leucadendron bonum
- Leucadendron chamelaea
- Leucadendron flexuosum
- Leucadendron globosum
- Leucadendron immoderatum
- Leucadendron levisanus
- Leucadendron macowanii
- Leucadendron tradouwense
- Leucadendron verticillatum
- Leucospermum arenarium
- Leucospermum fulgens
- Leucospermum harpagonatum
- Mimetes stokoei
- Panopsis hernandezii
- Panopsis magnifructa
- Persoonia acerosa
- Persoonia arborea
- Persoonia bargoensis
- Persoonia brevirhachis
- Persoonia flexifolia
- Persoonia micranthera
- Persoonia pauciflora
- Persoonia pungens
- Persoonia rufiflora
- Persoonia saccata
- Persoonia striata
- Persoonia stricta
- Persoonia trinervis
- Protea holosericea
- Protea inopina
- Protea namaquana
- Protea nubigena
- Protea odorata
- Roupala tobagensis
- Serruria aemula
- Serruria flava
- Serruria florida
- Serruria furcellata
- Serruria lacunosa
- Serruria pinnata
- Serruria scoparia
- Serruria trilopha
- Sorocephalus crassifolius
- Sorocephalus imbricatus
- Sorocephalus palustris
- Sorocephalus scabridus
- Synaphea nexosa
- Synaphea odocoileops
- Synaphea quartzitica
- Synaphea stenoloba

===== Sabiaceae =====
- Meliosma caucana
- Meliosma lindae
- Meliosma nanarum
- Meliosma nesites
- Meliosma seleriana

=== Ranunculales ===
Species

- Aconitum chasmanthum
- Anemone maxima
- Aquilegia barbaricina, Barbaricina colombine
- Aquilegia nuragica, Nuragica columbine
- Berberis karkaralensis
- Berberis nilghiriensis
- Callianthemum kernerianum
- Consolida samia
- Delphinium caseyi, Casey's larkspur
- Delphinium iris, Larkspur
- Delphinium munzianum, Larskpur
- Odontocarya perforata
- Ranunculus aragazi, Aragatsian buttercup
- Ranunculus tempskyanus, Buttercup
- Ranunculus vermirrhizus, Worm-rooted buttercup
- Triclisia macrophylla

Varieties

- Cissampelos nigrescens var. cardiophylla

=== Rosales ===
==== Moraceae ====
- Antiaropsis uniflora
- Artocarpus annulatus
- Artocarpus nanchuanensis
- Calaunia negrosensis
- Dorstenia arachniformis
- Dorstenia bicaudata (possibly extinct)
- Ficus angladei
- Ficus archeri
- Ficus boanensis
- Ficus chaparensis
- Ficus hypogaea
- Ficus jaheriana
- Ficus jaramilloi
- Ficus lateriflora
- Ficus latipedunculata
- Ficus limosa
- Ficus myiopotamica
- Ficus novahibernica
- Ficus pleyteana
- Ficus pubipetiola
- Ficus samarana
- Ficus sclerosycia
- Ficus tristaniifolia
- Ficus umbonata
- Metatrophis margaretae
- Perebea glabrifolia
- Pseudolmedia manabiensis
- Sorocea longipedicellata
- Trilepisium gymnandrum

==== Rhamnaceae ====
- Auerodendron pauciflorum
- Colubrina oppositifolia
- Doerpfeldia cubensis
- Gouania hillebrandii
- Gouania meyenii
- Gouania ulugurica
- Gouania vitifolia, Oahu chewstick
- Phylica polifolia, St Helena rosemary
- Pseudoziziphus celata
- Reynosia jamaicensis
- Reynosia vivesiana
- Rhamnus lojaconoi
- Rhamnus mildbraedii
- Rhamnus taquetii
- Sarcomphalus parvifolius

==== Rosaceae ====
Species

- Bencomia brachystachya
- Bencomia sphaerocarpa
- Cercocarpus traskiae, Catalina mahogany
- Crataegus darvasica
- Crataegus harbisonii
- Crataegus knorringiana
- Crataegus necopinata
- Crataegus turcicus, Turkish hawthorn
- Pentactina rupicola
- Potentilla seidlitziana, Zeidlits' five-fingers
- Prunus ernestii
- Pyrus browiczii, Brovich's pear
- Pyrus gergerana, Gergeranian pear
- Pyrus korshinskyi
- Pyrus magyarica
- Pyrus tadshikistanica
- Pyrus voronovii, Voronov's pear
- Rosa dolichocarpa, Long-fruited brier
- Rubus takhtadjanii, Takhtadjan's blackberry
- Sibiraea tianschanica
- Sorbus arvonensis, synonym of Aria arvonicola
- Sorbus decipiens
- Sorbus leptophylla, Thin-leaved whitebeam
- Sorbus leyana, Ley's whitebeam
- Sorbus maderensis
- Sorbus parumlobata
- Sorbus wilmottiana, Wilmott's whitebeam

Subspecies

- Alchemilla fischeri subsp. camerunensis
- Polylepis tomentella subsp. nana

==== Other Rosales species ====
Species

- Aichryson dumosum
- Byblis gigantea
- Connarus ecuadorensis
- Connarus popenoei
- Debregeasia ceylanica
- Maillardia pendula, synonym of Maillardia montana
- Monanthes wildpretii
- Neraudia angulata
- Neraudia kauaiensis
- Neraudia ovata, Big Island ma'oloa
- Neraudia sericea
- Perebea glabrifolia
- Pilea cataractae
- Pilea laevicaulis
- Pilea pollicaris
- Pilea selbyanorum
- Sedum euxinum, Euxinian stonecrop
- Ulmus gaussenii
- Urera kaalae
- Weinmannia exigua
- Weinmannia tinctoria
- Zelkova sicula

Varieties

- Geissois ternata var. serrata
- Neraudia angulata var. angulata
- Neraudia angulata var. dentata

=== Santalales ===
Species

- Agelanthus rondensis (possibly extinct)
- Dendropemon caymanensis
- Exocarpos luteolus
- Kunkeliella psilotoclada (possibly extinct)
- Kunkeliella subsucculenta
- Olax psittacorum
- Phoradendron aequatoris
- Taxillus wiensii

Varieties

- Santalum insulare var. margaretae
- Santalum insulare var. raivavense

=== Sapindales ===
==== Aceraceae ====
Species

- Acer hainanense
- Acer leipoense

Varieties

- Acer buergerianum var. formosanum, Taiwan trident maple
- Acer oblongum var. membranaceum

==== Anacardiaceae ====
- Buchanania barberi
- Campnosperma seychellarum
- Comocladia parvifoliola
- Dracontomelon macrocarpum
- Mangifera campnospermoides
- Melanochyla fasciculiflora
- Melanochyla woodiana
- Micronychia benono
- Nothopegia aureo-fulva
- Nothopegia castaneifolia
- Operculicarya capuronii
- Poupartia borbonica
- Semecarpus angulatus
- Semecarpus euodiifolius
- Semecarpus minutipetalus
- Semecarpus ochracea
- Semecarpus pseudo-emarginata
- Semecarpus sandakanus
- Sorindeia calantha

==== Burseraceae ====
- Canarium whitei
- Commiphora wightii

==== Meliaceae ====
Species

- Aglaia densitricha
- Aglaia evansensis
- Aglaia gracilis
- Aglaia heterotricha
- Aglaia mackiana
- Aglaia malabarica
- Aglaia pleuropteris
- Aglaia unifolia
- Dysoxylum pachypodum
- Dysoxylum peerisi
- Guarea sprucei
- Trichilia florbranca
- Turraea elephantina
- Walsura gardneri
- Walsura sarawakensis

Subspecies

- Trichilia trifolia subsp. pteleaefolia
- Turraea mombassana subsp. schliebenii

==== Rutaceae ====
Species

- Calodendrum eickii
- Citrus taiwanica
- Decazyx esparzae
- Glycosmis crassifolia
- Halfordia papuana
- Melicope adscendens
- Melicope degeneri
- Melicope fatuhivensis
- Melicope haupuensis
- Melicope knudsenii, Knudsen's melicope
- Melicope lydgatei
- Melicope mucronulata
- Melicope nealae
- Melicope quadrangularis, four-angled pelea
- Melicope reflexa
- Melicope stonei
- Melicope zahlbruckneri, Zahlbruckner's melicope
- Oxanthera undulata
- Platydesma rostrata
- Ravenia swartziana
- Sarcomelicope glauca
- Spathelia coccinea
- Zanthoxylum heterophyllum

Subspecies

- Pilocarpus goudotianus subsp. heterochromus

Varieties

- Zanthoxylum dipetalum var. tomentosum

==== Sapindaceae ====
Species

- Alectryon macrococcus
- Allophylus hispidus, synonym of Allophylus zeylanicus
- Cupania riopalenquensis
- Gongrospermum philippinense
- Guioa grandifoliola
- Guioa hospita
- Guioa palawanica
- Guioa parvifoliola
- Guioa reticulata
- Nephelium aculeatum
- Podonephelium cristagalli
- Podonephelium parvifolium
- Podonephelium subaequilaterum
- Talisia bullata
- Zollingeria borneensis

Varieties

- Alectryon macrococcus var. auwahiensis
- Alectryon macrococcus var. macrococcus

==== Simaroubaceae ====
- Ailanthus vietnamensis

==== Zygophyllaceae ====
- Tribulus rajasthanensis
- Zygophyllum bucharicum
- Zygophyllum darvasicum

=== Saxifragales ===
- Haloragis stokesii
- Molinadendron hondurense
- Ribes malvifolium
- Ribes sardoum, Sardinian currant
- Saxifraga artvinensis, Artvinian rockfoil

=== Solanales ===
Species

- Bonamia menziesii
- Cestrum tipocochense
- Convolvulus argyrothamnos
- Convolvulus durandoi
- Mellissia begonifolia, boxwood
- Nothocestrum breviflorum, small-flowered nothocestrum
- Nothocestrum peltatum
- Nymphoides macrospermum
- Nymphoides sivarajanii
- Solanum dolichorhachis
- Solanum drymophilum
- Solanum incompletum
- Solanum lanuginosum
- Solanum lidii
- Solanum ovum-fringillae
- Solanum semicoalitum (possibly extinct)
- Turbina inopinata

Varieties

- Ipomoea prismatosyphon var. trifida

=== Violales ===
Species

- Banara caymanensis
- Banara vanderbiltii
- Casearia mauritiana
- Casearia staffordiae
- Casearia williamsiana
- Frankenia portulacifolia, St Helena tea plant
- Gloeospermum boreale
- Helianthemum bystropogophyllum
- Helianthemum teneriffae
- Hoplestigma pierreanum
- Isodendrion laurifolium
- Isodendrion pyrifolium
- Nasa ferox
- Rinorea marginata
- Rinorea maximiliani
- Viola amamiana
- Viola helenae
- Viola hispida
- Viola ucriana
- Viola utchinensis
- Xylosma capillipes
- Xylosma crenata
- Xylosma pachyphylla, Spiny logwood
- Xylosma peltata
- Xylosma pininsularis
- Xylosma serrata (possibly extinct)

Subspecies

- Cistus heterophyllus subsp. carthaginensis
- Viola chamissoniana subsp. chamissoniana

=== Vitales ===
Varieties

- Cayratia pedata var. glabra

== Monocotyledons ==
=== Alismatales ===
- Najas marina subsp. arsenariensis

=== Arales ===
==== Araceae ====
Species

- Alocasia atropurpurea
- Alocasia sanderiana, Sander's alocasia
- Alocasia sinuata, Alocasia quilted dreams
- Amorphophallus interruptus
- Amorphophallus lanuginosus
- Amorphophallus synandrifer
- Anthurium coerulescens
- Anthurium eggersii
- Anthurium linguifolium
- Anthurium tenuicaule
- Arisaema kawashimae
- Arisaema rostratum
- Hapaline locii
- Philodendron balaoanum (possibly extinct)
- Philodendron cruentospathum
- Philodendron nanegalense
- Philodendron pogonocaule
- Syngonium dodsonianum
- Typhonium lineare
- Typhonium penicillatum

Subspecies

- Arisaema heterocephalum subsp. okinawaense

=== Arecales ===
Species

- Acanthophoenix rubra
- Aiphanes pilaris
- Areca mandacanii
- Areca unipa
- Asterogyne yaracuyense
- Astrocaryum minus
- Attalea crassispatha
- Bactris nancibaensis
- Balaka macrocarpa
- Basselinia moorei
- Calamus compsostachys
- Calamus obovoideus
- Calamus sabalensis
- Calamus wailong
- Carpoxylon macrospermum
- Caryota kiriwongensis
- Ceroxylon quindiuense
- Ceroxylon sasaimae
- Chamaedorea plumosa
- Clinostigma savaiiense
- Coccothrinax borhidiana
- Coccothrinax jimenezii
- Cryosophila cookii
- Cryosophila grayumii
- Cryosophila williamsii
- Cyphophoenix nucele
- Cyphosperma tanga
- Drymophloeus samoensis
- Dypsis albofarinosa
- Dypsis ambanjae
- Dypsis ambositrae
- Dypsis ampasindavae
- Dypsis andilamenensis
- Dypsis anjae
- Dypsis antanambensis
- Dypsis aquatilis
- Dypsis arenarum
- Dypsis basilonga
- Dypsis beentjei
- Dypsis brevicaulis
- Dypsis brittiana (possibly extinct)
- Dypsis canaliculata
- Dypsis carlsmithii
- Dypsis caudata
- Dypsis cookei
- Dypsis digitata
- Dypsis dracaenoides
- Dypsis elegans
- Dypsis gronophyllum
- Dypsis hovomantsina
- Dypsis humilis
- Dypsis ifanadianae
- Dypsis intermedia
- Dypsis interrupta
- Dypsis jeremiei
- Dypsis laevis
- Dypsis lanuginosa
- Dypsis leptocheilos
- Dypsis mahia
- Dypsis mangorensis
- Dypsis metallica
- Dypsis nauseosa
- Dypsis nossibensis
- Dypsis oropedionis
- Dypsis ovobontsira
- Dypsis pervillei
- Dypsis pulchella
- Dypsis pumila
- Dypsis rakotonasoloi
- Dypsis ramentacea
- Dypsis reflexa
- Dypsis remotiflora
- Dypsis robusta
- Dypsis sahanofensis
- Dypsis sancta
- Dypsis sanctaemariae
- Dypsis scandens
- Dypsis singularis
- Dypsis tanalensis
- Dypsis tokoravina
- Dypsis trapezoidea
- Dypsis vonitrandambo
- Hemithrinax ekmaniana
- Hyophorbe amaricaulis
- Hyophorbe lagenicaulis, bottle palm
- Hyophorbe vaughanii
- Hyophorbe verschaffeltii
- Juania australis
- Latania verschaffeltii
- Lavoixia macrocarpa
- Loxococcus rupicola
- Masoala madagascariensis
- Medemia argun
- Pelagodoxa henryana
- Pinanga tashiroi
- Pritchardia affinis
- Pritchardia aylmer-robinsonii
- Pritchardia hardyi
- Pritchardia kaalae
- Pritchardia limahuliensis
- Pritchardia munroi
- Pritchardia napaliensis
- Pritchardia schattaueri
- Pritchardia viscosa
- Pritchardia waialealeana
- Pritchardiopsis jeanneneyi
- Pseudophoenix ekmanii
- Pseudophoenix lediniana
- Ravenea beentjei
- Ravenea delicatula
- Ravenea hypoleuca
- Ravenea lakatra
- Ravenea latisecta
- Ravenea louvelii
- Ravenea moorei
- Ravenea musicalis
- Tahina spectabilis, Tahina palm
- Tectiphiala ferox
- Voanioala gerardii

Varieties

- Dictyosperma album var. album
- Dictyosperma album var. conjugatum, hurricane palm
- Roystonea regia var. hondurensis

=== Asparagales ===
==== Orchidaceae ====
Species

- Aeranthes albidiflora (possibly extinct)
- Aeranthes leandriana
- Aeranthes multinodis
- Amesiella monticola
- Anathallis kleinii
- Angraecum mahavavense (possibly extinct)
- Angraecum muscicolum (possibly extinct)
- Angraecum palmicolum
- Angraecum perhumile (possibly extinct)
- Angraecum peyrotii
- Angraecum pinifolium
- Angraecum potamophilum (possibly extinct)
- Angraecum rigidifolium (possibly extinct)
- Angraecum rubellum (possibly extinct)
- Angraecum serpens (possibly extinct)
- Angraecum sterrophyllum (possibly extinct)
- Anguloa cliftonii, Clifton's anguloa
- Ascoglossum calopterum
- Benthamia dauphinensis
- Benthamia nigro-vaginata (possibly extinct)
- Brachionidium pteroglossum
- Bulbophyllum ceriodorum
- Bulbophyllum erythroglossum (possibly extinct)
- Bulbophyllum filiforme
- Bulbophyllum kupense
- Bulbophyllum minax (possibly extinct)
- Bulbophyllum moratii
- Bulbophyllum sanguineum (possibly extinct)
- Bulbophyllum tampoketsense (possibly extinct)
- Ceratocentron fesselii
- Corybas dienemus, Windswept helmet orchid
- Cryptopus dissectus
- Cyclopogon werffii
- Cynorkis ambondrombensis
- Cynorkis bimaculata (possibly extinct)
- Cynorkis catatii (possibly extinct)
- Cynorkis formosa
- Cynorkis globifera
- Cynorkis henrici
- Cynorkis humbertii
- Cynorkis monadenia
- Cynorkis muscicola
- Cynorkis pinguicularioides
- Cynorkis pseudorolfei
- Cynorkis rolfei (possibly extinct)
- Cynorkis sacculata
- Cynorkis sagittata
- Cynorkis schlechterii
- Cynorkis souegesii
- Cynorkis sylvatica (possibly extinct)
- Cynorkis tristis
- Cynorkis usambarae (possibly extinct)
- Cypripedium daweishanense
- Cypripedium froschii
- Cypripedium malipoense, Malipo cypripedium
- Cypripedium segawae, Segawa's cypripedium
- Cypripedium taibaiense, Mt Taibai cypripedium
- Cypripedium wumengense
- Dendrobium huoshanense
- Dendrobium officinale
- Dendrobium schuetzei
- Dendrophylax fawcettii
- Diaphananthe orientalis (possibly extinct)
- Diplandrorchis sinica
- Disperis bosseri (possibly extinct)
- Disperis ciliata
- Disperis egregia (possibly extinct)
- Diuris byronensis, Byron Bay donkey orchid
- Encyclia kingsii
- Epidendrum montserratense, Montserrat orchid
- Eulophia grandidieri (possibly extinct)
- Eulophia mangenotiana
- Gastrochilus calceolaris
- Gastrodia africana
- Gastrodia zeylanica
- Genyorchis platybulbon
- Goodyera flaccida
- Goodyera macrophylla
- Goodyera perrieri
- Grammangis spectabilis
- Grandiphyllum schunkeanum
- Graphorkis medemiae
- Habenaria maitlandii
- Hexalectris revoluta, Chisos mountain crested coralroot
- Holopogon gaudissartii
- Liparis goodyeroides
- Malaxis bayardii, Bayard's adder's-mouth orchid
- Masdevallia apparitio, Apparition masdevallia
- Mexipedium xerophyticum, Dry-growing mexipedium
- Mystacidium nguruense
- Ossiculum aurantiacum
- Paphiopedilum adductum
- Paphiopedilum bougainvilleanum, Bougainville paphiopedilum
- Paphiopedilum canhii
- Paphiopedilum cornuatum
- Paphiopedilum dayanum, Day's paphiopedilum
- Paphiopedilum delenatii, Delanat's paphiopedilum
- Paphiopedilum druryi, Drury's paphiopedilum
- Paphiopedilum emersonii, Emerson's paphiopedilum
- Paphiopedilum exul, Excluded paphiopedilum
- Paphiopedilum fairrieanum, Fairrie's paphiopedilum
- Paphiopedilum fowliei, Fowlie's paphiopedilum
- Paphiopedilum gigantifolium, Giant-leaf paphiopedilum
- Paphiopedilum gratrixianum, Gratix's paphiopedilum
- Paphiopedilum guangdongense
- Paphiopedilum hangianum, Hang's paphiopedilum
- Paphiopedilum helenae, Ellen's paphiopedilum
- Paphiopedilum henryanum, Henry's paphiopedilum
- Paphiopedilum inamorii, Inamori's paphiopedilum
- Paphiopedilum intaniae, Intani paphiopedilum
- Paphiopedilum kolopakingii, Kolopaking's paphiopedilum
- Paphiopedilum lawrenceanum, Lawrence's paphiopedilum
- Paphiopedilum liemianum, Liem's paphiopedilum
- Paphiopedilum micranthum, Tiny flowered paphiopedilum
- Paphiopedilum ooii, Ooi's paphiopedilum
- Paphiopedilum parnatanum, Parnata's paphiopedilum
- Paphiopedilum platyphyllum, Broad-leaf paphiopedilum
- Paphiopedilum primulinum, Primrose yellow paphiopedilum
- Paphiopedilum purpuratum, Purple paphiopedilum
- Paphiopedilum qingyongii
- Paphiopedilum rothschildianum, Rothschild's paphiopedilum
- Paphiopedilum sanderianum, Sander's paphiopedilum
- Paphiopedilum sangii, Sang's paphiopedilum
- Paphiopedilum schoseri, Schoser's paphiopedilum
- Paphiopedilum stonei, Stone's paphiopedilum
- Paphiopedilum sugiyamanum, Sugiyama's paphiopedilum
- Paphiopedilum sukhakulii, Sukhakul's paphiopedilum
- Paphiopedilum supardii, Supard's paphiopedilum
- Paphiopedilum thaianum, Thai paphiopediulum
- Paphiopedilum tranlienianum, Tran's paphiopedilum
- Paphiopedilum urbanianum, Urban's paphiopedilum
- Paphiopedilum victoria-mariae, Virgin Mary paphiopedilum
- Paphiopedilum victoria-regina, Queen Victoria paphiopedilum
- Paphiopedilum vietnamense, Vietnamese paphiopedilum
- Paphiopedilum wenshanense, Wenshan paphiopedilum
- Paphiopedilum wentworthianum, Wentworth's paphiopedilum
- Peristylus holochila
- Phalaenopsis hainanensis
- Phalaenopsis micholitzii
- Phragmipedium andreettae
- Phragmipedium anguloi
- Phragmipedium christiansenianum, Christiansen's phragmipedium
- Phragmipedium dalessandroi, Dalessandro's phragmipedium
- Phragmipedium exstaminodium, Without a staminoda phragmipedium
- Phragmipedium fischeri, Fischer's phragmipedium
- Phragmipedium kovachii, Kovach's phragmipedium
- Phragmipedium manzurii, Manzur's phragmipedium
- Phragmipedium richteri, Richter's phragmipedium
- Phragmipedium tetzlaffianum, Tetzlaff's phragmipedium
- Polystachya acuminata (possibly extinct)
- Polystachya canaliculata (possibly extinct)
- Polystachya kupensis
- Polystachya porphyrochila (possibly extinct)
- Polystachya rugosilabia (possibly extinct)
- Polystachya victoriae
- Prasophyllum favonium, Western leek orchid
- Selenipedium chironianum
- Selenipedium vanillocarpum
- Serapias stenopetala
- Tridactyle sarcodantha (possibly extinct)
- Zeuxine rolfeana

Subspecies

- Cynorkis buchwaldiana subsp. buchwaldiana

==== Other Asparagales ====
Species

- Allium baytopiorum, Baytop's onion
- Allium corsicum
- Allium czelghauricum, Czelghaurian onion
- Aloe boscawenii
- Aloe brunneostriata
- Aloe classenii
- Aloe dorotheae
- Aloe flexilifolia
- Aloe ghibensis
- Aloe helenae
- Aloe jucunda
- Aloe leptosiphon
- Aloe molederana
- Aloe pembana
- Aloe suzannae
- Aloidendron pillansii (as Aloe pillansii), bastard quiver tree
- Astelia waialealae
- Brimeura duvigneaudii
- Chlorophytum borivilianum
- Chlorophytum petrophilum
- Chlorophytum rhizopendulum
- Crinum malabaricum
- Galanthus trojanus
- Iris antilibanotica
- Iris atropurpurea, Coastal iris
- Iris boissieri
- Iris cedreti
- Iris damascena
- Iris nusairiensis
- Mastigostyla orurensis
- Ornithogalum gabrielianiae, Gabrielyan's starflowers
- Romulea antiatlantica
- Scilla morrisii, Morris squill

Subspecies

- Narcissus nevadensis subsp. enemeritoi

=== Bromeliales ===
- Aechmea cymosopaniculata (possibly extinct)
- Cryptanthus diamantinensis
- Guzmania bismarckii
- Guzmania lepidota (possibly extinct)
- Guzmania poortmanii (possibly extinct)
- Guzmania striata (possibly extinct)
- Hohenbergia caymanensis, Old George
- Pitcairnia elliptica
- Pitcairnia oranensis
- Puya compacta
- Puya exigua
- Tillandsia dyeriana
- Tillandsia yerba-santae

=== Commelinales ===
- Commelina mwatayamvoana
- Xyris andina
- Xyris diaphanobracteata
- Xyris exigua
- Xyris ramboi

=== Dioscoreales ===
- Afrothismia baerae
- Afrothismia pachyantha
- Borderea chouardii, synonym of Dioscorea chouardii
- Dioscorea strydomiana
- Oxygyne shinzatoi
- Oxygyne triandra

=== Eriocaulales ===
- Eriocaulon bolei
- Eriocaulon petraeum
- Eriocaulon ratnagiricum
- Eriocaulon rouxianum
- Eriocaulon santapaui
- Eriocaulon sharmae
- Eriocaulon sivarajanii
- Eriocaulon sulanum

=== Liliales ===
- Bomarea angustifolia
- Bomarea goniocaulon
- Bomarea graminifolia
- Bomarea hartwegii
- Bomarea longipes
- Colchicum greuteri, Greuter's colchicum
- Colchicum leptanthum, thin-flowered colchicum
- Fritillaria grandiflora, big-flowered fritillary
- Gagea antakiensis, Antakya gagea
- Lilium polyphyllum
- Tulipa gumusanica, Gumushanian tulip

=== Pandanales ===
- Asplundia clementinae
- Asplundia lutea
- Kupea martinetugei
- Pandanus carmichaelii
- Pandanus microcarpus
- Pandanus palustris
- Pandanus pyramidalis
- Pandanus verecundus

=== Poales ===
There are 37 species, two subspecies, and two varieties in Cyperales assessed as critically endangered.

==== Cyperaceae ====
Species

- Bulbostylis fusiformis
- Bulbostylis neglecta, Neglected tuft sedge
- Carex austromexicana
- Carex collifera
- Carex lapazensis
- Carex lepida
- Carex ownbeyi
- Carex tessellata
- Cyperus chionocephalus (possibly extinct)
- Cyperus flavoculmis
- Cyperus grandifolius
- Cyperus microcristatus
- Cyperus microumbellatus
- Cyperus multifolius, synonym of Cyperus prolixus (possibly extinct)
- Eleocharis lepta (possibly extinct)
- Fimbristylis hirsutifolia
- Hypolytrum subcompositus
- Scleria guineensis

Varieties

- Cyperus pennatiformis var. bryanii

==== Juncaceae ====
- Juncus maroccanus

==== Poaceae ====
Species

- Andropogon benthamianus (possibly extinct)
- Cenchrus agrimonioides
- Eragrostis episcopulus, Cliff hair grass
- Eragrostis muerensis
- Festuca aloha
- Garnotia cheesemanii, Rarotongan garnotia grass
- Garnotia sechellensis
- Humbertochloa greenwayi
- Isachne meeboldii
- Isachne veldkampii
- Ischaemum jayachandranii
- Panicum niihauense
- Panicum pearsonii (possibly extinct)
- Panicum socotranum
- Poa mannii
- Poa siphonoglossa
- Puccinellia raroflorens
- Sporobolus caespitosus
- Stipa tulcanensis

Subspecies

- Puccinellia distans subsp. embergeri
- Puccinellia distans subsp. font-queri

Varieties

- Cenchrus agrimonioides var. agrimonioides

=== Zingiberales ===
- Alpinia diversifolia
- Calathea dodsonii
- Costus barbatus
- Costus geothyrsus
- Costus louisii
- Costus vinosus (possibly extinct in the wild)
- Curcuma vitellina
- Goeppertia petersenii
- Newmania serpens
- Smithatris supraneanae

== See also ==
- Lists of IUCN Red List critically endangered species
- List of least concern plants
- List of near threatened plants
- List of vulnerable plants
- List of endangered plants
- List of recently extinct plants
- List of data deficient plants
