= Pinus cernua =

Scientific classification
- Kingdom: Plantae
- Clade: Tracheophytes
- Clade: Gymnospermae
- Division: Pinophyta
- Class: Pinopsida
- Order: Pinales
- Family: Pinaceae
- Genus: Pinus
- Species: P. cernua

Binomial name
- Pinus cernua P.K.Lôc ex Aver., K.S.Nguyen & T.H.Nguyên

Species of plant

Pinus cernua is a pine species, Pinaceae. It is critically endangered.

== Distribution ==
It is found in Vietnam. There are studies to aid conservation.

== Taxonomy ==
It was named by L. K. Phan ex Aver., Khang Sinh Nguyen and T. H. Nguyen, in Nordic J. Bot. 32: 792 in 2014.
