= Centaurea tamanianiae =

Thin-leaved centaury

Conservation status
- Critically Endangered (IUCN 3.1)

Scientific classification
- Kingdom: Plantae
- Clade: Tracheophytes
- Clade: Angiosperms
- Clade: Eudicots
- Clade: Asterids
- Order: Asterales
- Family: Asteraceae
- Genus: Centaurea
- Species: C. tamanianiae

Binomial name
- Centaurea tamanianiae M.V.Agab.

Species of plant

Centaurea leptophylla, or Tamanyan's centaury, is a flowering plant in the family Asteraceae. The IUCN has classified the species as critically endangered.

It is native to the Caucasus in Armenia.

== Taxonomy ==
It was named by Mariam V. Agababjan, in: Biol. Zhurn. Arnz., 42(3): 187. in 1989.
