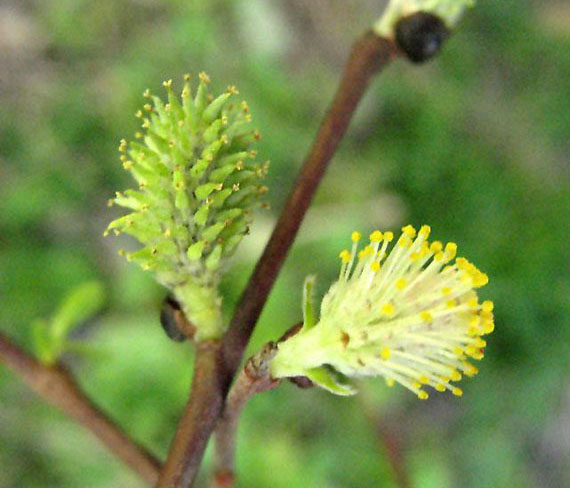

Conservation status
- Vulnerable (IUCN 3.1)

Scientific classification
- Kingdom: Plantae
- Clade: Tracheophytes
- Clade: Angiosperms
- Clade: Eudicots
- Clade: Rosids
- Order: Malpighiales
- Family: Salicaceae
- Genus: Salix
- Species: S. tarraconensis

Binomial name
- Salix tarraconensis Pau

= Salix tarraconensis =

Species of willow

Salix tarraconensis is a species of willow in the family Salicaceae. It is endemic to Spain, where it grows in subalpine scree at 500–1,400 m (1,640–4,590 ft) altitude in Tarragona and Castellon.

It is a deciduous small shrub growing to 1 m (3 ft 3 in) tall. The leaves are alternate, 5–15 mm (0.20–0.59 in) long and 2–5 mm (0.079–0.197 in) broad, with a very finely serrated margin; they are green above, and paler below with short whitish hairs.
