= Rhododendron wilhelminae =

Conservation status
- Critically Endangered (IUCN 3.1)

Scientific classification
- Kingdom: Plantae
- Clade: Tracheophytes
- Clade: Angiosperms
- Clade: Eudicots
- Clade: Asterids
- Order: Ericales
- Family: Ericaceae
- Genus: Rhododendron
- Species: R. wilhelminae

Binomial name
- Rhododendron wilhelminae Hochr.

Species of plant

Rhododendron wilhelminae is a species of plant in the family Ericaceae, endemic to Java in Indonesia. It is a critically endangered species threatened by habitat loss.
