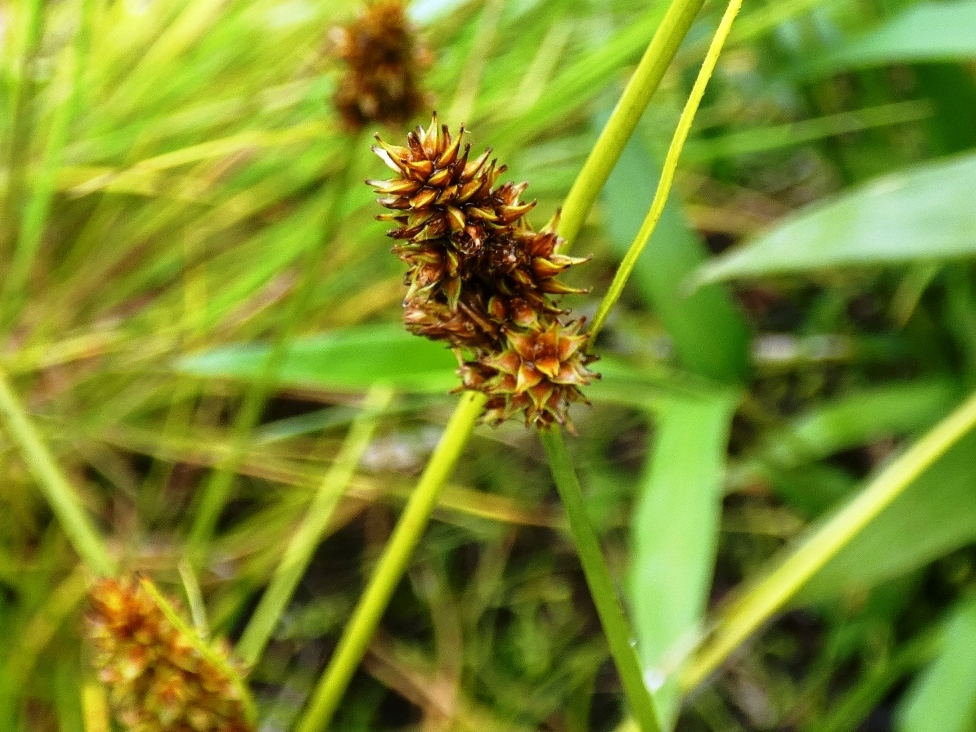

Conservation status
- Critically Endangered (IUCN 3.1)

Scientific classification
- Kingdom: Plantae
- Clade: Embryophytes
- Clade: Tracheophytes
- Clade: Angiosperms
- Clade: Monocots
- Clade: Commelinids
- Order: Poales
- Family: Cyperaceae
- Genus: Carex
- Species: C. ownbeyi

Binomial name
- Carex ownbeyi G.A.Wheeler

= Carex ownbeyi =

Species of plant

Carex ownbeyi is a tussock-forming species of perennial sedge in the family Cyperaceae. Its native range is confined to Bolivia and it has been assessed as a critically endangered species.

== See also ==
- List of Carex species
