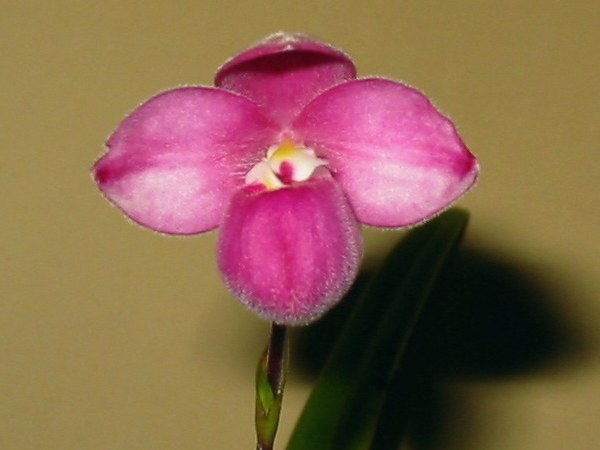
- Flower of Phragmipedium fischeri

Scientific classification
- Kingdom: Plantae
- Clade: Tracheophytes
- Clade: Angiosperms
- Clade: Monocots
- Order: Asparagales
- Family: Orchidaceae
- Subfamily: Cypripedioideae
- Genus: Phragmipedium
- Species: P. fischeri

Binomial name
- Phragmipedium fischeri Braem & H.Mohr

= Phragmipedium fischeri =

Species of orchid

Phragmipedium fischeri is a species of orchid endemic to Ecuador.
