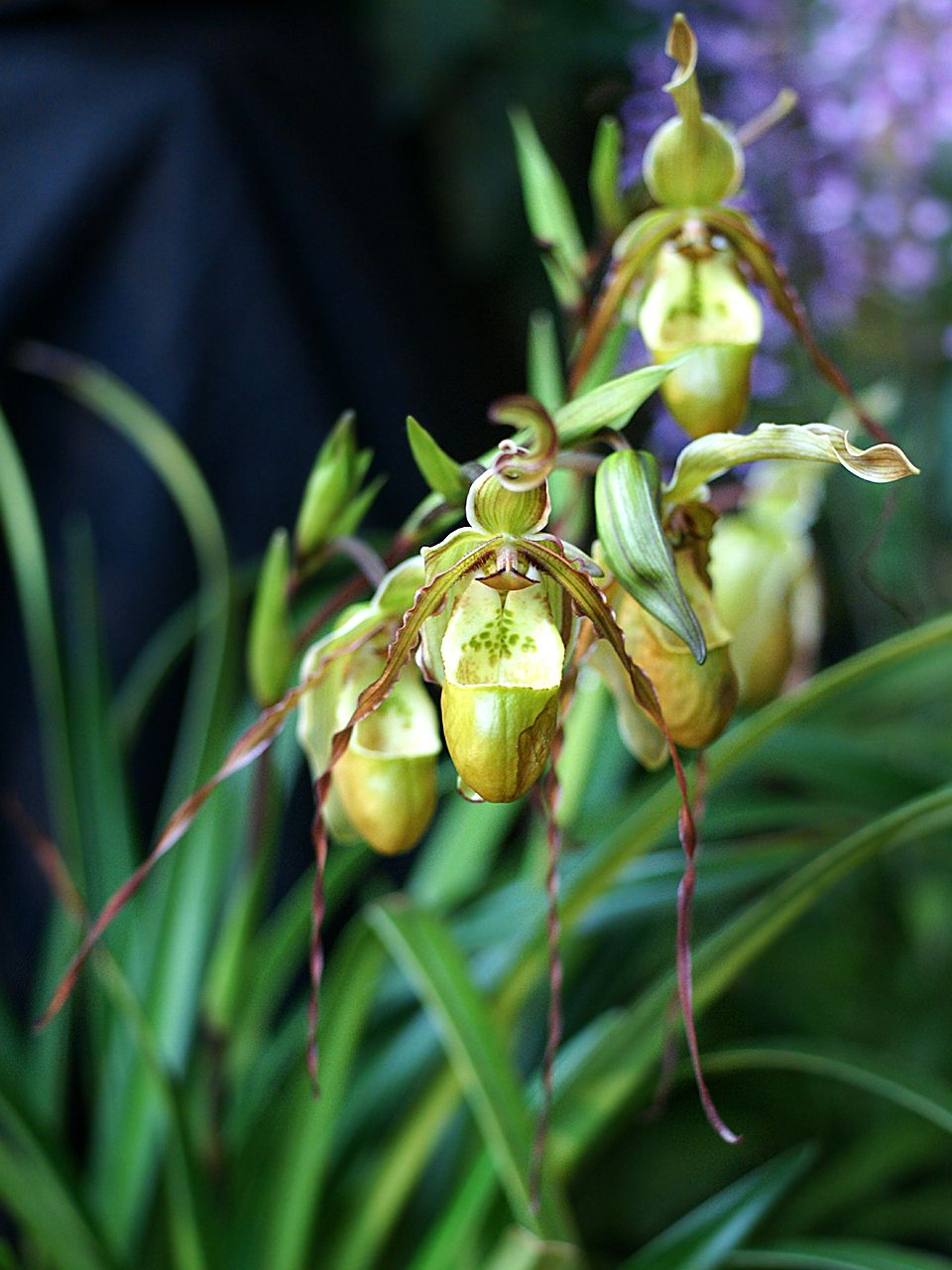
- Flower of Phragmipedium tetzlaffianum

Conservation status
- Critically Endangered (IUCN 3.1)

Scientific classification
- Kingdom: Plantae
- Clade: Tracheophytes
- Clade: Angiosperms
- Clade: Monocots
- Order: Asparagales
- Family: Orchidaceae
- Subfamily: Cypripedioideae
- Genus: Phragmipedium
- Species: P. tetzlaffianum

Binomial name
- Phragmipedium tetzlaffianum O.Gruss

= Phragmipedium tetzlaffianum =

Species of orchid

Phragmipedium tetzlaffianum is a species of orchid endemic to Venezuela.
