= Astragalus ornithopodioides =

Scientific classification
- Kingdom: Plantae
- Clade: Tracheophytes
- Clade: Angiosperms
- Clade: Eudicots
- Clade: Rosids
- Order: Fabales
- Family: Fabaceae
- Subfamily: Faboideae
- Genus: Astragalus
- Species: A. ornithopodioides

Binomial name
- Astragalus ornithopodioides Lam.

Synonyms
- Astragalus bylowae Elenevsky; Astragalus conrathii Freyn; Astragalus horwoodii Eig; Astragalus multijugus (Trautv.) Grossh., nom. illeg.; Astragalus nigrostriatus K.Koch; Astragalus stevenianus var. multijugus Trautv.; Astragalus trigonelloides Boiss.; Tragacantha ornithopodioides (Lam.) Kuntze; Tragacantha trigonelloides (Boiss.) Kuntze

Species of plant

Astragalus ornithopodioides is a species of flowering plant in the family Fabaceae, native to west and north Iran, the South Caucasus (Transcaucasus) and Turkey. It was first described by Jean-Baptiste Lamarck in 1783. Under the synonym Astragalus bylowae, a population occurring in Armenia was assessed as "vulnerable" in 2006.

== Conservation ==
Astragalus bylowae was assessed as "critically endangered" in 2006 for the IUCN Red List, where it is said to be native only to a small area of Armenia. As of April 2023, A. bylowae was regarded as a synonym of Astragalus ornithopodioides, which has a wider distribution that includes Iran and Turkey.
