= Sebastiania howardiana =

Conservation status
- Critically Endangered (IUCN 2.3)

Scientific classification
- Kingdom: Plantae
- Clade: Tracheophytes
- Clade: Angiosperms
- Clade: Eudicots
- Clade: Rosids
- Order: Malpighiales
- Family: Euphorbiaceae
- Genus: Sebastiania
- Species: S. howardiana

Binomial name
- Sebastiania howardiana Proctor

Species of flowering plant

Sebastiania howardiana is a species of plant in the family Euphorbiaceae. It is endemic to Jamaica.
