= Gaertnera truncata =

Conservation status
- Critically Endangered (IUCN 2.3)

Scientific classification
- Kingdom: Plantae
- Clade: Tracheophytes
- Clade: Angiosperms
- Clade: Eudicots
- Clade: Asterids
- Order: Gentianales
- Family: Rubiaceae
- Genus: Gaertnera
- Species: G. truncata

Binomial name
- Gaertnera truncata A.DC

Species of plant

Gaertnera truncata is a species of plant in the family Rubiaceae. It is endemic to Mauritius. Its natural habitat is subtropical or tropical dry forests.
