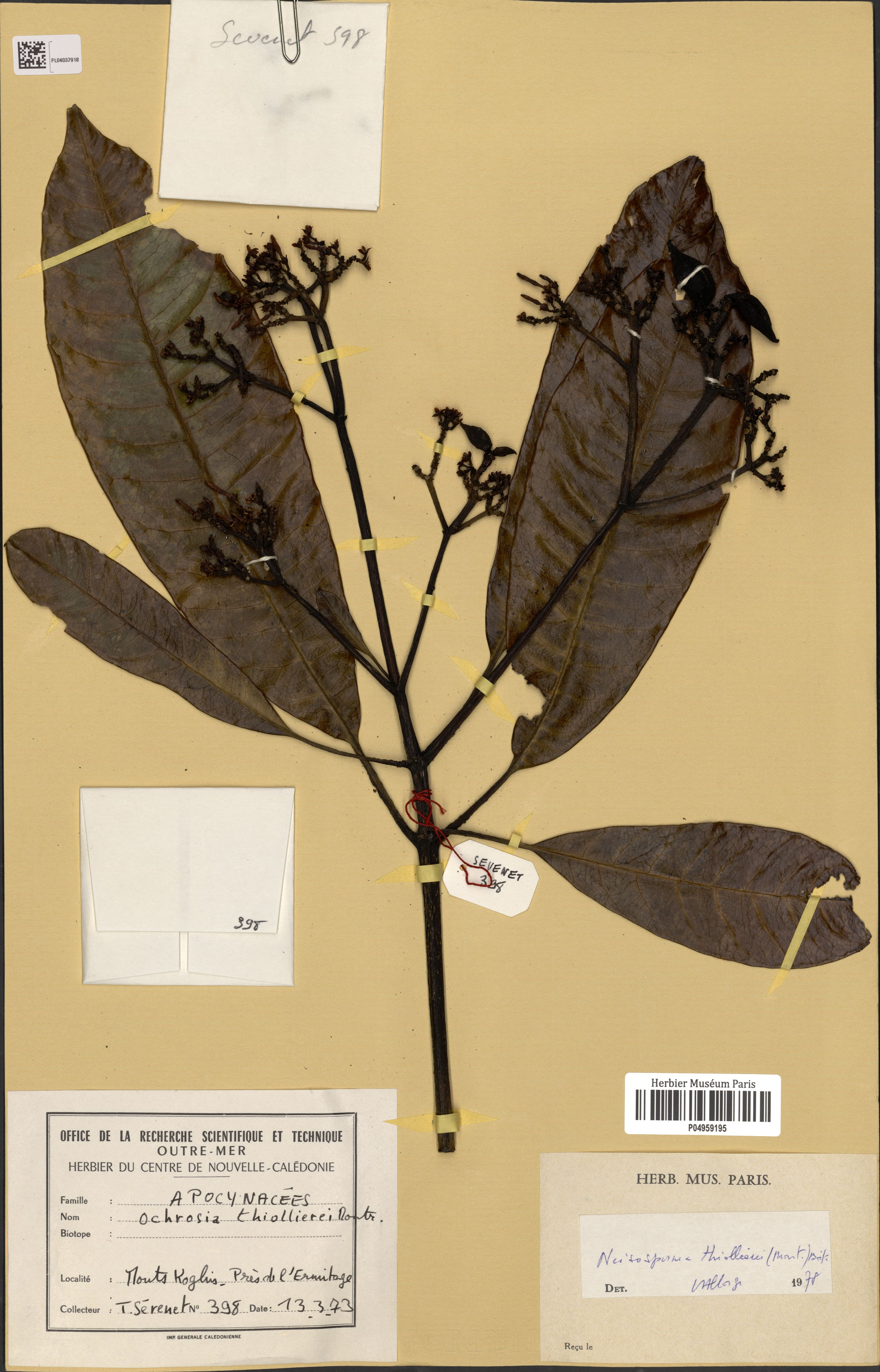

Conservation status
- Critically Endangered (IUCN 2.3)

Scientific classification
- Kingdom: Plantae
- Clade: Tracheophytes
- Clade: Angiosperms
- Clade: Eudicots
- Clade: Asterids
- Order: Gentianales
- Family: Apocynaceae
- Genus: Ochrosia
- Species: O. thiollierei

Binomial name
- Ochrosia thiollierei Montrouz.

Synonyms
- Calpicarpum thiollierei (Montrouz.) Boiteau; Neisosperma thiollierei (Montrouz.) Boiteau

= Ochrosia thiollierei =

Species of plant

Ochrosia thiollierei, synonym Neisosperma thiollierei, is a species of plant in the family Apocynaceae. It is endemic to New Caledonia. It is threatened by habitat loss.
