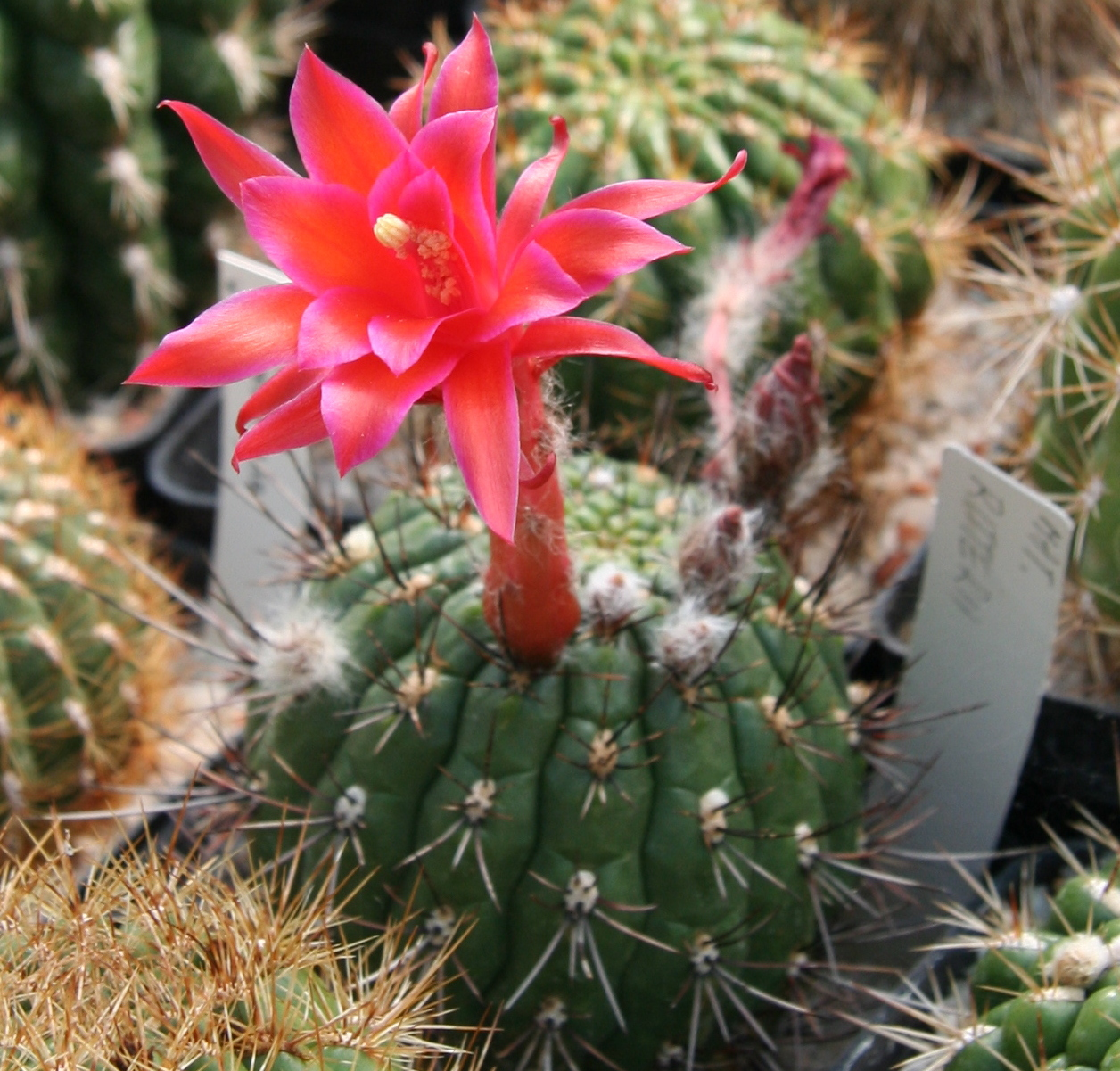

Conservation status
- Critically Endangered (IUCN 3.1)

Scientific classification
- Kingdom: Plantae
- Clade: Tracheophytes
- Clade: Angiosperms
- Clade: Eudicots
- Order: Caryophyllales
- Family: Cactaceae
- Subfamily: Cactoideae
- Genus: Matucana
- Species: M. ritteri

Binomial name
- Matucana ritteri Buining 1959

= Matucana ritteri =

Species of cactus

Matucana ritteri is a species of Matucana found in Peru.

== Description ==
Matucana ritteri usually grows solitary with flattened spherical, glossy dark green shoots and reaches a height of 3 to 5 cm (1.2 to 2.0 in) with a diameter of 5 to 10 cm (2.0 to 3.9 in). There are twelve to 22 blunt ribs present. The straight to slightly curved brownish-black spines turn gray with age. The one to five central spines are 2 to 4 cm (0.79 to 1.57 in), the seven to 14 radial spines 1 to 3 cm (0.39 to 1.18 in) long.

The crooked, crimson flowers are 7 to 9 cm (2.8 to 3.5 in) long and have a diameter of 4.5 to 5 cm (1.8 to 2.0 in). The bright red and green, scaly fruits reach a diameter of 1 to 1.5 cm (0.39 to 0.59 in).

== Distribution ==
Matucana ritteri is common in the region of La Libertad in Peru, near Otuzco at altitudes of 2500 meters.

== Taxonomy ==
The first description was in 1959 by Albert Frederik Hendrik Buining. The specific epithet ritteri honors the German cacti specialist Friedrich Ritter. Nomenclature synonyms are Submatucana ritteri (Buining) Backeb. (1962) and Borzicactus ritteri (Buining) Donald (1971).
