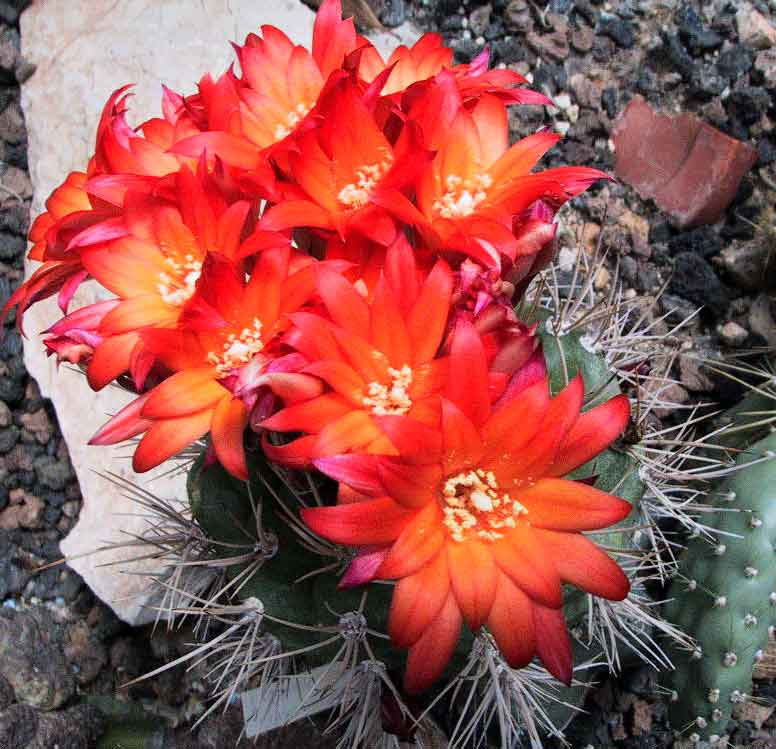

Conservation status
- Critically Endangered (IUCN 2.3)

Scientific classification
- Kingdom: Plantae
- Clade: Tracheophytes
- Clade: Angiosperms
- Clade: Eudicots
- Order: Caryophyllales
- Family: Cactaceae
- Subfamily: Cactoideae
- Genus: Matucana
- Species: M. oreodoxa

Binomial name
- Matucana oreodoxa (F.Ritter) Slaba

Synonyms
- Borzicactus oreodoxus (F.Ritter) Donald 1971; Eomatucana oreodoxa F.Ritter 1965

= Matucana oreodoxa =

Species of cactus

Matucana oreodoxa is a species of Matucana found in Peru.

== Description ==
Matucana oreodoxa usually grows solitary with spherical, grass-green to dark green shoots and reaches a diameter of up to 8 cm (3.1 in) and a height of 8-15 cm (5.9 in) tall. A thick taproot is formed. There are seven to twelve flattened ribs, which are divided into round bumps. The straight to slightly curved, flexible, brownish spines turn gray with age. The one to two central spines are 1.5 to 4 cm (0.59 to 1.57 in) and four to ten radial spines 1 to 3 cm (0.39 to 1.18 in) long.

The slender, funnel-shaped, radially symmetrical, orange-red flowers are 8 to 10 cm (3.1 to 3.9 in) long and have a diameter of 3 to 5.5 cm (1.2 to 2.2 in). The egg-shaped, light green fruits reach a diameter of up to 8 mm (0.31 in).

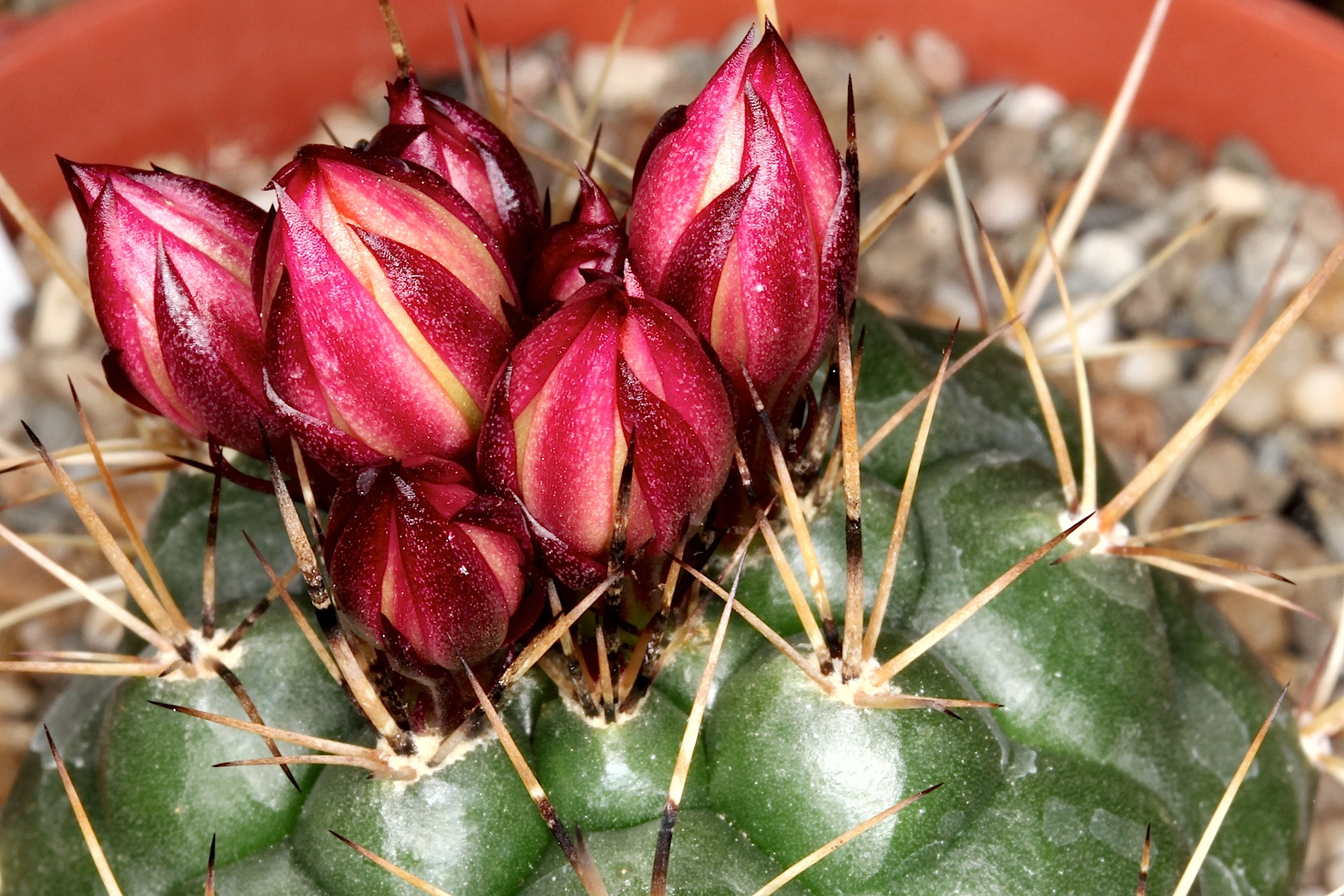
Buds

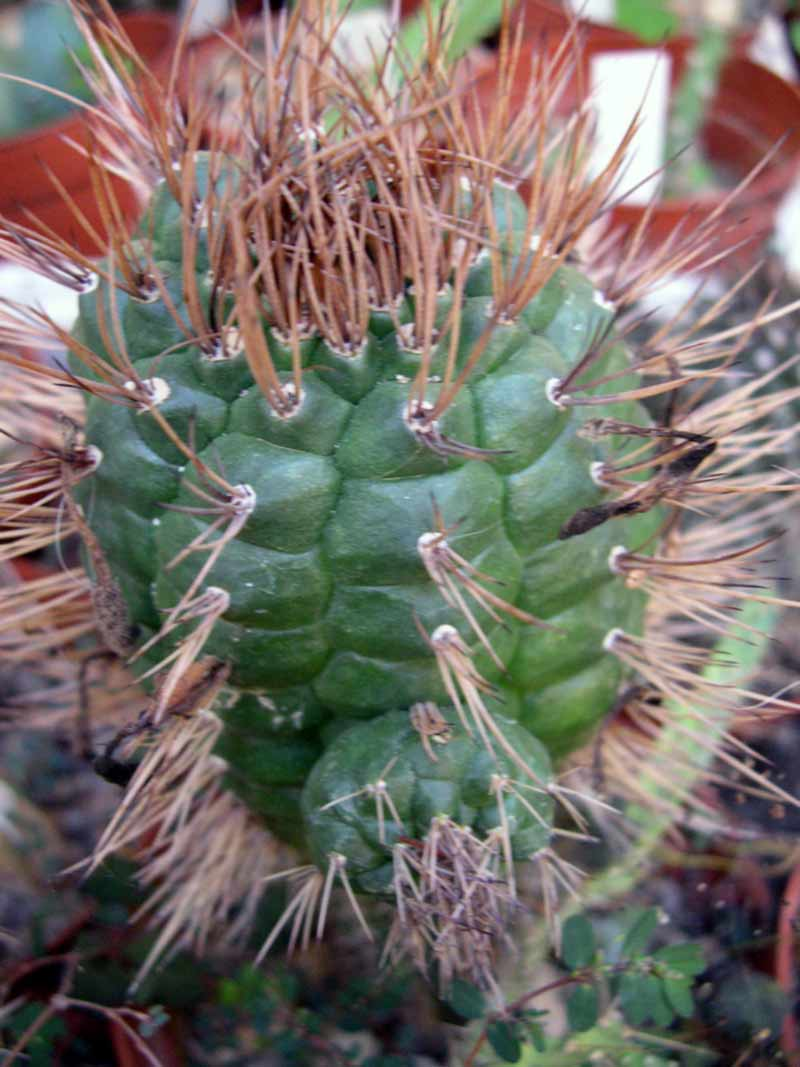
plant

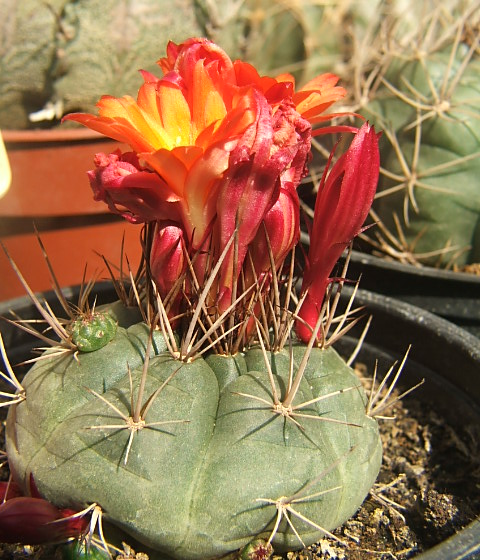
Flowers

== Distribution ==
Matucana oreodoxa is found in the Peruvian region of Ancash in the valley of the Río Puchca at altitudes of 1800 to 3000 meters.

== Taxonomy ==
The first description as Eomatucana oreodoxa was made in 1965 by Friedrich Ritter. Rudolf Slaba placed the species in the genus Matucana in 1973. Another nomenclature synonym is Borzicactus oreodoxus (F.Ritter) Donald (1971).
