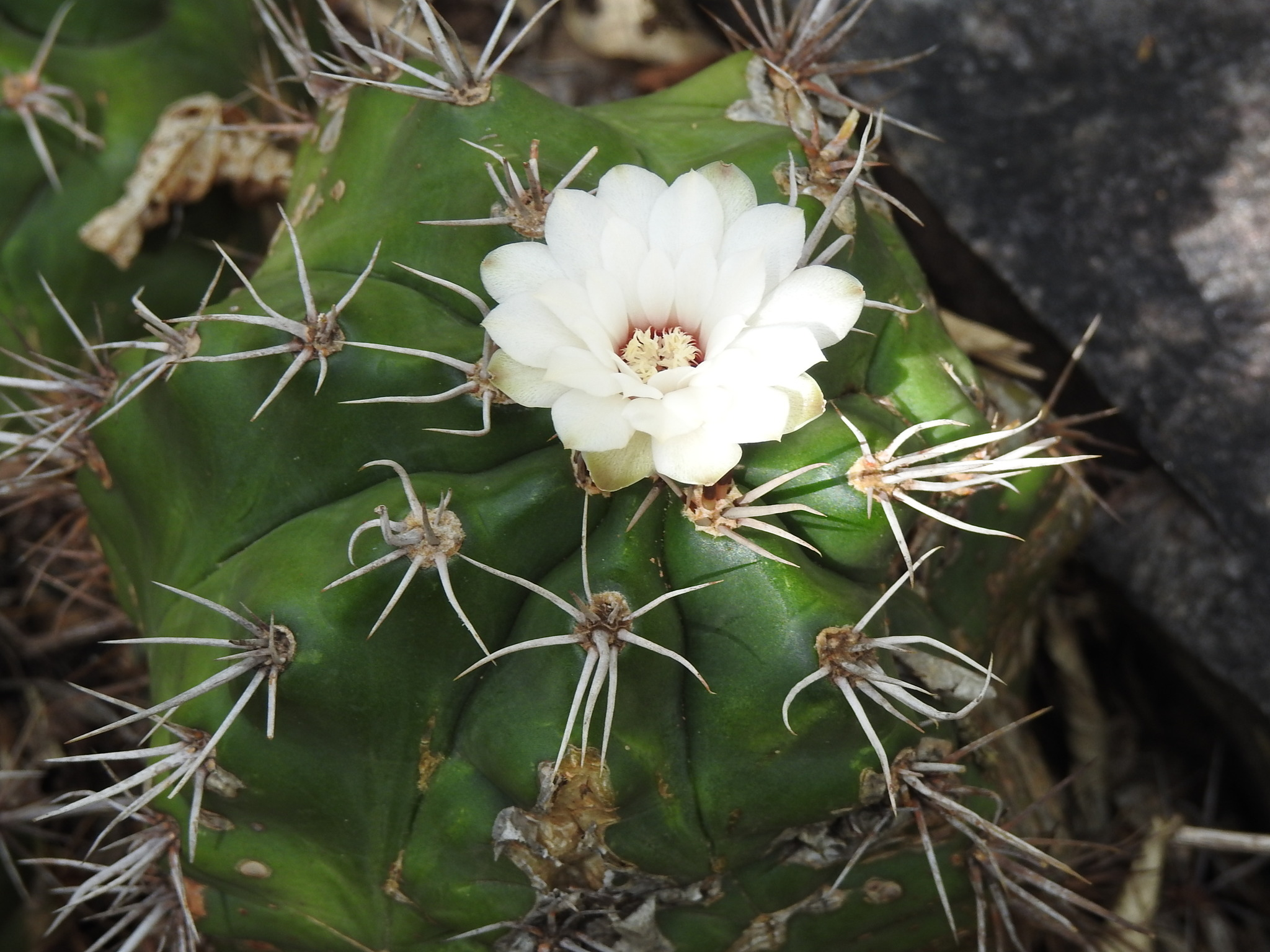

Scientific classification
- Kingdom: Plantae
- Clade: Tracheophytes
- Clade: Angiosperms
- Clade: Eudicots
- Order: Caryophyllales
- Family: Cactaceae
- Subfamily: Cactoideae
- Genus: Gymnocalycium
- Species: G. paediophylum

Binomial name
- Gymnocalycium paediophylum F. Ritter 1977

= Gymnocalycium paediophylum =

Species of cactus

Gymnocalycium paediophylum is a species of Gymnocalycium from Paraguay.

== Description ==
Gymnocalycium paediophilum is a clumping cactus with round to short cylindrical green stems, 10–20 cm tall and 5–8 cm in diameter, with 6–10 slightly warty ribs. It has a strong central spine, 1.5–2.5 cm long, sometimes accompanied by 2 smaller spines, and 5–7 upright, brown radial spines up to 3 cm long. Its pink to light red flowers, which open widely, measure 4.5–6 cm in length and 5–6 cm in diameter. The green to blue-green fruits are 1–1.8 cm long and 0.7–1.5 cm in diameter.

== Distribution ==
This species is native to the Boquerón, Paraguay department of Paraguay growing in quartz and rocks at elevations from 220 to 270 meters.

== Taxonomy ==
Gymnocalycium paediophilum was first described in 1979 by Friedrich Ritter. The epithet paediophilum, meaning "child-loving", references the numerous children Ritter educated.
