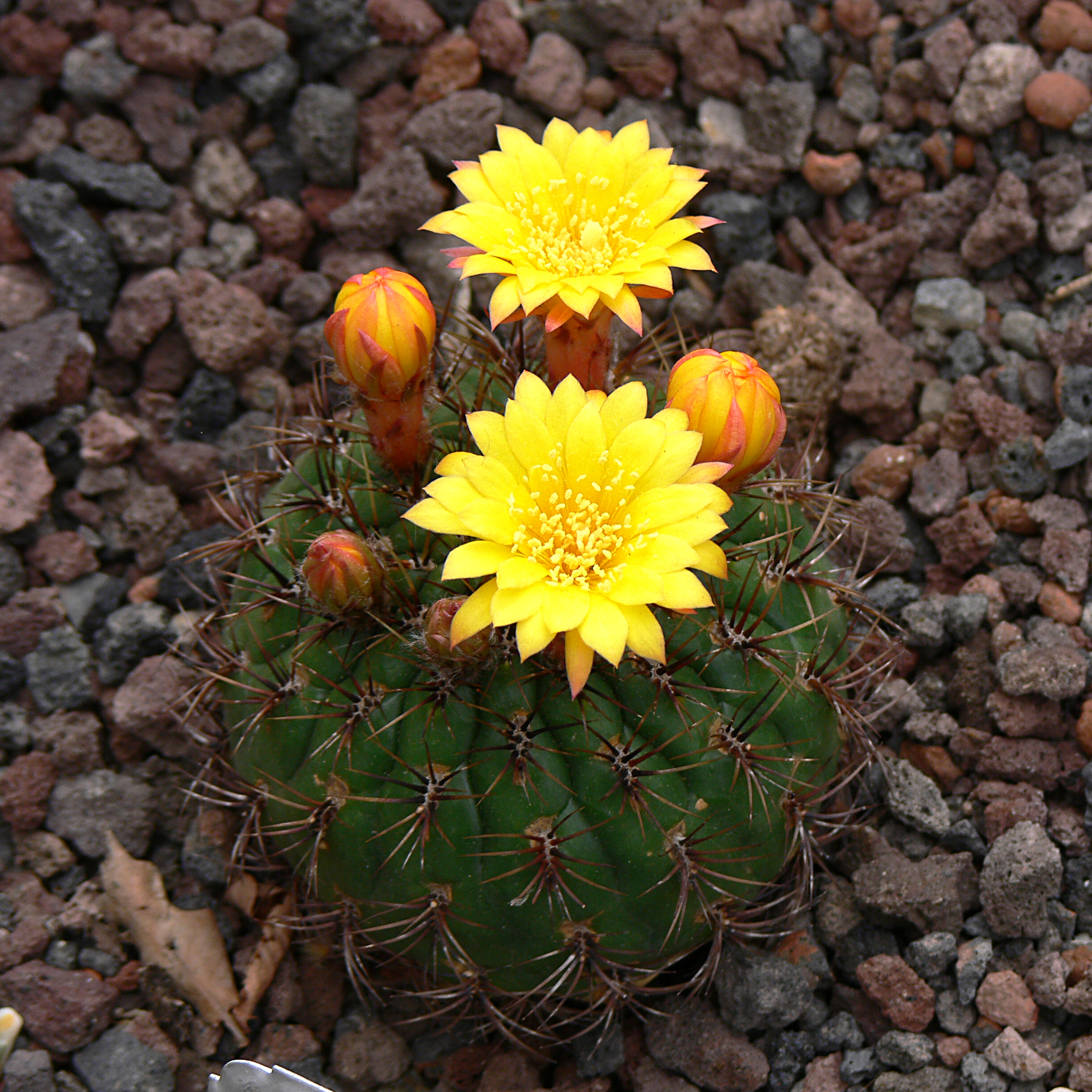

Conservation status
- Critically Endangered (IUCN 2.3)

Scientific classification
- Kingdom: Plantae
- Clade: Tracheophytes
- Clade: Angiosperms
- Clade: Eudicots
- Order: Caryophyllales
- Family: Cactaceae
- Subfamily: Cactoideae
- Genus: Matucana
- Species: M. aureiflora

Binomial name
- Matucana aureiflora Friedrich Ritter, 1965

Synonyms
- Borzicactus aureiflorus (F.Ritter) Donald 1971; Submatucana aureiflora (F.Ritter) Backeb. 1966

= Matucana aureiflora =

Species of plant

Matucana aureiflora is a species of Matucana found in Peru.

== Description ==
Matucana aureiflora usually grows solitary with flat spherical, shiny dark green shoots up to 13 cm (5.1 in) in diameter. There are 11-27 blunt ribs made up of flat protuberances. The spines are firm, curved, yellow to tan yellow, darker at their base. The areoles have up to four central spines, which can also be missing, are 1.2 to 2.5 cm (0.47 to 0.98 in) long and 8 to 14 comb-shaped radial spines reach a length of 0.7 to 1.8 cm (0.28 to 0.71 in).

The broad, funnel-shaped, radial flowers are golden yellow, 3–4.5 cm (1.2–1.8 in) long and have a diameter of up to 4 cm (1.6 in). The fruits are egg-shaped, purplish and 1.4 cm (0.55 in) long with a 1 cm (0.39 in) diameter.

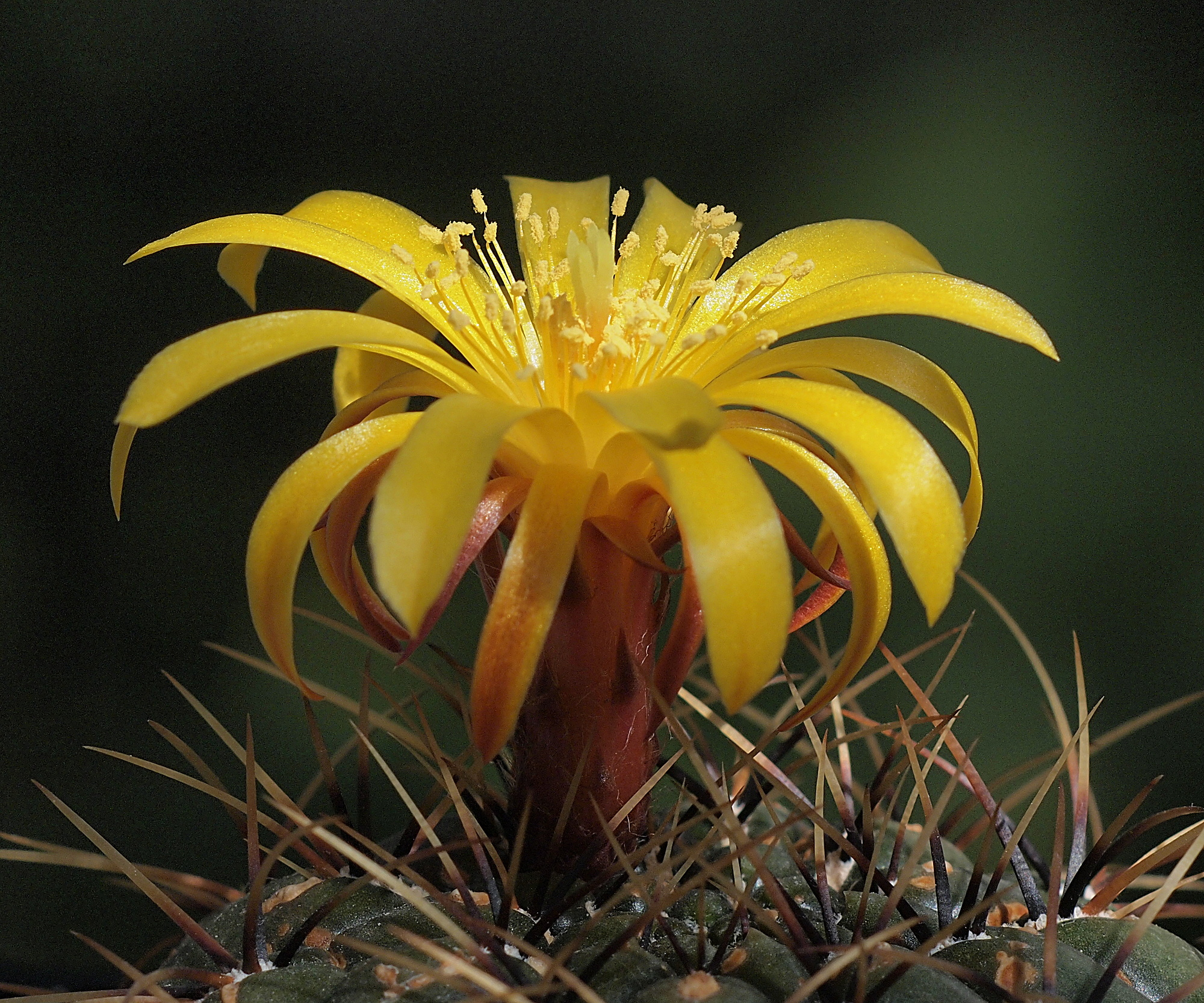

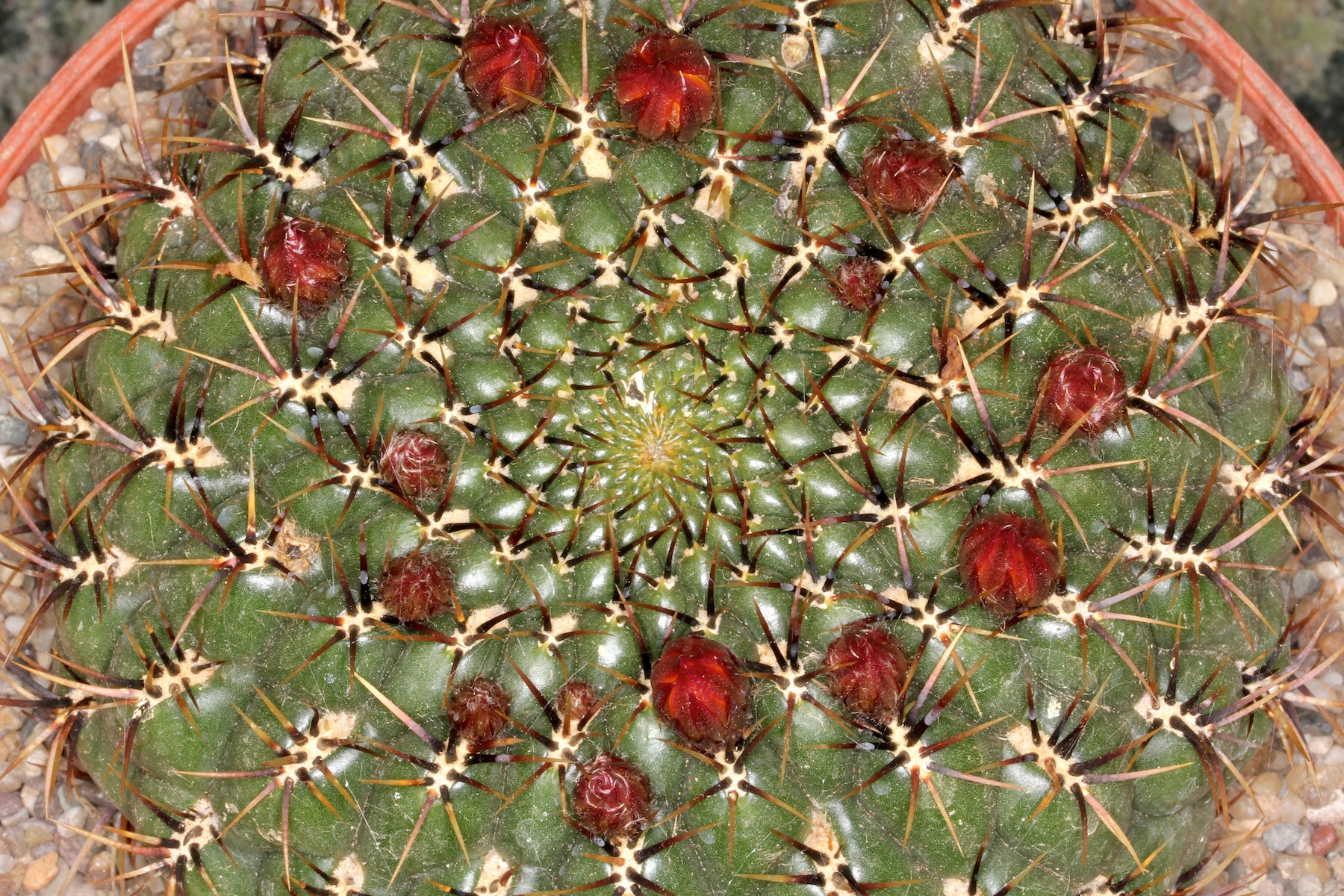

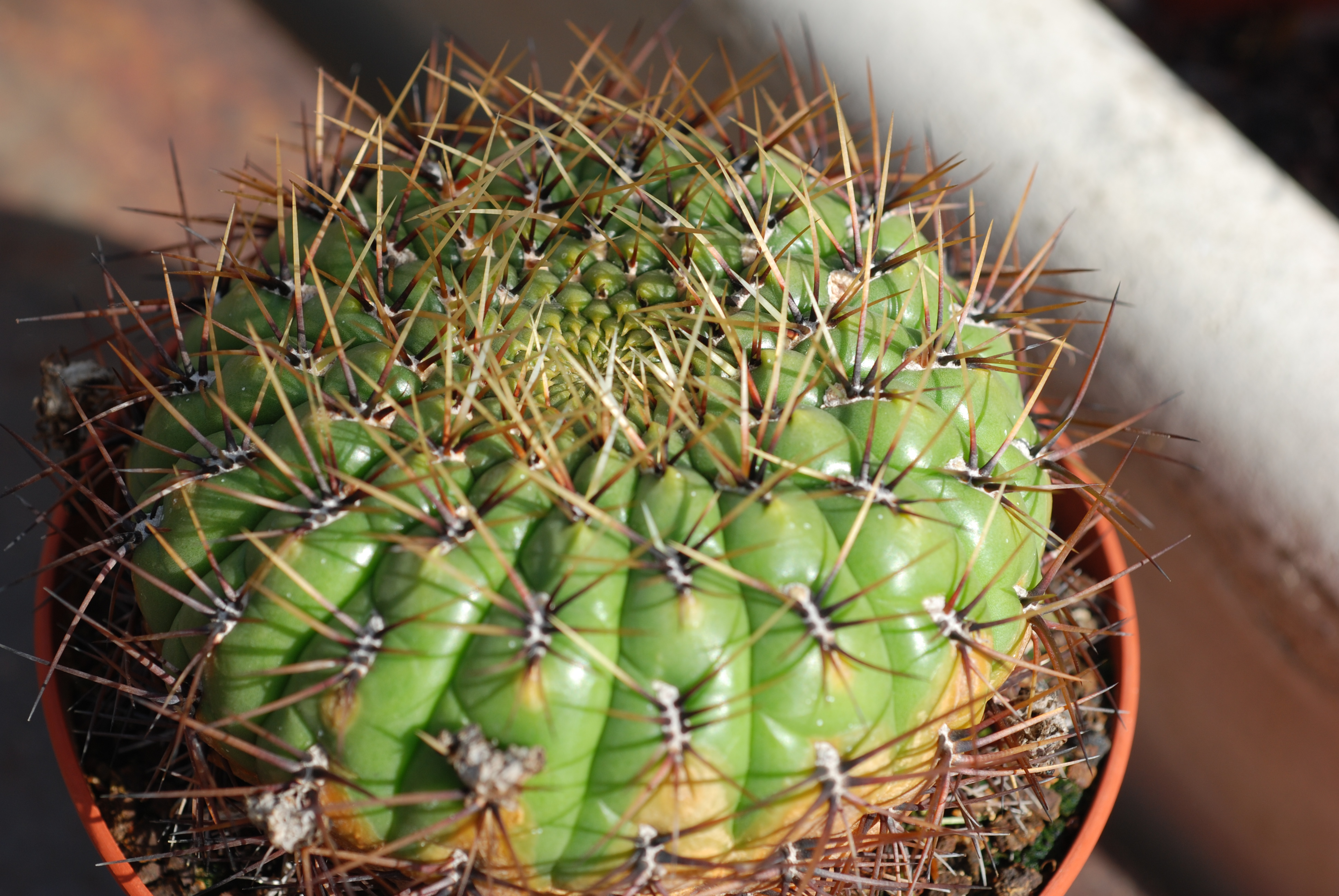

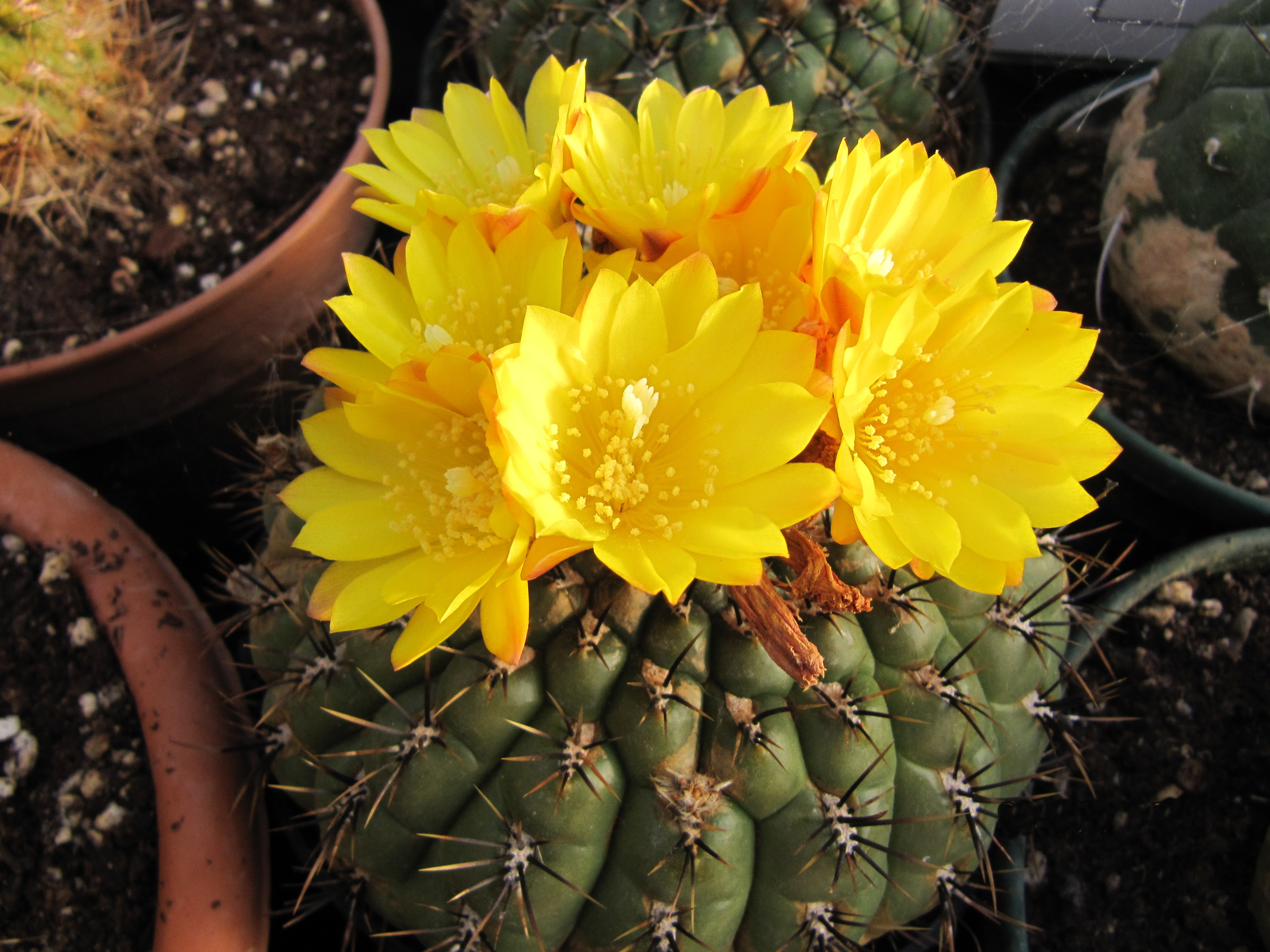

== Distribution ==
Matucana aureiflora is found in the Peruvian region of Cajamarca at altitudes of 2800 to 2900 meters. In the IUCN Red List of Threatened Species, the species is classified as "Critically Endangered (CR)".

== Taxonomy ==
The first description was in 1965 by Friedrich Ritter. Further nomenclature synonyms are Submatucana aureiflorus (F.Ritter) Backeb. (1966) and Borzicactus aureiflorus (F.Ritter) Donald (1971).
