= Matucana klopfensteinii =

Scientific classification
- Kingdom: Plantae
- Clade: Tracheophytes
- Clade: Angiosperms
- Clade: Eudicots
- Order: Caryophyllales
- Family: Cactaceae
- Subfamily: Cactoideae
- Genus: Matucana
- Species: M. klopfensteinii

Binomial name
- Matucana klopfensteinii Cieza & Pino

Species of cactus

Matucana klopfensteinii is a species of Matucana found in Peru.

== Description ==
Matucana klopfensteinii is globose and medium-green color, reaching a diameter of 8–13 cm and a height of 12–64 cm. As the plant matures, it develops 15-19 ribs. These ribs are segmented into many tubercles. Areoles are large with many trichomes covering the ribs. The plant features nine to fifteen radial spines, each extending up to 1-4.5 cm, accompanied by one to four central spine reaching a length of up to 1-5.5 cm. Spines are gray in color.

The flowers measures 6.8-9.0 cm in length, opens to a width of 4.8-6.5 cm, and red in color. The fruit, approximately 1.5–2 cm long and 1-1.3 cm wide, starts off green and undergoes a darkening process as it ages.

== Distribution ==
Plants are found growing in Cajamarca, Peru at elevations of 1150 to 2662 meters. Plants are found growing on rocky slopes along with Armatocereus rauhii subsp. balsasensis, Browningia pilleifera, Espostoa mirabilis, Peperomia dolabriformis, Peperomia selenophylla, Peperomia wolfgang-krahnii, Deuterocohnia longipetala, and Pereskia horrida.

== Taxonomy ==
The plant was first described by Nelson Cieza and Guillermo Pino in 2014 and named after Olivier Klopfenstein who first photographed the plant.
