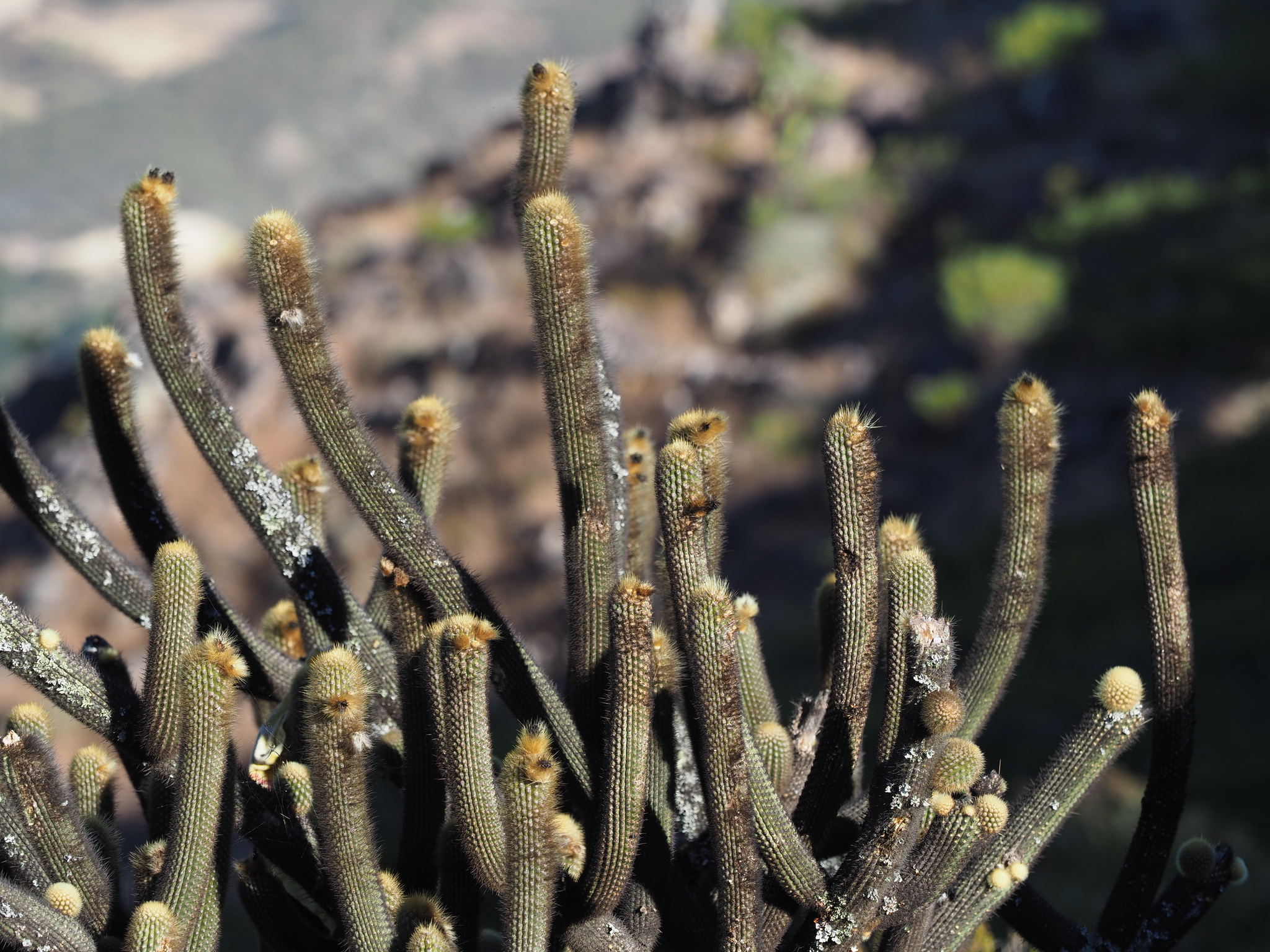

Conservation status
- Least Concern (IUCN 3.1)

Scientific classification
- Kingdom: Plantae
- Clade: Tracheophytes
- Clade: Angiosperms
- Clade: Eudicots
- Order: Caryophyllales
- Family: Cactaceae
- Subfamily: Cactoideae
- Genus: Lasiocereus
- Species: L. rupicola

Binomial name
- Lasiocereus rupicola F.Ritter, 1981

= Lasiocereus rupicola =

Species of plant

Lasiocereus rupicola is a species of succulent flowering plant in the genus Lasiocereus, within the family Cactaceae. It is endemic to the department of Cajamarca in northwestern Peru.

== Description ==
Lasiocereus rupicola is species of a spreading, treelike cactus that reaches 3 to 4 meters in height. It branches irregularly along the entire stem, from the base to the apex. The stems measure 4.5 to 7 cm thick, and have a dark green epidermis.

The stems have 18 to 21 ribs, which are 5 to 7 mm tall and approximately 5 mm wide. These ribs are almost parallel, and have narrow grooves on the lower part. Furthermore, they have tubercles with sunken notches that are approximately 1/4 to 1/3 of the height of the rib deep. On the tubercles are areoles, which are extended from the tubercles to the notches above them. The areoles lower on the stems, from which the spines grow, have a white felt-like covering, while the areoles on the upper part of the stems, from which the flowers grow, have an orange felt-like covering. On the upper stems, the areoles measure 5 to 6 mm in length and 4 to 5 mm in width and are separated by a distance of 4 to 6 mm. On young plants, the areoles are approximately half this size.

The areoles from which the flowers grow are somewhat larger, rounded, and with an orange felt-like covering. There is a ring of golden yellow bristles around the ovary. On the trunk of the plant, the areoles can be much larger, measuring over 2 cm in length and 1 cm in width with dagger-shaped spines that can reach 10 cm in length.

On the lower stems, each areole has approximately 20 radial spines. These are needle-shapes, straight, and point laterally outwards from the areole. They are light yellow and shiny, and measure 0.5 to 1 cm in length. There are also approximately 12 central spines, which are mostly similar to the radial spines, although often, one or two of the central spines may be more robust, darker in color, and pointed outwards, reaching 1 to 3 cm in length. In the parts of the plant from which flowers are borne, all of the spines are softer, longer, and more bristly. They are pointed outwards, and are golden-brown in color.

The flowers develop near the apex of the stem. They are actinomorphic, reaching approximately 5 cm in length, open at dusk, and close permanently at dawn. They are odorless. The ovary measures 5 to 6 mm in length and 1 to 1.7 cm in width in the upper part. The base of the ovary is blunt, and externally, it cannot be distinguished from the floral tube. It is green-gray in color, and is completely covered in thick white wool and a large number of flexible, straight, semi-extended bristles; these are of varying lengths, and are orange-brown in color. Furthermore, the ovary has numerous dry scales, which are black in color and very fine. They resemble hairs or awns, and reach approximately 1 cm in length.

The nectar chamber is tubular in shape, and measures approximately 4 mm in height and 7 to 11 mm in width. It has no internal projections and contains very little nectar. The bases of the stamen filaments partially conceal the nectar chamber. The upper part of the floral tube is also tubular in shape and measures approximately 2 cm in length and 1 cm in width. Externally, it is covered in a similar manner to the ovary. The lower scales appear similarly to those on the ovary, while the upper scales are somewhat longer, narrowly triangular, and ending in awns.

The filaments are white in color, and the anthers are off-white. The staminal insertions (the attachment points of the bases of the stamens) are very densely spaces around the margin of the floral tube. The style is white in color and has 8 extended white stigmal branches, which are approximately 7 mm long and situated among the anthers. The tepals measure 20 to 23 mm in length and approximately 5 mm in width. They are linear and spreading. The inner tepals are white, and are pointed at the end. The outer tepals are proximally white and become black towards the apex, ending in a sharp point.

The fruit is globose in shape and measures approximately 2.5 cm in diameter. The floral remnants remain firmly attached, and externally, the fruit resembles the ovary. Upon reaching maturity, the fruit opens widely from the base, forming lobes and partially separating from the plant, although it remains attached by spines and bristles. The funiculi (which are strongly fused and only slightly moist) dry out and harden, allowing the seeds to detach and fall.

The seeds are sac-shaped and black in color, measuring approximately 1.2 mm in length, 0.7 mm in width, and 0.5 mm in thickness. The surface is very finely tuberculate. The hilum is oval, white, and oblique.

== Distribution and habitat ==
Lasiocereus rupicola is native to the department of Cajamarca, in northwestern Peru. Specifically, it is found in southeastern Cajamarca, near San Marcos.

It grows in the dry, spiny scrublands characteristic of this region, at altitudes of 2000 to 2600 meters above sea level.

== Taxonomy ==
Lasiocereus rupicola was described by the German botanist Friedrich Ritter and published for the first time in the book Kakteen in Südamerika 4: 1478, in 1981.

Etymology

- Lasiocereus: the genus name is derived from the Greek word lasios (meaning "hairy" or "woolly") and the Latin word cereus (meaning "candle"), in reference to the hairy floral tubes and columnar stems of the species in this genus.
- rupicola: the specific epithet is derived from the Latin words rūpes (meaning "rock" or "cliff") and cŏla (meaning "inhabiting"), in reference to the rocky habitats in which this species grows.

On the IUCN Red List, Lasiocereus rupicola is classified as being of Least Concern, signifying that the species currently is at low risk of extinction. Although it has a small geographical distribution and therefore is uncommon, it does not face any known significant threats. However, the populations should be monitored, due to the fact that any negative impact could have serious ramifications for this species' survival.

== Cultivation ==
This species is cultivated primarily as an ornamentas. It may be propagated via seed or cuttings.
