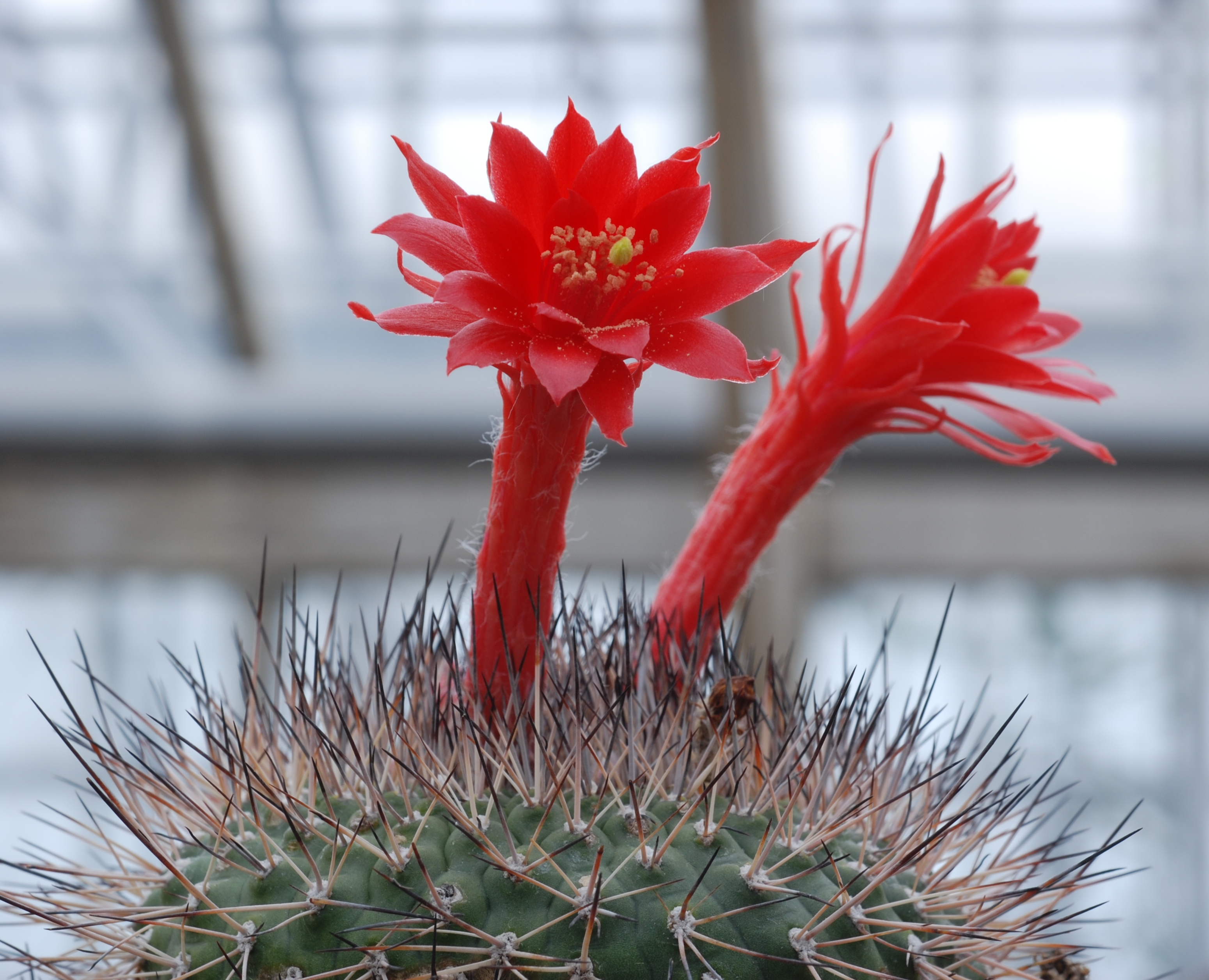

Conservation status
- Least Concern (IUCN 3.1)

Scientific classification
- Kingdom: Plantae
- Clade: Tracheophytes
- Clade: Angiosperms
- Clade: Eudicots
- Order: Caryophyllales
- Family: Cactaceae
- Subfamily: Cactoideae
- Genus: Matucana
- Species: M. formosa

Binomial name
- Matucana formosa F.Ritter 1963

Synonyms
- Borzicactus formosus (F.Ritter) Donald 1971; Loxanthocereus formosus (F.Ritter) Buxb. 1974; Submatucana formosa (F.Ritter) Backeb. 1963; Matucana formosa var. minor F.Ritter 1963; Submatucana formosa var. minor (F.Ritter) Backeb. 1963

= Matucana formosa =

Species of cactus

Matucana formosa is a species of Matucana found in Peru.

== Description ==
Matucana formosa usually grows with globular, gray-green shoots that branch out from the base and reaches stature heights of 10 to 15 cm (3.9 to 5.9 in) and the same diameter. There are 20-30 narrow, slightly bumpy ribs. Areoles have straight to slightly curved, stiff, dark brown spines have a darker tip and turn gray with age. The 1 to 4 central spines are 2 to 5 cm (0.79 to 1.97 in) and 6 to 11 radial spines growing up to 3 cm (1.2 in) long.

The crimson flowers have a curved flower tube and a crooked mouth. They are 8 to 10 cm (3.1 to 3.9 in) long and have a diameter of 4 to 7.5 cm (1.6 to 3.0 in). The length of the spherical, green and red fruits is 1.5 cm (0.59 in). Their diameter is 1 cm (0.39 in).

== Distribution ==
Matucana formosa is distributed in the Peruvian departments of La Libertad, Cajamarca and Amazonas in the valley of the Río Marañón at altitudes of 800 to 1100 meters.

== Taxonomy ==
The first description was in 1963 by Friedrich Ritter. Nomenclature synonyms are Submatucana formosa (F.Ritter) Backeb. (1963), Borzicactus formosus (F.Ritter) Donald (1971) and Loxanthocereus formosus (F.Ritter) Buxb. (1974).
