= Matucana hoxeyi =

Scientific classification
- Kingdom: Plantae
- Clade: Tracheophytes
- Clade: Angiosperms
- Clade: Eudicots
- Order: Caryophyllales
- Family: Cactaceae
- Subfamily: Cactoideae
- Genus: Matucana
- Species: M. hoxeyi

Binomial name
- Matucana hoxeyi (G.J.Charles) G.J.Charles

Synonyms
- Matucana paucicostata subsp. hoxeyi G.J.Charles 2010

Species of cactus

Matucana hoxeyi is a species of cactus in the genus Matucana, native to Peru.

== Description ==
Matucana hoxeyi is identified by its pale yellow-green stems, glaucous, with a diameter of 12 cm (4.7 in) and reaching heights of up to 30 cm (12 in). The plant typically grows either as a single specimen or in clusters. Its spines, initially golden but transitioning to grey, are straight to slightly curved. The plant features up to 10 radial spines, measuring up to 30 mm (1.2 in) in length, and a central spine that can reach 40 mm (1.6 in). The flowers of Matucana hoxeyi measure approximately 65 mm (2.6 in) in length and red-orange with a subtle hint of violet. The seeds are dark brown and measure 2.2 mm × 2.0 mm (0.087 in × 0.079 in).

== Distribution ==
This species is found in the valley of the Río Rupac, Peru at elevations of 1800 to 2350 meters. Plants are found growing around Matucana haynii subsp. myriacantha.

== Taxonomy ==
The plant was first discovered by cactus collector Paul Hoxey in December 2001. The plant was later described in 2010 by Graham Charles in Quepo as Matucana paucicostata subsp. hoxeyi
