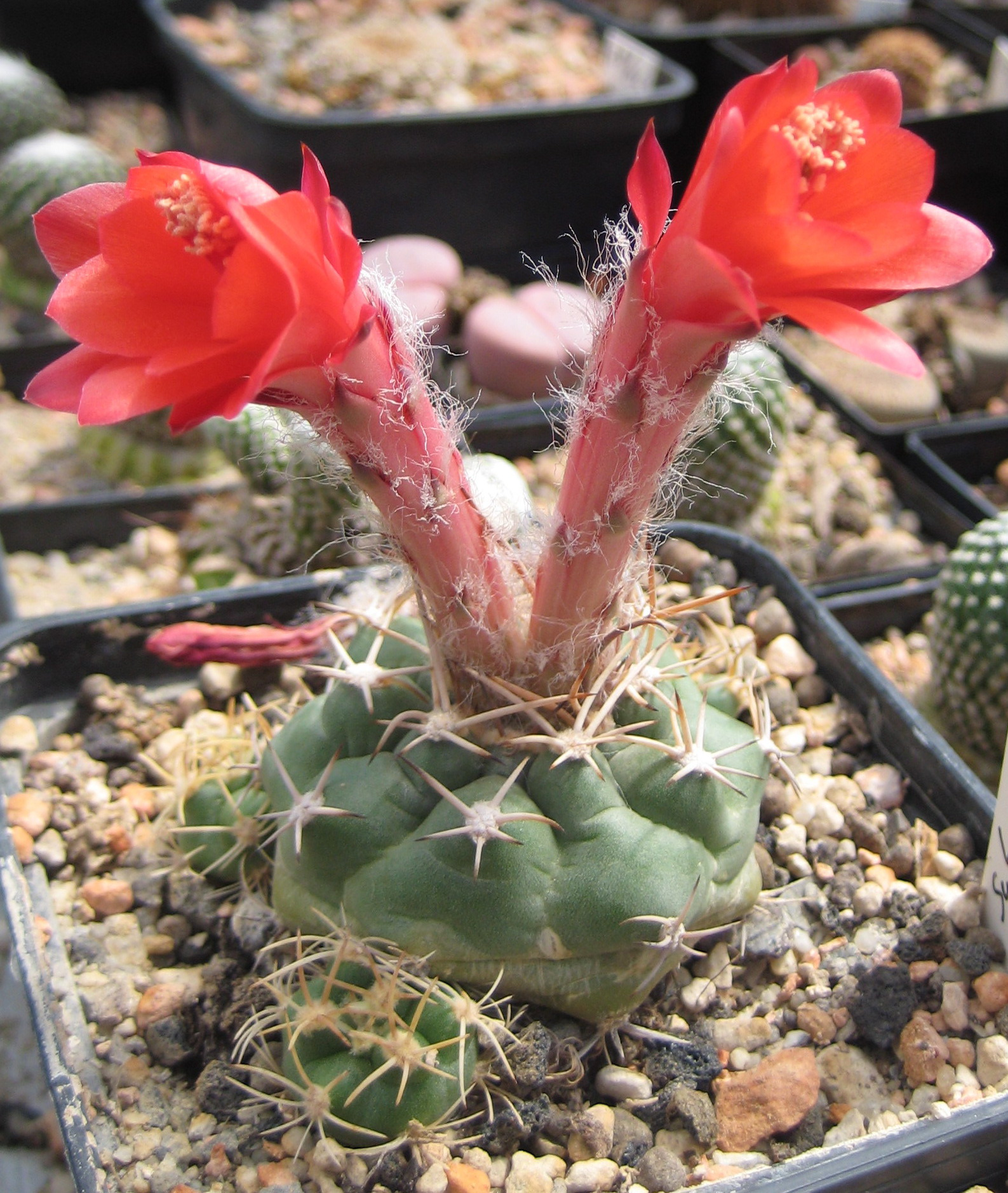
- Matucana paucicostata

Scientific classification
- Kingdom: Plantae
- Clade: Tracheophytes
- Clade: Angiosperms
- Clade: Eudicots
- Order: Caryophyllales
- Family: Cactaceae
- Subfamily: Cactoideae
- Tribe: Cereeae
- Subtribe: Trichocereinae
- Genus: Matucana; Britton & Rose

Type species
- Matucana haynii

Species
- See text

Synonyms
- Anhaloniopsis (Buxb.) Mottram 2014; Eomatucana F.Ritter 1965; Submatucana Backeb. 1959; Oroya Britton & Rose 1922

= Matucana =

Genus of cacti

Matucana is a genus of cacti (family Cactaceae), containing approximately 20 species of mostly globular plants. The genus is known only from Peru, mostly along the Marañón River.

Some species are endangered due to collection for the specialist market.

== Description ==
Plants within this genus may be identified by the distinctive structure of their fruits, which are marked by vertical splits that release their seeds upon maturity. The overall body shape, spination, offset production, and preferred habitat exhibit considerable variability, mirroring the diverse nature of the flowers within the genus. Species of Matucana have low, globose or shortly cylindrical bodies, either solitary or clustering. The flowers are subapical, usually more or less zygomorphic, diurnal, of various colours, but usually red, yellow or pink. However, a few species, notably M. oreodoxa, have actinomorphic flowers and were placed in a separate genus - Eomatucana - by F. Ritter. They are reported to flower at a young age.

== Taxonomy ==
The first species was discovered near the town of Matucana and described as Echinocactus haynii by Christoph Friedrich Otto in 1849. The genus Matucana was erected by Nathaniel Lord Britton and Joseph Nelson Rose in 1922 to differentiate it from the diverse Echinocactus genus.

== Species ==
As of October 2025, the following species were accepted:

Image	Scientific name	Distribution
	Matucana aurantiaca (Vaupel) Buxb.	Peru.
	Matucana aureiflora F.Ritter	Peru.
	Matucana borchersii (Boed.) G.J.Charles	Peru (Ancash)
	Matucana charlesiorum Hoxey	Peru
	Matucana chrysacantha Hoxey & G.J.Charles	Peru
	Matucana formosa F.Ritter	Peru.
	Matucana gigantea G.J.Charles	Peru
	Matucana haynii (Otto ex Salm-Dyck) Britton & Rose	Peru.
	Matucana hoxeyi (G.J.Charles) G.J.Charles	Peru.
	Matucana huagalensis (Donald & A.B.Lau) Bregmann, Meerst., Melis & Pullen	Peru.
	Matucana intertexta F.Ritter	Peru.
	Matucana klopfensteinii Cieza & Pino	Peru (Cajamarca).
	Matucana krahnii (Donald) Bregmann	Peru.
	Matucana madisoniorum (Hutchison) G.D.Rowley	Peru.
	Matucana oreodoxa (F.Ritter) Slaba	Peru.
	Matucana ostolazae (Pino & L.E.Alomía) Pino & L.E.Alomía	Peru (Junín)
	Matucana paucicostata F.Ritter	Peru.
	Matucana peruviana (K.Schum.) G.J.Charles	Peru (Cuzco, Junin)
	Matucana pughii G.J.Charles	Peru.
	Matucana pujupatii (Donald & A.B.Lau) Bregmann	Peru.
	Matucana rebutiiflora G.J.Charles	Peru.
	Matucana ritteri Buining	Peru.
	Matucana roseiflora (G.J.Charles) G.J.Charles & Hoxey	Peru.
	Matucana tuberculata (Donald) Bregman, Meerst., Melis & A.B.Pullen	Peru.
	Matucana weberbaueri (Vaupel) Backeb.	Peru.

== Cultivation ==
All members of the genus cannot tolerate too much moisture so that it is recommended that they be watered only during their growing season and when the substrate is dry. They risk losing their roots if they are not kept warm through the winter. Members of Matucana grow quickly and may be grown from seed.
