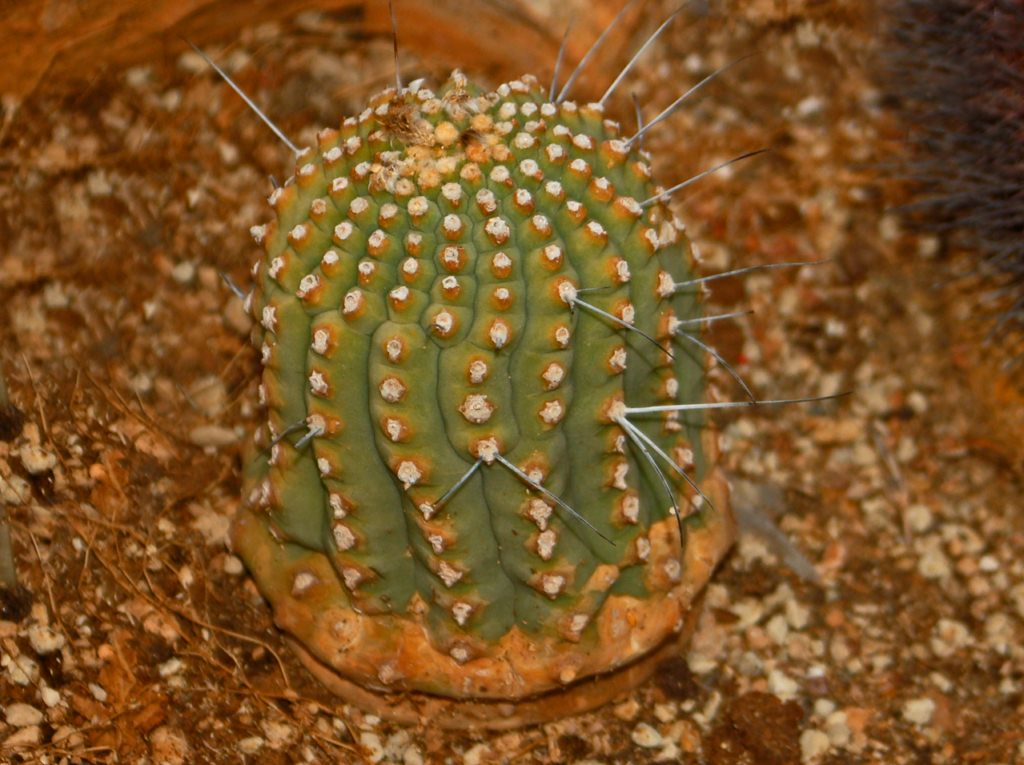
- Matucana paucicostata at the botanical garden of Villa Durazzo-Pallavicini, Genova Pegli

Scientific classification
- Kingdom: Plantae
- Clade: Embryophytes
- Clade: Tracheophytes
- Clade: Angiosperms
- Clade: Eudicots
- Order: Caryophyllales
- Family: Cactaceae
- Subfamily: Cactoideae
- Genus: Matucana
- Species: M. paucicostata

Binomial name
- Matucana paucicostata F.Ritter 1963

Synonyms
- Submatucana paucicostata (F.Ritter) Backeb. (1963); Borzicactus paucicostatus (F.Ritter) Donald (1971)'

= Matucana paucicostata =

Species of plant

Matucana paucicostata is a cactus in the genus Matucana of the family Cactaceae.

== Description ==
Matucana paucicostata is a clustering pant, dark gray-green, spherical when young, short cylindrical with age and has a diameter of 4–7 centimetres (1.6–2.8 in) and a height of 7–15 centimetres (2.8–5.9 in). It has seven to eleven broad, straight ribs. The spines are curved, somewhat flexible, reddish-brown turn gray with age. A single central spine, which can also be missing is up to 3 centimetres (1.2 in) and while the four to eight radial spines are 0.5 to 3 centimetres (0.20 to 1.18 in) long.

The long-necked, purplish pink flowers are up to 6 inches long and have a diameter of 3 inches. The green fruit reaches a diameter of 11 millimetres (0.43 in)

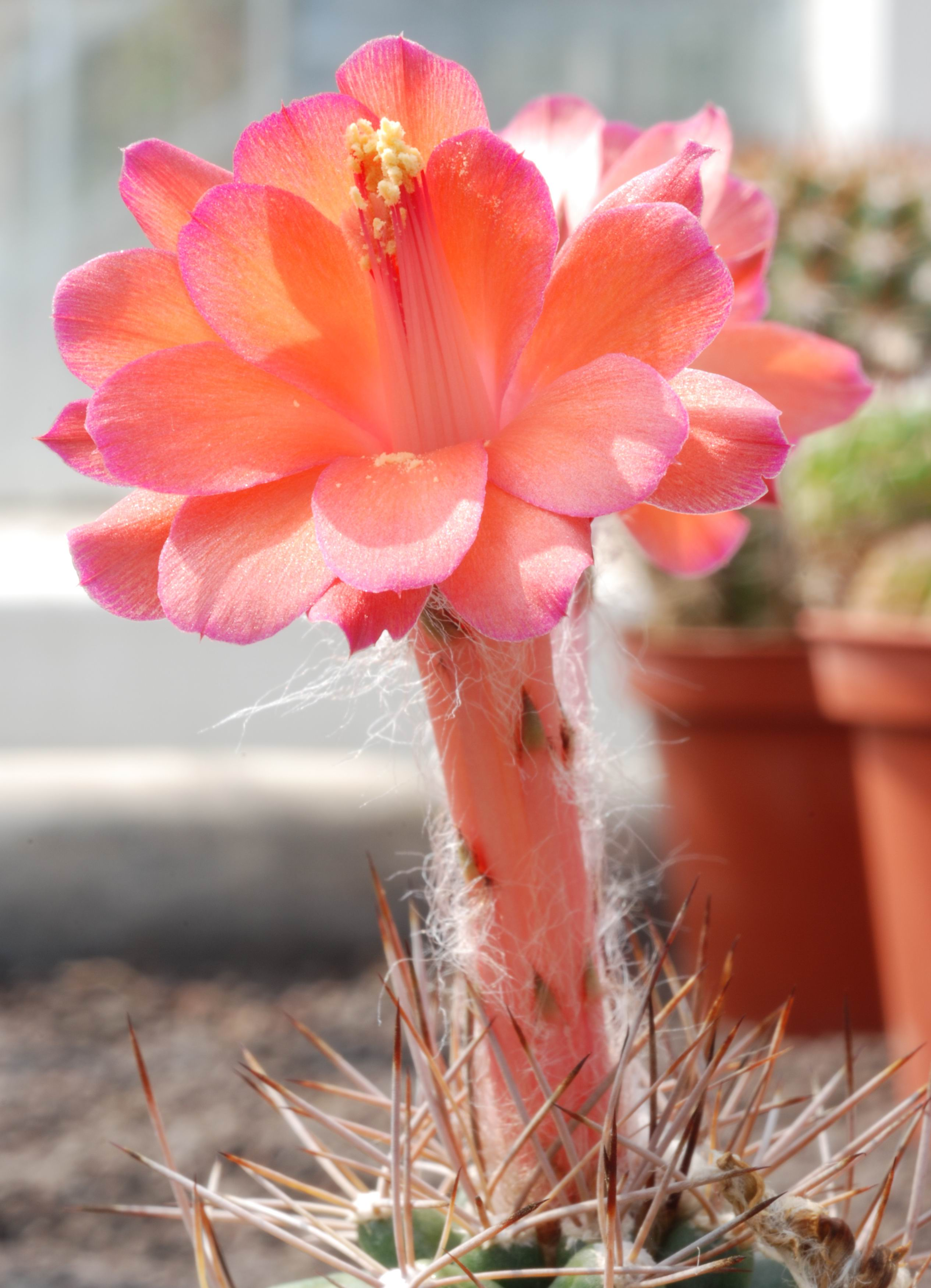
Flower of Matucana paucicortata

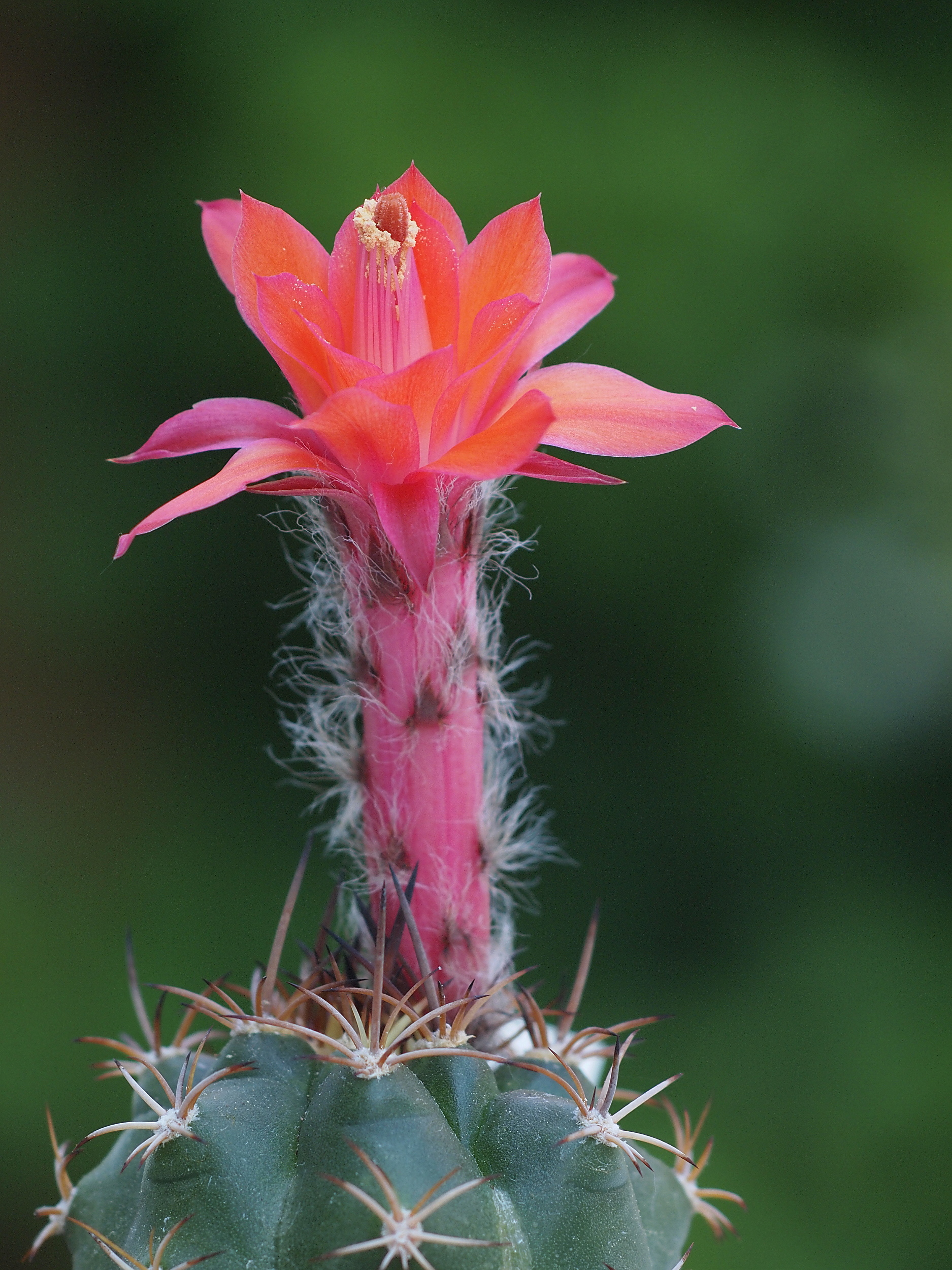
Flower

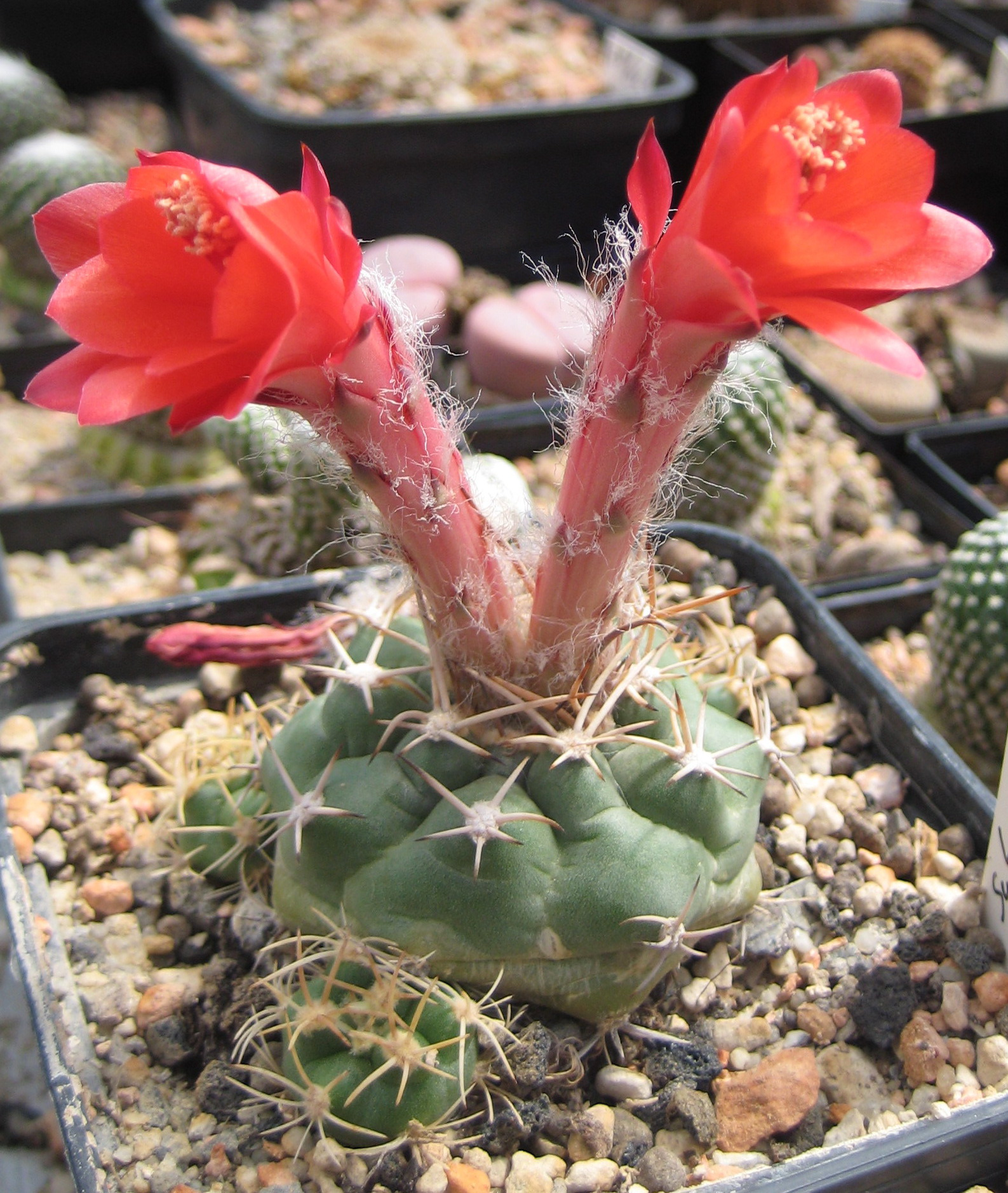
Blooming plant

== Distribution ==
This species is native to the Peruvian region of Ancash, in the valleys of the Río Puchca, Mosna River, Río Huari and Río Marañón. It is widespread at an altitude of 1,800–2,800 metres (5,900–9,200 ft) above sea level.

== Taxonomy ==
The first description was in 1963 by Friedrich Ritter. The epithet paucicostata derives from the Latin paucicostatus, meaning having few ribs. Nomenclature synonyms are Submatucana paucicostata (F.Ritter) Backeb. (1963) and Borzicactus paucicostatus (F.Ritter) Donald (1971).
