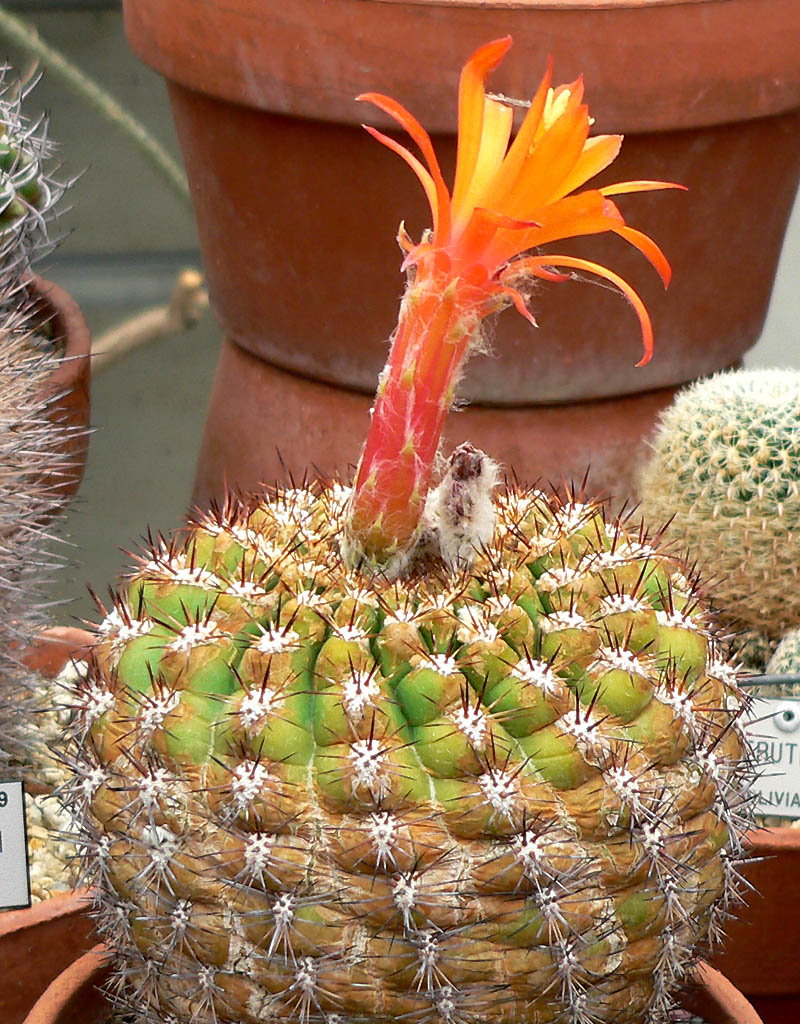

Conservation status
- Data Deficient (IUCN 2.3)

Scientific classification
- Kingdom: Plantae
- Clade: Tracheophytes
- Clade: Angiosperms
- Clade: Eudicots
- Order: Caryophyllales
- Family: Cactaceae
- Subfamily: Cactoideae
- Genus: Matucana
- Species: M. intertexta

Binomial name
- Matucana intertexta F.Ritter

Synonyms
- List: Borzicactus intertextus (F.Ritter) Donald; Borzicactus intertextus var. celendinensis (F.Ritter) Donald; Matucana celendinensis F.Ritter; Matucana intertexta var. celendinensis (F.Ritter) Bregman, Meerst., Melis & A.B.Pullen; Submatucana intertexta (F.Ritter) Backeb.

= Matucana intertexta =

Species of plant in the genus Matucana

Matucana intertexta is a species of cactus in the genus Matucana, native to Peru. It has gained the Royal Horticultural Society's Award of Garden Merit.

== Description ==
Matucana intertexta usually grows solitary with globular to broadly cylindrical, green shoots and reaches heights of growth of up to 30 cm (12 in) with a diameter of 7 to 18 cm (2.8 to 7.1 in). There are 14 - 25 blunt, flattened tubercles ribs present. The white, straight or slightly curved, protruding to slightly splaying spines darken with age. There are initially up to 20 spines, two to five central spines with a length of 2 to 4 cm (0.79 to 1.57 in) and ten to 25 radial spines with a length of 0.7 to 2 cm (0.28 to 0.79 in).

The lopsided, light orange to vermilion and scarlet flowers are 7 to 10.5 cm (2.8 to 4.1 in) long and have a diameter of 3.5 to 8 cm (1.4 to 3.1 in). Their bracts are edged with purple. The spherical, green fruits reach a diameter of 1 to 1.8 cm (0.39 to 0.71 in).

== Subspecies ==
The following subspecies are currently accepted:

- Matucana intertexta subsp. intertexta
- Matucana intertexta subsp. jankei Cieza & Pino

== Distribution ==
Matucana intertexta is distributed in the Peruvian region of Cajamarca at altitudes of 1500 to 2300 meters.

== Taxonomy ==
The first description was in 1963 by Friedrich Ritter. Nomenclature synonyms are Submatucana intertexta (F.Ritter) Backeb. (1963) and Borzicactus intertextus (F.Ritter) Donald (1971).
