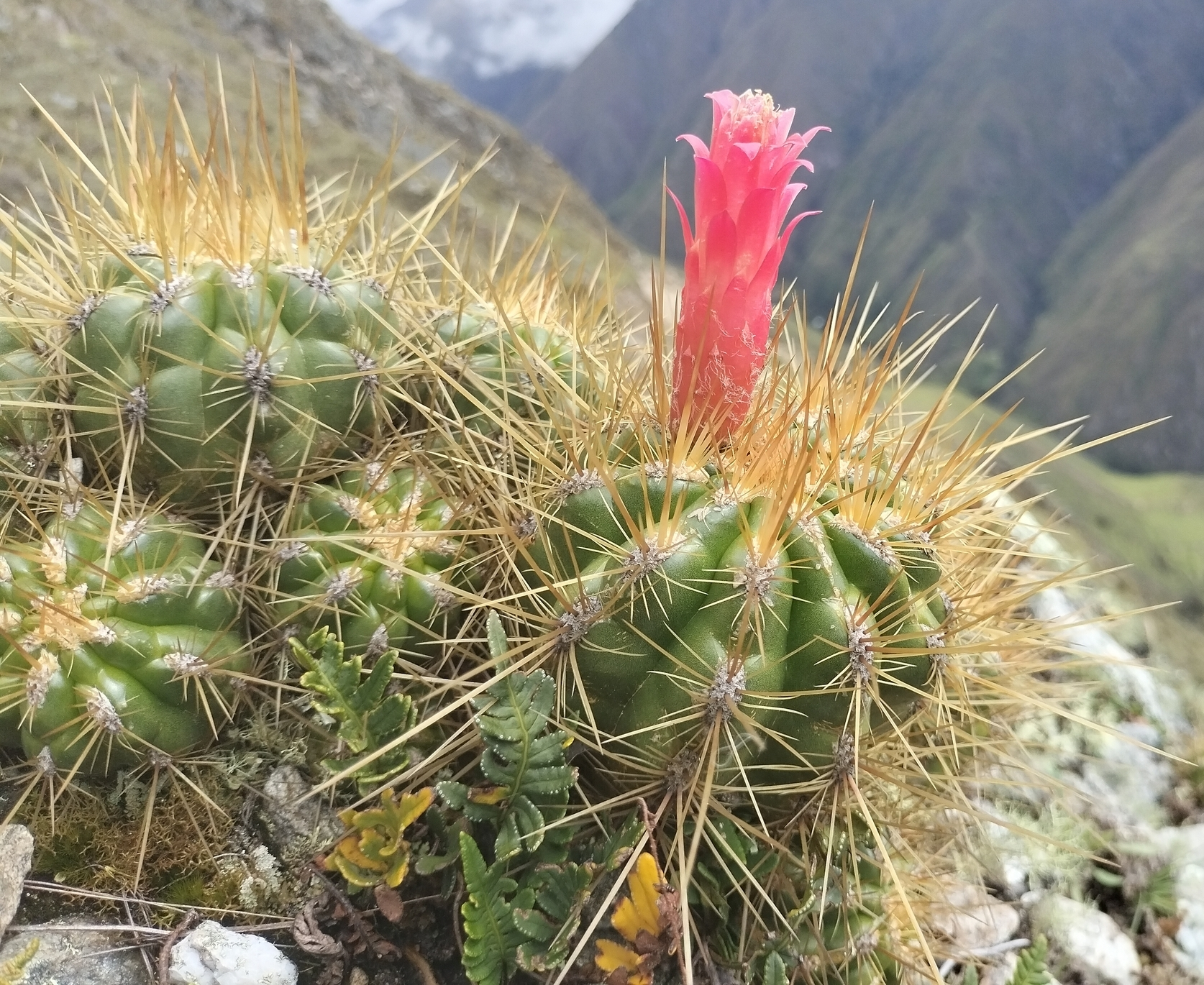

Scientific classification
- Kingdom: Plantae
- Clade: Tracheophytes
- Clade: Angiosperms
- Clade: Eudicots
- Order: Caryophyllales
- Family: Cactaceae
- Subfamily: Cactoideae
- Genus: Matucana
- Species: M. ostolazae

Binomial name
- Matucana ostolazae (Pino & L.E.Alomía) Pino & L.E.Alomía 2024

Synonyms
- Perucactus ostolazae Pino & L.E.Alomía 2022

= Matucana ostolazae =

Species of cactus

Matucana ostolazae is a species of Matucana found in Peru.

== Distribution ==
Plants are found growing in on rocky slopes and clay soil near the Ulcumayo River in the Ulcumayo Valley of the Junín province of Peru at elevations between 3050 and 3950 meters. Plants are found growing along Austrocylindropuntia subulata, Austrocylindropuntia floccosa, and Crassula connata.

== Taxonomy ==
The species was first seen and collected in July 2021. Flowers were observed in May 2022 and later described as Perucactus ostolazae after the region it was discovered in and Carlos Ostolaza, a botanist and surgeon in Peru.
