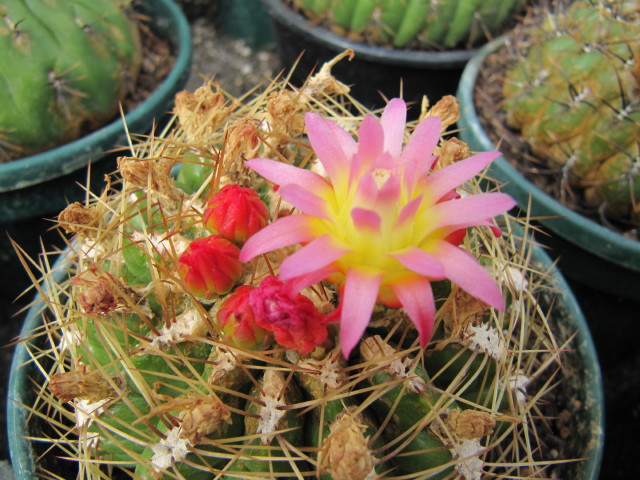

Conservation status
- Endangered (IUCN 3.1)

Scientific classification
- Kingdom: Plantae
- Clade: Tracheophytes
- Clade: Angiosperms
- Clade: Eudicots
- Order: Caryophyllales
- Family: Cactaceae
- Subfamily: Cactoideae
- Genus: Matucana
- Species: M. peruviana

Binomial name
- Matucana peruviana (K.Schum.) G.J.Charles 2024

Synonyms
- Echinocactus peruvianus K.Schum. 1903; Echinopsis urbis-regum Molinari & Mayta (2015; Oroya baumannii Kníže 1969; Oroya baumannii var. rubrispina Kníže 1968; Oroya gibbosa F.Ritter in Kakteen Südamerika 4: 1512 (1981; Oroya gibbosa var. citriflora Kníže 1969 not validly publ; Oroya laxiareolata Rauh & Backeb. in C.Backeberg1956 publ. 1957; Oroya laxiareolata var. pluricentralis Backeb. 1963; Oroya neoperuviana Backeb. in C.Backeberg & F.M.Knuth 1936; Oroya neoperuviana var. depressa Rauh & Backeb. 1956 publ. 1957; Oroya neoperuviana var. ferruginea Rauh & Backeb. 1956 publ. 1957; Oroya peruviana var. baumannii (Kníže) Slaba 1985; Oroya peruviana var. citriflora (Kníže) Slaba 1985; Oroya peruviana var. conaikensis Donald & A.B.Lau 1970; Oroya peruviana var. depressa (Rauh & Backeb.) Slaba 1985; Oroya peruviana var. neoperuviana (Backeb.) Slaba 1985; Oroya peruviana var. pluricentralis (Backeb.) F.Ritter 1981), no full basionym ref; Oroya subocculta Rauh & Backeb. in C.Backeberg 1956 publ. 1957; Oroya subocculta var. albispina Rauh & Backeb. 1956 publ. 1957; Oroya subocculta var. fusca Rauh & Backeb. 1956 publ. 1957; Oroya subocculta var. laxiareolata (Rauh & Backeb.) Slaba 1985; Oroya subocculta var. pluricentralis (Backeb.) Slaba 1985; Oroya peruviana (K.Schum.) Britton & Rose 1922

= Matucana peruviana =

Species of plants

Matucana peruviana is a species of cacti (family Cactaceae), originating from Peru.

== Description ==
Matucana peruviana usually grows individually with depressed, spherical to short cylindrical, blue-green shoots that reach heights of 5 to 20 cm (2.0 to 7.9 in) with diameters of 10 to 14 cm (3.9 to 5.5 in). There are 12 to 30 rounded, notched and cusped ribs. The white areoles are greatly elongated. The yellowish to reddish brown to dark brown spines are difficult to distinguish between central and peripheral spines. The 1 to 3 central spines are protruding and up to 2 cm (0.79 in) long. The 15 to 24 radial spines arranged in a comb shape are up to 1.5 cm (0.59 in) long.

The flowers often appear densely packed near the shoot tip from young areoles. They are carmine red with a yellowish base and yellowish inside. The flowers are up to 3 cm (1.2 in) long and reach a diameter of 2.2 cm (0.87 in). The short, club-shaped fruits are reddish brown.

== Distribution ==
Matucana peruviana is widespread in the Peruvian regions of Junín, Huancavelica, Ayacucho, Apurímac, and maybe Cusco at altitudes of 3000 to 4300 meters.

== Taxonomy ==
The first description as Echinocactus peruvianus was published in 1903 by Karl Moritz Schumann. Nathaniel Lord Britton and Joseph Nelson Rose placed it in the genus Oroya in 1922.
