= Matucana roseiflora =

Scientific classification
- Kingdom: Plantae
- Clade: Tracheophytes
- Clade: Angiosperms
- Clade: Eudicots
- Order: Caryophyllales
- Family: Cactaceae
- Subfamily: Cactoideae
- Genus: Matucana
- Species: M. roseiflora

Binomial name
- Matucana roseiflora (G.J.Charles) G.J.Charles & Hoxey

Species of cactus

Matucana roseiflora is a species of Matucana found in Peru. These are the non zygomorphic flowered Matucana's Ritter erected a subgenus for called Incaica. The most common in cultivation at the moment being Matucana aureiflora. Unlike most of the zygomorphic flowered Matucana's which are hummingbird pollinated, these are insect pollinated, having a normal symmetrical rotate flower.
