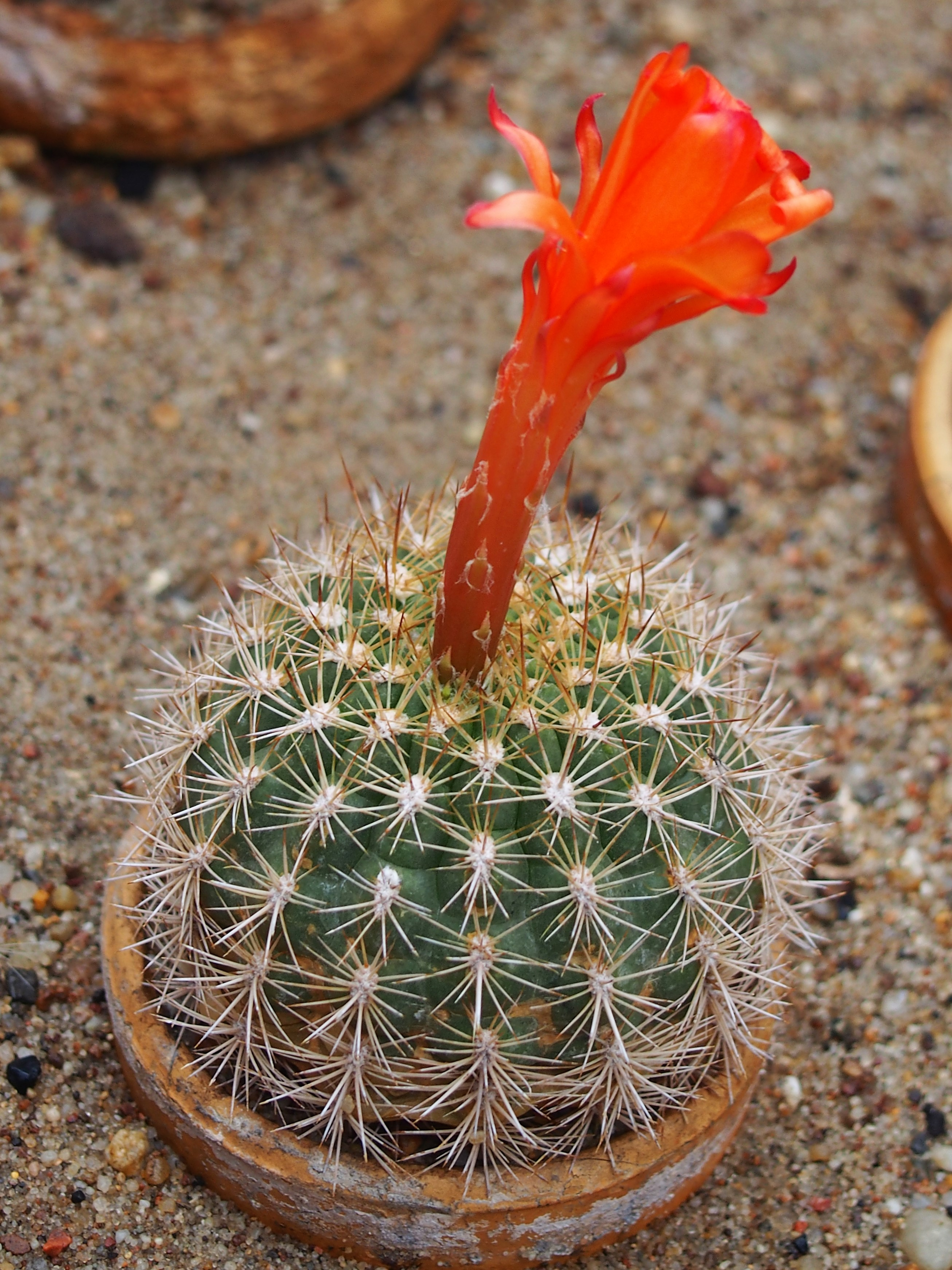

Conservation status
- Critically Endangered (IUCN 2.3)

Scientific classification
- Kingdom: Plantae
- Clade: Tracheophytes
- Clade: Angiosperms
- Clade: Eudicots
- Order: Caryophyllales
- Family: Cactaceae
- Subfamily: Cactoideae
- Genus: Matucana
- Species: M. huagalensis

Binomial name
- Matucana huagalensis (Donald & A.B.Lau) Bregman, Meerst., Melis & A.B.Pullen 1988

Synonyms
- Borzicactus huagalensis Donald & A.Lau 1970

= Matucana huagalensis =

Species of plant

Matucana huagalensis is a species of Matucana found in Peru.

== Description ==
Matucana huagalensis usually grows solitary and only rarely sprouts with flattened, spherical to broadly cylindrical, green shoots and reaches heights of up to 25 cm (9.8 in) with a diameter of 15 cm (5.9 in). There are about 18 sharp-edged, tuberous ribs. Of the white to light brown spines, some have a darker tip. The three to four central spines are up to 4 cm (1.6 in), the 18 to 20 radial spines 1 to 2 cm (0.39 to 0.79 in) long.

The slightly crooked flowers are light pink to almost white. They are up to 10 cm (3.9 in) long. The spherical fruits are green.

== Distribution ==
Matucana huagalensis is located in the Peruvian Department of Cajamarca near the confluence of the Río Marañón and Río Crisnejas at an altitude of 2000 to 2500 meters.

== Taxonomy ==
The first description as Borzicactus huagalensis was in 1970 by John Donald Donald and Alfred Bernhard Lau. The specific epithet huagalensis refers to the occurrence of the species on the Hacienda Hugal. Rob Bregman and his co-authors placed the species in the genus Matucana in 1988. A nomenclature synonym is Submatucana huagalensis (Donald & A.B.Lau) hort. (no year, nom. invalid. ICBN article 29.1).
