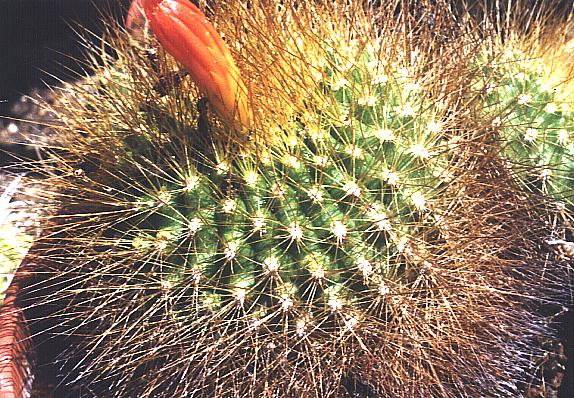

Conservation status
- Least Concern (IUCN 3.1)

Scientific classification
- Kingdom: Plantae
- Clade: Tracheophytes
- Clade: Angiosperms
- Clade: Eudicots
- Order: Caryophyllales
- Family: Cactaceae
- Subfamily: Cactoideae
- Genus: Matucana
- Species: M. aurantiaca

Binomial name
- Matucana aurantiaca (Vaupel) Buxb.

Synonyms
- Echinocactus aurantiacus Vaupel (basionym)

= Matucana aurantiaca =

Species of plant

Matucana aurantiaca (common name, orange matucana) is a species of flowering plant in the cactus family Cactaceae. It grows in the Cajamarca and La Libertad regions of Peru. It is considered to have a stable population and a wide range with no threats.

== Description ==
Matucana aurantiaca grows in clusters of ribbed or solitary and rarely branches from the base, spiny spheres or cylinders reaching about 15–35 cm (5.9–13.8 in) (rarely up to 50 cm (20 in)) in height with a diameter of 15 cm (5.9 in). The spherical to broadly cylindrical, green to dark green shoots reach heights of growth of up to There are 13 to 19 broad ribs made up of hexagonal protuberances. The distinct, straight, yellowish brown spines turn gray with age. The approximately nine central spines are 2 to 7 cm (0.79 to 2.76 in) long. The twelve to 20 radial spines have a length of 0.5 to 4 cm (0.20 to 1.57 in). It bears orange funnel-shaped flowers in summer. The Latin specific epithet aurantiaca means "orange". The orange-red to red flowers are 7 to 9 cm (2.8 to 3.5 in) long and reach a diameter of 5 to 7 cm (2.0 to 2.8 in). Your bracts are edged purple, the flower mouth is slightly crooked to straight. The diameter of the spherical green fruits is up to 2 cm (0.79 in).

=== Subspecies ===
| Image | Subspecies | Description | Distribution |
|---|---|---|---|
| | Matucana aurantiaca subsp. aurantiaca | | Cajamarca and La Libertad, Peru. |
| | Matucana aurantiaca subsp. currundayensis (F.Ritter) Mottram | | La Libertad, Peru. |
| | Matucana aurantiaca subsp. fruticosa (F.Ritter) Mottram | | Cajamarca, Peru. |
| | Matucana aurantiaca subsp. hastifera (F.Ritter) Mottram | | Peru. |
| | Matucana aurantiaca subsp. polzii (Diers, Donald & Zecher) Mottram | | Huánuco, Peru. |

== Distribution ==
Matucana aurantiaca is distributed in the Peruvian regions of Ancash, La Libertad, Cajamarca and possibly Piura at altitudes of 2000 to 3700 meters.

== Taxonomy ==
The plant was first described as Echinocactus aurantiacus was in 1913 by Friedrich Karl Johann Vaupel. Franz Buxbaum placed the species in the genus Matucana in 1973. Other nomenclature synonyms are Arequipa aurantiaca (Vaupel) Werderm. (1939), Borzicactus aurantiacus (Vaupel) Kimnach & Hutchison (1957) and Submatucana aurantiaca (Vaupel) Backeb. (1959).

== Cultivation ==
In temperate areas this plant requires some protection from rain and frost, so is best grown under glass in an unheated greenhouse which receives plenty of sun. It is kept dry through the winter, but watered and fed during the growing season, from spring to autumn. In cultivation in the United Kingdom it has been given the Royal Horticultural Society's Award of Garden Merit.
