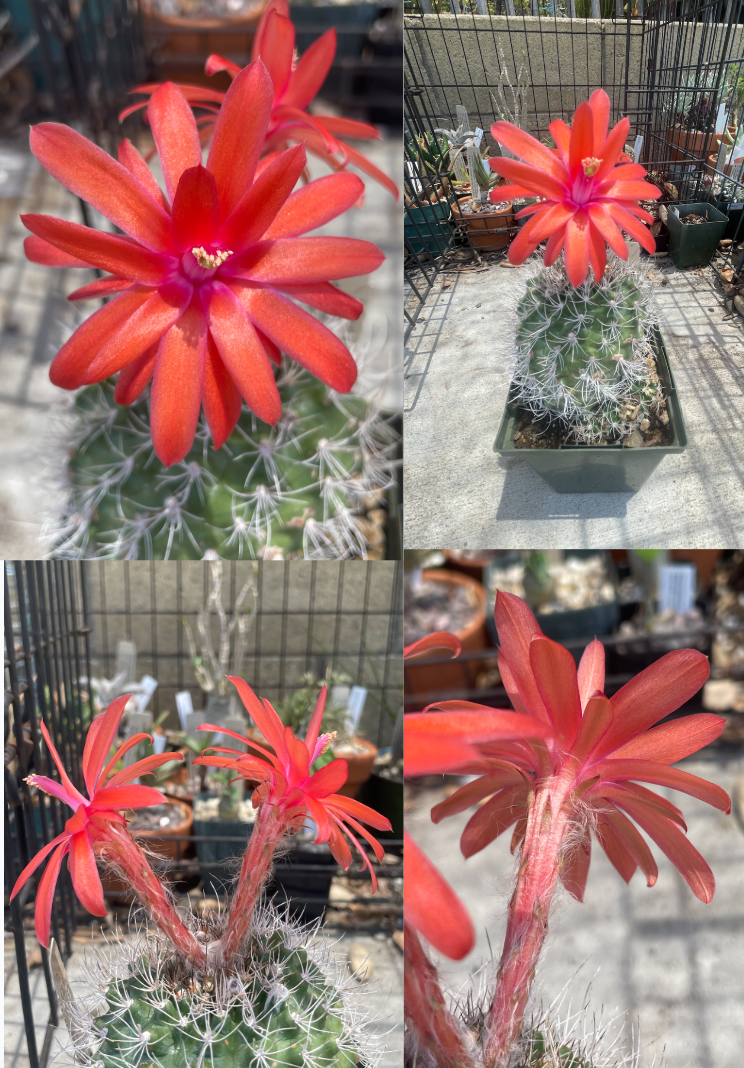

Conservation status
- Vulnerable (IUCN 3.1)

Scientific classification
- Kingdom: Plantae
- Clade: Tracheophytes
- Clade: Angiosperms
- Clade: Eudicots
- Order: Caryophyllales
- Family: Cactaceae
- Subfamily: Cactoideae
- Genus: Matucana
- Species: M. krahnii

Binomial name
- Matucana krahnii (Donald) Bregman 1986

Synonyms
- Borzicactus krahnii Donald 1979; Matucana calliantha F.Ritter 1981; Matucana calliantha var. prolifera F.Ritter 1981

= Matucana krahnii =

Species of plant

Matucana krahnii is a species of Matucana found in Peru.

== Description ==
Matucana krahnii usually grows solitary and only rarely sprouts with flattened spherical to short cylindrical, grey-green shoots and reaches heights of 10 to 14 cm (3.9 to 5.5 in) with a diameter of 5 to 10 cm (2.0 to 3.9 in). There are 10 to 18 low and broad, conically bumpy ribs present. The mostly curved, pliable, yellowish-brown spines turn gray with age. The one to four central spines are 2 to 15 cm (0.79 to 5.91 in) and 8 to 18 radial spines 1.5 to 5 cm (0.59 to 1.97 in) long.

The straight to slightly curved, crimson flowers are up to 8.5 cm (3.3 in) long and have a diameter of 7 cm (2.8 in). The spherical, green fruits reach a diameter of up to 1 cm (0.39 in).

== Distribution ==
Matucana krahnii is found in the Peruvian Amazon region north of the town of Balsas on steep sandstone slopes at altitudes of 1650 to 1750 meters.

== Taxonomy ==
The first description as Borzicactus krahnii was in 1979 by John Donald Donald. The specific epithet krahnii honors the German cactus collector Wolfgang Krahn (* 1939). Rob Bregman placed the species in the genus Matucana in 1986.
