= Matucana rebutiiflora =

Scientific classification
- Kingdom: Plantae
- Clade: Tracheophytes
- Clade: Angiosperms
- Clade: Eudicots
- Order: Caryophyllales
- Family: Cactaceae
- Subfamily: Cactoideae
- Genus: Matucana
- Species: M. rebutiiflora

Binomial name
- Matucana rebutiiflora G.J.Charles

Synonyms
- Matucana oreodoxa subsp. rebutiiflora (G.J.Charles) Corman

Species of cactus

Matucana rebutiiflora is a species of cactus in the subfamily Cactoideae, native to Peru.

== Description ==
Matucana rebutiiflora displays a spherical shape in a medium-green color, reaching a diameter of up to 7 cm (2.8 in) and forms compact clusters of stems with a substantial taproot. As the plant matures, it develops 9-12 ribs, and their number increases over time. These ribs are segmented into well-defined tubercles, separated by horizontal groove. Areoles are circular with whitish felt and measuring 0.7 cm (0.28 in) in diameter and spaced approximately 1.2 cm (0.47 in) apart. The plant has up to six radial spines, each extending up to 2 cm (0.79 in), accompanied by a central spine reaching 2.5 cm (0.98 in) long. Spines are initially brownish and later fading to white, are mostly straight with a slight curve.

The flower of Matucana rebutiiflora measures 8.0 cm (3.1 in) in length, opens to a width of 6.5 cm (2.6 in), and displays a red hue with a hint of violet, featuring a prominent white base on the inside. The fruit, approximately 1.7 x 1.3 cm (0.51 in), starts off green and undergoes a darkening process as it ages.

== Distribution ==
Two populations of plants were found in Department of Ancash of Peru, near Sihuas city, at elevations of 3100 meters.

== Taxonomy ==
This species was discovered in November 2012 and described in Bradleya in 2013.
