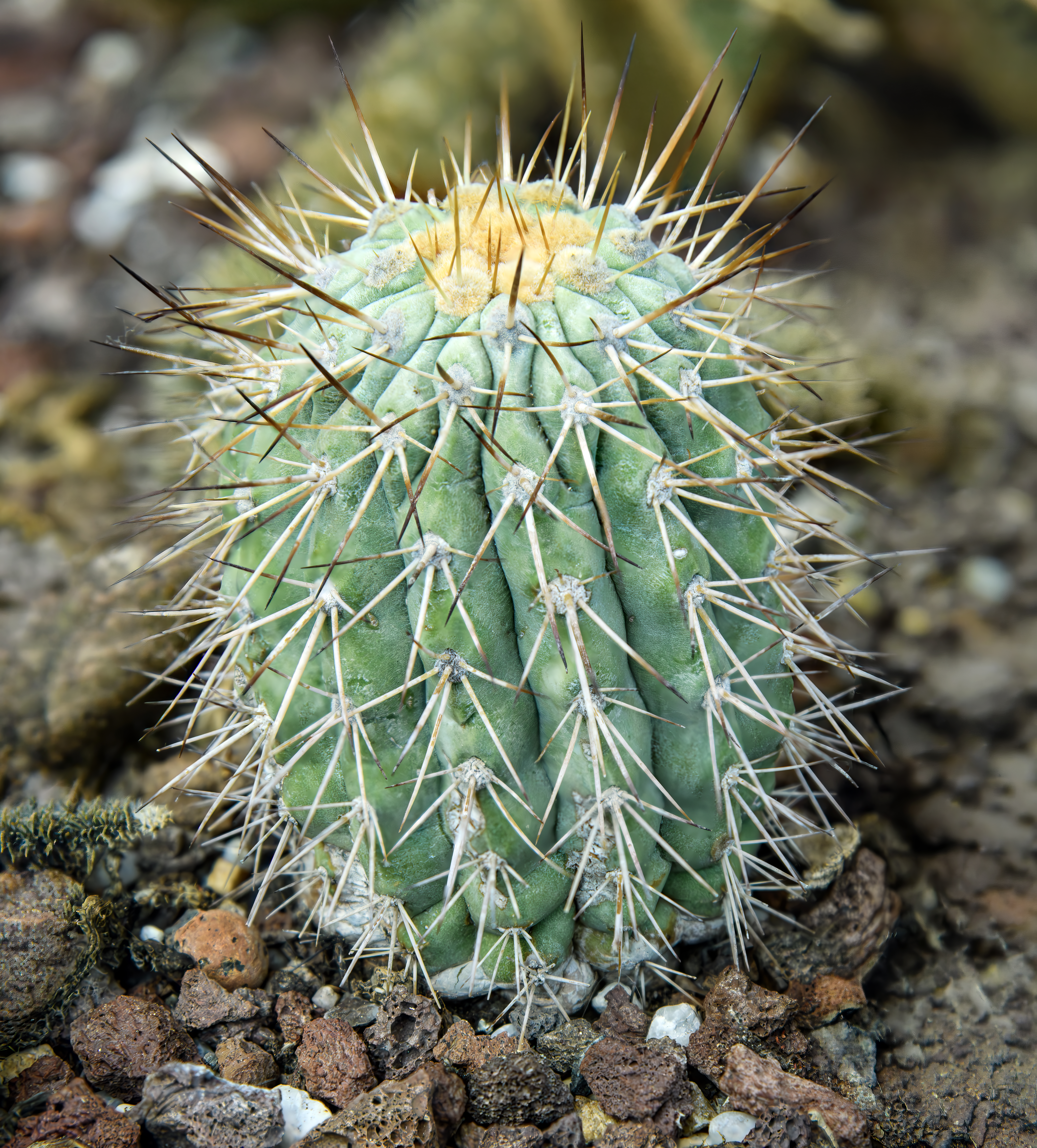
- Matucana weberbaueri
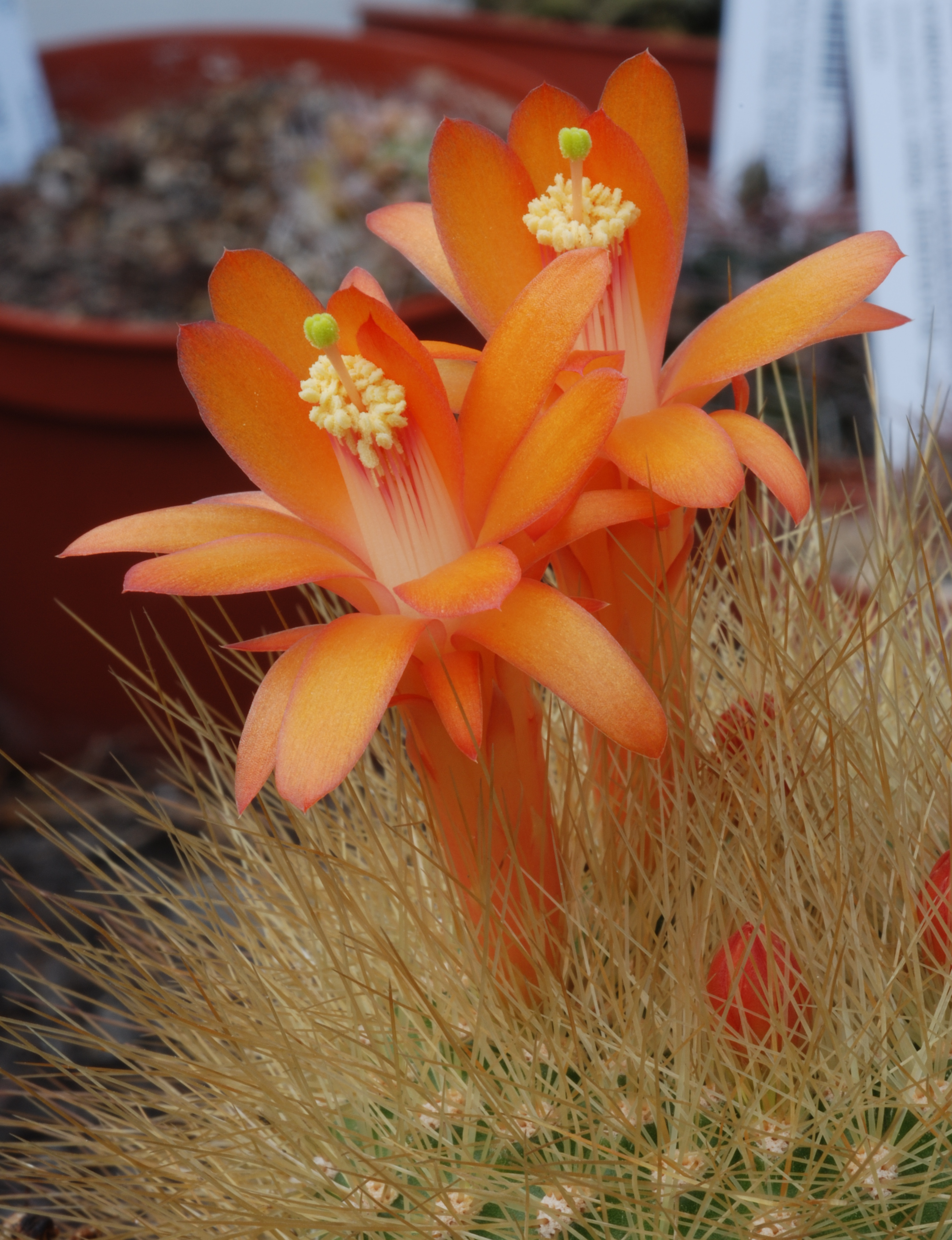
- flowers

Conservation status
- Endangered (IUCN 2.3)

Scientific classification
- Kingdom: Plantae
- Clade: Tracheophytes
- Clade: Angiosperms
- Clade: Eudicots
- Order: Caryophyllales
- Family: Cactaceae
- Subfamily: Cactoideae
- Genus: Matucana
- Species: M. weberbaueri

Binomial name
- Matucana weberbaueri (Vaupel) Backeb. 1939

= Matucana weberbaueri =

Species of cactus

Matucana weberbaueri is a species of Matucana found in Peru.

== Description ==
Matucana weberbaueri usually grows solitary with spherical to somewhat cylindrical, green shoots and reaches a height of up to 20 cm (7.9 in) with a diameter of 12 cm (4.7 in). There are 18 to 30 transversely furrowed ribs divided into humps. The 25 to 30 straight, needle-like, gold-colored to dark brown spines cannot be differentiated into central and radial spines. They are 1 to 5 cm (0.39 to 1.97 in) long.

The straight to slightly crooked, lemon yellow to orange flowers are up to 6 cm (2.4 in) long and have a diameter of 3 cm (1.2 in). The egg-shaped, red and green fruits reach a diameter of 8 mm (0.31 in).

== Distribution ==
It is endemic to the south of the department of Amazonas at Otuzco on the west bank of the Río Marañón at Balsas at an altitude of 2000 to 2100 meters.

== Taxonomy ==
The first description as Echinocactus weberbaueri was in 1913 by Friedrich Karl Johann Vaupel. Curt Backeberg placed the species in the genus Matucana in 1939. Synonyms are Submatucana weberbaueri (Vaupel) hort. and Borzicactus weberbaueri (Vaupel) Donald (1971).
