= Matucana chrysacantha =

Scientific classification
- Kingdom: Plantae
- Clade: Tracheophytes
- Clade: Angiosperms
- Clade: Eudicots
- Order: Caryophyllales
- Family: Cactaceae
- Subfamily: Cactoideae
- Genus: Matucana
- Species: M. chrysacantha

Binomial name
- Matucana chrysacantha Hoxey & G.J.Charles

Species of cactus

Matucana chrysacantha is a species of Matucana found in Peru.
