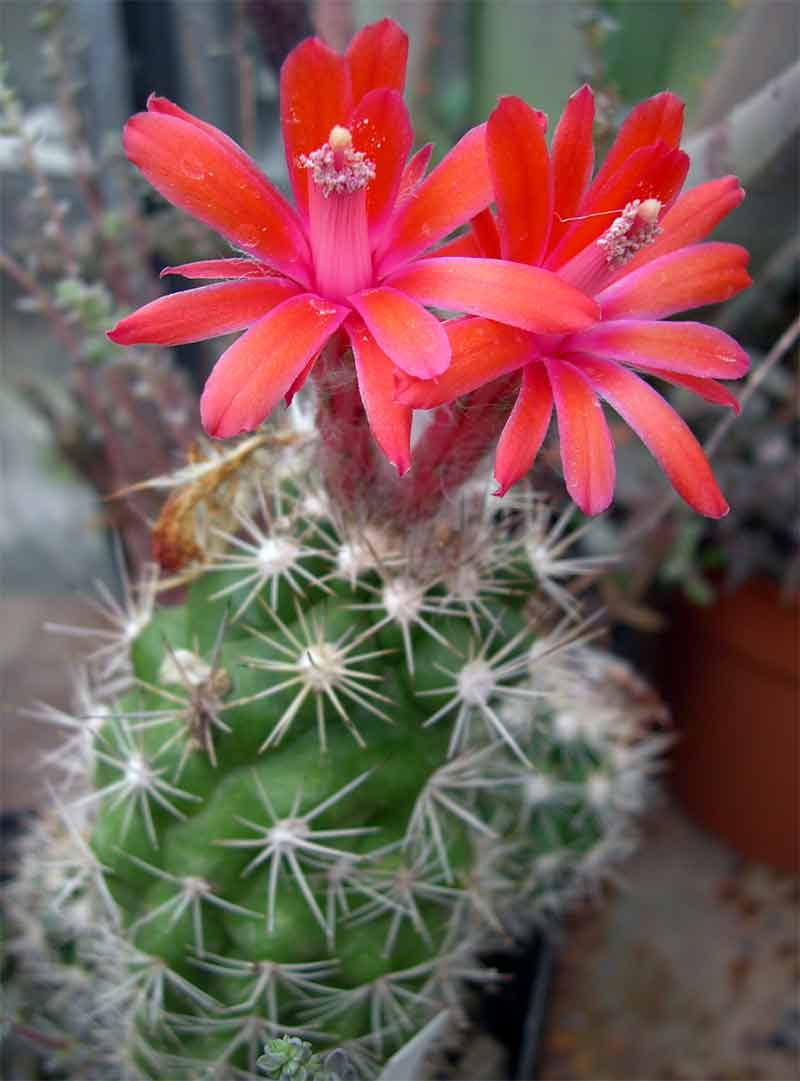

Conservation status
- Endangered (IUCN 3.1)

Scientific classification
- Kingdom: Plantae
- Clade: Tracheophytes
- Clade: Angiosperms
- Clade: Eudicots
- Order: Caryophyllales
- Family: Cactaceae
- Subfamily: Cactoideae
- Genus: Matucana
- Species: M. tuberculata

Binomial name
- Matucana tuberculata (Donald) Bregman, Meerst., Melis & A.B.Pullen 1978

Synonyms
- Borzicactus tuberculatus Donald 1979; Matucana tuberculosa F.Ritter 1981

= Matucana tuberculata =

Species of cactus

Matucana tuberculata is a species of Matucana found in Peru.

== Description ==
Matucana tuberculata grows with globular to ovate, bright green shoots that usually branch out from the base or above and reaches heights of growth of up to 10 cm (3.9 in) with a diameter of 4 to 7 cm (1.6 to 2.8 in). There are 14 to 18 broad straight or slightly twisted ribs articulated in conical protuberances. The straight spines are white to yellow. The one to four central spines have a darker tip and are 1 to 2 inches long. The eight to twelve radial spines reach a length of 0.5 to 1 cm (0.20 to 0.39 in).

The straight to curved, orange-red flowers are 5 to 5.5 inches long and have a diameter of 3.5 to 4 inches. Their bracts are edged with purple. The spherical, reddish-brown or green fruits reach a diameter of up to 6 mm (0.24 in).

== Distribution ==
Matucana tuberculata is distributed in the Peruvian region of La Libertad in the Marañón River basin at altitudes of 1800 to 2400 meters.

== Taxonomy ==
The first description as Borzicactus tuberculatus was in 1979 by John Donald Donald. Rob Bregman and his co-authors placed the species in the genus Matucana in 1987
