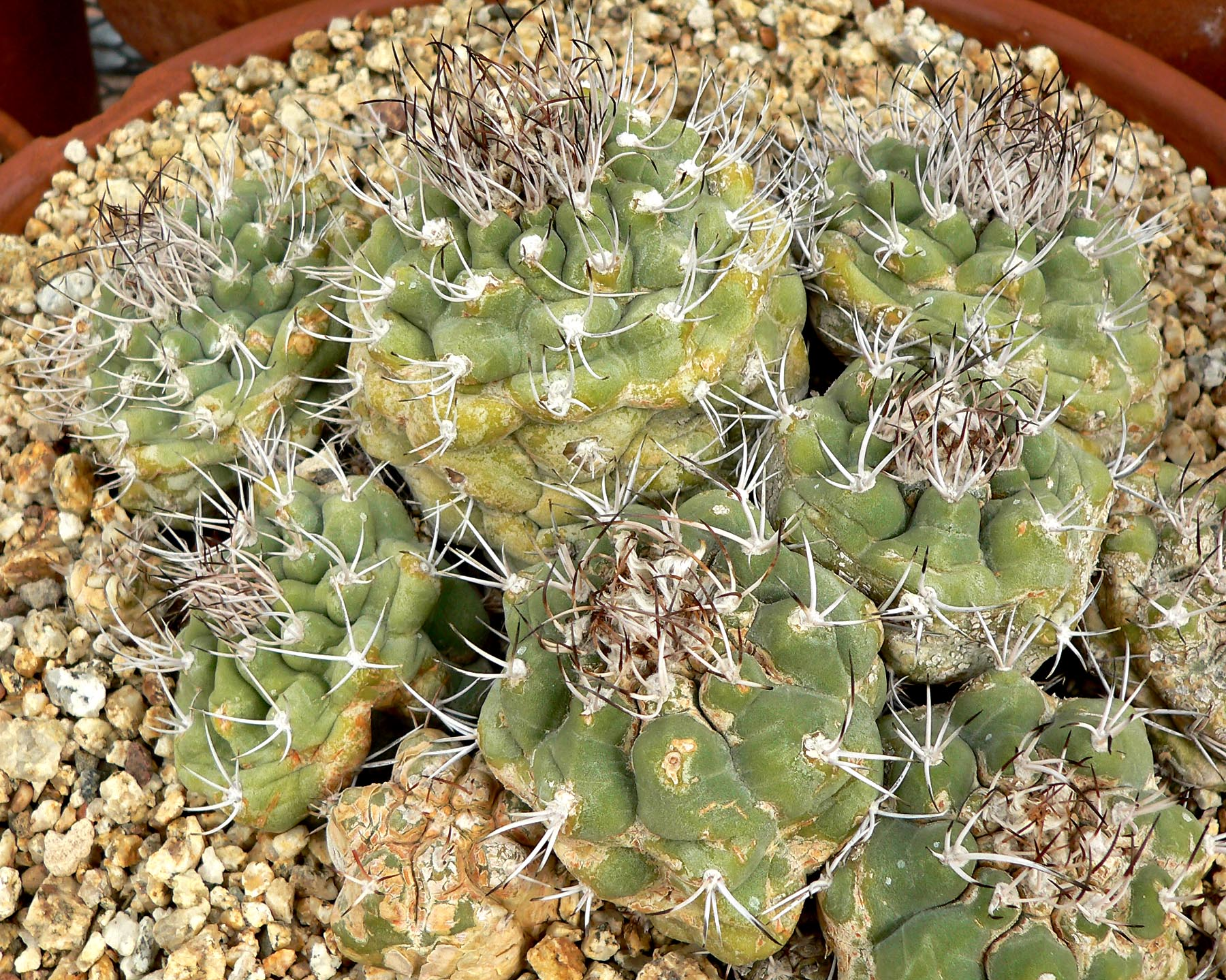

Conservation status
- Near Threatened (IUCN 2.3)

Scientific classification
- Kingdom: Plantae
- Clade: Tracheophytes
- Clade: Angiosperms
- Clade: Eudicots
- Order: Caryophyllales
- Family: Cactaceae
- Subfamily: Cactoideae
- Genus: Matucana
- Species: M. pujupatii

Binomial name
- Matucana pujupatii (Donald & A.B.Lau) Bregman

Synonyms
- Borzicactus madisoniorum var. pujupatii A.B.Lau & Donald 1971; Matucana madisoniorum var. pujupatii (A.B.Lau & Donald) G.D.Rowley 1973

= Matucana pujupatii =

Species of cactus

Matucana pujupatii is a species of Matucana found in Peru.

== Description ==
Matucana pujupatii occasionally grows with globular to ovoid, gray-green to blue-green shoots that branch slightly from the base and reaches heights of up to 15 cm (5.9 in) with diameters of 10 cm (3.9 in) and ten to twelve straight, wide ribs that are tuberculated. The spines are curved, flexible, brown and yellowish at their base, turning gray with age. The one or two central spines, that are sometimes missing, up to 5 cm (2.0 in) long and the six to nine radial spines are 0.5 to 2 cm (0.20 to 0.79 in) long.

The slightly curved, crimson flowers are 6 to 7 cm (2.4 to 2.8 in) long and 4 to 5 cm (1.6 to 2.0 in) in diameter. The spherical to egg-shaped, somewhat purple-green fruits reach a diameter of up to 10 mm (0.39 in).

== Distribution ==
Matucana pujupatii is widespread in the Peruvian Amazon and Cajamarca regions at altitudes of 1000 to 1500 meters.

== Taxonomy ==
The first description as Borzicactus madisoniorum var. pujupatii was made in 1971 by John Donald Donald and Alfred Bernhard Lau. The specific epithet pujupatii honors Shawintu Pujupat Dagses, a Peruvian boy who accompanied Alfred Bernhard Lau during his tour in Peru. Rob Bregman elevated the variety to the rank of a species in 1988. A synonym is Matucana madisoniorum var. pujupatii (Donald & A.B.Lau) G.D.Rowley (1971).
