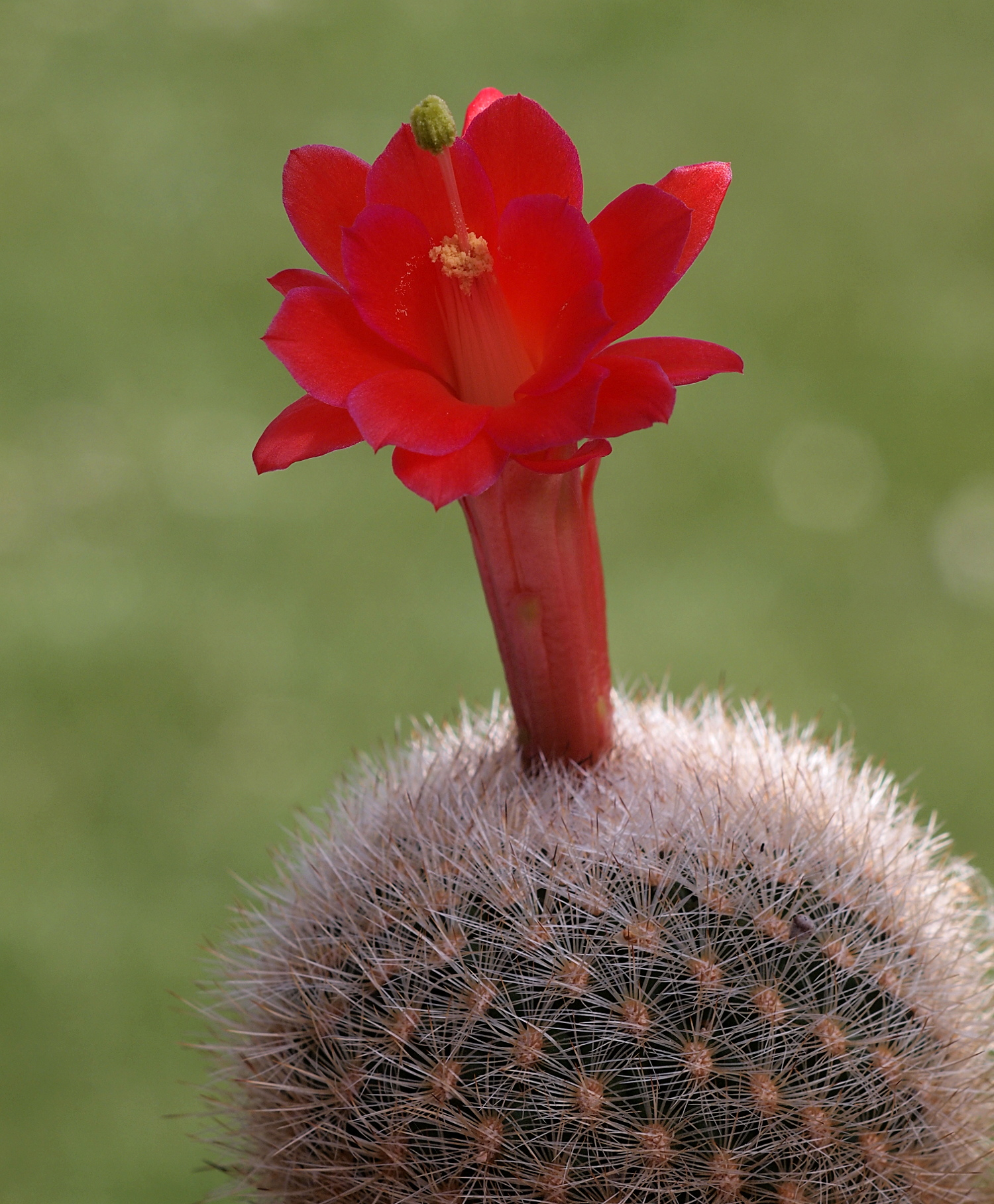

Conservation status
- Least Concern (IUCN 2.3)

Scientific classification
- Kingdom: Plantae
- Clade: Tracheophytes
- Clade: Angiosperms
- Clade: Eudicots
- Order: Caryophyllales
- Family: Cactaceae
- Subfamily: Cactoideae
- Genus: Matucana
- Species: M. haynii

Binomial name
- Matucana haynii (Otto ex Salm-Dyck) Britton & Rose 1922

Synonyms
- Arequipa haynii (Otto ex Salm-Dyck) Krainz 1963; Borzicactus haynii (Otto ex Salm-Dyck) Kimnach 1960; Cereus haynii (Otto ex Salm-Dyck) Croucher 1878; Echinocactus haynii Otto ex Salm-Dyck 1850; Echinopsis haynii (Otto ex Salm-Dyck) Molinari 2015; Mammillaria haynii (Otto ex Salm-Dyck) C.Ehrenb. 1844

= Matucana haynii =

Species of cactus

Matucana haynii is a species of Matucana found in Peru.

== Description ==
Matucana hayneii grows solitary or in sprouts with spherical to broadly cylindrical, with green shoots and reaches a height of up to 30 cm (12 in) with a diameter of 20 cm (7.9 in). There are 14 to 30 tuberculate ribs. The variable white to light brown spines turn gray with age. The one to 20 central spines are 1 to 7 cm (0.39 to 2.76 in) and the 14 to 45 radial spines 0.8 to 4 cm (0.31 to 1.57 in) long.

The mostly crooked flowers are crimson to salmon pink to a little crimson. They are 4 to 9 cm (1.6 to 3.5 in) long and have a diameter of up to 4 cm (1.6 in). The spherical to club-shaped, reddish green fruits are 1 to 1.5 cm (0.39 to 0.59 in) long and reach the same diameter.

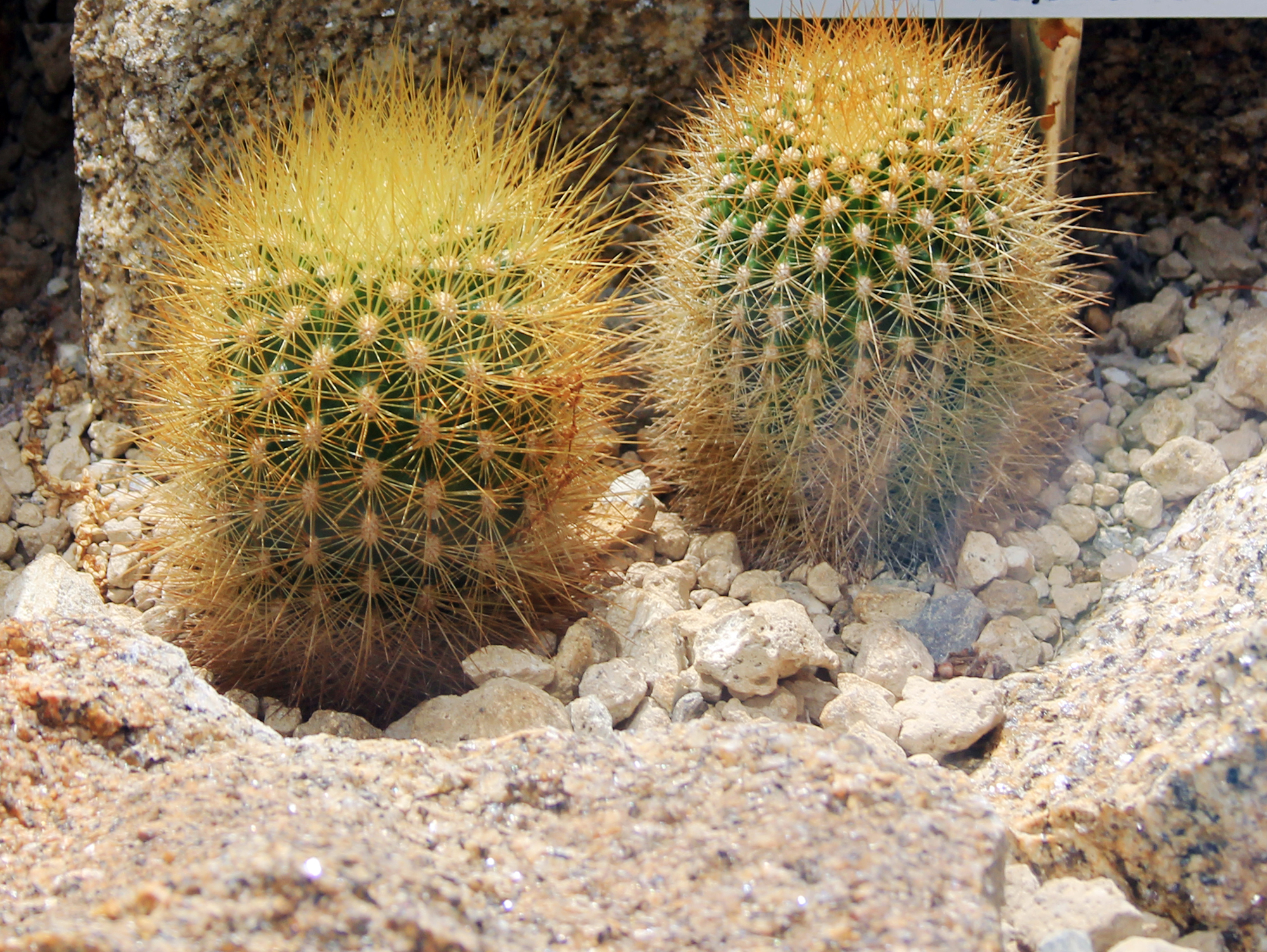
Plant

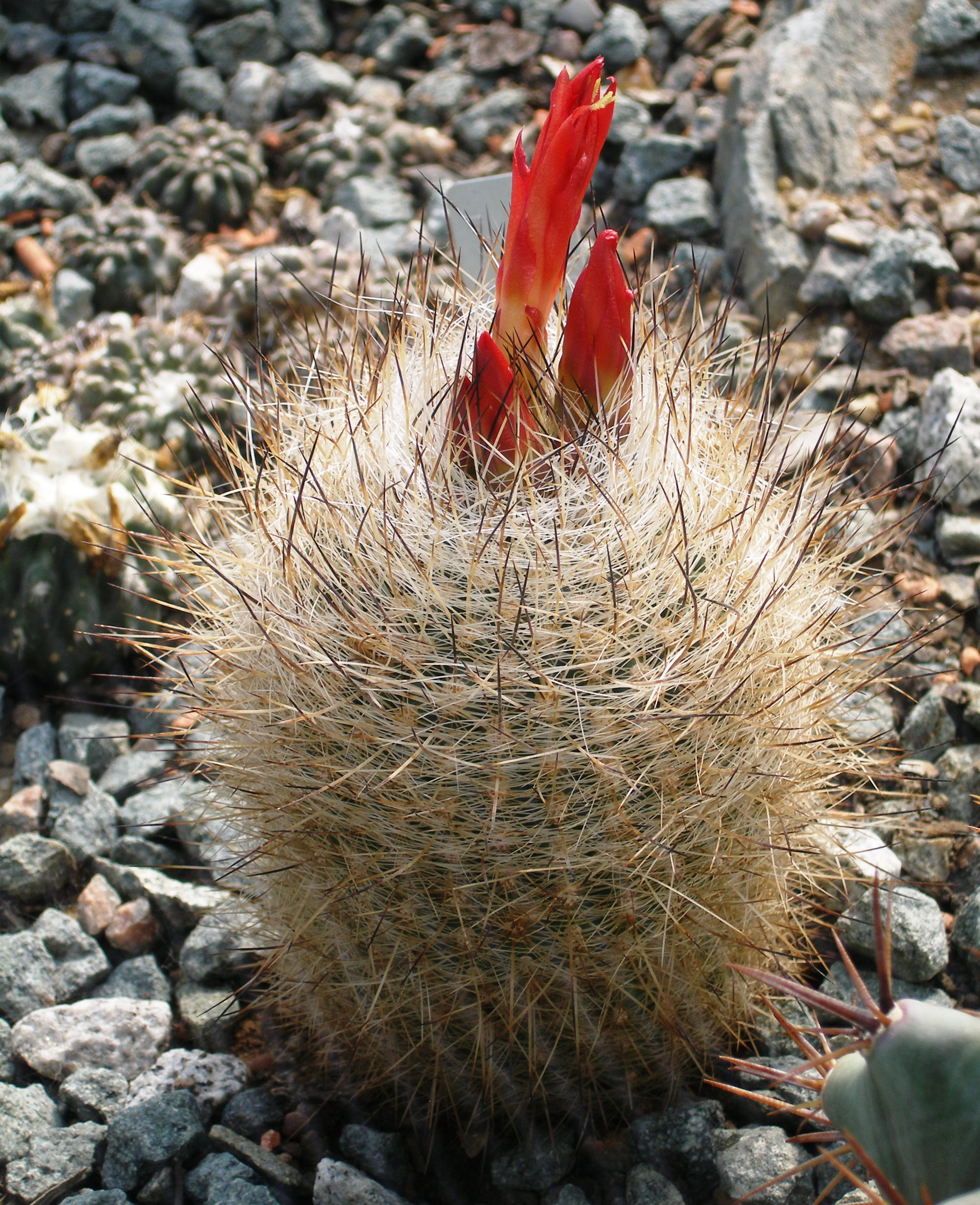
Flower

=== Subspecies ===
Image	Subspecies	Description	Distribution
	Matucana haynii subsp. haynii		
	Matucana haynii subsp. herzogiana (Backeb.) Mottram	Distinguished by smaller stem size, more or less curved setaceous radial spines	Cordillera Negra, Peru at 3200 meters
	Matucana haynii subsp. hystrix (Rauh & Backeb.) Mottram	Differs by having black central spines	Nazca to Lucamas, Peru at 3100-4000 meters
	Matucana haynii subsp. myriacantha (Vaupel) Mottram	Distinguished by pink and white flowers.	Cajamarca and Amazonas, at 200 meters

== Distribution ==
Matucana haynei is widespread in Peru from the La Libertad region to the Arequipa region on the western slope of the Andes at altitudes of 1500 to 4100 meters.

== Taxonomy ==
The first description as Echinocactus haynii was made in 1850 by Christoph Friedrich Otto in Joseph zu Salm-Reifferscheidt-Dyck's Cacteae in horto Dyckensi cultae anno 1849. Nathaniel Lord Britton and Joseph Nelson Rose placed the species in the genus Matucana in 1922. Other nomenclature synonyms are Mammillaria haynei (Otto in Salm-Dyck) Ehrenb. (1844), Cereus haynei (Otto in Salm-Dyck) Croucher (1878), Borzicactus haynei (Otto in Salm-Dyck) Kimnach (1960), Arequipa haynei (Otto in Salm-Dyck) Krainz (1963) and Echinopsis haynei (Otto in Salm-Dyck) Molinari (2015)
