= Peperomia wolfgang-krahnii =

Scientific classification
- Kingdom: Plantae
- Clade: Embryophytes
- Clade: Tracheophytes
- Clade: Angiosperms
- Clade: Magnoliids
- Order: Piperales
- Family: Piperaceae
- Genus: Peperomia
- Species: P. wolfgang-krahnii

Binomial name
- Peperomia wolfgang-krahnii Rauh

Species of plant

Peperomia wolfgang-krahnii is a succulent species of plant endemic to the country of Peru. It has grey-green leaves that can have 5 inches of the shrub. Leaves alternate from the top being grey-greened and warty, while the bottom is folded with smooth and shiny leaves.
