= Friedrich Ritter =

German botanist

Friedrich Ritter (9 May 1898 – 9 April 1989) was a German botanist who collected and described many species of cacti. Ritterocereus is named in his honour.

Friedrich Ritter studied biology, geology and paleontology at the University of Marburg. In 1920, before completing his studies, he emigrated to Mexico with his parents. In Mexico he worked for various mining companies. During this time he began to deal more intensively with cacti. From 1930 he undertook study trips to Peru, Bolivia, Argentina, Brazil and Chile. From 1937 to 1952 he lived in Germany and also served in the German Wehrmacht. In 1952 he immigrated again to South America and settled in Chile. From 1972 to late 1976 he lived in Paraguay. From the end of 1976 he lived again in Germany with his sister in Spangenberg near Kassel. In 1982 he moved to the Canary Islands.
