= List of Piper species =

Piper is a genus of plants in the family Piperaceae. The following is a list of all 2432 species in the genus which are recognised by Plants of the World Online as of 19 April 2026.

== A ==
- Piper abajoense Bornst.
- Piper abalienatum Trel.
- Piper abbadianum Yunck.
- Piper abbreviatum Opiz
- Piper abellinum Trel. & Yunck.
- Piper aberrans C.DC.
- Piper abutiloides (Kunth) Kunth ex Steud.
- Piper achoteanum Trel.
- Piper achotense Trel. & Yunck.
- Piper achromatolepis Trel.
- Piper achupallasense Yunck.
- Piper acre Blume
- Piper actae Trel.
- Piper acutamentum C.DC.
- Piper acutibracteum C.DC.
- Piper acutifolium Ruiz & Pav.
- Piper acutilimbum C.DC.
- Piper acutissimum Trel.
- Piper acutistigmum C.DC.
- Piper acutistipulum C.DC.
- Piper acutiusculum C.DC.
- Piper acutulum Trel.
- Piper adamatum Trel. & Standl.
- Piper addisonii Yunck.
- Piper adenandrum (Miq.) C.DC.
- Piper adenophlebium Trel.
- Piper admirabile Yunck.
- Piper adreptum Trel.
- Piper aduncum L.
- Piper aequale Vahl
- Piper aereum Trel.
- Piper aeruginosibaccum Trel.
- Piper affectans Trel.
- Piper affictum Trel.
- Piper afflictum Trel.
- Piper agellifolium Trel. & Yunck.
- Piper aghaense E.F.Guim. & Carv.-Silva
- Piper agostiniorum Steyerm.
- Piper aguacalientis Trel.
- Piper aguadulcense Yunck.
- Piper agusanense C.DC.
- Piper ailigandiense Callejas
- Piper alajuelanum Trel.
- Piper alatabaccum Trel. & Yunck.
- Piper alatipetiolatum Yunck.
- Piper albamentum C.DC.
- Piper albanense Yunck.
- Piper albiciliatum Yunck.
- Piper albidiflorum C.DC.
- Piper albidistigmatum C.DC.
- Piper albidum Kunth
- Piper albogranulatum Trel.
- Piper albomaculatum D.Dietr.
- Piper albopapillatum Trel.
- Piper albopilosum Yunck.
- Piper albopunctatum C.DC.
- Piper albopunctulatissimum Trel.
- Piper albozonatum C.DC.
- Piper albuginiferum Trel.
- Piper alexii Callejas
- Piper aleyreanum C.DC.
- Piper allardii Yunck.
- Piper allatum Trel.
- Piper allisum Trel.
- Piper alnoides (Kunth) Kunth ex Steud.
- Piper altevaginans Trel.
- Piper alushii Callejas
- Piper alveolatum Opiz
- Piper alwynii M.A.Jaram.
- Piper amalago L.
- Piper amoenum Yunck.
- Piper amparoense Yunck.
- Piper amphibium Trel.
- Piper amphioxys Trel.
- Piper amphitrichum Trel.
- Piper amphoricarpum Trel.
- Piper amplectenticaule Trel. & Yunck.
- Piper anastylum Trel.
- Piper andakiensis W.Trujillo-C. & Callejas
- Piper andersii M.A.Jaram.
- Piper andreanum C.DC.
- Piper andresense Trel.
- Piper androgynum C.DC.
- Piper angamarcanum Sodiro ex C.DC.
- Piper angsiense I.M.Turner
- Piper angustifolium Lam.
- Piper angustipeltatum Merr.
- Piper anisophyllum Trel.
- Piper anisopleurum C.DC.
- Piper anisotis Hook.f.
- Piper anisotrichum C.DC.
- Piper anisum (Spreng.) Angely
- Piper annulatispicum Trel. & Yunck.
- Piper anonifolium (Kunth) Steud.
- Piper anonymum Trel.
- Piper anostachyum Yunck.
- Piper antherisobovatum Callejas
- Piper antioquiense C.DC.
- Piper antonense Callejas
- Piper apertum Trel.
- Piper apodum Trel.
- Piper appendiculatum (Benth.) C.DC.
- Piper apurimacanum Trel.
- Piper apus Trel.
- Piper aramanum C.DC.
- Piper araneatum Trel.
- Piper araquei Yunck.
- Piper arbelaezii Trel. & Yunck.
- Piper arboreum Aubl.
- Piper arborigaudens C.DC.
- Piper arborioccupans Trel. ex Callejas
- Piper arcessitum Trel.
- Piper archeri Trel. & Yunck.
- Piper arcteacuminatum Trel.
- Piper arcuatum Blume
- Piper arduum Trel.
- Piper arenicola Trel.
- Piper areolatum (Miq.) C.DC.
- Piper arfakianum C.DC.
- Piper argentamentum Trel. & Yunck.
- Piper argyrites Ridl. ex C.DC.
- Piper argyroneurum Hallier f.
- Piper argyrophyllum Miq.
- Piper arianeae G.A.Queiroz, Sarnaglia & E.F.Guim.
- Piper arieianum C.DC.
- Piper aristolochiphyllum Quisumb.
- Piper armatum Trel. & Yunck.
- Piper aromaticaule Callejas
- Piper arrectispicum Trel.
- Piper arreptum Trel.
- Piper artanthe C.DC.
- Piper artanthopse C.DC.
- Piper articulatum A.Rich.
- Piper arunachalense Gajurel, Rethy & Y.Kumar
- Piper arundinetorum Trel.
- Piper ascendentispicum Trel.
- Piper asclepiadifolium Trel.
- Piper aserrianum Trel.
- Piper aspericaule Trel.
- Piper asperilimbum C.DC.
- Piper asperiusculum Kunth
- Piper asperulibaccum C.DC.
- Piper asplundii Yunck.
- Piper asterocarpum Trel.
- Piper asterostigmum Quisumb.
- Piper asterotrichum C.DC.
- Piper asymmetricum C.DC.
- Piper atlantidanum Trel.
- Piper atrichopus Trel.
- Piper atrobaccum Trel. & Yunck.
- Piper atroglandulosum Tebbs
- Piper atropremnon Trel.
- Piper attenuatamentum Trel.
- Piper attenuatum Buch.-Ham. ex Miq.
- Piper augustum Rudge
- Piper aulacospermum Callejas
- Piper auriculiferum Trel.
- Piper auriculilaminum Yunck.
- Piper aurilimbum C.DC.
- Piper auritifolium Trel.
- Piper auritum Kunth
- Piper aurorubrum C.DC.
- Piper austini Trel.
- Piper austrocaledonicum C.DC.
- Piper austromexicanum Trel.
- Piper austrosinense Y.C.Tseng
- Piper avanum Wall.
- Piper avellanum (Miq.) C.DC.
- Piper azuaiense Yunck.
- Piper azupizuanum Trel.

== B ==
- Piper baccans (Miq.) C.DC.
- Piper baccatum Blume
- Piper baculiferum Trel.
- Piper baezanum Sodiro ex C.DC.
- Piper baezense Trel.
- Piper baguionum C.DC.
- Piper bahianum Yunck.
- Piper bajanum Trel. & Yunck.
- Piper bakeri C.DC. ex Callejas
- Piper bakerianum C.DC.
- Piper balansae C.DC.
- Piper balsapuertanum Trel.
- Piper bambusifolium Y.C.Tseng
- Piper bangii C.DC.
- Piper bangkanum C.DC.
- Piper bantamense Blume
- Piper baracoanum León
- Piper baramense C.DC.
- Piper barbatum Kunth
- Piper barberi Gamble
- Piper barbicuspe Trel.
- Piper barbinerve Trel.
- Piper barbirostre Trel.
- Piper barbispicum C.DC.
- Piper barbosanum Trel. & Yunck.
- Piper barbulantherum Trel.
- Piper barbulatum C.DC.
- Piper barcoense Yunck.
- Piper barkleyi Yunck.
- Piper barretoi Yunck.
- Piper barriosense Trel. & Standl.
- Piper bartlingianum (Miq.) C.DC.
- Piper basegibbosum Callejas
- Piper basilobatum Trel. & Yunck.
- Piper batuanum C.DC.
- Piper beccarii C.DC.
- Piper begoniicolor Trel. & Yunck.
- Piper begoniifolium Hook. & Arn.
- Piper begoniiforme Yunck.
- Piper belicense Callejas
- Piper bellidifolium Yunck.
- Piper belloi Yunck.
- Piper bellum Yunck.
- Piper belterraense Yunck.
- Piper bengalense C.DC.
- Piper bennettianum C.DC.
- Piper berembunense Chaveer. & Sudmoon
- Piper berlandieri C.DC.
- Piper bermejanum Trel. & Yunck.
- Piper bernoullii C.DC. ex Callejas
- Piper berryi Steyerm.
- Piper betle L.
- Piper betleoides C.DC.
- Piper betloides Chaveer. & Tanomtong
- Piper biauritum C.DC.
- Piper bicorne Carv.-Silva, E.F.Guim. & L.A.Pereira
- Piper bikanum O.Schwartz
- Piper bilobulatum C.DC.
- Piper bipedale C.DC.
- Piper bipunctatum C.DC.
- Piper biritak Trel. & Standl.
- Piper bisasperatum Trel.
- Piper biseriatum C.DC.
- Piper bistigmatum C.DC.
- Piper blattarum Spreng.
- Piper blepharilepidum Trel.
- Piper boehmeriifolium (Miq.) Wall. ex C.DC.
- Piper boissierianum C.DC.
- Piper boivinii C.DC.
- Piper bojonyum C.DC.
- Piper bolanicum Schltr. ex R.O.Gardner
- Piper bolivaranum Yunck.
- Piper bolivianum C.DC.
- Piper bonii C.DC.
- Piper boorsroae C.DC.
- Piper boqueronense Callejas
- Piper boquetense Yunck.
- Piper boquianum Trel. & Yunck.
- Piper borbonense (Miq.) C.DC.
- Piper borneense N.E.Br.
- Piper bosnicanum C.DC.
- Piper botrytes Vahl
- Piper bourgeaui C.DC.
- Piper bowiei Yunck.
- Piper brachipilum Yunck.
- Piper brachistopodum C.DC.
- Piper brachypetiolatum Yunck.
- Piper brachypodon (Benth.) C.DC.
- Piper brachypus Trel.
- Piper brachystylum Trel.
- Piper brachytrichum Trel.
- Piper bradei Yunck.
- Piper brassii Trel.
- Piper bredemeyeri J.Jacq.
- Piper breedlovei Callejas
- Piper brenesii C.DC.
- Piper breve C.DC.
- Piper brevesanum Yunck.
- Piper breviamentum C.DC.
- Piper brevicuspe (Miq.) Merr.
- Piper brevifolium C.DC.
- Piper brevilimbum C.DC.
- Piper brevipedicellatum Bornst.
- Piper brevipedunculatum C.DC.
- Piper brevipes C.DC.
- Piper brevispicum C.DC.
- Piper brevistigmum C.DC.
- Piper brevistrigillosum Trel.
- Piper brevistylum C.DC.
- Piper brewsteri Callejas
- Piper brisasense Yunck.
- Piper brongniartii (Miq.) C.DC.
- Piper brownsbergense Yunck.
- Piper brumadinense Carv.-Silva & E.F.Guim.
- Piper bryogetum C.DC.
- Piper buchii Urb.
- Piper buchingeri C.DC. ex Callejas
- Piper bullatifolium Sodiro
- Piper bullatilimbum Pilg.
- Piper bullosum C.DC.
- Piper bullulatum M.A.Jaram.
- Piper bullulifolium Trel.
- Piper burenii C.DC.
- Piper burgeri Callejas
- Piper buruanum Miq.

== C ==
- Piper cabagranum C.DC.
- Piper caballetense R.Bernal
- Piper caballo-cochanum Trel.
- Piper cabralanum C.DC.
- Piper cachimboense Yunck.
- Piper cacuminum C.DC.
- Piper cadenaense Tebbs
- Piper caducibracteum C.DC.
- Piper caguanense W.Trujillo-C. & M.A.Jaram.
- Piper cajamarcanum Yunck.
- Piper cajambrense Trel. & Yunck.
- Piper caladiifolium (Miq.) C.DC.
- Piper calamistratum Trel.
- Piper calanyanum Trel. & Yunck.
- Piper calcaratum C.DC.
- Piper calcariforme Tebbs
- Piper calceolarium C.DC.
- Piper caldasianum (Miq.) Yunck.
- Piper caldense C.DC.
- Piper calderonii Trel. ex Callejas
- Piper caliendriferum Trel.
- Piper callcanense Trel.
- Piper callejasii W.Trujillo-C. & M.A.Jaram.
- Piper callibracteum C.DC.
- Piper callosum Ruiz & Pav.
- Piper calocoma (Miq.) C.DC.
- Piper calophyllum C.DC.
- Piper calvarii S.M.Niño & Dorr
- Piper calvescens Trel.
- Piper calvescentinerve Trel.
- Piper calvibaccum Trel.
- Piper calvilimbum C.DC.
- Piper calvirameum C.DC.
- Piper cambessedesii (Miq.) C.DC.
- Piper cambodianum C.DC.
- Piper camiloi Yunck.
- Piper campanum Yunck.
- Piper camphoriferum C.DC.
- Piper campii Yunck.
- Piper camptostachys Urb.
- Piper canaense Standl.
- Piper canaliculum Tebbs
- Piper canastrense E.F.Guim. & Carv.-Silva
- Piper canavillosum Steyerm.
- Piper candelarianum C.DC.
- Piper candollei Sodiro
- Piper canescens J.Mathew
- Piper canovillosum Steyerm.
- Piper capacibracteum Trel.
- Piper capense L.f.
- Piper capillipes Trel. & Yunck.
- Piper capillistipes Trel.
- Piper capitarianum Yunck.
- Piper capitellatum C.DC.
- Piper captum Trel.
- Piper caquetanum Yunck.
- Piper caracolanum C.DC.
- Piper caranoense W.Trujillo-C.
- Piper cararense Trel. & Yunck.
- Piper carautensei E.F.Guim. & Carv.-Silva
- Piper cariacicaense Carv.-Silva & E.F.Guim.
- Piper carizalanum C.DC.
- Piper carlosii Trel. & Yunck.
- Piper carminis Trel.
- Piper carnibracteum C.DC.
- Piper carniconnectivum C.DC.
- Piper carnistigmum C.DC.
- Piper carpinteranum C.DC.
- Piper carpunya Ruiz & Pav.
- Piper carrapanum Trel.
- Piper carrilloanum C.DC.
- Piper cartagoanum C.DC.
- Piper casapiense (Miq.) C.DC.
- Piper casimirianum Hemsl.
- Piper cassinoides Opiz
- Piper casteloense Yunck.
- Piper castroanum Trel. & Yunck.
- Piper cataractarum Trel.
- Piper cathayanum M.G.Gilbert & N.H.Xia
- Piper cativalense Trel.
- Piper catripense Yunck.
- Piper caucaense Yunck.
- Piper caudatifolium Trel.
- Piper cavalcantei Yunck.
- Piper cavendishioides Trel. & Yunck.
- Piper cayoense Trel.
- Piper ceanothifolium Kunth
- Piper ceibense C.DC.
- Piper cejanum Trel. & Yunck.
- Piper celebicum Blume
- Piper celer Trel.
- Piper celsum Trel.
- Piper celtidiforme Opiz
- Piper cenocladum C.DC.
- Piper centroense Trel. & Yunck.
- Piper ceramicum (Miq.) C.DC.
- Piper cercidiphyllum Trel.
- Piper cernuum Vell.
- Piper cerrocampanum Callejas
- Piper cerronianum Steyerm.
- Piper certeguiense Trel. & Yunck.
- Piper chacaritaense Callejas
- Piper chagresianum Trel.
- Piper chalhuapuquianum Trel.
- Piper chamissonis Steud.
- Piper chanchamayanum Trel.
- Piper chanekii Trel.
- Piper changuinolanum Trel.
- Piper chantaranothaii Suwanph. & D.A.Simpson
- Piper chaveerachiae Idrees & Z.Yong Zhang
- Piper chavicoides (Miq.) C.DC.
- Piper cheyennense Trel. & Standl.
- Piper chiadoense Yunck.
- Piper chiangdaoense Suwanph. & Chantar.
- Piper chiapasense Callejas
- Piper chimborazoense Yunck.
- Piper chimonanthifolium (Kunth) Kunth ex Steud.
- Piper chinantlense M.Martens & Galeotti
- Piper chinense Miq.
- Piper chiquihuitense Trel. & Standl.
- Piper chiriquinum C.DC.
- Piper chirripoense C.DC.
- Piper chlorostachyum C.DC.
- Piper choapamense Trel. ex Callejas
- Piper christyi C.DC.
- Piper chromatolepis Trel.
- Piper chrysoneurum Trel.
- Piper chrysostachyum C.DC.
- Piper chuarense M.A.Jaram. & Callejas
- Piper chumboense Yunck.
- Piper churruyacoanum Trel. & Yunck.
- Piper churumayu Ruiz & Pav.
- Piper cicatriculosum Trel. & Yunck.
- Piper cihuatlanense Bornst.
- Piper ciliatifolium Trel.
- Piper cilibracteum C.DC.
- Piper cililimbum Yunck.
- Piper ciliomarginatum Görts & Christenh.
- Piper cincinnatum Trel.
- Piper cinereocaule C.DC.
- Piper cinereum C.DC.
- Piper cingens C.DC.
- Piper ciniflonis Trel.
- Piper circumspectantis Trel.
- Piper cirratum Trel.
- Piper cisnerosense Trel. & Yunck.
- Piper cispontinum Trel.
- Piper claseanum Bornst.
- Piper clathratum Sodiro ex C.DC.
- Piper claudii C.DC.
- Piper claussenianum (Miq.) C.DC.
- Piper clavibracteum C.DC.
- Piper clavuligerum Trel.
- Piper clivicola Standl. & L.O.Williams
- Piper coactile Ridl.
- Piper coactipilum Trel.
- Piper coactoris Trel.
- Piper coariense Yunck.
- Piper cobanense Trel.
- Piper cobarianum Trel. & Yunck.
- Piper coccoloboides (Kunth) Kunth ex Steud.
- Piper cochleatum Sodiro
- Piper coclense Callejas
- Piper cocornanum Trel. & Yunck.
- Piper cocquericotense Trel.
- Piper coeloneurum Diels
- Piper coilostachyum C.DC.
- Piper colaphitolerans Trel.
- Piper colipanum C.DC.
- Piper colligatispicum Trel. & Yunck.
- Piper collinum C.DC.
- Piper colonense C.DC.
- Piper colotlipanense Bornst.
- Piper colubrinum Link
- Piper comasense Trel.
- Piper comatum Trel.
- Piper comayaguanum Trel.
- Piper come Trel. & Standl.
- Piper commutatum Steud.
- Piper compactum Trel.
- Piper concepcionis Trel.
- Piper concinnifolium Trel.
- Piper concretiflorum C.DC.
- Piper conditum Trel.
- Piper condotoense Trel. & Yunck.
- Piper conejoense Trel. & Yunck.
- Piper confertinodum (Trel. & Yunck.) M.A.Jaram. & Callejas
- Piper confusionis Trel.
- Piper confusum C.DC.
- Piper conibaccum C.DC.
- Piper conispicum Trel.
- Piper coniunctonis Callejas
- Piper conquistanum Yunck.
- Piper consanguineum (Kunth) Steud.
- Piper constanzanum (C.DC.) Urb.
- Piper contraverrugosum (Cuatrec.) R.Bernal
- Piper controversum Steud.
- Piper conversum Trel.
- Piper cooperi Yunck.
- Piper copacabanense Trel.
- Piper copeyanum (C.DC.) Trel.
- Piper coralfalgense C.DC.
- Piper corcovadense (Miq.) C.DC.
- Piper cordatilimbum Quisumb.
- Piper cordatum C.DC.
- Piper cordiforme Steyerm.
- Piper cordilimbum C.DC.
- Piper cordillerianum C.DC.
- Piper cordoncillo Trel.
- Piper cordovanum C.DC.
- Piper corei (Yunck.) R.Bernal
- Piper coriaceilimbum C.DC.
- Piper corintoananum Yunck.
- Piper cornifolium Kunth
- Piper cornilimbum C.DC.
- Piper coronanum Trel. & Standl.
- Piper coronatibracteum Trel.
- Piper corozalanum Trel.
- Piper corpulentispicum Trel. & Yunck.
- Piper corrugatum Kuntze
- Piper coruscans Kunth
- Piper corylistachyopsis Trel.
- Piper costaricense C.DC.
- Piper costatum C.DC.
- Piper costulatum C.DC.
- Piper courtallense P.K.Mukh.
- Piper cowanii (Yunck.) Yunck.
- Piper coyolesense Trel.
- Piper crassicaule Trel.
- Piper crassinervium Kunth
- Piper crassipedunculum Yunck.
- Piper crassipes Korth. ex Miq.
- Piper crassistilum Yunck.
- Piper crassum Blume
- Piper crebrinodum C.DC.
- Piper crenatifolium Trel. & Yunck.
- Piper crenulatibracteum C.DC.
- Piper crenulatum Steyerm.
- Piper cricamolense Trel.
- Piper criniovarium Yunck.
- Piper crispatum A.C.Sm.
- Piper cristalinanum Trel. & Yunck.
- Piper cristicola Trel.
- Piper cristinanum Trel. & Standl.
- Piper crocatum Ruiz & Pav.
- Piper cuasianum Standl.
- Piper cuatrecasasii (Trel. & Yunck.) R.Bernal
- Piper cubataonum C.DC.
- Piper cubeba L.f.
- Piper cubilquitzianum C.DC.
- Piper cucullatum Callejas
- Piper cufodontii Trel.
- Piper culebranum C.DC.
- Piper cumanense Kunth
- Piper cumaralense C.DC.
- Piper cumbasonum C.DC.
- Piper cumbotianum C.DC.
- Piper cuniculorum Trel. & Yunck.
- Piper cunninghamii Yunck.
- Piper cupreatum Trel.
- Piper curridabatanum Trel.
- Piper curtifolium C.DC.
- Piper curtilimbum C.DC.
- Piper curtipetiolum C.DC.
- Piper curtirachis W.C.Burger
- Piper curtisii C.DC.
- Piper curtispicum C.DC.
- Piper curtistilum C.DC.
- Piper curtistipes C.DC.
- Piper curvatipes Trel.
- Piper curvatum Ruiz & Pav.
- Piper curvinervium Callejas & Betancur
- Piper curvipilum Trel.
- Piper cuspidatum Desv.
- Piper cuspidibracteatum Yunck.
- Piper cuspidiflorum Callejas
- Piper cuspidilimbum C.DC.
- Piper cuspidispicum Trel.
- Piper cutucuense Yunck.
- Piper cuyabanum C.DC.
- Piper cuyunianum Steyerm.
- Piper cyanophyllum Trel.
- Piper cyphophyllopse Trel. & Yunck.
- Piper cyphophyllum C.DC.
- Piper cyprium Trel. & Yunck.
- Piper cyrtopodum (Miq.) C.DC.
- Piper cyrtostachys Ridl.

== D ==
- Piper dactylostigmum Yunck.
- Piper daedalum Trel.
- Piper daguanum C.DC.
- Piper damiaoshanense Y.C.Tseng
- Piper daniel-gonzalezii Trel.
- Piper darienense C.DC.
- Piper dasyoura (Miq.) C.DC.
- Piper dasypodum (Miq.) C.DC.
- Piper dasypogon C.DC.
- Piper davaoense C.DC.
- Piper davidianum C.DC.
- Piper davidsoniae Yunck.
- Piper dawsonii Trel.
- Piper deamii Trel.
- Piper decipiens (Miq.) C.DC.
- Piper decrescens (Miq.) C.DC.
- Piper decumanum L.
- Piper decurrens C.DC.
- Piper decurtispicum (Trel. & Yunck.) Callejas
- Piper dedititium Trel.
- Piper deductum Trel.
- Piper deflexispicum Trel.
- Piper degeneri A.C.Sm.
- Piper delectans Trel.
- Piper delicatum C.DC.
- Piper deliciasanum Steyerm.
- Piper delirioi Sarnaglia & E.F.Guim.
- Piper deltoideocarpum Trel.
- Piper demeraranum (Miq.) C.DC.
- Piper demoratum Trel.
- Piper dempoanum C.DC.
- Piper dendroamans Trel. ex Callejas
- Piper dennisii Trel.
- Piper densiciliatum Yunck.
- Piper denudatissimum Callejas
- Piper depressibaccum Trel.
- Piper descourtilsianum C.DC.
- Piper desultorium Trel.
- Piper detonsum Trel.
- Piper diazanum Trel.
- Piper dichotomum Ruiz & Pav.
- Piper dichroostachyum Trel. & Yunck.
- Piper diffamatum Trel. & Yunck.
- Piper diffundum Yunck.
- Piper diffusum Vahl
- Piper diguaense Yunck.
- Piper dilatatum Rich.
- Piper dimetrale C.DC.
- Piper dimorphophyllum Trel.
- Piper dimorphotrichum Yunck.
- Piper dimorphum Callejas
- Piper dindingsianum C.DC.
- Piper diospyrifolium (Kunth) Kunth ex Steud.
- Piper dipterocarpinum C.DC.
- Piper diquisanum C.DC.
- Piper discriminatum Trel. & Yunck.
- Piper disparifolium Trel.
- Piper disparinervium Callejas
- Piper disparipes Trel.
- Piper disparipilum C.DC.
- Piper dissimulans Trel.
- Piper distichum Trel. & Yunck.
- Piper distigmatum Yunck.
- Piper divaricatum G.Mey.
- Piper diversipilum Trel.
- Piper divortans Trel. & Yunck.
- Piper divulgatum Trel. & Yunck.
- Piper djabia C.DC.
- Piper dodsonii Yunck.
- Piper doiphukhaense Suwanph. & Chantar.
- Piper dolichostachyum M.G.Gilbert & N.H.Xia
- Piper dolichostylum Callejas & Betancur
- Piper dolichotrichum Yunck.
- Piper domingense C.DC.
- Piper donnell-smithii C.DC.
- Piper dotanum Trel.
- Piper douglasii Callejas
- Piper dravidii Lekhak, Kambale & S.R.Yadav
- Piper dryadum C.DC.
- Piper duartei E.F.Guim. & Carv.-Silva
- Piper duckei C.DC.
- Piper dukei Yunck.
- Piper dulce Trel.
- Piper dumeticola C.DC.
- Piper dumiformans C.DC.
- Piper dumosum Rudge
- Piper dunlapii Trel.
- Piper dunstervilleorum Steyerm.
- Piper durilignum C.DC.
- Piper durilimbum C.DC.
- Piper durionoides Suwanph. & Chantar.
- Piper durvilleanum (Miq.) Trel.
- Piper dussii C.DC.

== E ==
- Piper ecallosum Trel.
- Piper echeverrianum Trel.
- Piper echinocaule Yunck.
- Piper echinovarium Yunck.
- Piper ecuadorense Sodiro
- Piper edurum Trel.
- Piper edwallii Yunck.
- Piper ejuncidum Trel.
- Piper elasmophyllum Trel.
- Piper elatostema Hallier f.
- Piper elbancoanum Trel. & Yunck.
- Piper elbertii C.DC.
- Piper elcaranyanum Trel. & Yunck.
- Piper eldoradense Trel. ex Callejas
- Piper ellipticifolium Yunck.
- Piper ellipticolanceolatum (C.DC.) Trel.
- Piper ellsworthii (Trel. & Yunck.) R.Bernal
- Piper elmeri Merr.
- Piper elongatum Vahl
- Piper elparamoense Yunck.
- Piper emancipationis Trel.
- Piper emmerichianum Yunck.
- Piper emollitum Trel.
- Piper emygdioi Yunck.
- Piper enckeaespicum (Trel. & Yunck.) Callejas
- Piper endlicherianum (Miq.) Trel.
- Piper enenyasense Trel.
- Piper enganyanum Trel. & Yunck.
- Piper ensifolium Quisumb.
- Piper entradense Trel. & Yunck.
- Piper epigynium C.DC.
- Piper epilosipes Trel.
- Piper epunctatum Trel.
- Piper erectamentum C.DC.
- Piper erecticaule C.DC.
- Piper erectipilum Yunck.
- Piper erectum C.DC.
- Piper eriocladum Sodiro
- Piper eriopodon (Miq.) C.DC.
- Piper erubescentispica Trel.
- Piper erythrostachyum C.DC.
- Piper erythroxyloides R.E.Schult. & García-Barr.
- Piper escaleranum C.DC.
- Piper escuadranum Trel.
- Piper esperancanum Yunck.
- Piper eucalyptifolium Rudge
- Piper eucalyptiphyllum C.DC.
- Piper eucalyptolimbum C.DC.
- Piper eupodum C.DC.
- Piper euryphyllum C.DC.
- Piper eustylum Diels
- Piper evasum Trel.
- Piper evingeri Yunck.
- Piper evulsipilosum Trel.
- Piper ewanii Yunck.
- Piper exactum Trel. & Standl.
- Piper exasperatum Vahl
- Piper excavatum Ruiz & Pav.
- Piper excelsum G.Forst.
- Piper excessum Trel.
- Piper exiguicaule Yunck.
- Piper exiguispicum Trel.
- Piper expolitum Trel.
- Piper externum Trel.

== F ==
- Piper factum Trel.
- Piper fadyenii C.DC.
- Piper faecatum Trel.
- Piper fagifolium Trel.
- Piper falanense Trel. & Yunck.
- Piper falcifolium Trel.
- Piper falcigerum Trel.
- Piper falcispicum Yunck.
- Piper falconeri C.DC.
- Piper falculispicum Trel. & Yunck.
- Piper fallax Vahl
- Piper fallenii A.H.Gentry
- Piper fallens Trel.
- Piper fanshawei Yunck.
- Piper faroense Yunck.
- Piper fastiditum Trel. & Yunck.
- Piper faviculiferum Trel.
- Piper ferreyrae Yunck.
- Piper ferriei C.DC.
- Piper figlinum Trel.
- Piper filiferum Aver.
- Piper filipedunculum C.DC.
- Piper filipes C.DC.
- Piper filiramosum Callejas
- Piper filistilum C.DC.
- Piper fimbrirachium Callejas
- Piper fimbriulatum C.DC.
- Piper firmifolium Trel.
- Piper firmolimbum C.DC.
- Piper fischerianum C.DC.
- Piper flagellicuspe Trel. & Yunck.
- Piper flavescens (C.DC.) Trel.
- Piper flavibaccum C.DC.
- Piper flavicans C.DC.
- Piper flavidum C.DC.
- Piper flavifructum Trel.
- Piper flaviramum C.DC.
- Piper flavispicum C.DC.
- Piper flavoviride C.DC.
- Piper flexuosum Rudge
- Piper fluminense Raddi
- Piper fonteboanum Yunck.
- Piper foreroi A.H.Gentry
- Piper formici-tolerans Trel.
- Piper formosum (Miq.) C.DC.
- Piper forstenii C.DC.
- Piper fortalezanum Trel.
- Piper fortunaense Tebbs
- Piper fortunyoanum Trel.
- Piper forzzae G.A.Queiroz & E.F.Guim.
- Piper fragile Benth.
- Piper fragiliforme C.DC.
- Piper fragrans Trel.
- Piper fraguanum Trel.
- Piper francovilleanum C.DC.
- Piper fresnoense Trel. & Yunck.
- Piper friedrichsthalii C.DC.
- Piper frioense Standl. & Steyerm.
- Piper froesii Yunck.
- Piper frostii Trel. ex Callejas
- Piper frustratum (Miq.) Boerl.
- Piper fuertesii C.DC.
- Piper fulgentifolium Yunck.
- Piper fulgidum Yunck.
- Piper fuligineum (Kunth) Steud.
- Piper fuliginosum Sodiro
- Piper fulvescenticaule Trel.
- Piper funckii C.DC.
- Piper fundacionense Steyerm.
- Piper fungiforme Spokes
- Piper fusagasuganum Trel. & Yunck.
- Piper fuscescentispicum C.DC.
- Piper fuscinervium Quisumb.
- Piper fuscispicum Trel.
- Piper fuscobracteatum Trel.
- Piper futuri Trel. & Yunck.

== G ==
- Piper galeatum (Miq.) C.DC.
- Piper galicianum Steyerm.
- Piper gallatlyi C.DC.
- Piper gamboanum (C.DC.) C.DC.
- Piper garagaranum C.DC.
- Piper gatunense Trel.
- Piper gaudichaudianum (Kunth) Kunth ex Steud.
- Piper gaumeri Trel.
- Piper generalense Trel.
- Piper geniculatum Sw.
- Piper gentlei Trel.
- Piper gentryi Steyerm.
- Piper genuflexum Trel.
- Piper georginum Trel. & Standl.
- Piper gerardoi Callejas
- Piper gerritii Callejas
- Piper gibbiflorum C.DC.
- Piper gibbilimbum C.DC.
- Piper gibbosum C.DC.
- Piper gigas Trel.
- Piper gilvescens Trel.
- Piper gilvibaccum Trel.
- Piper giordanoi E.F.Guim. & D.Monteiro
- Piper glaberrimum C.DC.
- Piper glabratum (Kunth) Steud.
- Piper glabrescens (Miq.) C.DC.
- Piper glabribaccum Trel.
- Piper glabribracteum Yunck.
- Piper glabrifolium C.DC.
- Piper glabrius Trel.
- Piper glanduligerum C.DC.
- Piper glandulosissimum Yunck.
- Piper globirhachis M.A.Jaram.
- Piper globulantherum C.DC.
- Piper globulistigmum C.DC.
- Piper goeldii C.DC.
- Piper goesii Yunck.
- Piper golfitoense Callejas
- Piper gonagricum Trel.
- Piper gonocarpum Trel.
- Piper gorgonillense Trel. & Yunck.
- Piper gracile Ruiz & Pav.
- Piper gracilipes C.DC.
- Piper graciliramosum Yunck.
- Piper grande Vahl
- Piper grandilimbum C.DC.
- Piper grandispicum C.DC.
- Piper grantii Yunck.
- Piper granulatum Trel.
- Piper granuligerum Trel.
- Piper gratum Trel.
- Piper graveolens C.DC.
- Piper grayumii Callejas
- Piper griffithii C.DC.
- Piper griseocaule Trel.
- Piper griseolimbum Trel. & Yunck.
- Piper griseopubens Trel.
- Piper griseum C.DC.
- Piper guacimonum (C.DC.) Trel.
- Piper guahamense C.DC.
- Piper gualeanum Sodiro ex C.DC.
- Piper guanacostense C.DC.
- Piper guanahacabibense Borhidi
- Piper guapense Yunck.
- Piper guatemalense Callejas
- Piper guatopoense Yunck.
- Piper guazacapanense Trel. & Standl.
- Piper guedesii C.DC.
- Piper guianense (Klotzsch) C.DC.
- Piper guineense Schumach. & Thonn.
- Piper gurupanum Yunck.
- Piper gutierrezii Yunck.
- Piper gymnocladum C.DC.
- Piper gymnophyllum C.DC.

== H ==
- Piper hainanense Hemsl.
- Piper halconense C.DC.
- Piper halesiifolium (Kunth) Kunth ex Steud.
- Piper hamiltonii C.DC.
- Piper hammelii Callejas
- Piper hancei Maxim.
- Piper harlingii Yunck.
- Piper harmandii C.DC.
- Piper hartii C.DC.
- Piper hartwegianum (Benth.) C.DC.
- Piper hassleri C.DC.
- Piper hatschbachii Yunck.
- Piper haughtii Trel. & Yunck.
- Piper havilandii C.DC.
- Piper hayneanum C.DC.
- Piper hebetifolium W.C.Burger
- Piper hederaceum (Miq.) C.DC.
- Piper heimii C.DC.
- Piper hemmendorffii C.DC.
- Piper heptandrum (Miq.) C.DC.
- Piper hermannii Trel. & Yunck.
- Piper hermes Trel. & Standl.
- Piper hermosanum Yunck.
- Piper herrerae Trel.
- Piper heterobracteum Steyerm.
- Piper heterocarpum Trel.
- Piper heterophyllum Ruiz & Pav.
- Piper heterotrichum C.DC.
- Piper heydei C.DC.
- Piper hians Trel.
- Piper hieronymi C.DC.
- Piper hillianum C.DC.
- Piper hippocrepiforme Steyerm.
- Piper hirtellipetiolum C.DC.
- Piper hirtellum Raddi
- Piper hirtilimbum Trel. & Yunck.
- Piper hirtovarium C.DC.
- Piper hispidiramum C.DC.
- Piper hispidiseptum Trel.
- Piper hispidum Sw.
- Piper hochiense Y.C.Tseng
- Piper hodgei Yunck.
- Piper hoehnei Yunck.
- Piper hoffmannseggianum Schult.
- Piper holdridgeanum W.C.Burger
- Piper holguinianum Trel.
- Piper hollrungii K.Schum. & Lauterb.
- Piper holstii Callejas
- Piper holtii Trel. & Yunck.
- Piper holtonii C.DC.
- Piper hondonadense Trel. & Yunck.
- Piper hongkongense C.DC.
- Piper hooglandii (I.Hutton & P.S.Green) M.A.Jaram.
- Piper hookeri Miq.
- Piper hookerianum (Miq.) C.DC.
- Piper hosei C.DC.
- Piper hosokawae Fosberg
- Piper hostmannianum (Miq.) C.DC.
- Piper hoyoscardozii W.Trujillo-C. & M.A.Jaram.
- Piper huacachianum Trel.
- Piper huacapistanum Trel.
- Piper huallaganum Trel.
- Piper huantanum Trel.
- Piper huigranum Trel. & Yunck.
- Piper huilanum C.DC.
- Piper humaytanum Yunck.
- Piper humillimum C.DC.
- Piper humistratum Görts & K.U.Kramer
- Piper humoense Trel.
- Piper humorigaudens Trel.
- Piper hydrolapathum C.DC.
- Piper hylebates C.DC.
- Piper hylophilum C.DC.
- Piper hymenophyllum Miq.
- Piper hymenopodum Sodiro
- Piper hypoglaucum Miq.
- Piper hypoleucum Sodiro

== I ==
- Piper ilheusense Yunck.
- Piper illautum Trel.
- Piper imberbe Trel. & Standl.
- Piper immite Trel.
- Piper immutatum Trel.
- Piper imparipes Trel.
- Piper imperiale (Miq.) C.DC.
- Piper imperspicuibracteum Trel.
- Piper impube Trel.
- Piper inaequale C.DC.
- Piper inauspicatum Trel.
- Piper inclemens Trel. & Yunck.
- Piper incomptum Trel.
- Piper indecorum (Kunth) Kunth ex Steud.
- Piper indianonum Trel.
- Piper indiciflexum Trel.
- Piper indicum C.DC.
- Piper indignum Trel.
- Piper indiwasii W.Trujillo-C. & M.A.Jaram.
- Piper infossibaccatum A.Huang
- Piper infossum Y.C.Tseng
- Piper infraluteum Trel.
- Piper inhorrescens Trel.
- Piper injucundum Trel.
- Piper insectifugum C.DC. ex Seem.
- Piper insignilaminum Trel. & Yunck.
- Piper insignilimbum C.DC.
- Piper insipiens Trel. & Yunck.
- Piper insolens Trel.
- Piper instabilipes Trel.
- Piper insulicola Trel.
- Piper interitum Trel.
- Piper internibaccum C.DC.
- Piper internovarium C.DC.
- Piper interruptum Opiz
- Piper intonsum Trel.
- Piper intramarginatum Callejas
- Piper iquitosense Trel.
- Piper irazuanum C.DC.
- Piper irrasum Trel.
- Piper itatiaianum C.DC.
- Piper itayanum Trel.
- Piper ivonense Yunck.
- Piper ixocubvainense Standl. & Steyerm.
- Piper ixtlanense Callejas

== J ==
- Piper jaboncillanum Trel. & Yunck.
- Piper jacaleapaense Callejas
- Piper jacquemontianum (Kunth) Kunth ex Steud.
- Piper jactatum Trel. & Standl.
- Piper jalapense M.Martens & Galeotti
- Piper jaliscanum S.Watson
- Piper japurense (Miq.) C.DC.
- Piper japvonum C.DC.
- Piper jaramilloae G.A.Queiroz & E.F.Guim.
- Piper jauaense Steyerm.
- Piper javariense Yunck.
- Piper javitense Kunth
- Piper jenkinsii C.DC.
- Piper jericoense Trel. & Yunck.
- Piper jianfenglingense C.Y.Hao & Y.H.Tan
- Piper josephii R.Bernal
- Piper jubatum Trel.
- Piper jubimarginatum Yunck.
- Piper julianii Callejas
- Piper juliflorum Nees & Mart.
- Piper jumayense Trel. & Standl.

== K ==
- Piper kadsura (Choisy) Ohwi
- Piper kandavuense A.C.Sm.
- Piper kanehiranum Trel.
- Piper kantetulense Trel.
- Piper kapruanum C.DC.
- Piper karpuragandhum J.Mathew & Yohannan
- Piper karwinskianum (Kunth) Kunth ex Steud.
- Piper kawakamii Hayata
- Piper kelleyi Tepe
- Piper kerberi C.DC.
- Piper kerrii Suwanph. & Banchong
- Piper keyanum C.DC.
- Piper khaoyaiense Suwanph. & D.A.Simpson
- Piper khasianum C.DC.
- Piper killipii Trel.
- Piper kimpitirikianum Trel.
- Piper kleinii Yunck.
- Piper klossii Ridl.
- Piper klotzschianum (Kunth) C.DC.
- Piper klugianum Trel.
- Piper klugii Yunck.
- Piper kongkandanum Suwanph. & Chantar.
- Piper konkintoense Trel.
- Piper koordersii C.DC.
- Piper kotanum C.DC.
- Piper kreangense C.DC.
- Piper krintjingense C.DC.
- Piper krukoffii Yunck.
- Piper kuhlmannii Yunck.
- Piper kunstleri C.DC.
- Piper kunthii (Miq.) C.DC.
- Piper kurgianum P.K.Mukh.
- Piper kurichyarmalanum J.Mathew & P.M.Salim
- Piper kurzii Ridl.
- Piper kwashoense Hayata

== L ==
- Piper labillardierei C.DC.
- Piper lacandonense Callejas
- Piper laceratibracteum Trel.
- Piper lacunosum Kunth
- Piper ladoradense Trel. & Yunck.
- Piper ladrillense Trel.
- Piper laedans Trel.
- Piper laetispicum C.DC.
- Piper laeve Vahl
- Piper laevibracteum Trel.
- Piper laevicarpum Yunck.
- Piper laevigatum Kunth
- Piper lagenibaccum Trel.
- Piper lagoaense C.DC.
- Piper laguna-cochanum Trel. & Yunck.
- Piper lagunaense Trel. & Yunck.
- Piper lainatakanum C.DC.
- Piper lamasense Trel.
- Piper lanatibracteum Trel.
- Piper lanatum Roxb.
- Piper lanceifolium Kunth
- Piper lanceolatum Ruiz & Pav.
- Piper lancetillanum Trel.
- Piper lanciferum Standl. & Steyerm.
- Piper lancilimbum Yunck.
- Piper landakanum C.DC.
- Piper langlassei C.DC.
- Piper lanosibracteum Trel.
- Piper lanosicaule Trel.
- Piper lanyuense K.N.Kung & Kun C.Chang
- Piper laosanum C.DC.
- Piper lapathifolium (Kunth) Steud.
- Piper laperdizense W.Trujillo-C. & M.A.Jaram.
- Piper larutanum C.DC.
- Piper lateoblongum S.Moore
- Piper lateovatum Trel.
- Piper laterifissum Trel.
- Piper lateripilosum Yunck.
- Piper latibracteum C.DC.
- Piper latifolium L.f.
- Piper laurifolium Mill.
- Piper laurinum Roem. & Schult.
- Piper lauterbachii C.DC.
- Piper lawrancei Trel. & Yunck.
- Piper laxivenum C.DC.
- Piper lechlerianum C.DC.
- Piper ledermannii C.DC.
- Piper lehmannianum C.DC.
- Piper lemaense Yunck.
- Piper lempirense Callejas
- Piper lenticellosum C.DC.
- Piper lepidotum D.Parodi
- Piper leptocladum C.DC.
- Piper leptoneuron C.DC.
- Piper leptostilum C.DC.
- Piper lepturum (Kunth) Kunth ex Steud.
- Piper lessertianum (Miq.) C.DC.
- Piper leticianum C.DC.
- Piper leucophaeocaule Trel.
- Piper leucophaeum Trel.
- Piper leucophlebium Trel.
- Piper leucophyllum (Miq.) C.DC.
- Piper leucostachyum Trel. & Yunck.
- Piper levilimbum Trel.
- Piper lhotzkyanum (Kunth) Kunth ex Steud.
- Piper liebmannii C.DC.
- Piper limae Yunck.
- Piper limosum Yunck.
- Piper lincolnense Trel.
- Piper lindbergii C.DC.
- Piper lindenianum C.DC.
- Piper lindenii (Miq.) C.DC.
- Piper linearifolium C.DC.
- Piper lineativillosum Trel. & Yunck.
- Piper lineatum Ruiz & Pav.
- Piper lineolatifolium Trel. & Yunck.
- Piper lingshuiense Y.C.Tseng
- Piper linguliforme Steyerm.
- Piper lippoldii Saralegui
- Piper littlei Yunck.
- Piper littorale C.DC.
- Piper llatanum Trel.
- Piper loefgrenii Yunck.
- Piper longamentum C.DC.
- Piper longeacuminatum Trel.
- Piper longepetiolatum (C.DC.) Trel.
- Piper longestamineum Trel.
- Piper longestylosum C.DC.
- Piper longiappendiculatum Steyerm.
- Piper longiauriculatum Yunck.
- Piper longicaudatum Trel. & Yunck.
- Piper longicaule C.DC.
- Piper longichaetum Yunck.
- Piper longifilamentum C.DC.
- Piper longifolium Ruiz & Pav.
- Piper longimucronatum Yunck.
- Piper longipedicellatum Quisumb.
- Piper longipes C.DC.
- Piper longipilosum C.DC.
- Piper longipilum C.DC.
- Piper longispicum C.DC.
- Piper longistigmum C.DC.
- Piper longistipulum C.DC.
- Piper longivaginans C.DC.
- Piper longum L.
- Piper loretoanum Trel.
- Piper losoense Trel. & Yunck.
- Piper lucigaudens C.DC.
- Piper lundellianum Trel.
- Piper lundellii Trel.
- Piper lundii C.DC.
- Piper lunulibracteatum C.DC.
- Piper lutescens C.DC.
- Piper luxii C.DC.

== M ==
- Piper macapaense Yunck.
- Piper macbrideanum Trel.
- Piper macedoi Yunck.
- Piper macerispicum Trel. & Yunck.
- Piper machadoanum C.DC.
- Piper machoense Callejas
- Piper machucanum Trel.
- Piper machupicchuense Trel.
- Piper macrocarpum C.DC.
- Piper macropiper Pennant
- Piper macropodum C.DC.
- Piper macropunctatum Yunck.
- Piper macrorhynchon (Miq.) C.DC.
- Piper macrostylum C.DC.
- Piper macrotrichum C.DC.
- Piper macrourum Kunth
- Piper maculatum Blume
- Piper madagascariense (Miq.) C.DC.
- Piper madeiranum Yunck.
- Piper magen B.Q.Cheng ex C.L.Long & Jun Yang bis
- Piper magnantherum C.DC.
- Piper magnificum L.Gentil ex Trel.
- Piper magnifolium (C.DC.) Trel.
- Piper magnilimbum C.DC.
- Piper maingayi Hook.f.
- Piper majense Callejas
- Piper majusculum Blume
- Piper makruense C.DC.
- Piper malacocarpum K.Schum. & Lauterb.
- Piper malacophyllum (C.Presl) C.DC.
- Piper malgassicum Papini, Palchetti, M.Gori & Rota Nodari
- Piper malifolium Trel.
- Piper mamorense Yunck.
- Piper manabinum C.DC.
- Piper mananthum C.Wright
- Piper manausense Yunck.
- Piper mansericheanum Trel.
- Piper manzanillanum C.DC.
- Piper mapirense C.DC.
- Piper maraccasense Trel.
- Piper maranyonense Trel.
- Piper marequitense C.DC.
- Piper margaretae Trel.
- Piper margaritatum Trel.
- Piper marginatum Jacq.
- Piper marginecontinuum Callejas
- Piper marquetei G.A.Queiroz, E.F.Guim. & Sarnaglia
- Piper marsupiiferum Trel.
- Piper martensianum C.DC.
- Piper martinellii G.A.Queiroz & E.F.Guim.
- Piper martinense Trel.
- Piper marturetense Trel. & Yunck.
- Piper massiei C.DC.
- Piper mastersianum C.DC.
- Piper matanganum C.DC.
- Piper matinanum C.DC.
- Piper matthewsii C.DC.
- Piper matudae Lundell
- Piper maxonii C.DC.
- Piper maxwellianum C.DC.
- Piper mayanum Lundell
- Piper mazamariense Yunck.
- Piper mcphersonii Callejas
- Piper mcvaughii Bornst.
- Piper medinaense Yunck.
- Piper medinillifolium Quisumb.
- Piper mediocre C.DC.
- Piper meeboldii C.DC.
- Piper melanocaulon Quisumb.
- Piper melanocladum C.DC.
- Piper melanopremnum Trel. & Ekman
- Piper melanostachyum C.DC.
- Piper melanostictum (Miq.) C.DC.
- Piper melastomoides Schltdl. & Cham.
- Piper melchior (Sykes) M.A.Jaram.
- Piper mellibracteum Trel.
- Piper membranaceum C.DC.
- Piper mendezense Yunck.
- Piper mercedense Trel.
- Piper mercens Yunck.
- Piper meritum Trel.
- Piper merrillii C.DC.
- Piper mestonii F.M.Bailey
- Piper metallicum Hallier f.
- Piper metanum Trel. & Yunck.
- Piper methysticum G.Forst.
- Piper mexiae Trel. & Yunck.
- Piper mexicanum (Miq.) C.DC.
- Piper michelianum C.DC.
- Piper michelineae G.A.Queiroz & E.F.Guim.
- Piper micoense Trel.
- Piper micranthera C.DC.
- Piper microstigma (Miq.) C.DC.
- Piper microtrichum C.DC.
- Piper middlesexense Trel. ex Callejas
- Piper miersinum (Miq.) C.DC.
- Piper miguel-conejoanum Trel. & Yunck.
- Piper mikanianum (Kunth) Steud.
- Piper mikaniifolium Trel.
- Piper mikii M.Hiroe
- Piper milciadesii Trel. & Yunck.
- Piper millegranum Yunck.
- Piper millepunctulatum Trel. & Yunck.
- Piper minasarum Steyerm.
- Piper minutantherum C.DC.
- Piper minuteauriculatum Callejas
- Piper minutescabiosum Trel.
- Piper minutiflorum Callejas
- Piper minutistigmum C.DC.
- Piper miquelianum C.DC.
- Piper mischocarpum Y.C.Tseng
- Piper mishuyacuense Trel.
- Piper mite Ruiz & Pav.
- Piper mitifolium Trel.
- Piper mituense Trel. & Yunck.
- Piper mocco-mocco Trel.
- Piper mocoanum Trel. & Yunck.
- Piper moense C.DC.
- Piper mohomoho C.DC.
- Piper mollicomum Kunth ex Steud.
- Piper mollipilosum C.DC.
- Piper mollissimum Blume
- Piper molliusculum Sodiro
- Piper monagasense Yunck.
- Piper monostigmum C.DC.
- Piper montanum C.DC.
- Piper montealegreanum Yunck.
- Piper monteluctans Trel.
- Piper monteverdeanum C.DC.
- Piper monteverdense Callejas
- Piper montium C.DC.
- Piper montivagum Ridl.
- Piper monurum Trel. & Yunck.
- Piper monzonense C.DC.
- Piper moreiranum G.A.Queiroz & E.F.Guim.
- Piper moreletii C.DC.
- Piper morelianum Yunck.
- Piper morianum Trel.
- Piper morilloi Steyerm.
- Piper moringanum E.F.Guim. & Carv.-Silva
- Piper morisonianum C.DC.
- Piper mornicola C.DC.
- Piper mosaicum Steyerm.
- Piper moscopanense Yunck.
- Piper motuoense X.W.Qin, F.Su & C.Y.Hao
- Piper mourae Yunck.
- Piper moyobambanum Trel.
- Piper mucronatum C.DC.
- Piper mucronulatum Blume
- Piper muelleri C.DC.
- Piper multiforme Trel. & Yunck.
- Piper multimammosum Trel.
- Piper multinodum C.DC.
- Piper multiplinervium C.DC.
- Piper multistigmum C.DC.
- Piper multitudinis Trel.
- Piper muluense O.Schwartz
- Piper munchanum C.DC.
- Piper mundum Trel.
- Piper muneyporense C.DC.
- Piper munyanum Trel.
- Piper muricatum Blume
- Piper murrayanum C.DC.
- Piper musteum Trel.
- Piper mutabile C.DC.
- Piper mutisii Trel. & Yunck.
- Piper myrmecophilum C.DC.

== N ==
- Piper nagaense C.DC.
- Piper nagelii C.DC.
- Piper nanayanum Trel.
- Piper napo-pastazanum Trel. & Yunck.
- Piper narinoense Yunck.
- Piper nasutum Trel.
- Piper neblinanum Yunck.
- Piper nebuligaudens Yunck.
- Piper neesianum C.DC.
- Piper neglectum Trel.
- Piper negritosense Trel.
- Piper negroense C.DC.
- Piper nematanthera C.DC.
- Piper neovenezuelense (Steyerm.) M.A.Jaram.
- Piper nervulosum C.DC.
- Piper neurostachyum C.DC.
- Piper nicaraguense Callejas
- Piper nicoyanum C.DC.
- Piper nigribaccum C.DC.
- Piper nigricaule Trel.
- Piper nigriconnectivum C.DC.
- Piper nigrispicum C.DC.
- Piper nigropunctatum C.DC.
- Piper nigroramum C.DC.
- Piper nigrovirens C.DC.
- Piper nigrum L.
- Piper niteroiense Yunck.
- Piper nitidifolium C.DC.
- Piper nitidulifolium Trel.
- Piper nobile C.DC.
- Piper nodosum C.DC.
- Piper nokaidoyitau W.Trujillo-C. & M.A.Jaram.
- Piper non-retrorsum Trel.
- Piper noveninervium C.DC.
- Piper novogalicianum Bornst.
- Piper novogranatense C.DC.
- Piper nubigenum (Kunth) Kunth ex Steud.
- Piper nudibaccatum Y.C.Tseng
- Piper nudifolium C.DC.
- Piper nudilimbum C.DC.
- Piper nudipedunculum C.DC.
- Piper nudiramum C.DC.
- Piper nudispicuum C.DC.
- Piper nudum C.DC.
- Piper numinica Callejas
- Piper nuncupatum Trel.

== O ==
- Piper oaxacanum C.DC.
- Piper obaldianum C.DC.
- Piper obatense O.Schwartz
- Piper obesispicum S.Moore
- Piper obiter-sericeum Trel.
- Piper oblanceolatum Trel.
- Piper oblancifolium Yunck.
- Piper obliqueovatum Trel.
- Piper obliquum Ruiz & Pav.
- Piper oblongatifolium Trel.
- Piper oblongatilimbum Trel.
- Piper oblongatum Opiz
- Piper oblongifructum Callejas
- Piper oblongum Kunth
- Piper obovantherum C.DC.
- Piper obovatifolium Trel.
- Piper obrutum Trel. & Yunck.
- Piper obscurifolium Callejas
- Piper obsessum Trel.
- Piper obtusilimbum C.DC.
- Piper obtusissimum Miq.
- Piper obtusistigmum C.DC.
- Piper obtusum C.DC.
- Piper obumbratifolium Trel.
- Piper obumbratum (Miq.) C.DC.
- Piper occultum Trel.
- Piper ocosingosense Callejas
- Piper oculatispicum Trel.
- Piper odoratum C.DC.
- Piper offensum Trel.
- Piper okamotoi M.Hiroe
- Piper oldhamii C.DC.
- Piper ollantaitambanum Trel.
- Piper omega Trel.
- Piper onus Trel.
- Piper opacibracteum Trel.
- Piper operosum Trel.
- Piper opizianum Fürnr.
- Piper oradendron Trel. & Standl.
- Piper oreophilum Ridl.
- Piper orizabanum C.DC.
- Piper ornatispicum Trel.
- Piper ornatum N.E.Br.
- Piper ornithorhynchum Trel.
- Piper oroense Yunck.
- Piper orosianum Trel.
- Piper orthostachyum (Kunth) Kunth ex Steud.
- Piper ospinense Trel. & Yunck.
- Piper ostii Trel.
- Piper oteguanum W.Trujillo-C. & M.A.Jaram.
- Piper otophorum C.DC.
- Piper otto-huberi Steyerm.
- Piper ottoniifolium C.DC.
- Piper ottonoides Yunck.
- Piper ovalifructum J.Mathew & P.M.Salim
- Piper ovantherum C.DC.
- Piper ovatibaccum C.DC.
- Piper ovatilimbum C.DC.
- Piper ovatistigmum C.DC.
- Piper ovatum Vahl
- Piper oviedoi Urb.
- Piper oxycarpum C.DC.
- Piper oxyphyllum C.DC.
- Piper oxystachyum C.DC.

== P ==
- Piper pacacanum Trel.
- Piper pachoanum C.DC.
- Piper pachyarthrum K.Schum.
- Piper pachyphloium C.DC.
- Piper pachyphyllum Baker
- Piper padangense C.DC.
- Piper paganicum Trel.
- Piper palenquense Callejas
- Piper palestinanum Trel. & Yunck.
- Piper pallidibracteum C.DC.
- Piper pallididorsum Trel.
- Piper pallidifolium C.DC.
- Piper pallidilimbum C.DC.
- Piper pallidirubrum C.DC.
- Piper palmanum Trel.
- Piper palmasanum C.DC.
- Piper palmeri C.DC.
- Piper paludis Callejas
- Piper paludosum C.DC.
- Piper pamploanum Trel. & Yunck.
- Piper panamense C.DC.
- Piper pandoense Yunck.
- Piper pansamalanum C.DC.
- Piper pantjarense C.DC.
- Piper papillicarpum Trel.
- Piper papilliferum Steyerm.
- Piper papulaecaule Trel.
- Piper papulatum Trel.
- Piper paraense (Miq.) C.DC.
- Piper paraguassuanum C.DC.
- Piper paraisense Trel.
- Piper paralaevigatum Trel.
- Piper paramaribense C.DC.
- Piper paranum Yunck.
- Piper parapeltobryon Trel.
- Piper parcirameum C.DC.
- Piper parcum Trel. & Yunck.
- Piper parianum Yunck.
- Piper parmatum Dressler
- Piper parong Quisumb.
- Piper partiticuspe Trel.
- Piper parvantherum C.DC.
- Piper parvicordulatum Trel.
- Piper parvipedunculum C.DC.
- Piper parviramosum Callejas
- Piper pastasanum Diels
- Piper patens Opiz
- Piper patentifolium Trel.
- Piper patulum Bertol.
- Piper patzulinum Trel. & Standl.
- Piper paucartamboanum Trel.
- Piper paucinerve C.DC.
- Piper paucipilosum Yunck.
- Piper pauciramosum Yunck.
- Piper paucistigmum C.DC.
- Piper paulianifolium Trel.
- Piper pavasense Trel.
- Piper pavimentifolium Trel.
- Piper pavonii (Miq.) C.DC.
- Piper payanum Yunck.
- Piper pearcei Yunck.
- Piper pebasense Trel.
- Piper peculiare Trel. & Yunck.
- Piper pedicellare C.DC.
- Piper pedicellatum C.DC.
- Piper pedunculatum C.DC.
- Piper peepuloides Roxb.
- Piper pellitum C.DC.
- Piper peltatifolium C.Y.Hao, H.S.Wu & Y.H.Tan
- Piper peltatum L.
- Piper peltifolium Callejas
- Piper peltilimbum Yunck.
- Piper penangense (Miq.) C.DC.
- Piper pendens Trel.
- Piper pendentispicum Trel. & Yunck.
- Piper pendulirameum Trel. & Yunck.
- Piper pendulispicum C.DC.
- Piper pentagonum Trel.
- Piper pentandrum C.DC.
- Piper penyasense Trel. & Yunck.
- Piper peracuminatum C.DC.
- Piper perareolatum C.DC.
- Piper perbarbatum C.DC.
- Piper perbrevicaule Yunck.
- Piper perbrevispicum Yunck.
- Piper perciliatum Trel. & Yunck.
- Piper percostatum Yunck.
- Piper perditum Trel.
- Piper perenense Trel.
- Piper perfugii Trel.
- Piper pergamentifolium Trel. & Standl.
- Piper pergeniculatum Trel.
- Piper perhispidum C.DC.
- Piper perijaense Steyerm.
- Piper perinaequilongum Trel.
- Piper perlasense Yunck.
- Piper perlongipedunculum Trel. & Standl.
- Piper permolle Trel. & Yunck.
- Piper permucronatum Yunck.
- Piper perpallidum Ekman, Urb. & Trel.
- Piper perpilosum C.DC.
- Piper perpurgatum Trel.
- Piper perpusillum Callejas
- Piper perscabrifolium Yunck.
- Piper perstipulare Steyerm.
- Piper perstrigosum Yunck.
- Piper persubulatum C.DC.
- Piper pertinax Trel. & Yunck.
- Piper pertomentellum Trel. & Yunck.
- Piper pertractatum Trel.
- Piper peruligerum Trel.
- Piper pervelutinum Trel.
- Piper pervenosum C.DC.
- Piper pervenulosum Yunck.
- Piper perverrucosum Trel. & Yunck.
- Piper pervicax Trel.
- Piper pervillosum Trel.
- Piper pervulgatum Trel.
- Piper pervulsum Trel. & Yunck.
- Piper petens Trel.
- Piper petiolare C.DC.
- Piper petiolatum C.DC.
- Piper pexum Trel.
- Piper phaeophyllum Trel. & Standl.
- Piper phalangense C.DC.
- Piper phanerolepidum Trel.
- Piper phaneropus Trel.
- Piper phangngaense Suwanph. & Hodk.
- Piper philippinum Miq.
- Piper philodendon Ridl.
- Piper philodendroides Standl. & Steyerm.
- Piper phuwuaense Chaveer. & Tanee
- Piper phyllostictum (Miq.) C.DC.
- Piper phytolaccifolium Opiz
- Piper picardae C.DC.
- Piper picobonitoense F.G.Coe & Bornst.
- Piper piedadesense Trel.
- Piper piedecuestanum Trel. & Yunck.
- Piper pileatum Trel.
- Piper pilgeri C.DC.
- Piper pilibracteum Trel. & Yunck.
- Piper piliovarium Yunck.
- Piper pilirameum C.DC.
- Piper pilosissimum Yunck.
- Piper pilosiusculum Opiz
- Piper pilovarium Yunck.
- Piper piluliferifolium Trel. & Yunck.
- Piper piluliferum Kunth
- Piper pinaresanum Trel. & Yunck.
- Piper pinedoana Trel.
- Piper pinetorum Standl. & Steyerm.
- Piper pingbienense Y.C.Tseng
- Piper pinguifolium C.DC.
- Piper pinoganense Trel.
- Piper pinuna-negroense Trel. & Yunck.
- Piper piojoanum Trel. & Yunck.
- Piper piresii Yunck.
- Piper piscatorum Trel. & Yunck.
- Piper pitalitoense Yunck.
- Piper pittieri C.DC.
- Piper plagiophyllum K.Schum. & Lauterb.
- Piper planadosense Trel. & Standl.
- Piper planipes Trel.
- Piper planitiei Trel. & Yunck.
- Piper platylobum Sodiro
- Piper playa-blancanum Trel.
- Piper plumanum C.DC.
- Piper plumbeicolor Trel.
- Piper plurinervosum Yunck.
- Piper poasanum C.DC.
- Piper poeppigii (Kunth) Steud.
- Piper pogonioneuron Trel. & Standl.
- Piper poiteanum Steud.
- Piper politaereum Trel.
- Piper politifolium C.DC.
- Piper politii Yunck.
- Piper politum C.DC.
- Piper polyneurum C.DC.
- Piper polysyphonum C.DC.
- Piper polytrichum C.DC.
- Piper ponapense C.DC.
- Piper ponendum Trel.
- Piper ponesheense C.DC.
- Piper ponganum Trel.
- Piper pontis Trel.
- Piper popayanense C.DC.
- Piper poporense Trel. & Yunck.
- Piper populifolium Opiz
- Piper porphyrophyllum (Lindl. ex Blandy) N.E.Br.
- Piper porrectum C.DC.
- Piper portobellense C.DC.
- Piper porveniricola Trel.
- Piper poscitum Trel. & Yunck.
- Piper positum Trel.
- Piper postelsianum Maxim.
- Piper posusanum Trel.
- Piper potamophilum Trel. & Yunck.
- Piper pothoides (Miq.) Wall. ex C.DC.
- Piper pothophyllum Trel.
- Piper praeacutilimbum C.DC.
- Piper praemollitum Trel.
- Piper praesagium Trel. & Yunck.
- Piper premnospicum Tebbs
- Piper prianamense C.DC.
- Piper prietoi Yunck.
- Piper prismaticum C.DC.
- Piper procerifolium C.DC.
- Piper procerum Trel.
- Piper prodigum Trel.
- Piper protracticuspidatum Trel. & Yunck.
- Piper protractispicum C.DC.
- Piper protractum C.DC.
- Piper provulgatum Trel. & Yunck.
- Piper prunifolium J.Jacq.
- Piper pseudamboinense C.DC.
- Piper pseudoacreanum Steyerm.
- Piper pseudoaduncum C.DC.
- Piper pseudoaequale Steyerm.
- Piper pseudoalbuginiferum Trel.
- Piper pseudoarboreum Yunck.
- Piper pseudoasperifolium C.DC.
- Piper pseudobarbatum C.DC.
- Piper pseudobredemeyeri Steyerm.
- Piper pseudobumbratum C.DC.
- Piper pseudocallosum Trel.
- Piper pseudocativalense Trel.
- Piper pseudodelectans Callejas
- Piper pseudodilatatum C.DC.
- Piper pseudodivulgatum Steyerm.
- Piper pseudoeucalyptifolium Trel. & Yunck.
- Piper pseudofallens Callejas
- Piper pseudofimbriulatum Trel.
- Piper pseudoflexuosum Trel.
- Piper pseudofuligineum C.DC.
- Piper pseudogaragaranum Trel.
- Piper pseudoglabrifolium Trel.
- Piper pseudogrande Yunck.
- Piper pseudohastulatum Steyerm.
- Piper pseudolanceifolium Trel.
- Piper pseudolindenii C.DC.
- Piper pseudomatico Trel.
- Piper pseudomunchanum Trel.
- Piper pseudonigrum C.DC.
- Piper pseudopeculiare W.Trujillo-C.
- Piper pseudopedicellatum P.K.Mukh.
- Piper pseudoperbrevicaule Callejas
- Piper pseudoperfugii Callejas
- Piper pseudoperuvianum C.DC.
- Piper pseudopopayanense Trel. & Yunck.
- Piper pseudopothifolium C.DC.
- Piper pseudoschippianum Callejas
- Piper pseudovariabile Trel.
- Piper pseudoviridicaule Trel.
- Piper pseudovulgatum Steyerm.
- Piper psilophyllum C.DC.
- Piper psilorhachis C.DC.
- Piper psilostachyum Kunth
- Piper psittacorum Endl.
- Piper pterocladum C.DC.
- Piper pubarulipes C.DC.
- Piper pubens Trel.
- Piper puberulescens Trel.
- Piper puberuliciliatum Yunck.
- Piper puberulidrupum Yunck.
- Piper puberulilimbum C.DC.
- Piper puberulinerva C.DC.
- Piper puberulirameum C.DC.
- Piper puberulispicum C.DC.
- Piper puberulum (Benth.) Seem.
- Piper pubibaccum C.DC.
- Piper pubicatulum C.DC.
- Piper pubinerve C.DC.
- Piper pubinervulum C.DC.
- Piper pubiovarium Yunck.
- Piper pubipedunculum C.DC.
- Piper pubipes C.DC.
- Piper pubirhache C.DC.
- Piper pubistipulum C.DC.
- Piper pubisubmarginalum Yunck.
- Piper pubivaginatum Steyerm.
- Piper puente-altoanum Trel.
- Piper puerense C.Y.Hao & F.Su
- Piper pulchrum C.DC.
- Piper pulleanum Yunck.
- Piper pullibaccum Trel.
- Piper pullibracteatum Trel.
- Piper pullispicum Trel.
- Piper puncticulatum Ridl.
- Piper punctiunculatum Trel.
- Piper punctulantherum C.DC.
- Piper punctulatum Standl. & Steyerm.
- Piper puniceum Trel.
- Piper puntarenasense Callejas
- Piper puraceanum Trel. & Yunck.
- Piper purdiei C.DC.
- Piper purpusianum Trel.
- Piper purulentum Trel. & Yunck.
- Piper purulhanum C.DC.
- Piper purusanum Yunck.
- Piper pustulatum Yunck.
- Piper pustulicaule Trel.
- Piper putumayoense Trel. & Yunck.
- Piper puyoense Yunck.
- Piper pygmaeum Yunck.
- Piper pykarahense C.DC.

== Q ==
- Piper quadratilimbum Trel.
- Piper quicheanum Callejas
- Piper quimirianum Trel.
- Piper quinchasense M.A.Jaram.
- Piper quinqueangulatum Miq.
- Piper quinquenervium Warb.
- Piper quitense C.DC.

== R ==
- Piper raapii C.DC.
- Piper raddianum E.F.Guim., G.A.Queiroz & Delprete
- Piper rafflesii (Miq.) C.DC.
- Piper raizudoanum Trel. & Yunck.
- Piper ramirezii Callejas
- Piper ramosense Yunck.
- Piper ramosii C.DC.
- Piper rarispicum C.DC.
- Piper rarum C.DC.
- Piper rasile Trel.
- Piper recensitum Trel.
- Piper recessum R.O.Gardner
- Piper rechingeri C.DC.
- Piper recreoense Trel.
- Piper rectamentum Trel.
- Piper recuperatum Trel.
- Piper redactum Trel.
- Piper reductipes Trel.
- Piper regale C.DC.
- Piper regnellii (Miq.) C.DC.
- Piper reinwardtianum (Miq.) C.DC.
- Piper reitzii Yunck.
- Piper relaxatum Trel.
- Piper relictum Lekhak, Kambale & S.R.Yadav
- Piper rematense Trel.
- Piper remotinervium Görts
- Piper renitens (Miq.) Yunck.
- Piper reptabundum C.DC.
- Piper resalutatum Trel.
- Piper resinaense W.Trujillo-C.
- Piper restio Trel.
- Piper restrictum Trel.
- Piper retalhuleuense Trel. & Standl.
- Piper reticulatum L.
- Piper reticulosum Opiz
- Piper retrofractum Vahl
- Piper retropilosum C.DC.
- Piper reventazonis Trel.
- Piper rhinostachyum Trel.
- Piper rhizocaule Trel.
- Piper rhodocarpum Trel.
- Piper rhododendrifolium (Kunth) Kunth ex Steud.
- Piper ribesioides Wall.
- Piper richardiifolium (Kunth) Kunth ex Steud.
- Piper ridleyi C.DC.
- Piper rigidomucronatum Callejas
- Piper riitosense Trel. & Yunck.
- Piper rinconense Trel.
- Piper rindjanense C.DC.
- Piper rindu C.DC.
- Piper riocajambrense Trel. & Yunck.
- Piper riocauchosanum Yunck.
- Piper riochiadoense Trel. & Yunck.
- Piper riodocense E.F.Guim. & Carv.-Silva
- Piper rioense Yunck.
- Piper riojanum Trel.
- Piper riomarguanum Trel. & Yunck.
- Piper rionechianum Yunck.
- Piper riozulianum Trel. & Yunck.
- Piper riparense C.DC.
- Piper ripicola C.DC.
- Piper rivi-vetusti Trel.
- Piper rivinoides (Kunth) Kunth ex Steud.
- Piper rizzinii G.A.Queiroz & E.F.Guim.
- Piper roblalense Yunck.
- Piper robleanum Trel. & Yunck.
- Piper robustipedunculum Yunck.
- Piper roemeri C.DC.
- Piper rogaguanum Trel.
- Piper ronaldii Steyerm.
- Piper roqueanum Trel.
- Piper rosei C.DC.
- Piper roseiflorum Callejas
- Piper roseovenulosum Trel.
- Piper rostratum Roxb.
- Piper rothschuhii C.DC.
- Piper rotundibaccum Trel.
- Piper rovirosae C.DC.
- Piper rubiginosum Trel.
- Piper rubramentum C.DC.
- Piper rubribaccum Trel.
- Piper rubrifolium W.Trujillo-C. & M.A.Jaram.
- Piper rubripes Trel.
- Piper rubrospadix Trel.
- Piper rubrovenosum Rodigas
- Piper rubrum C.DC.
- Piper rude Kunth
- Piper rudgeanum (Miq.) C.DC.
- Piper rueckeri K.Schum.
- Piper rufescentibaccum C.DC.
- Piper rufibracteum C.DC.
- Piper rufinerve Opiz
- Piper rufipilum Yunck.
- Piper rufispicum C.DC.
- Piper rufum C.DC.
- Piper rugocarpum Banchong & Suwanph.
- Piper rugosibaccum Trel.
- Piper rugosifolium Trel.
- Piper rugosilimbum Trel.
- Piper rugosum Lam.
- Piper rukshagandhum J.Mathew
- Piper rumicifolium (Miq.) C.DC.
- Piper rumphii (Miq.) C.DC.
- Piper rupicola C.DC.
- Piper rupununianum Trel. & Yunck.
- Piper rusbyi C.DC.
- Piper rusticum Trel. & Yunck.

== S ==
- Piper sabaletasanum Trel. & Yunck.
- Piper sabanaense Yunck.
- Piper sacchamatesense Yunck.
- Piper sagittifer Trel.
- Piper sagittifolium C.DC.
- Piper saldanhae Yunck.
- Piper salentoi Trel. & Yunck.
- Piper salgaranum Trel. & Yunck.
- Piper salicariifolium (Kunth) Kunth ex Steud.
- Piper salicifolium Vahl
- Piper salicinum Opiz
- Piper salicoides Yunck.
- Piper saloyanum Trel. & Yunck.
- Piper samainianum Mabb.
- Piper samanense Urb.
- Piper sambuanum C.DC.
- Piper sampaioi Yunck.
- Piper san-andresense Trel. & Yunck.
- Piper san-juananum Trel.
- Piper san-marcosanum C.DC.
- Piper san-martinense Trel. & Yunck.
- Piper san-miguelense Trel. & Yunck.
- Piper san-nicolasense Trel.
- Piper san-ramonense Trel.
- Piper san-roqueanum Trel.
- Piper san-vicentense Trel. & Yunck.
- Piper sancti-felicis Trel.
- Piper sandemanii Yunck.
- Piper sandianum C.DC.
- Piper sangorianum C.DC.
- Piper sanjuanilloense Callejas
- Piper santa-ritanum Trel.
- Piper santa-rosanum C.DC.
- Piper santae-clarae Standl. & Steyerm.
- Piper sapitense C.DC.
- Piper sapotoanum Trel.
- Piper sapotoyacuense Trel.
- Piper sararense Trel. & Yunck.
- Piper sarasinorum C.DC.
- Piper sarawakanum C.DC.
- Piper sarculatum (Trel.) Callejas
- Piper sarmentosum Roxb.
- Piper satisfactum Trel.
- Piper saurodermum Ortíz-Rodr. & J.R.Carral
- Piper savagii C.DC.
- Piper savanense C.DC.
- Piper scabiosifolium Trel.
- Piper scabrellum Yunck.
- Piper scabridulicaule Trel.
- Piper scabridulilimbum Trel. & Yunck.
- Piper scabrifolium Hook. & Arn.
- Piper scabrilimbum C.DC. ex A.Schroed.
- Piper scabriseptum Trel.
- Piper scabriusculum A.Dietr.
- Piper scalariforme Trel.
- Piper scalarispicum Trel.
- Piper scalpens Trel.
- Piper scandenticaule Yunck.
- Piper scansum Trel. & Yunck.
- Piper schenckii C.DC.
- Piper schiedeanum Steud.
- Piper schippianum Trel. & Standl.
- Piper schizonephros C.DC.
- Piper schlechtendalianum C.DC.
- Piper schlechtendalii Steud.
- Piper schlechteri C.DC.
- Piper schlimii C.DC.
- Piper schmidtii Hook.f.
- Piper schottii (Miq.) C.DC.
- Piper schumannii C.DC.
- Piper schunkeanum Trel.
- Piper schuppii A.H.Gentry
- Piper schwackei C.DC.
- Piper sciaphilum C.DC.
- Piper scintillans Trel.
- Piper scleromyelum C.DC.
- Piper sclerophloeum C.DC.
- Piper scobinifolium Yunck.
- Piper scolopendrifolium Raddi
- Piper scortechinii C.DC.
- Piper scutatum Raddi
- Piper scutilimbum C.DC.
- Piper scutispicum Trel.
- Piper sebastianum Yunck.
- Piper secundum Ruiz & Pav.
- Piper seducentifolium Trel.
- Piper selangorense C.DC.
- Piper semangkoanum C.DC.
- Piper semicordulatum Trel.
- Piper semicrudum Trel.
- Piper semiimmersum C.DC.
- Piper semimetrale C.DC.
- Piper seminervosum Trel. & Yunck.
- Piper seminitidulum Trel.
- Piper semiplenum Trel.
- Piper semitarium Trel. & Yunck.
- Piper semitransparens C.Y.Hao & Y.H.Tan
- Piper semivolubile C.DC.
- Piper semperflorens C.DC.
- Piper senporeiense Yamam.
- Piper sepicola C.DC.
- Piper sepium C.DC.
- Piper septuplinervium (Miq.) C.DC.
- Piper sericeonervosum Trel.
- Piper serotinum Trel.
- Piper serpavillanum Trel.
- Piper serrulatum Yunck.
- Piper setebarraense E.F.Guim. & L.H.P.Costa
- Piper setigerum Trel.
- Piper setosum Trel. & Yunck.
- Piper setulosum Trel.
- Piper sibulanum C.DC.
- Piper sibunense Trel.
- Piper sierra-aroense Steyerm.
- Piper signatum Trel.
- Piper siguatepequense Trel.
- Piper silentvalleyense Ravindran, M.K.Nair & Asokan Nair
- Piper silvaense Yunck.
- Piper silvanorum Trel.
- Piper silvarum C.DC.
- Piper silvicola C.DC.
- Piper silvigaudens Yunck.
- Piper silvimontanum C.DC.
- Piper silvivagum C.DC.
- Piper simile Quisumb.
- Piper simulans Trel.
- Piper simularoideum Callejas
- Piper simulhabitans Trel.
- Piper sintenense Hatus.
- Piper sinuatifolium Trel.
- Piper sinuatispicum Trel.
- Piper sinuclausum Trel.
- Piper sinugaudens C.DC.
- Piper siquirresense Trel.
- Piper sirenasense Callejas
- Piper skutchii Trel. & Yunck.
- Piper smitinandianum Suwanph. & Chantar.
- Piper sneidernii Yunck.
- Piper snethlagei Yunck.
- Piper sociorum Trel. & Yunck.
- Piper sodiroi C.DC.
- Piper sogerense S.Moore
- Piper sogerianum C.DC.
- Piper soledadense Trel.
- Piper solmsianum C.DC.
- Piper solutidrupum Yunck.
- Piper sonadense C.DC.
- Piper sonsonatense Standl. & S.Calderon
- Piper sororium (Miq.) C.DC.
- Piper sorsogonum C.DC.
- Piper sotae Yunck.
- Piper sotobosquense S.M.Niño & Dorr
- Piper spathelliferum Quisumb.
- Piper speratum Trel.
- Piper sperdinum C.DC.
- Piper sphaerocarpum (Griseb.) C.DC. ex C.Wright
- Piper sphaeroides C.DC.
- Piper spicilongum Trel.
- Piper spinacifolium Callejas
- Piper sprengelianum C.DC.
- Piper spruceanum C.DC.
- Piper squalipelliculum Trel.
- Piper squamuliferum C.DC.
- Piper squamulosum C.DC.
- Piper staminodiferum C.DC.
- Piper standleyi Trel.
- Piper statarium Trel. & Yunck.
- Piper steinbachii Yunck.
- Piper stellipilum (Miq.) C.DC.
- Piper stenocarpum C.DC.
- Piper stenocladophorum Trel.
- Piper stenocladum C.DC.
- Piper stenopodum C.DC.
- Piper stenostachys C.DC.
- Piper sternii Yunck.
- Piper stevensii Trel.
- Piper steyermarkii Yunck.
- Piper stileferum Yunck.
- Piper stillans Trel. & Standl.
- Piper stipitiforme C.C.Chang ex Y.C.Tseng
- Piper stipulaceum Opiz
- Piper stipulare A.C.Sm.
- Piper stipulosum Sodiro
- Piper stomachicum C.DC.
- Piper storkii Trel.
- Piper striaticaule Yunck.
- Piper striatifolium Yunck.
- Piper striatipetiolum Yunck.
- Piper strictifolium D.Monteiro & E.F.Guim.
- Piper strigillosicaule Trel.
- Piper strigillosum Trel.
- Piper strigosum Trel.
- Piper stuebelii Trel.
- Piper subaduncum Yunck.
- Piper subaequilaterum Trel.
- Piper subalbicans C.DC.
- Piper subalpinum Yunck.
- Piper subampollosum Callejas
- Piper subandinum C.DC.
- Piper subasperatum Trel.
- Piper subaspericaule C.DC.
- Piper subasperifolium Yunck.
- Piper subbullatum K.Schum. & Lauterb.
- Piper subcaniramum C.DC.
- Piper subcaudatum Trel.
- Piper subcinereum C.DC.
- Piper subconcinnum C.DC.
- Piper subcordatum (Miq.) C.DC.
- Piper subcordulatum Trel.
- Piper subcrenulatum C.DC.
- Piper subdilatatum Trel.
- Piper subdivaricatum Trel.
- Piper subduidaense Yunck.
- Piper subeburneum Trel. & Standl.
- Piper subepunctatum C.DC.
- Piper suberythrocarpum C.DC.
- Piper subexiguicaule Callejas
- Piper subfalcatum Yunck.
- Piper subflavicans Trel.
- Piper subflavispicum C.DC.
- Piper subflavum C.DC.
- Piper subfragile C.DC.
- Piper subfrutescens Trel. & Yunck.
- Piper subfuscum C.DC.
- Piper subgibbosum Callejas
- Piper subglabribracteatum C.DC.
- Piper subglabrifolium C.DC.
- Piper subglabrilimbum (Yunck.) Callejas
- Piper subglabrum C.DC.
- Piper subhirsutum Trel.
- Piper sublaevifolium Trel.
- Piper sublepidotum Yunck.
- Piper sublignosum Yunck.
- Piper sublineatum Kuntze
- Piper submolle Trel.
- Piper submultinerve C.DC.
- Piper subnitidifolium Yunck.
- Piper subnitidum C.DC.
- Piper subnudibracteum C.DC.
- Piper subnudispicum Trel.
- Piper subpatens Trel.
- Piper subpedale Trel. & Yunck.
- Piper subpenninerve Ridl.
- Piper subprostratum C.DC.
- Piper subpubibracteum C.DC.
- Piper subquadratum Trel.
- Piper subquinquenerve Trel.
- Piper subrepens Trel.
- Piper subrubrispicum C.DC.
- Piper subrugosum Yunck.
- Piper subscutatum C.DC.
- Piper subseptemnervium (Miq.) C.DC.
- Piper subsericeum Trel.
- Piper subsessilifolium C.DC.
- Piper subsessililimbum C.DC.
- Piper subsilvestre C.DC.
- Piper subsilvulanum C.DC.
- Piper substenocarpum C.DC.
- Piper substilosum Yunck.
- Piper subtomentosum Trel. & Yunck.
- Piper subtrinerve Trel.
- Piper subulatum C.DC.
- Piper subvariabile Trel.
- Piper subzhorquinense C.DC. ex Trel.
- Piper sucreanum G.A.Queiroz & E.F.Guim.
- Piper sucreense Trel. & Yunck.
- Piper suffrutescens C.DC.
- Piper suffruticosum Trel.
- Piper sugandhi Ravindran, K.N.Babu & V.G.Naik
- Piper suipigua Buch.-Ham. ex D.Don
- Piper sulcatum Blume
- Piper sulcinervosum Trel.
- Piper sumpi Trel.
- Piper sundaicum Blume
- Piper supernum Trel. & Yunck.
- Piper suratanum Trel. & Yunck.
- Piper surubresanum Trel.
- Piper svenningii W.Trujillo-C.
- Piper swartzianum (Miq.) C.DC.
- Piper sylvaticum Roxb.
- Piper sylvestre Lour.
- Piper syringifolium Vahl

== T ==
- Piper tabanicidum Trel.
- Piper tabernillanum Trel.
- Piper tabinense Trel.
- Piper taboganum C.DC.
- Piper tacanaense Callejas
- Piper tacananum Trel. & Standl.
- Piper tacarcunense Callejas
- Piper tacariguense Steyerm.
- Piper tachiranum Yunck.
- Piper tacticanum Trel. & Standl.
- Piper taiwanense T.T.Lin & S.Y.Lu
- Piper tajumulcoanum Trel. & Standl.
- Piper talbotii C.DC.
- Piper tamayoanum Steyerm.
- Piper tapantiense Trel.
- Piper taperanum Yunck.
- Piper taperinhanum Yunck.
- Piper tapianum Trel.
- Piper tarcolense Callejas
- Piper tardans Trel.
- Piper tarquiense W.Trujillo-C.
- Piper tectoniifolium (Kunth) Kunth ex Steud.
- Piper tecumense Trel.
- Piper tecutlanum Trel. & Standl.
- Piper telanum Trel.
- Piper telembi E.García
- Piper temiscoense Trel. ex Callejas
- Piper temptum Trel.
- Piper tenebricosum Trel.
- Piper tentatum Trel.
- Piper tenue Kunth
- Piper tenuibracteum C.DC.
- Piper tenuiculispicum Trel.
- Piper tenuicuspe (Miq.) C.DC.
- Piper tenuifolium C.DC.
- Piper tenuilimbum C.DC.
- Piper tenuimucronatum C.DC.
- Piper tenuinerve C.DC.
- Piper tenuipes C.DC.
- Piper tenuispicum C.DC.
- Piper tepicanum C.DC.
- Piper tepuiense Steyerm.
- Piper tequendanense C.DC.
- Piper terrabanum C.DC.
- Piper terryae Standl.
- Piper tesserispicum Trel.
- Piper tessmannii Trel.
- Piper teysmannii (Miq.) C.DC.
- Piper theobromifolium O.Schwartz
- Piper thermale Vahl
- Piper thomsonii (C.DC.) Hook.f.
- Piper thorelii C.DC.
- Piper tiguanum C.DC.
- Piper tilaranum Trel.
- Piper timbiquinum C.DC.
- Piper timbuchianum Trel.
- Piper tinctum Trel.
- Piper tjambae C.DC.
- Piper tocacheanum C.DC.
- Piper tomas-albertoi Trel. & Yunck.
- Piper tomentosum Mill.
- Piper tomohonum C.DC.
- Piper tonduzii C.DC.
- Piper toppingii C.DC.
- Piper toronotepuiense Steyerm.
- Piper torresanum Trel.
- Piper torricellense Lauterb.
- Piper tortivenulosum Yunck.
- Piper tortuosipilum Trel.
- Piper tortuosivenosum Trel.
- Piper tovarense Trel. & Yunck.
- Piper townsendii C.DC.
- Piper trachydermum Trel.
- Piper trachyphyllum C.DC.
- Piper translucens Yunck.
- Piper transpontinum Trel.
- Piper travancorianum P.K.Mukh.
- Piper trianae C.DC.
- Piper triangulare Chew ex P.Royen
- Piper trichocarpon C.DC.
- Piper trichogynum C.DC.
- Piper trichoneuron (Miq.) C.DC.
- Piper trichophlebium Trel.
- Piper trichophyllum C.DC.
- Piper trichopus Trel.
- Piper trichorhachis C.DC.
- Piper trichostachyon (Miq.) C.DC.
- Piper trichostylopse Trel.
- Piper trichostylum C.DC.
- Piper tricolor Y.C.Tseng
- Piper tricuspe (Miq.) C.DC.
- Piper tridentipilum C.DC.
- Piper trigoniastrifolium C.DC.
- Piper trigonocarpum Trel.
- Piper trigonodrupum Yunck.
- Piper trigonum C.DC.
- Piper trinervium (Miq.) C.DC.
- Piper trineuron Miq.
- Piper triquetrofructum Trel.
- Piper tristemon C.DC.
- Piper tristigmum Trel.
- Piper truman-yunckeri Callejas
- Piper truncatibaccum C.DC.
- Piper tsakianum C.DC.
- Piper tsangyuanense P.S.Chen & P.C.Zhu
- Piper tsarasotrae Papini, Palchetti, M.Gori & Rota Nodari
- Piper tsengianum M.G.Gilbert & N.H.Xia
- Piper tsuritkubense Trel.
- Piper tuberculatum Jacq.
- Piper tucumanum C.DC.
- Piper tuerckheimii C.DC.
- Piper tuisanum C.DC.
- Piper tumidinodum Yunck.
- Piper tumidipedunculum Trel.
- Piper tumidonodosum P.K.Mukh.
- Piper tumidum Kunth
- Piper tumupasense Yunck.
- Piper tungurahuae Sodiro
- Piper tuquesanum Callejas
- Piper turbense Trel.
- Piper turrialvanum C.DC.
- Piper tuxtepecense Trel. ex Callejas
- Piper tuxtlense Callejas

== U ==
- Piper uaupesense Yunck.
- Piper ubiqueasperum Trel.
- Piper ubiquescabridum Trel.
- Piper ucayalianum Trel.
- Piper udicola C.DC.
- Piper udimontanum C.DC.
- Piper uhdei C.DC.
- Piper ulceratum Trel.
- Piper uleanum Trel.
- Piper ulei C.DC.
- Piper ulvifolium K.Schum. & Lauterb.
- Piper umbellatum L.
- Piper umbricola C.DC.
- Piper umbriculum (Cuatrec.) M.A.Jaram. & Callejas
- Piper umbriense Trel. & Yunck.
- Piper umbrosum Kunth
- Piper uncinulatum Ridl.
- Piper ungaramense C.DC.
- Piper unguiculatum Ruiz & Pav.
- Piper unguiculiferum Trel.
- Piper unillanum Trel. & Yunck.
- Piper upalaense Callejas
- Piper urdanetanum C.DC.
- Piper urense Callejas
- Piper urophyllum C.DC.
- Piper urostachyum Hemsl.
- Piper urubambanum Trel.
- Piper uspantanense C.DC.
- Piper usumacintense Lundell
- Piper utinganum Yunck.
- Piper uvitanum C.DC.

== V ==
- Piper vaccinum Standl. & Steyerm.
- Piper vaginans C.DC.
- Piper valdivianum Callejas
- Piper valetudinarii Trel.
- Piper valladolidense Yunck.
- Piper vallicola C.DC.
- Piper vanderveldeanum Trel.
- Piper varablancanum Trel.
- Piper varibracteum C.DC.
- Piper variifolium (Miq.) C.DC.
- Piper variipilum C.DC.
- Piper variitrichum Yunck.
- Piper velae W.Trujillo-C. & M.A.Jaram.
- Piper velayudhanii E.S.S.Kumar & S.P.Mathew
- Piper vellosoi Yunck.
- Piper velutinervium C.DC.
- Piper velutinibaccum C.DC.
- Piper velutininervosum Trel.
- Piper velutinobracteosum Callejas
- Piper velutinovarium C.DC.
- Piper velutinum Kunth
- Piper venamoense Steyerm.
- Piper veneralense Trel. & Yunck.
- Piper venosum (Miq.) C.DC.
- Piper ventoleranum Trel.
- Piper venulosissimum Yunck.
- Piper veraguanum Callejas
- Piper veraguense C.DC.
- Piper verbascifolium (Miq.) C.DC.
- Piper verbenanum C.DC.
- Piper veredianum Trel.
- Piper vergelense Trel. & Standl.
- Piper vermiculatum C.DC.
- Piper verruculicaule Trel.
- Piper verruculifolium Trel.
- Piper verruculigerum Trel.
- Piper verruculipetiolum Trel.
- Piper verruculosum C.DC.
- Piper versteegii C.DC.
- Piper vestitifolium C.DC.
- Piper vestitum C.DC.
- Piper vexans Trel.
- Piper via-chicoense Yunck.
- Piper viae-marginis Trel.
- Piper vicinum Trel.
- Piper vicosanum Yunck.
- Piper victorianum C.DC.
- Piper villalobosense Yunck.
- Piper villarrealii Yunck.
- Piper villipedunculum C.DC.
- Piper villirameum C.DC.
- Piper villiramulum C.DC.
- Piper villistipulum Trel.
- Piper villosispicum Trel.
- Piper villosissimum Yunck.
- Piper villosum C.DC.
- Piper viminifolium Trel.
- Piper virgatum Yunck.
- Piper virgenense Trel. & Yunck.
- Piper virginicum Trel. & Standl.
- Piper virgultorum C.DC.
- Piper viridescens Suwanph. & Chantar.
- Piper viridicaule Trel.
- Piper viridifolium Trel.
- Piper viridilimbum Trel.
- Piper viridistachyum Yunck.
- Piper virillanum C.DC.
- Piper viscaianum Trel. & Yunck.
- Piper vitabile Trel.
- Piper vitaceum Yunck.
- Piper viticaule Yunck.
- Piper vitiense A.C.Sm.
- Piper voigtii C.DC.
- Piper volubile C.DC.

== W ==
- Piper wabagense W.L.Chew
- Piper wachenheimii Trel.
- Piper wagneri C.DC.
- Piper walkeri Miq.
- Piper wallichii (Miq.) Hand.-Mazz.
- Piper wangii M.G.Gilbert & N.H.Xia
- Piper weddellii C.DC.
- Piper wedelii Yunck.
- Piper wibomii Yunck.
- Piper wichmannii C.DC.
- Piper wightii Miq.
- Piper wilhelmense Chew ex P.Royen
- Piper wilsonii Trel.
- Piper wingfieldii Steyerm.
- Piper winkleri C.DC.
- Piper woytkowskii Yunck.
- Piper wrightii C.DC.

== X ==
- Piper xanthocarpum C.DC.
- Piper xanthoneurum Trel.
- Piper xanthostachyum C.DC.
- Piper xiroresanum C.DC.
- Piper xylosteoides (Kunth) Steud.

== Y ==
- Piper yamaranguilaense Callejas
- Piper yanaconasense Trel. & Yunck.
- Piper yananoanum Trel.
- Piper yaracuyense Yunck.
- Piper yaxhanum Trel.
- Piper yessupianum Trel.
- Piper yinkiangense Y.C.Tseng
- Piper yoroanum Trel.
- Piper yousei Trel.
- Piper yucatanense C.DC.
- Piper yui M.G.Gilbert & N.H.Xia
- Piper yungasanum Yunck.
- Piper yunnanense Y.C.Tseng
- Piper yzabalanum C.DC.

== Z ==
- Piper zacapanum Trel. & Standl.
- Piper zacatense C.DC.
- Piper zarceroense Trel.
- Piper zarumanum Trel.
- Piper zentanum C.DC.
- Piper zeylanicum Miq.
- Piper zhorquinense C.DC.
- Piper zollingeri C.DC.
- Piper zonulatispicum Trel.
