= Piper generalense =

Scientific classification
- Kingdom: Plantae
- Clade: Tracheophytes
- Clade: Angiosperms
- Clade: Magnoliids
- Order: Piperales
- Family: Piperaceae
- Genus: Piper
- Species: P. generalense

Binomial name
- Piper generalense Trel.

Species of flowering plant

Piper generalense is a species of plant in the family Piperaceae. It is native to Costa Rica.
