= Piper sylvaticum =

Scientific classification
- Kingdom: Plantae
- Clade: Tracheophytes
- Clade: Angiosperms
- Clade: Magnoliids
- Order: Piperales
- Family: Piperaceae
- Genus: Piper
- Species: P. sylvaticum

Binomial name
- Piper sylvaticum Roxb.

Synonyms
- Chavica sylvatica (Roxb.) Miq.

Species of flowering plant

Piper sylvaticum is a climber in the Piperaceae, or pepper, family. It is found in the northeast of the Indian subcontinent, and in China. The fruits are used in medicinal products.

== Description ==
A herbaceous, dioecious climber that possesses stolons. The stems are finely powdery pubescent when young, and become ridged and furrowed when mature. It has globose drupes about 3mm in diameter. Flowers in August and September in China, in the Manas National Park of northwest Assam, flowering and fruiting occur from August to October, while in Bangladesh flowers and fruits appear from May to September. This species is distinguished anatomically by having very finely (magnification needed) powdered pubescent leaves. Other distinctive features, differentiating the species from other Piper species in Bangladesh, is yellow flowers and deeply cordate and lobed leaf bases at a macroscopic level, while bicollateral leaf vascular bundles, and para- and tetracytic stomata were identified as distinctive at microscopic anatomical level.

== Taxonomy ==
The species was first described by William Roxburgh in 1820.

== Distribution ==
The plant is native to Bangladesh and the Eastern Himalaya region. The Flora of China warns that the application of this name to Chinese plants is unclear, however it states that the climber is found in Tibet (see also) and South Yunnan, as well as Bangladesh, India and Myanmar.

== Habitat and ecology ==
The vine grows in wet places within forests up to 800m in China. It occurs in sub-Himalayan semi-evergreen forest in the Manas National Park of northwestern Assam. Shaded areas of the forest bed is a preferred habitat in Bangladesh.

== Vernacular names ==
Amongst the Monpa people of Mêdog County in southeastern Tibet the plant is referred to as pang-ser. In Standard Chinese, the plant is given the name 长柄胡椒, chang bing hu jiao. An English language vernacular name is mountain long pepper. Pahari pipul (Hindi), pahaari peepal (folk medicine), Pahari-pipoli (Assamese), and vana-pippali (Ayurveda) are some of the names in India. In Bangladesh the vine is referred to as pahari pipul or bon pan (Bengali), borongpatui (Tipuri languages), or bulpan.

== Uses ==
In the Indian subcontinent the leaves are used as vegetables, and the roots are used in indigenous medicine as a cure for snake poison and to treat tumours.

The mashed leaves are used as an anti-inflammatory by the Monpa people of Mêdog County in southeastern Tibet.

Adnan et al.'s work on the bioactivity of the species cites wide traditional medicine uses in the native countries of the plant. The leaves, stems, roots, fruits, and seeds are used to treat a variety of diseases, including rheumatic pain, headaches, chronic cough, cold, asthma, piles, diarrhea, wounds in lungs, tuberculosis, indigestion, dyspepsia, hepatomegaly, and pleenomegaly. The root is specifically used as a carminative, while the aerial parts have diuretic actions. Adnan et al. found that P. sylvaticum is bioactive.
