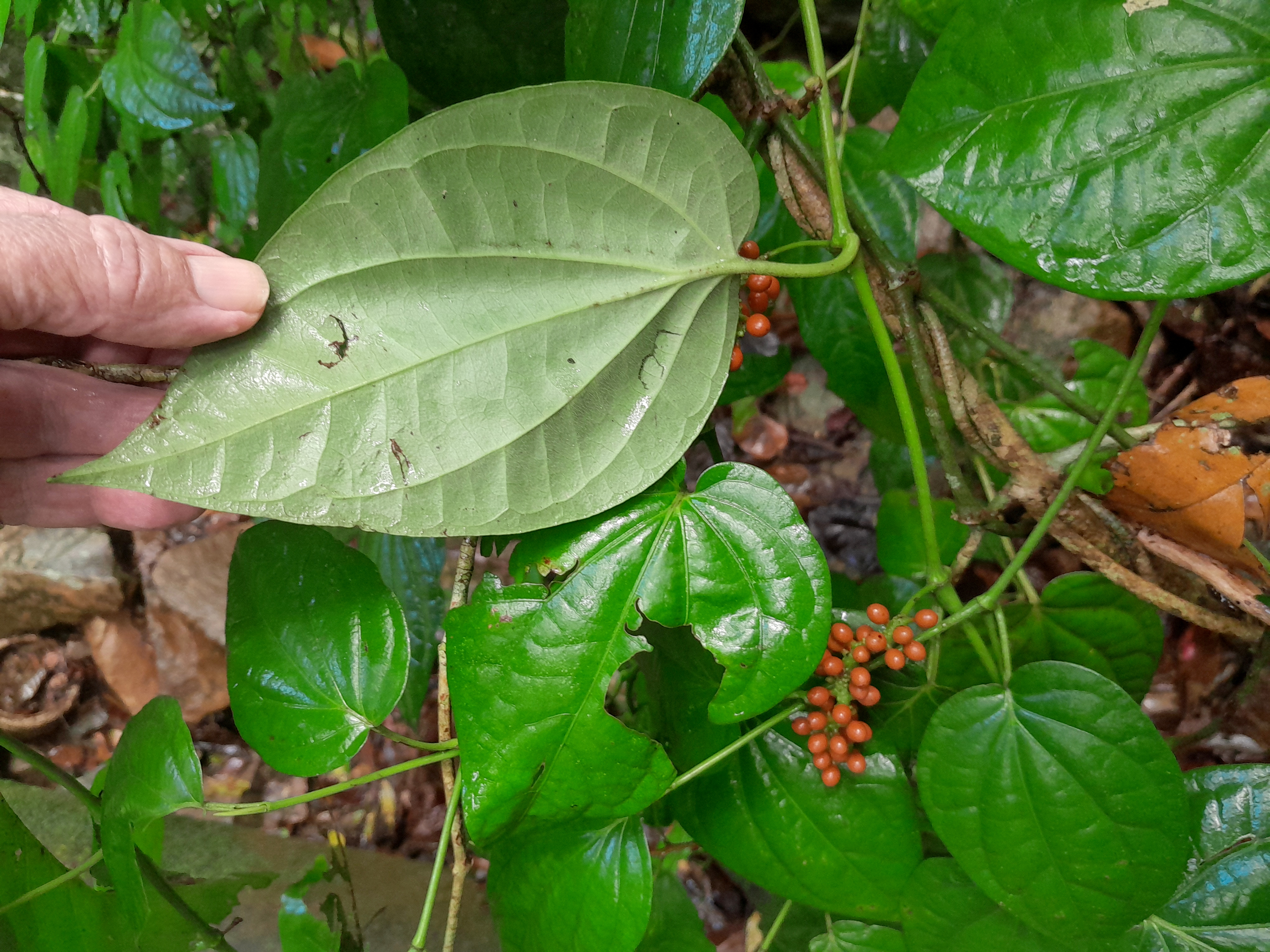
- Foliage and fruit

Conservation status
- Least Concern (NCA)

Scientific classification
- Kingdom: Plantae
- Clade: Tracheophytes
- Clade: Angiosperms
- Clade: Magnoliids
- Order: Piperales
- Family: Piperaceae
- Genus: Piper
- Species: P. lanatum

Binomial name
- Piper lanatum Roxb.

Synonyms
- 47 synonyms: Chavica haenkeana (Opiz) C.Presl; Chavica viminalis (Opiz) Miq.; Cubeba canina (Blume) Miq.; Cubeba lowong (Blume) Miq.; Peperomia lanata A.Dietr.; Piper acutibaccum C.DC.; Piper apoanum C.DC.; Piper arborescens Thwaites; Piper arborisedens C.DC.; Piper banksii Miq.; Piper basilanum C.DC.; Piper boerlagei C.DC.; Piper bombycatum Noronha; Piper bonthainense C.DC.; Piper cabadbaranum C.DC.; Piper caninum Blume; Piper caninum var. latibracteum C.DC.; Piper caninum var. thwaitesii (C.DC.) Hook.f.; Piper dagatpanum C.DC.; Piper densibaccum C.DC.; Piper gelalae C.DC.; Piper haenkeanum Opiz; Piper hallieri C.DC.; Piper hirsutissimum D.Dietr.; Piper javanicum C.DC.; Piper kietanum C.DC.; Piper lowong Blume; Piper malalaganum C.DC.; Piper marivelesanum C.DC.; Piper merrittii C.DC.; Piper merrittii var. parvifolium C.DC.; Piper negrosense C.DC.; Piper obovatibracteum C.DC.; Piper parcipilum C.DC.; Piper pedunculatum Reinw. ex Miq.; Piper perpunctatum C.DC.; Piper pilobracteatum Chaveer. & Sudmoon; Piper sablanum Quisumb.; Piper tenuipedunculum C.DC.; Piper tenuirameum C.DC.; Piper thwaitesii C.DC.; Piper villilimbum C.DC.; Piper viminale Opiz

= Piper lanatum =

Peppervine

Species of flowering plant

Piper lanatum, commonly known in Australia as peppervine, is a species of plants in the pepper family Piperaceae found from India through Southeast Asia to Queensland, Australia.

== Description ==
It is a perennial root climber with a stem diameter up to 2 cm (0.79 in). The leaves may be broadly or narrowly ovate to elliptic and can reach 18 cm (7.1 in) in length and 12 cm (4.7 in) in width. The inflorescence is a spike produced on the stem opposite a leaf; male spikes are up to 7 cm (2.8 in) long, female spikes to 18 cm (7.1 in). Flowers are minute, less than 1 mm (0.04 in) diameter. The fruit is, in botanical terminology, a berry about 6 mm (0.24 in) diameter containing a single seed.

== Taxonomy ==
Piper lanatum was first described by botanist William Roxburgh in 1820.

In Australia, this species is known by the name Piper caninum – it is recognised by all relevant authorities, i.e. the Council of Heads of Australasian Herbaria, the Queensland Herbarium, and the publications Flora of Australia and Australian Tropical Rainforest Plants. The name is considered a synonym of P. lanatum by Plants of the World Online.

== Conservation ==
This species is listed as least concern under the Queensland Government's Nature Conservation Act. As of 10 January 2025, it has not been assessed by the International Union for Conservation of Nature (IUCN).
