= Piper abajoense =

Scientific classification
- Kingdom: Plantae
- Clade: Embryophytes
- Clade: Tracheophytes
- Clade: Angiosperms
- Clade: Magnoliids
- Order: Piperales
- Family: Piperaceae
- Genus: Piper
- Species: P. abajoense

Binomial name
- Piper abajoense Bornst.

Species of plant

Piper abajoense is a species of plant in the genus Piper. It was discovered by Allan Jay Bornstein in 2014. The species can only be found in Puerto Rico. In the Municipality of Utuado, Piper abajoense has an elevation of 315 meters.
