= Piper cutucuense =

Conservation status
- Endangered (IUCN 3.1)

Scientific classification
- Kingdom: Plantae
- Clade: Tracheophytes
- Clade: Angiosperms
- Clade: Magnoliids
- Order: Piperales
- Family: Piperaceae
- Genus: Piper
- Species: P. cutucuense

Binomial name
- Piper cutucuense Yunck.

Species of shrub

Piper cutucuense is a species of plant in the family Piperaceae. It is endemic to Ecuador. It is a shrub in the Andes foothills of southeastern Ecuador, at about 1,260 meters elevation.

In 2004, it was assessed to be endangered, not due to any specific threat targeting it, but due to threat of habitat loss. It was noted that it was not then in Ecuadorean museums, nor was it known to be growing in any of Ecuador's protected areas. In fact it is only known scientifically from a 1944 collection in one area.
