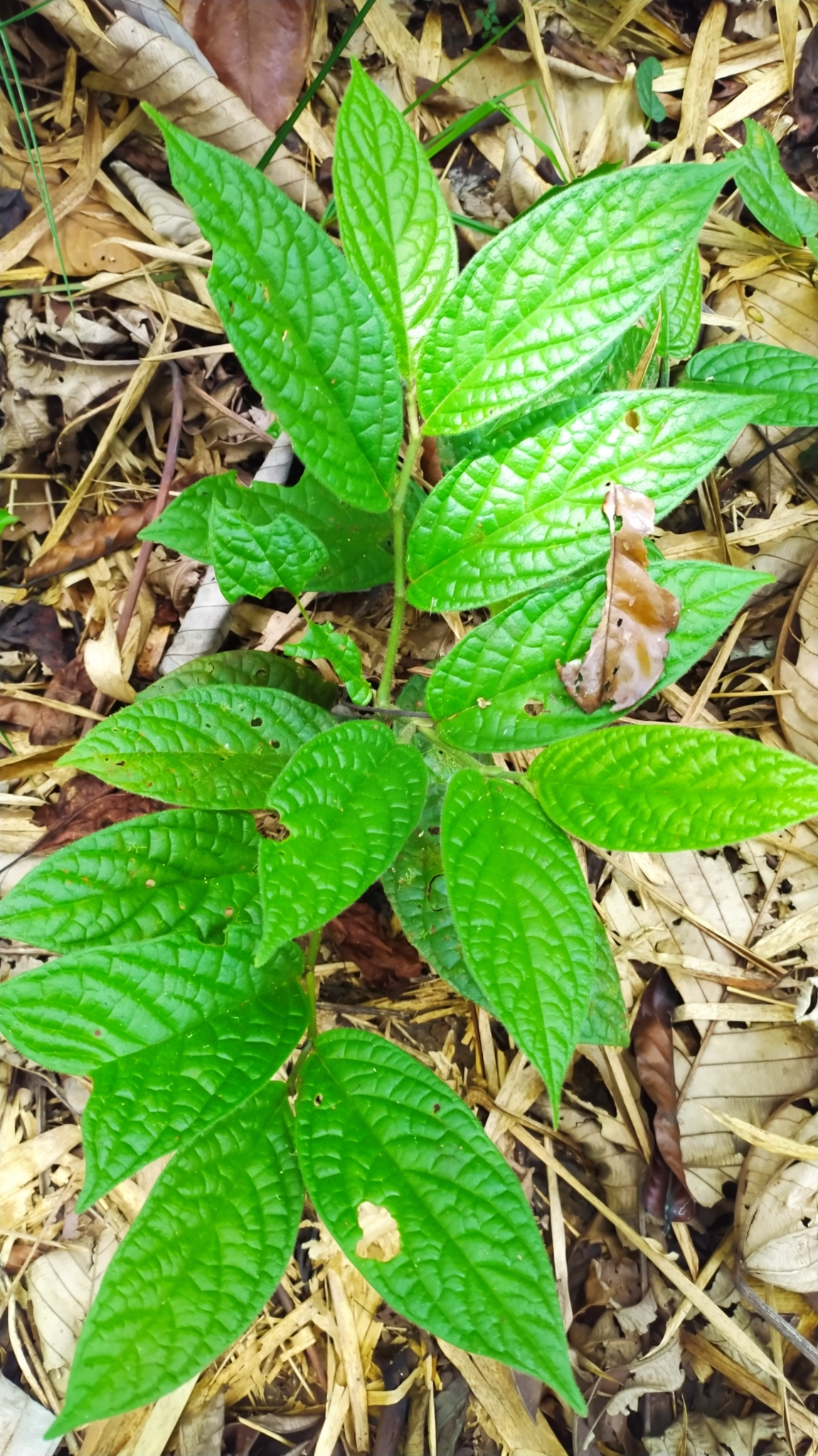

Scientific classification
- Kingdom: Plantae
- Clade: Tracheophytes
- Clade: Angiosperms
- Clade: Magnoliids
- Order: Piperales
- Family: Piperaceae
- Genus: Piper
- Species: P. brownsbergense

Binomial name
- Piper brownsbergense Yunck.

= Piper brownsbergense =

Species of plant

Piper brownsbergense is a species from the genus Piper. It was originally described by Truman G. Yuncker.

== Description ==
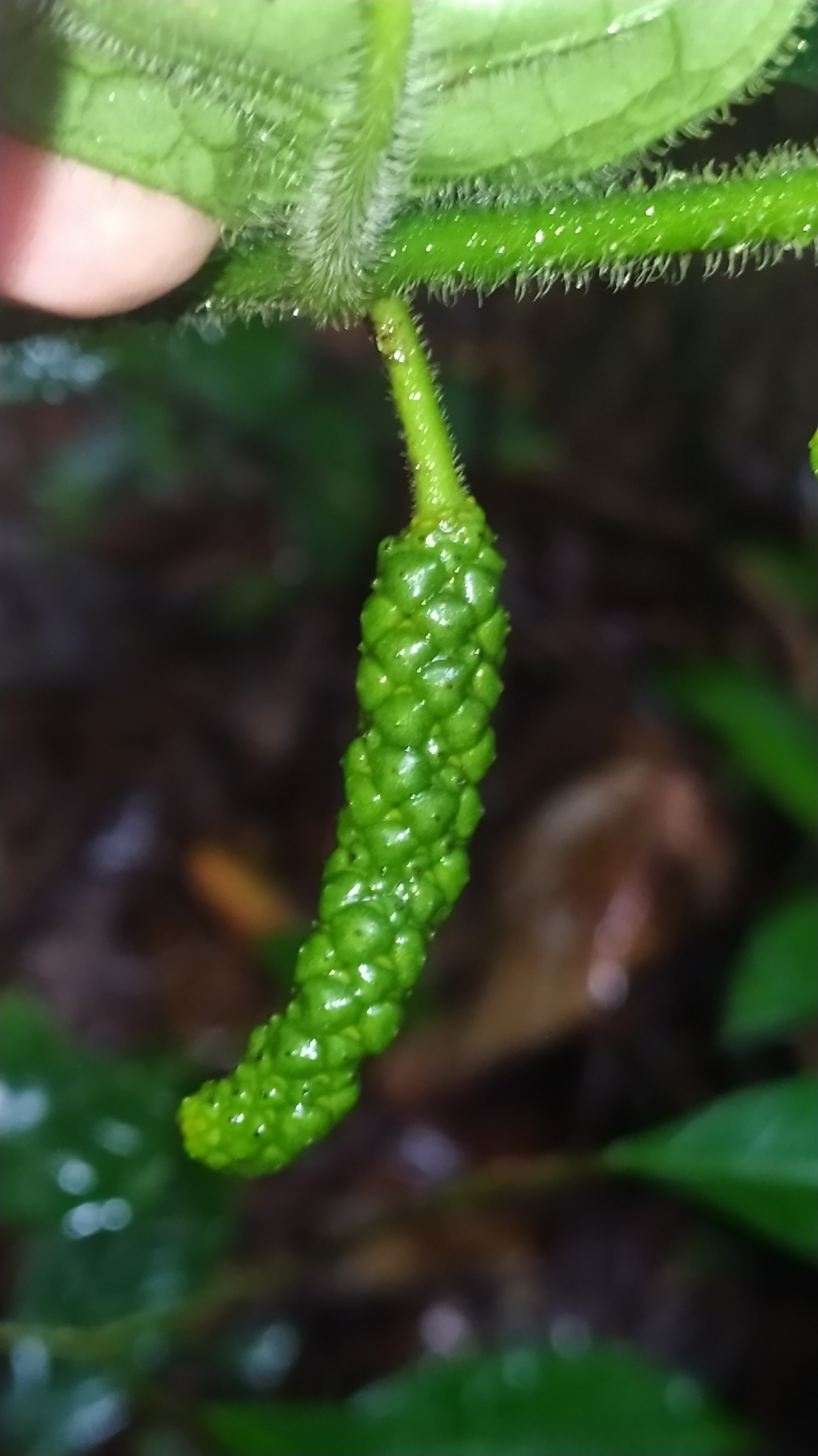

This is a small plant that grows up to 1.5 meters tall. It has a stem that is somewhat yellow and covered in hairs. The leaves are oval or lance-shaped, with rough surfaces and small dots on them. The edges of the leaves have small hairs and the tips are sharp or pointed. The plant produces flowers that hang down below the leaves, and the fruits are round or oval in shape.

== Range ==
Piper brownsbergense is found in The Guianas, which are French Guiana, Guyana and Suriname.

== Etymology ==
Piper brownsbergense is named after Brownsberg, a mountain range in Suriname
