= Piper hylebates =

Conservation status
- Vulnerable (IUCN 3.1)

Scientific classification
- Kingdom: Plantae
- Clade: Tracheophytes
- Clade: Angiosperms
- Clade: Magnoliids
- Order: Piperales
- Family: Piperaceae
- Genus: Piper
- Species: P. hylebates

Binomial name
- Piper hylebates C. DC.

Species of flowering plant

Piper hylebates is a species of plant in the family Piperaceae. It is endemic to Ecuador.
