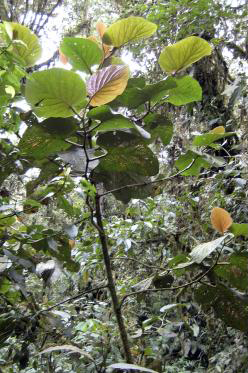

Scientific classification
- Kingdom: Plantae
- Clade: Tracheophytes
- Clade: Angiosperms
- Clade: Magnoliids
- Order: Piperales
- Family: Piperaceae
- Genus: Piper
- Species: P. kelleyi

Binomial name
- Piper kelleyi Tepe et al. (2014)

= Piper kelleyi =

Species of plant

Piper kelleyi is a wild relative of black pepper that grows in Ecuador and Peru. The species is named in honor of American botanist Walter Almond Kelley and is a member of the Macrostachys clade of the pepper genus. Piper kelleyi features long, white, pendulous inflorescences and large leaves. It is mostly restricted to montane elevations and produces secondary compounds that deter most herbivores. The most important secondary compounds discovered from P. kelleyi are a prenylated benzoic acid and 2 chromates that are unique to this species.

Piper kelleyi was scientifically described on February 7, 2014, in the journal PhytoKeys. The pinkish undersides of the leaves gave this species the nickname "pink belly" in the research team. Several insect species are entirely dependent on Piper kelleyi for survival, including many specialized caterpillars in the genus Eois (Geometridae).
