= Piper abalienatum =

Scientific classification
- Kingdom: Plantae
- Clade: Tracheophytes
- Clade: Angiosperms
- Clade: Magnoliids
- Order: Piperales
- Family: Piperaceae
- Genus: Piper
- Species: P. abalienatum

Binomial name
- Piper abalienatum Trel.

Synonyms
- Piper el-muletonum C.DC.; Piper el-muletonum C.DC. ex Schröd.

Species of plant

Piper abalienatum is a species of plant in the genus Piper. It was discovered by William Trelease in 1921. It only occurs in Mexico (Jalisco and Michoacán).
