= Piper melchior =

- Foliage and immature infructescences

Conservation status
- Naturally Uncommon (NZ TCS)

Scientific classification
- Kingdom: Plantae
- Clade: Tracheophytes
- Clade: Angiosperms
- Clade: Magnoliids
- Order: Piperales
- Family: Piperaceae
- Genus: Piper
- Species: P. melchior

Binomial name
- Piper melchior (Sykes) M.A.Jaram.

Synonyms
- Macropiper melchior Skyes

Species of flowering plant

Piper melchior, commonly known as the Three Kings kawakawa, is a species of shrub in the family Piperaceae. A dense shrub with dish-shaped leaves, P. melchior is endemic to the Three Kings Islands, where it is found mostly in the shady parts of coastal forests. Its 2023 conservation status in the New Zealand Threat Classification System was "At Risk – Naturally Uncommon".

== Taxonomy ==
Piper melchior was first described by William Russell Sykes in 1992. The species was moved from the genus Macropiper to the genus Piper in 2008. The specific epithet, melchior, refers to Melchior of the Biblical Magi.

== Description ==
Piper melchior is a dense bushy shrub that can grow up to 2 metres (6 feet 7 inches) tall. It has glossy, green dish-shaped leaves which are usually measuring 7 cm–13 cm × 7 cm–11 cm (2.8 in–5.1 in × 2.8 in–4.3 in). It has long inflorescences (flower clusters), and its infructescences (fruit clusters) turn orange when ripe.
