= Piper peltatum =

Scientific classification
- Kingdom: Plantae
- Clade: Tracheophytes
- Clade: Angiosperms
- Clade: Magnoliids
- Order: Piperales
- Family: Piperaceae
- Genus: Piper
- Species: P. peltatum

Binomial name
- Piper peltatum L.

Species of plant

Piper peltatum, also known as Pothomorphe peltatum, is a shrub of the drier Neotropics in the black pepper family Piperaceae. It grows to 2 m (6 ft 7 in) in height and has peltate leaves 18 cm (7.1 in) long and about 15 cm (5.9 in) wide. The inflorescences are vertical white spikes with multitudes of tiny flowers.

The range of the plant extends from Mexico in the north to Brazil to the south.
