= Piper sodiroi =

Conservation status
- Vulnerable (IUCN 3.1)

Scientific classification
- Kingdom: Plantae
- Clade: Tracheophytes
- Clade: Angiosperms
- Clade: Magnoliids
- Order: Piperales
- Family: Piperaceae
- Genus: Piper
- Species: P. sodiroi

Binomial name
- Piper sodiroi C. DC.

Synonyms
- Piper sodiroi var. fuscum Sodiro in Anales Univ. Centr. Ecuador 13: 676 (1898); Piper sodiroi var. incanum Sodiro in Anales Univ. Centr. Ecuador 13: 676 (1898)

Species of flowering plant

Piper sodiroi is a species of plant in the family Piperaceae. It is endemic to Ecuador.

The specific epithet of sodiroi refers to Luis Sodiro (1836–1909), who was an Italian Jesuit priest and a field botanist, who collected many plants in Ecuador.

It was first published by Swiss botanist Casimir de Candolle in Bull. Herb. Boissier vol.6 on page 482 in 1898.
