= Piper distigmatum =

Conservation status
- Data Deficient (IUCN 2.3)

Scientific classification
- Kingdom: Plantae
- Clade: Tracheophytes
- Clade: Angiosperms
- Clade: Magnoliids
- Order: Piperales
- Family: Piperaceae
- Genus: Piper
- Species: P. distigmatum

Binomial name
- Piper distigmatum Yuncker

Species of flowering plant

Piper distigmatum is a species of plant in the family Piperaceae. It is endemic to Panama.
