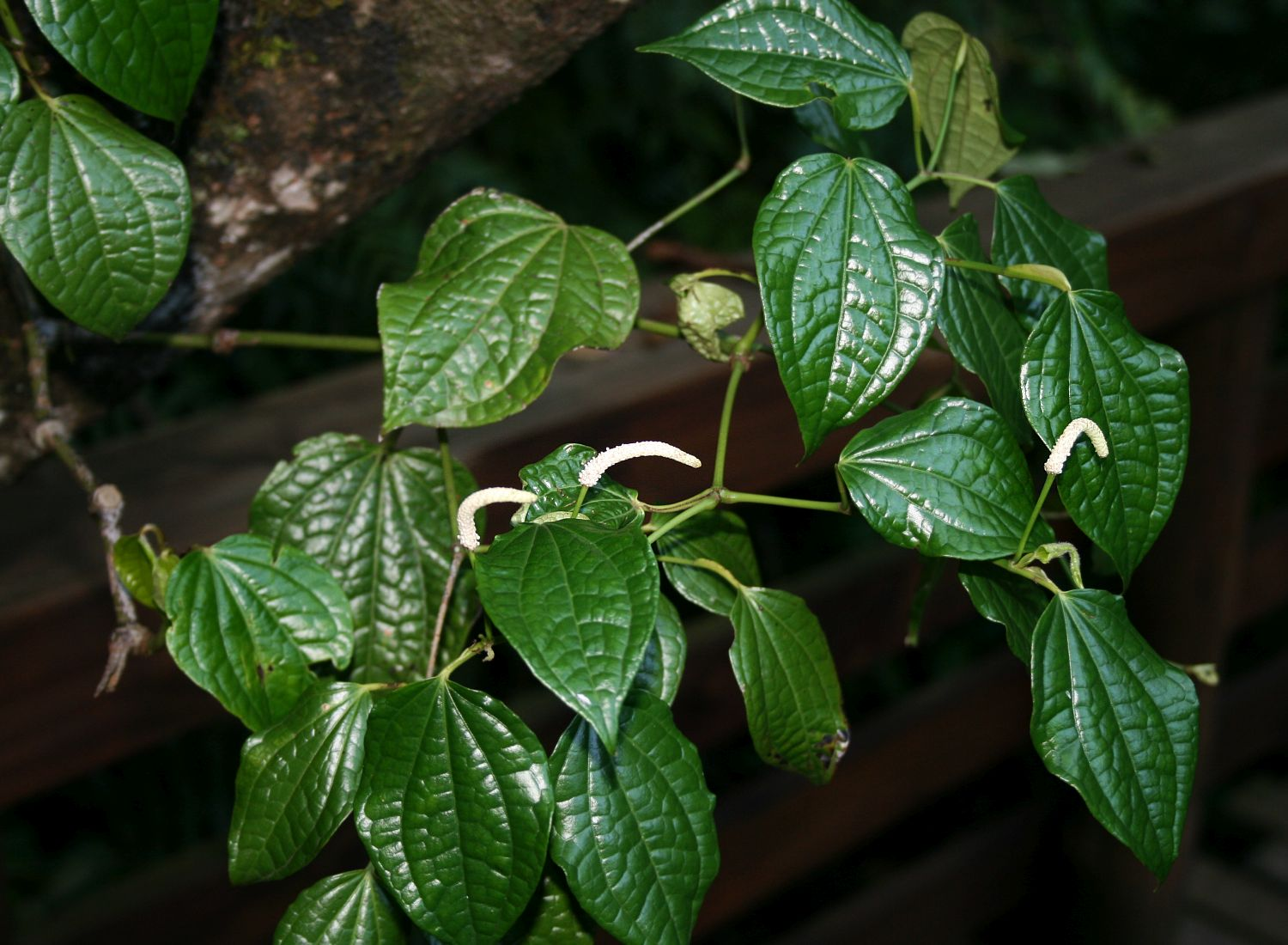
- Piper capense

Scientific classification
- Kingdom: Plantae
- Clade: Tracheophytes
- Clade: Angiosperms
- Clade: Magnoliids
- Order: Piperales
- Family: Piperaceae
- Genus: Piper
- Species: P. capense

Binomial name
- Piper capense L.f.

= Piper capense =

African long pepper

Species of pepper plant

Piper capense is a species of pepper in the genus Piper. A relative of black pepper (Piper nigrum), its berries are used as a spice called African long pepper, Ethiopian long pepper, or timiz.
