= Piper bullatifolium =

Conservation status
- Critically Endangered (IUCN 3.1)

Scientific classification
- Kingdom: Plantae
- Clade: Tracheophytes
- Clade: Angiosperms
- Clade: Magnoliids
- Order: Piperales
- Family: Piperaceae
- Genus: Piper
- Species: P. bullatifolium

Binomial name
- Piper bullatifolium Sodiro

Species of flowering plant

Piper bullatifolium is a species of a pepper plant in the family Piperaceae. It is endemic to Ecuador.
