= Piper laevigatum =

Conservation status
- Least Concern (IUCN 2.3)

Scientific classification
- Kingdom: Plantae
- Clade: Tracheophytes
- Clade: Angiosperms
- Clade: Magnoliids
- Order: Piperales
- Family: Piperaceae
- Genus: Piper
- Species: P. laevigatum

Binomial name
- Piper laevigatum Kunth

Species of flowering plant

Piper laevigatum is a species of plant in the family Piperaceae. It is found in Colombia, Panama, and Peru.
