= Piper pingbienense =

Scientific classification
- Kingdom: Plantae
- Clade: Tracheophytes
- Clade: Angiosperms
- Clade: Magnoliids
- Order: Piperales
- Family: Piperaceae
- Genus: Piper
- Species: P. pingbienense

Binomial name
- Piper pingbienense Y.C.Tseng

Species of plant

Piper pingbienense is a species of plant from the genus Piper. It was discovered in South-Central china by Yunnan Sheng in 1979.
