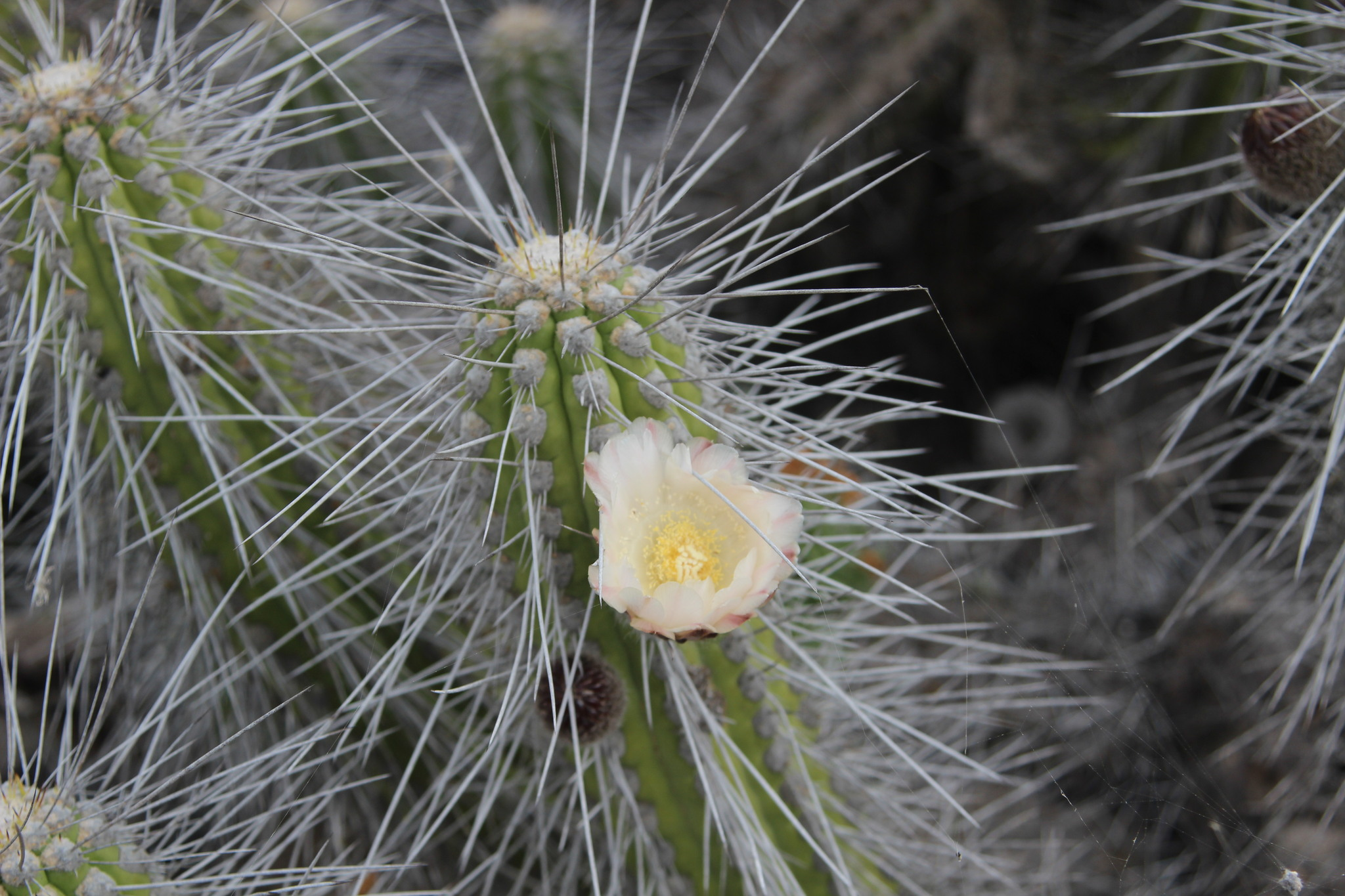

Scientific classification
- Kingdom: Plantae
- Clade: Tracheophytes
- Clade: Angiosperms
- Clade: Eudicots
- Order: Caryophyllales
- Family: Cactaceae
- Subfamily: Cactoideae
- Genus: Eulychnia
- Species: E. chorosensis

Binomial name
- Eulychnia chorosensis P.Klaassen 2011

Synonyms
- Eulychnia acida var. procumbens F.Ritter 1980; Philippicereus chorosensis (P.Klaassen) Guiggi 2020

= Eulychnia chorosensis =

Species of cactus

Eulychnia chorosensis is a species of Eulychnia found in Chile.

== Description ==
Eulychnia chorosensis is a shrubby cactus that grows in a prostrate clump, reaching up to 3 meters in width but no more than 1 meter in height, with upward-pointing stem tips. Its grayish-green stems can grow up to 2 meters long and are 5 to 8 cm in diameter. The stems feature 8 to 13 rounded ribs, approximately 1.5 cm wide and 5 to 8 mm deep, sometimes with a shallow groove above the areoles. These large, rounded areoles, about 1 cm in diameter and spaced 7 to 10 mm apart, are covered in light gray or white felt. The spination includes 1 to 3 central spines that are very long, straight, and forward-pointing, measuring 4 to 15 cm. It also has up to 12 radial spines, which are short, unequal in length, and range from 1 to 3 cm, though sometimes few or none are present.

Fragrance-free, diurnal flowers, measuring 6.5 to 7 cm long and 4 to 6 cm wide, appear along the upper stem, not just at the apex. The floral tube is notably thick and green, composed of large, mucilage-filled cells, with numerous green scales partially obscured by dense, dark brown wool, and its inner part around the ovary is white. The white petals, sometimes with a faint pink central stripe, are 1.5 to 2 cm long and 8 to 14 mm wide, with rounded tips. The thick, white style is about 2 cm long and bears 15 to 20 yellowish stigmatic lobes, while the numerous white stamens, with pale yellow anthers, completely fill the open flower.

The globose fruit, approximately 5 cm in diameter, transitions from green to brownish-green upon ripening and retains its scales and dark brown wool. Inside, the fruit has a thick wall with large, colorless mucilage-filled cells, surrounding a white, translucent, acidic pulp containing numerous seeds. These seeds are brownish-black with a matte surface, measuring about 2 mm long, 1.2 mm wide, and 0.5 mm thick.

Eulychnia chorosensis is closely related to Eulychnia acida, sharing features like large, felt-covered white areoles, robust spination, and flower placement on the stem. However, Eulychnia chorosensis is distinguished by its consistently dense, dark brown wool covering the floral tube, a characteristic not typically found in Eulychnia acida, and generally by its overall smaller individual size. Seedlings of both species are morphologically similar and difficult to distinguish in their early stages.

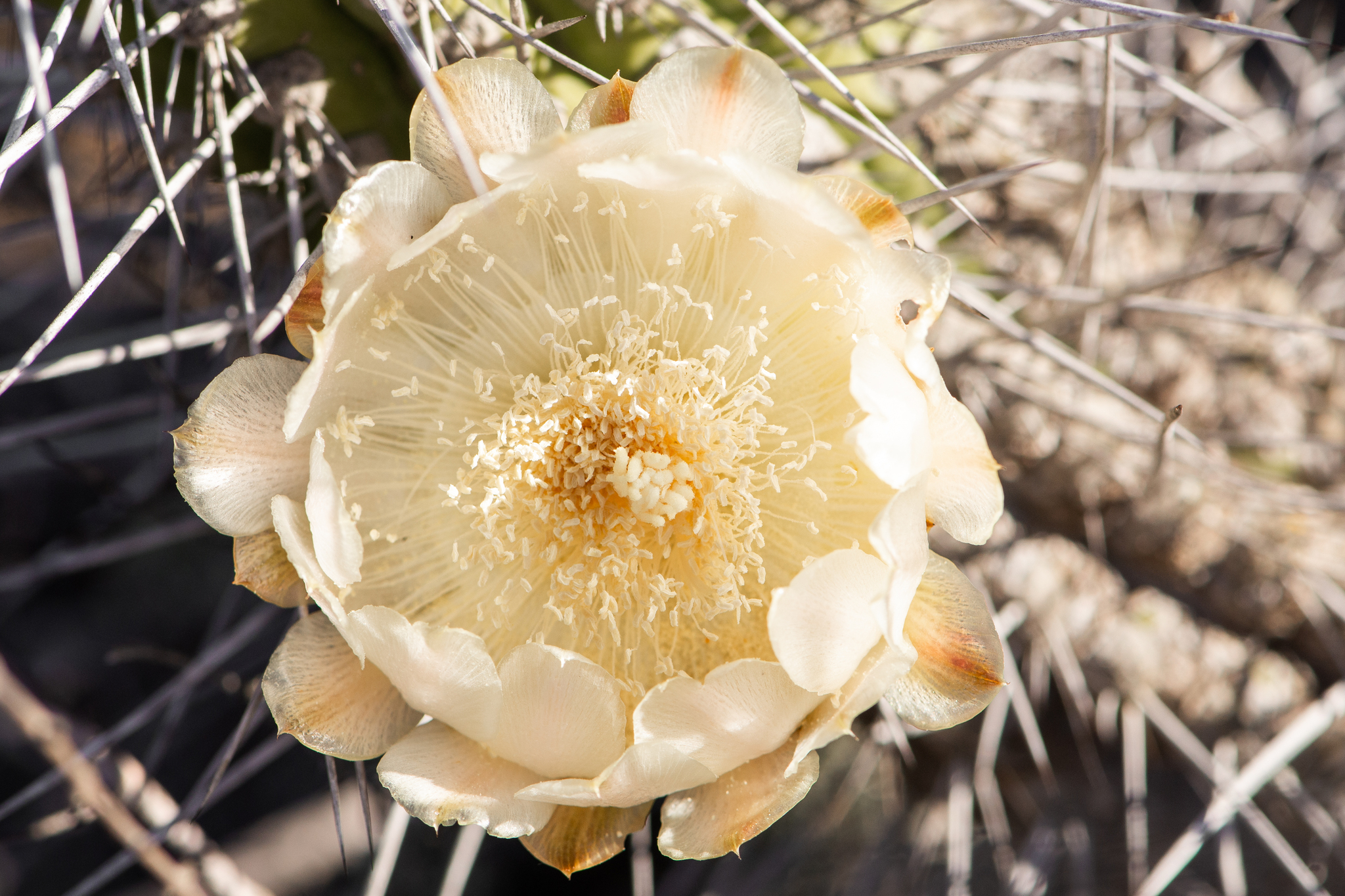
Flower closeup

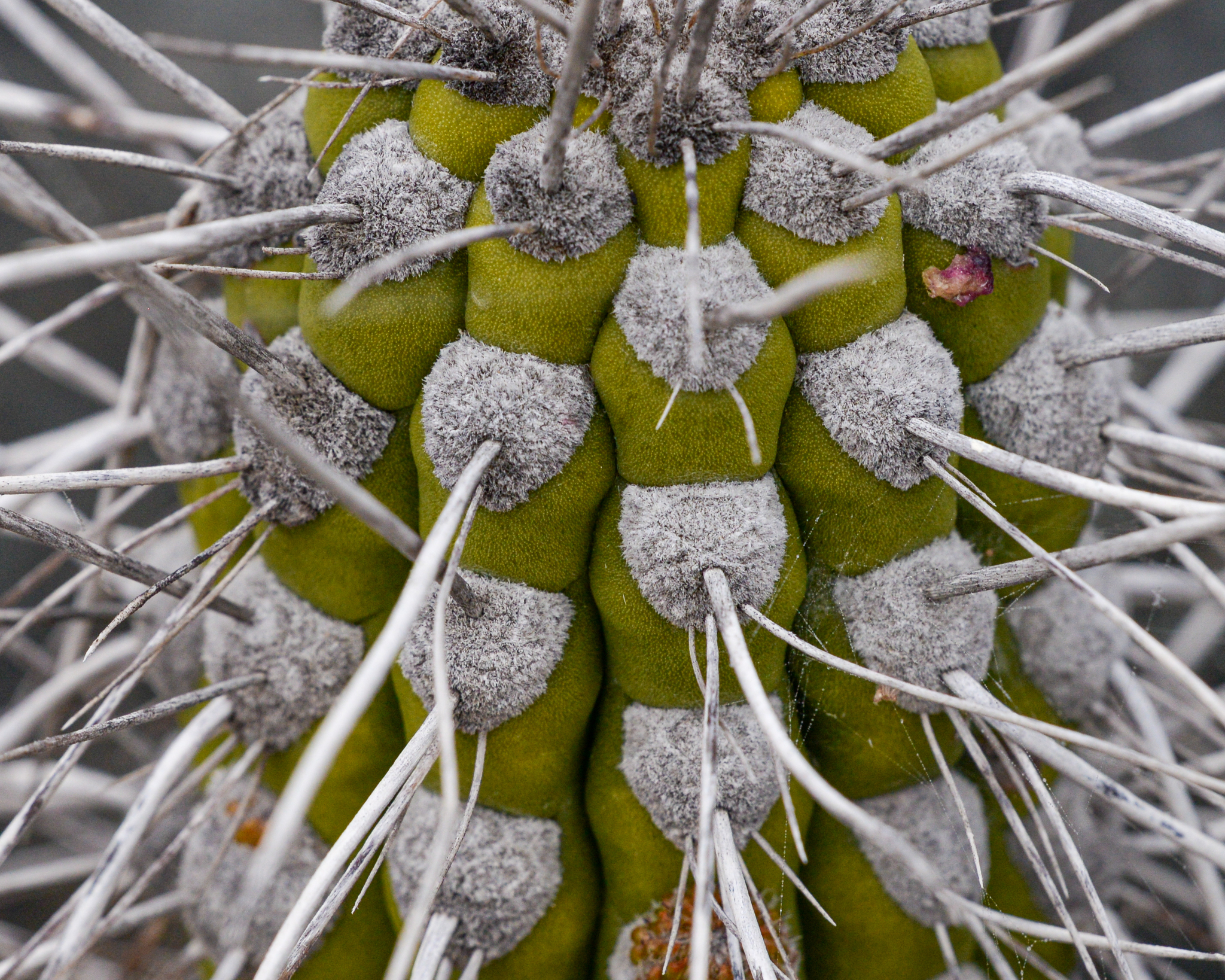
Spines and areoles closeup

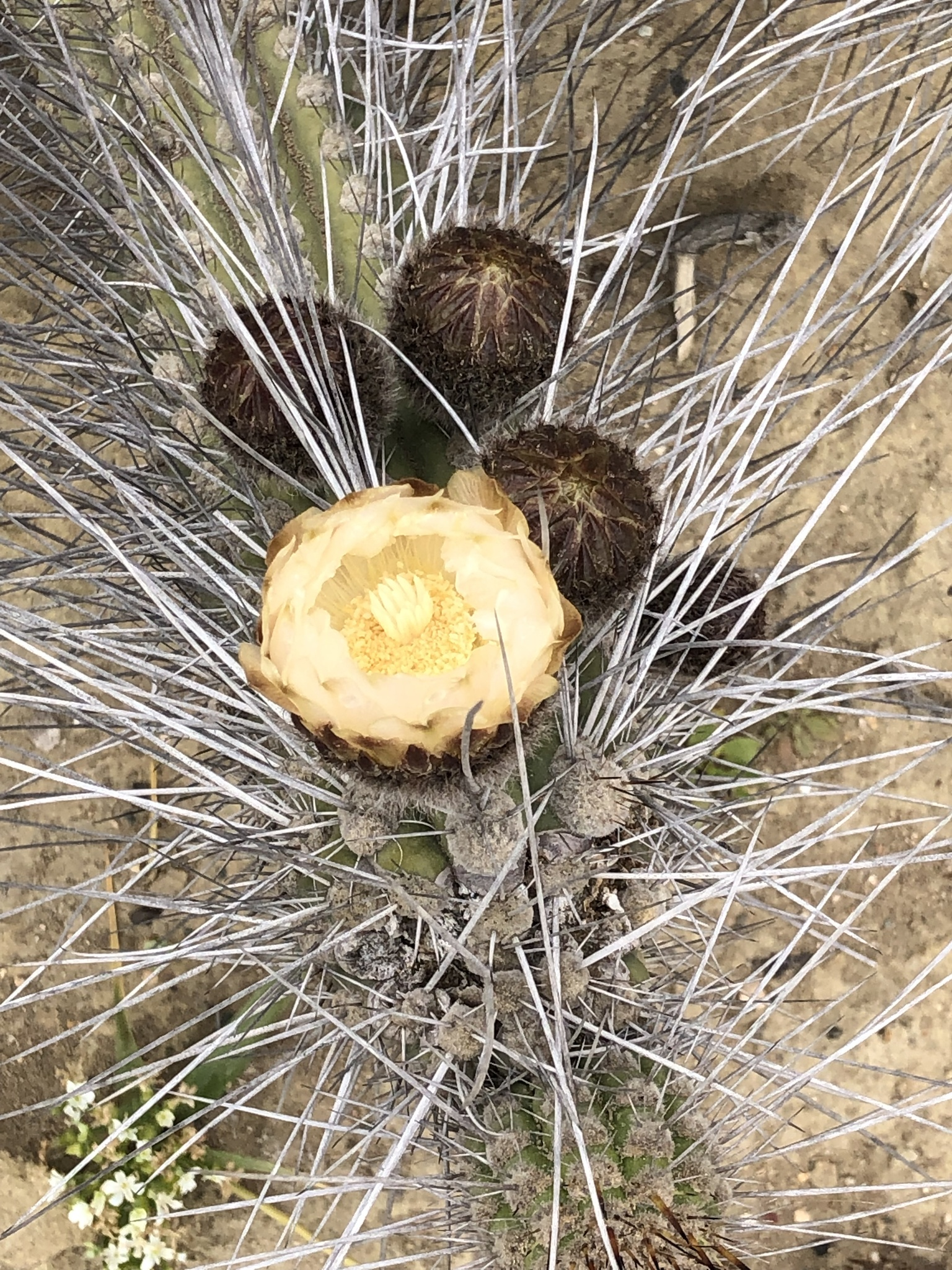
Flower and Fruits

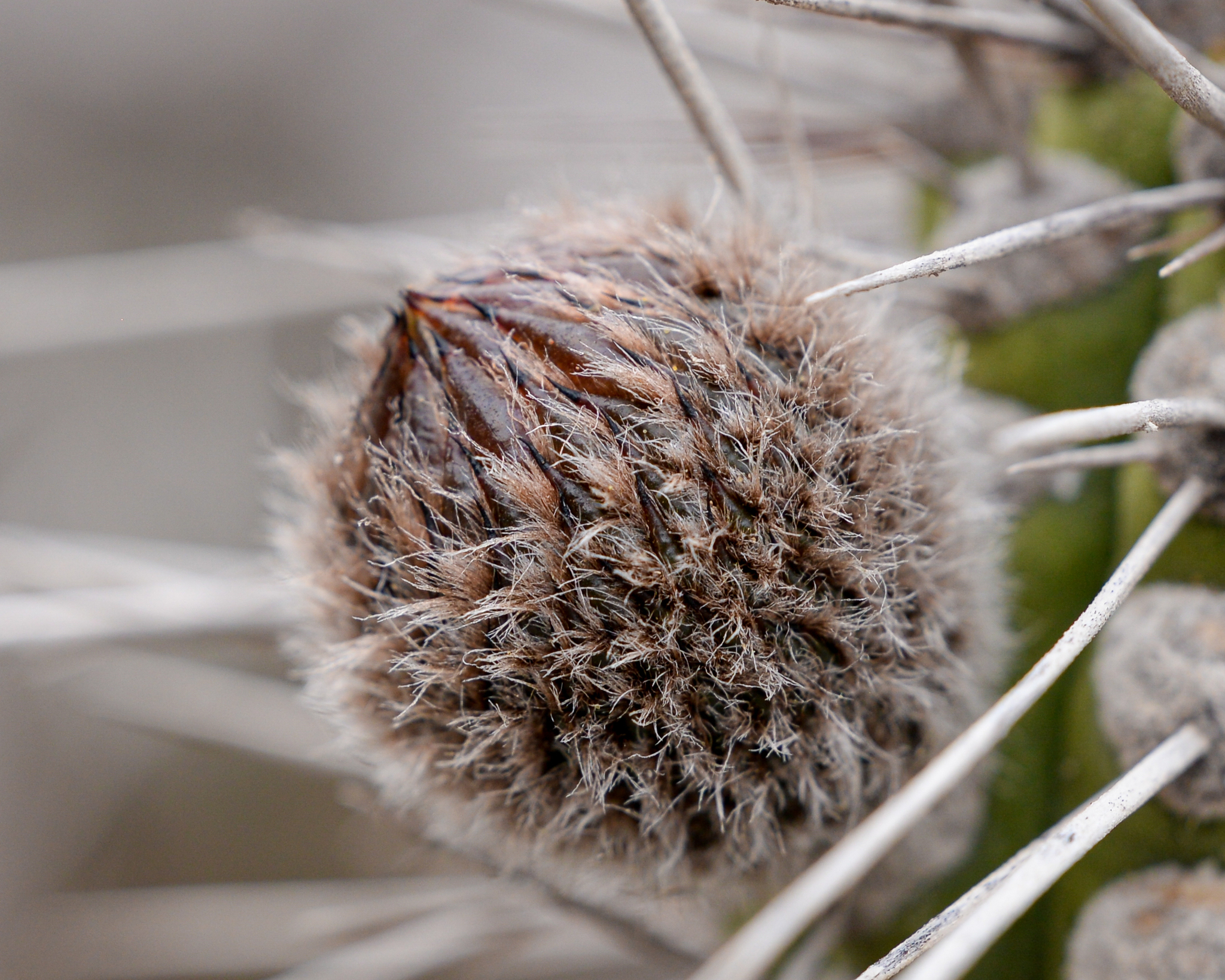
Fruit close up

== Distribution ==
This species is native to a restricted coastal strip in northern Chile, predominantly found on the sandy "Llano de Choros" plain situated between the Coquimbo and Atacama regions. Here, it grows in low-lying clumps, adapting to the windswept environment. Its range also extends to the hills north and east of this plain, though less commonly, and has been observed as far south as the Huasco River. The species also thrives on Chañaral and Damas Islands, where its sprawling stems provide crucial shelter for Humboldt penguin burrows, highlighting its ecological significance in coastal habitats. Primarily inhabiting desert and dry scrub ecosystems, it is found at lower altitudes but can also grow up to 1000 meters above sea level, showcasing its adaptability within its narrow coastal distribution.

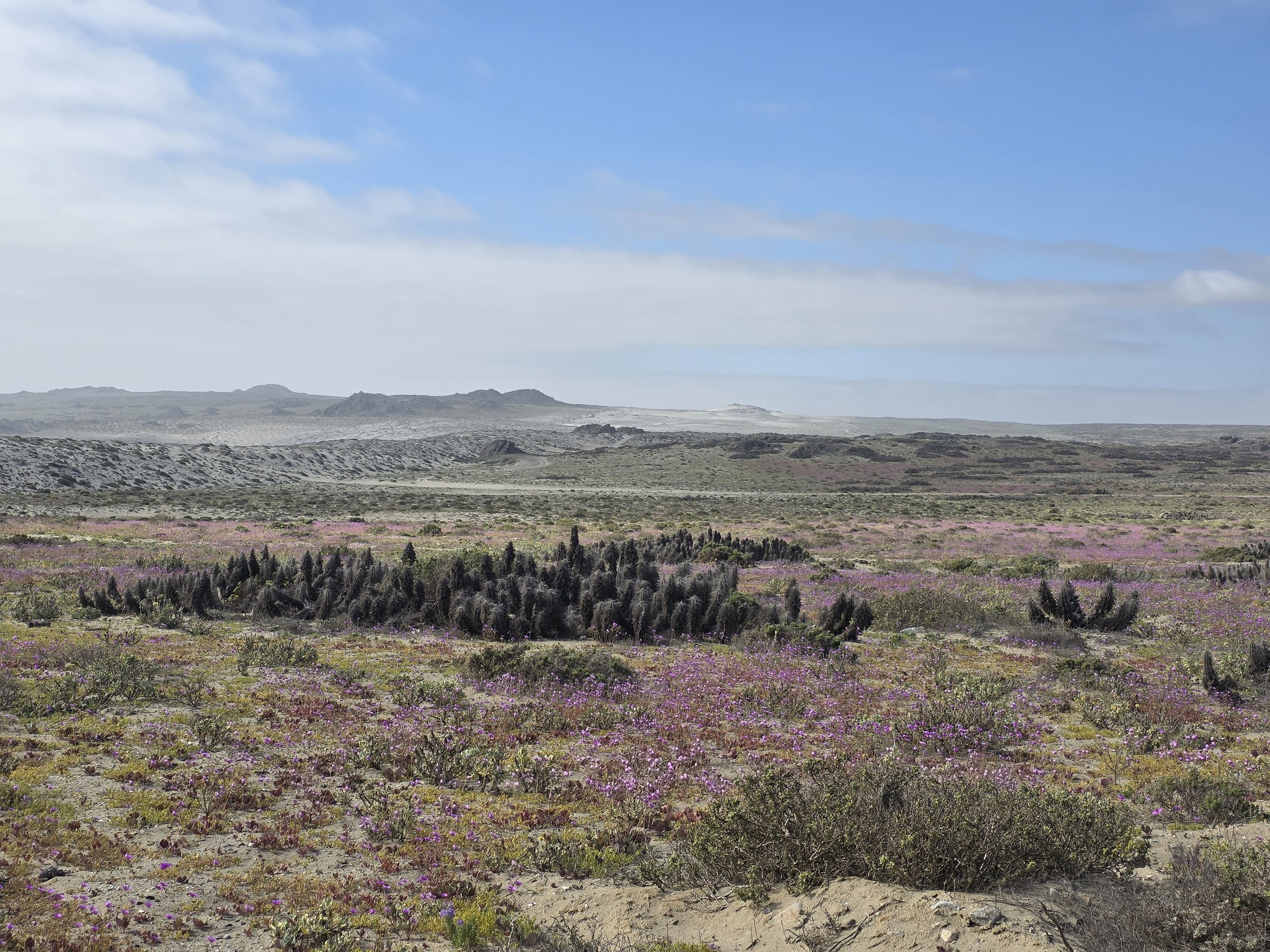
Habitat in Los Loritos, Freirina, Chile

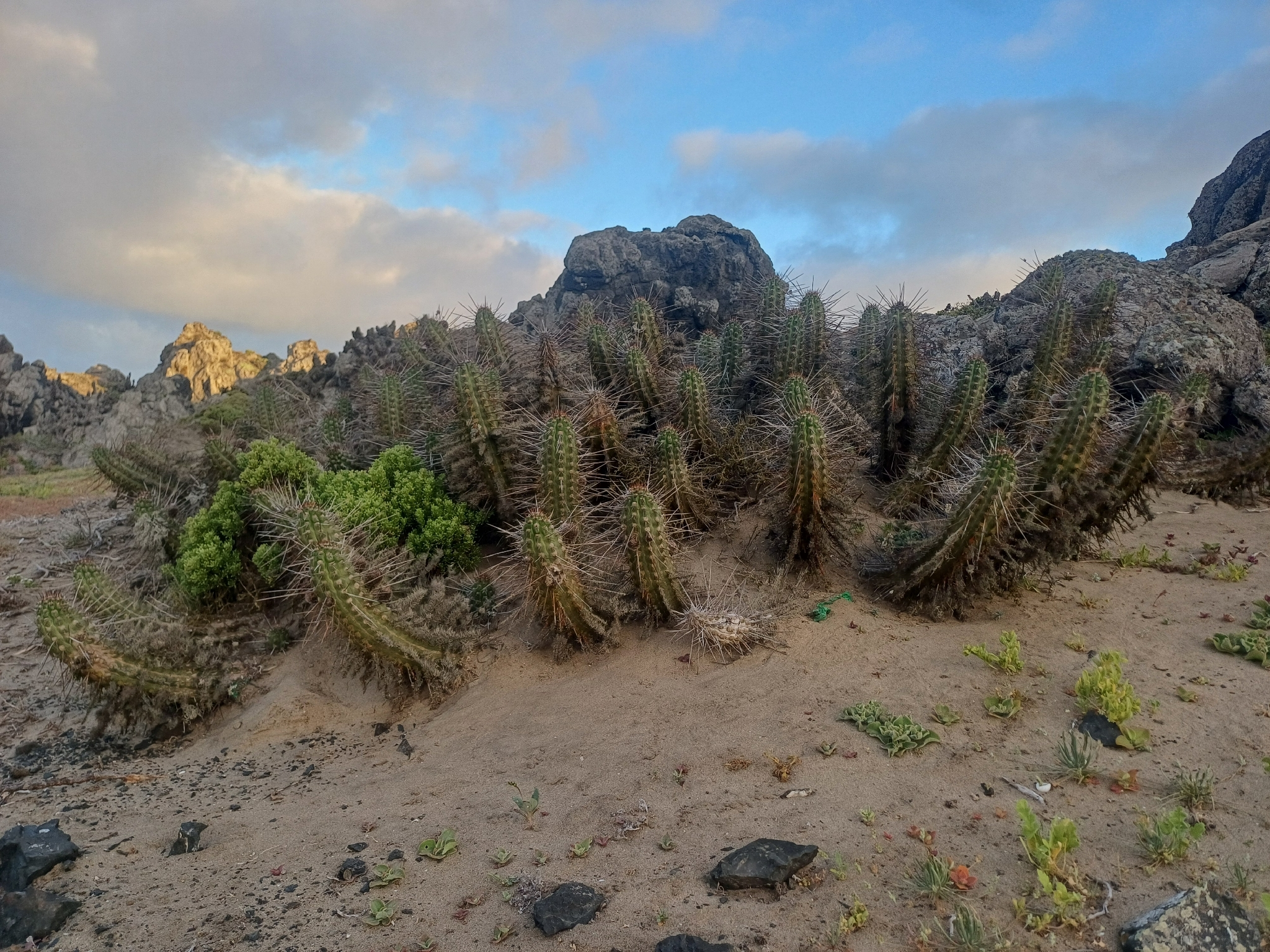
Plant in Caleta Chañaral, Freirina, Chile

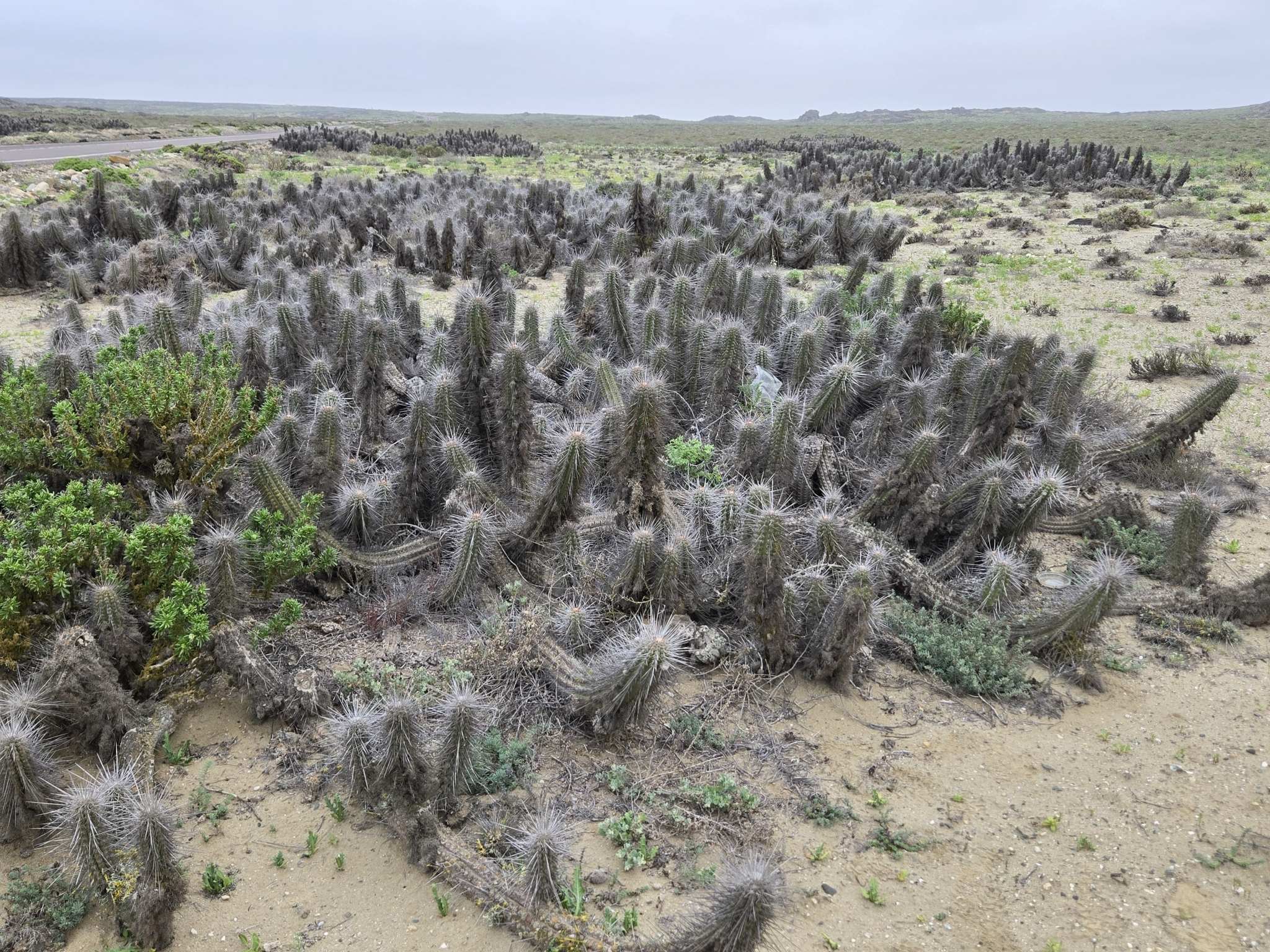
Large plant in Los Loritos, Freirina, Chile

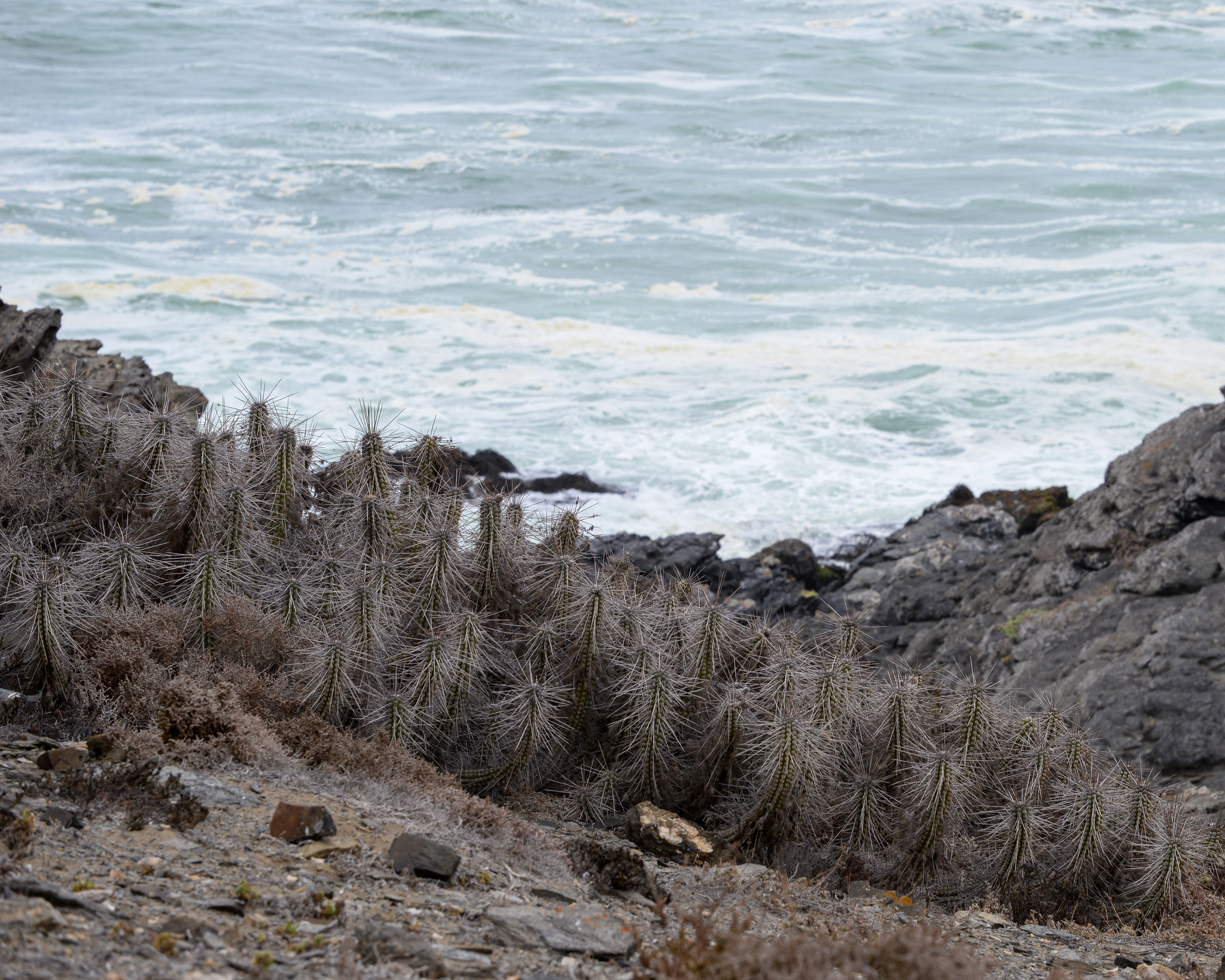
Plant growing in Punta de Choros, La Higuera, Chile

== Taxonomy ==
Eulychnia chorosensis, formally described by botanist Paul Klaassen in the Cactus and Succulent Journal in 2011, has a complex taxonomic history. Its origins trace back to 1980 when Friedrich Ritter identified a plant in Chile's Huasco River region, which he named Eulychnia acida var. procumbens. The epithet "chorosensis" refers to the Llanos de Choros, a coastal plain in Chile's Coquimbo region where the species is found, with the suffix "-ensis" commonly indicating geographical origin in scientific nomenclature. Ritter observed that this specimen, distinguished by black hairs on its floral tube, might represent a separate species, though he lacked sufficient data to confirm this at the time, noting its stunted nature and potential variation within Eulychnia acida.

Further complicating matters, the epithet "procumbens" had previously been used by Curt Backeberg in 1963 for Eulychnia procumbens, a distinct dwarf form of Eulychnia breviflora found near Bahía Inglesa. To prevent confusion between these two taxa and ensure nomenclatural stability, Paul Klaassen proposed the new specific name Eulychnia chorosensis for Ritter's Eulychnia acida var. procumbens.
