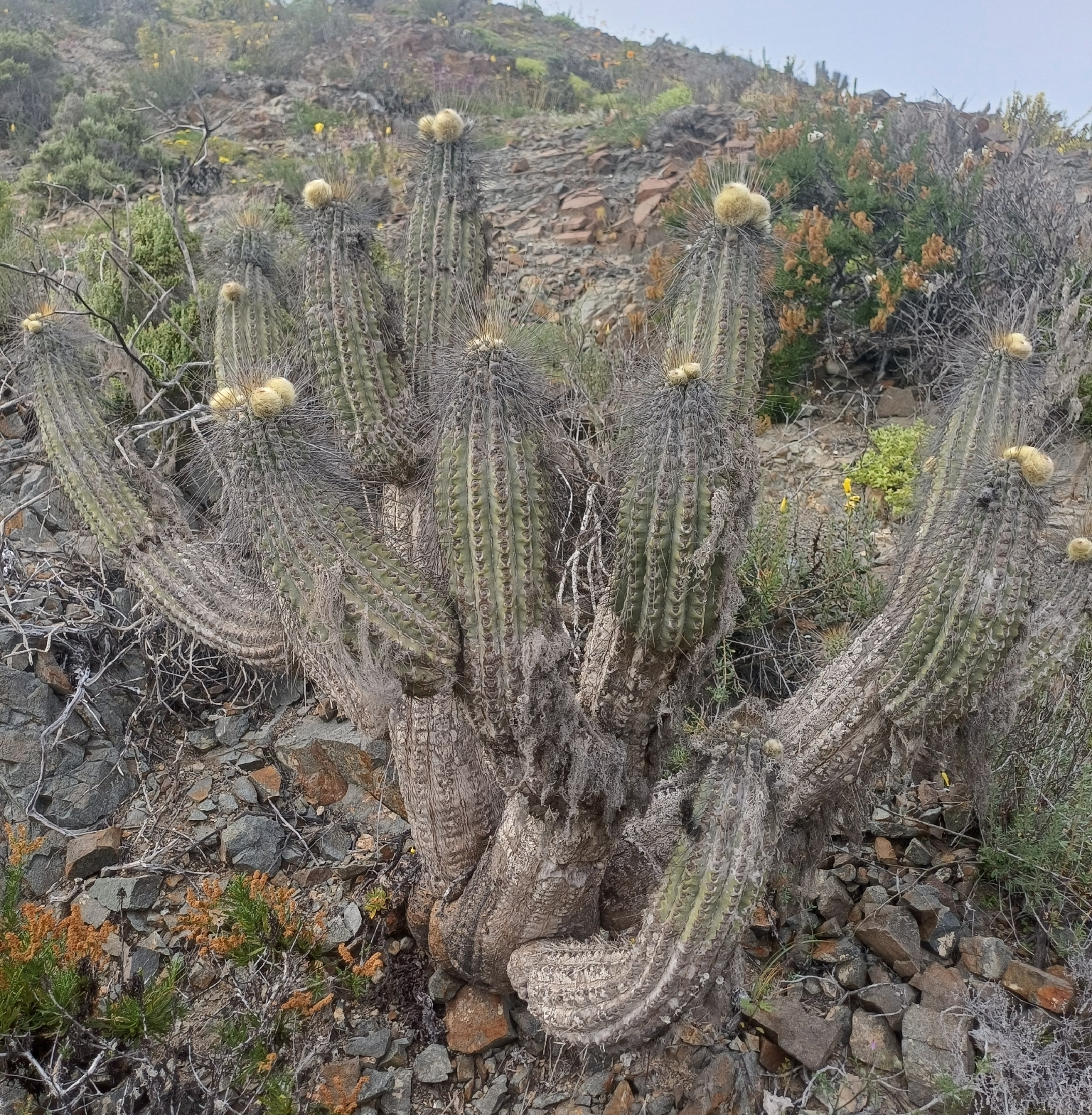

Conservation status
- Least Concern (IUCN 3.1)

Scientific classification
- Kingdom: Plantae
- Clade: Embryophytes
- Clade: Tracheophytes
- Clade: Spermatophytes
- Clade: Angiosperms
- Clade: Eudicots
- Order: Caryophyllales
- Family: Cactaceae
- Subfamily: Cactoideae
- Genus: Eulychnia
- Species: E. breviflora

Binomial name
- Eulychnia breviflora Phil. 1860

Synonyms
- Cereus coquimbanus K.Schum. 1903; Cereus chiloensis var. heteromorphus (Monv.) K.Schum. 1897; Cereus heteromorphus Monv. 1839; Cereus longispinus Salm-Dyck ex Otto & Dietr. 1845; Eulychnia barquitensis F.Ritter 1980; Eulychnia breviflora var. tenuis F.Ritter 1980; Eulychnia longispina (Salm-Dyck ex Otto & Dietr.) F.Ritter 1965; Eulychnia procumbens Backeb. 1963; Eulychnia saint-pieana F.Ritter 1964; Eulychnia saint-pieana var. barquitensis (F.Ritter) A.E.Hoffm. 1989; Eulychnia saint-pieana subsp. tenuis (F.Ritter) Guiggi 2020

= Eulychnia breviflora =

Species of cactus

Eulychnia breviflora is a species of Eulychnia found in Chile.

== Description ==
Eulychnia breviflora is a columnar cactus species with a tree-like habit, typically growing 2 to 3 meters tall, though it may reach only 1 to 2 meters in some locations. It grows erect, sometimes appearing slightly leaning at the base, and its epidermis is grass-green or grayish-green. Abundant branching occurs from the base up to about half the plant's height, with erect branches developing shoots that are 6 to 10 cm (2.4 to 3.9 in) thick. The stem features 10 to 13 blunt, toothed ribs, 8 to 15 mm (0.31 to 0.59 in) high and of similar width, separated by narrow, slightly sinuous grooves. Rounded areoles, 7 to 10 mm (0.28 to 0.39 in) in diameter, are covered in short, brownish-black felt that darkens to gray with age; young plants have lighter felt. These areoles are positioned on the upper part of the tubercles, extending to the indentations, and are spaced 1 to 1.5 cm (0.39 to 0.59 in) apart. The spines are dark brown, eventually turning gray, and are straight and needle-like, occasionally slightly curved. Even the longer central spines are sharp and lack blackening at the tip. There are 10 to 22 radial spines, typically unequal in length, ranging from a few millimeters to about 3 cm (1.2 in); they are more lateral in young plants and become more divergent and thinner with age. Three to six central spines are poorly differentiated, with usually only one or two being very long, measuring 5 to 15 cm (2.0 to 5.9 in), while the others are short. On upper shoots, all spines become thinner and arranged in a broom-like fashion, with the longer central spines resembling bristles or fine hairs; in these cases, the areoles are smaller and closer together. Flowers appear near the apex of older stems and are odorless, opening to a diameter of 5 to 6 cm (2.0 to 2.4 in) and a total length of 7 to 8 cm (2.8 to 3.1 in), with the ovary making up approximately half of this length. The top-shaped ovary is about 3 cm (1.2 in) in diameter, densely covered with narrow green scales, and its areoles bear brownish-black felt and abundant long, curly, golden-yellow wool that completely envelops it. A reduced nectary ring forms a hollow ring about 1 mm (0.039 in) high around the base of the style. The floral tube, over 2 cm (0.79 in) long and about 1.5 cm (0.59 in) wide at the top, is cup-shaped and externally similar to the ovary. White stamens are inserted in the lower half of the tube and at its rim. The style is approximately 2.5 cm (0.98 in) long and 6 to 7 mm (0.24 to 0.28 in) thick, with about half of its length comprising roughly 25 pale yellow stigmatic lobes. The white petals, often pinkish at the top with brownish tips, are about 2.5 cm (0.98 in) long and 1.5 cm (0.59 in) wide, with blunt to slightly pointed apices. The fruit is roughly globose, green, about 6 cm (2.4 in) in diameter, and covered like the ovary. Its pulp is white, acidic, and completely fills the fruit. The seeds are about 2 mm (0.079 in) long, 1.2 mm (0.047 in) wide, and 0.5 mm (0.020 in) thick, appearing black or with a brown coating. They are matte, very convex dorsally, somewhat keeled, pointed at the base, and nearly smooth or very finely granular. The narrow, white, slightly sunken hilum is located on the ventral side.

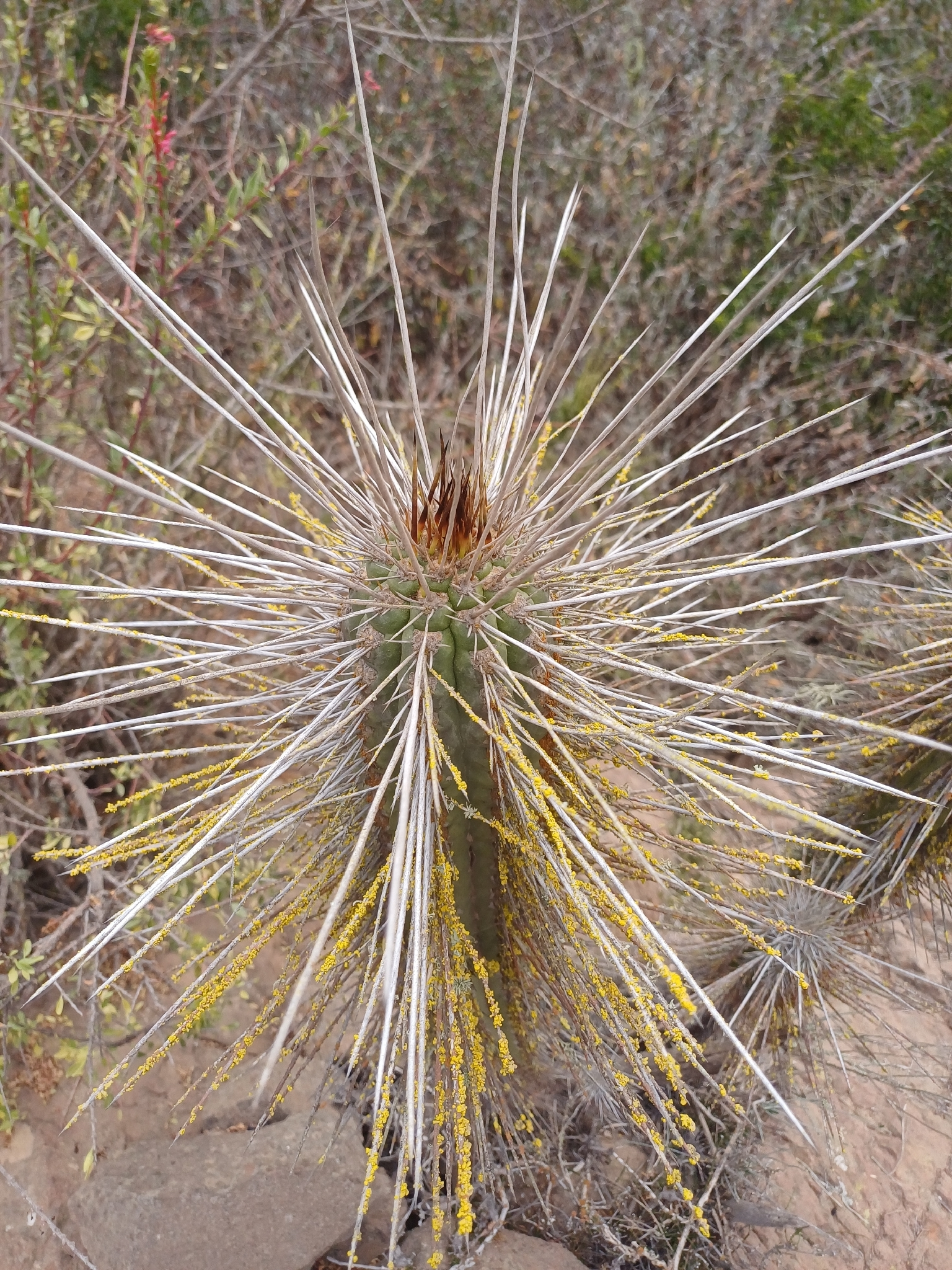
Spines

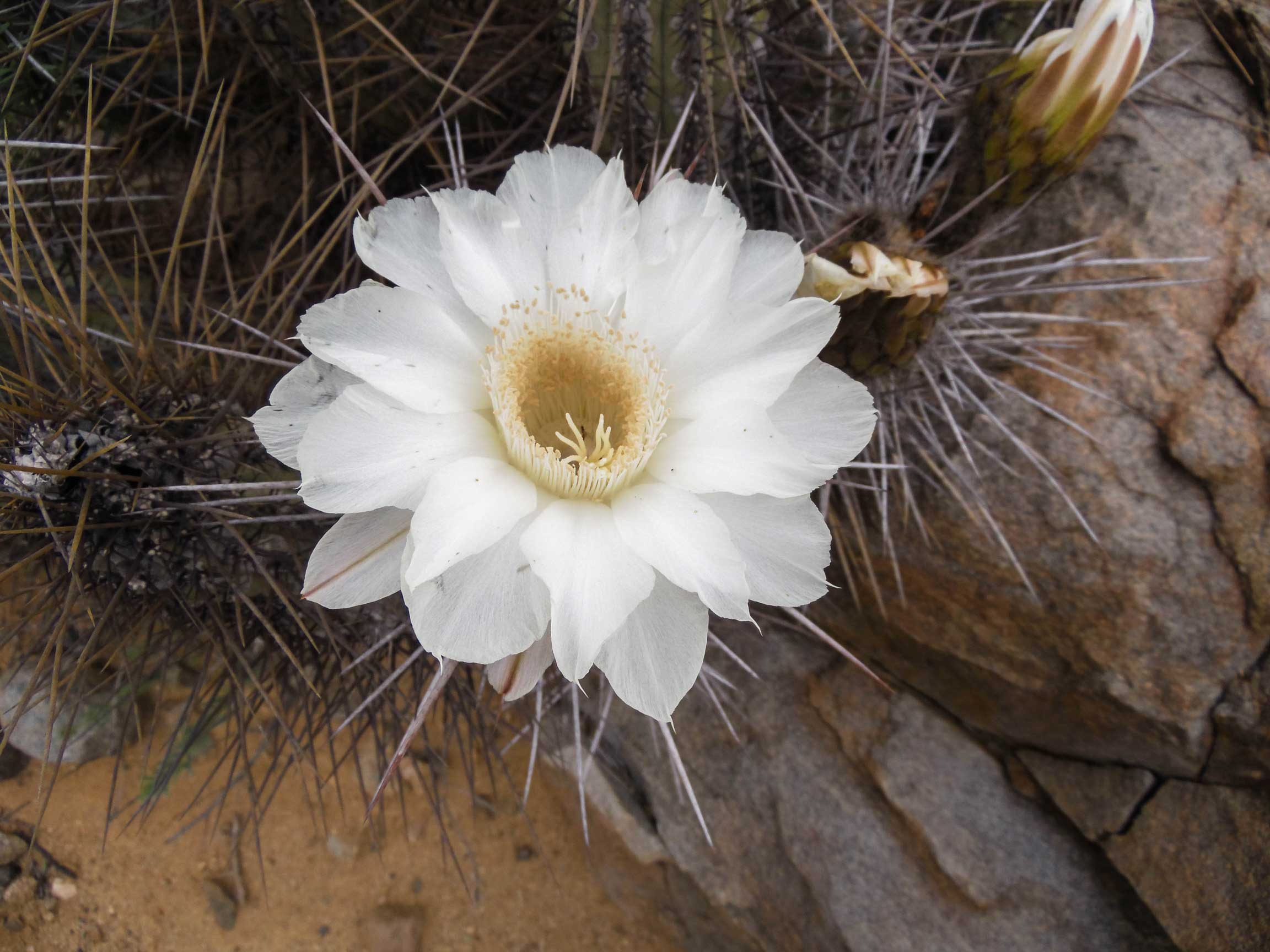
Flowers

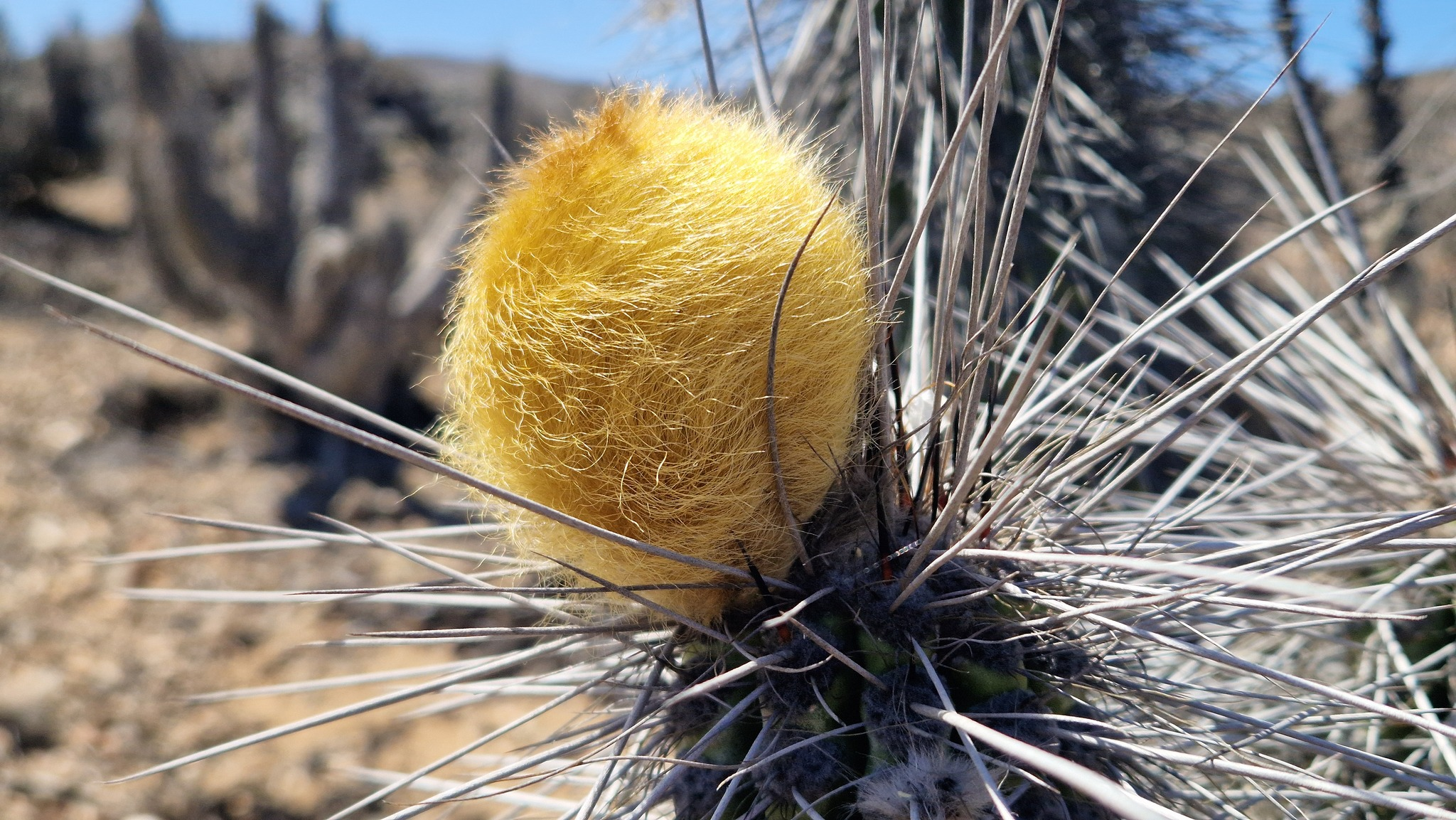
Fruit

== Distribution ==
Eulychnia breviflora is native to northern Chile, extending from the western Atacama region to the northwest of the Coquimbo region, primarily along the coastal strip. It inhabits desert and dry scrub biomes from sea level to approximately 400 meters, establishing on coastal hills, slopes, or in thorny scrub on sandy soils in arid, sparsely vegetated environments. While highly tolerant of drought, its low rainfall is supplemented by frequent coastal fogs, which often form a consistent daily cloud band. This humidity can lead to lichen growth on coastal specimens. The species' range near the coast overlaps with Eulychnia acida, and natural hybridization between the two has been observed.

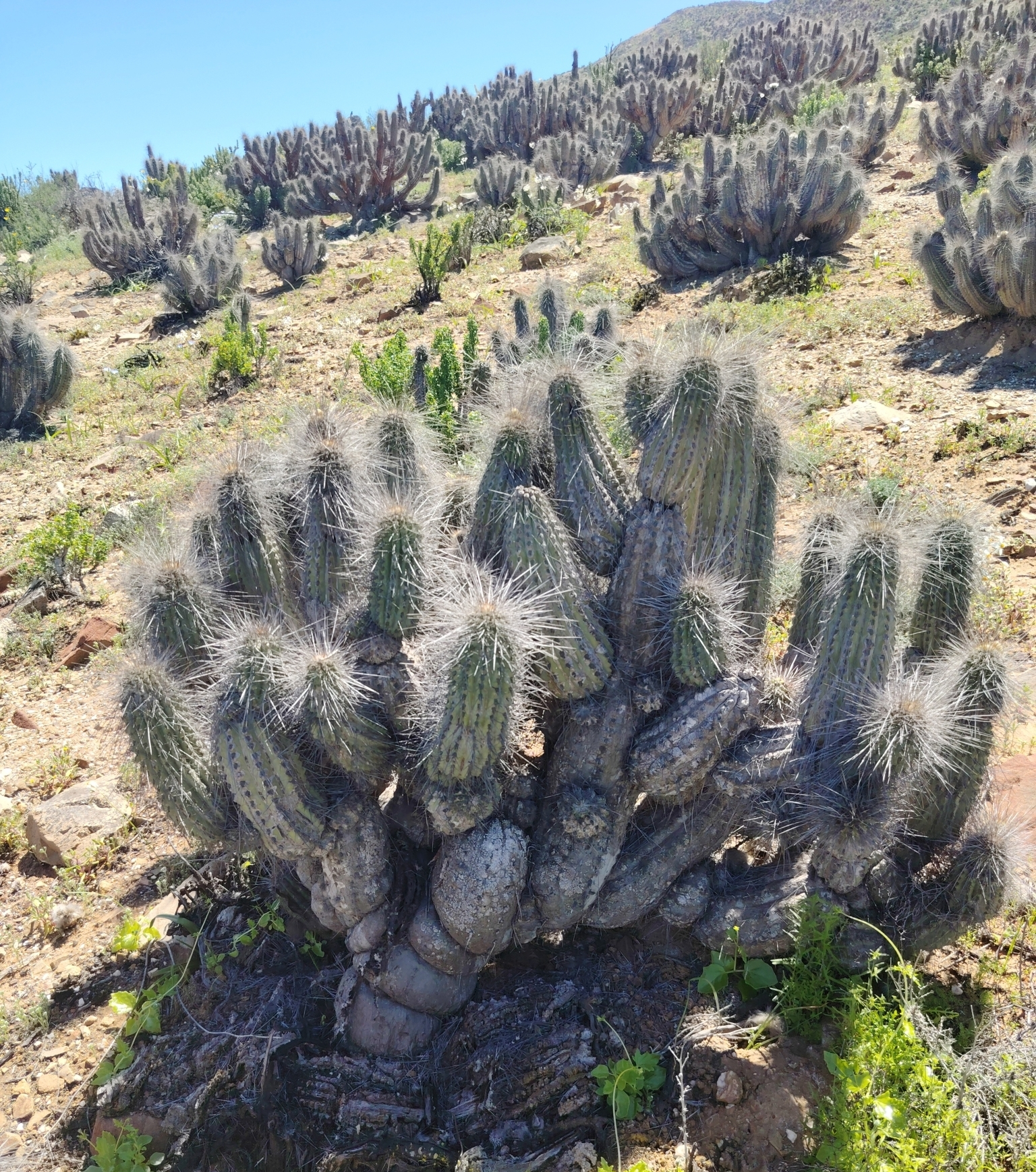
Habitat in Huasco, Chile

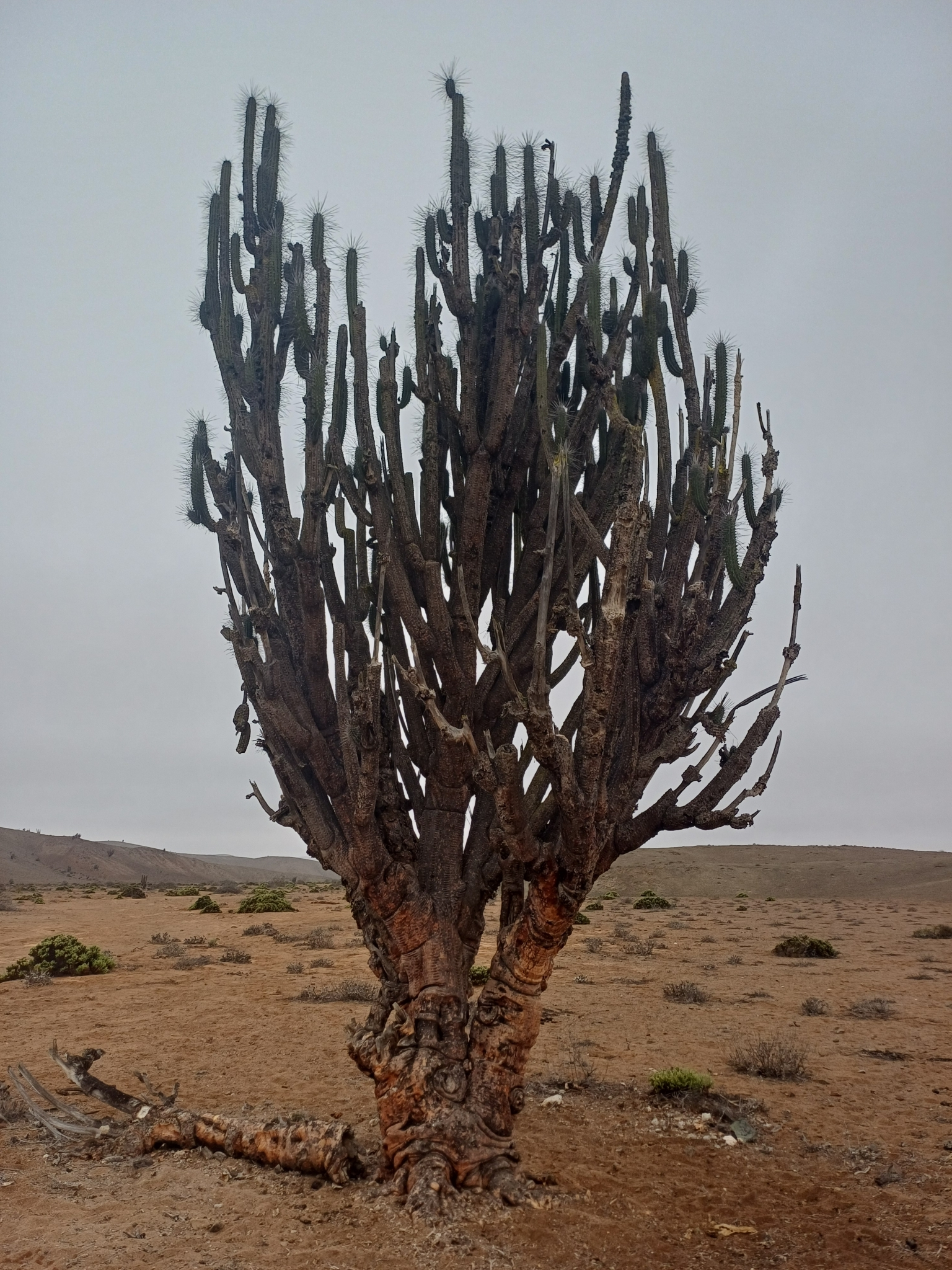
Mature plant in Carrizal Alto, Huasco, Chile

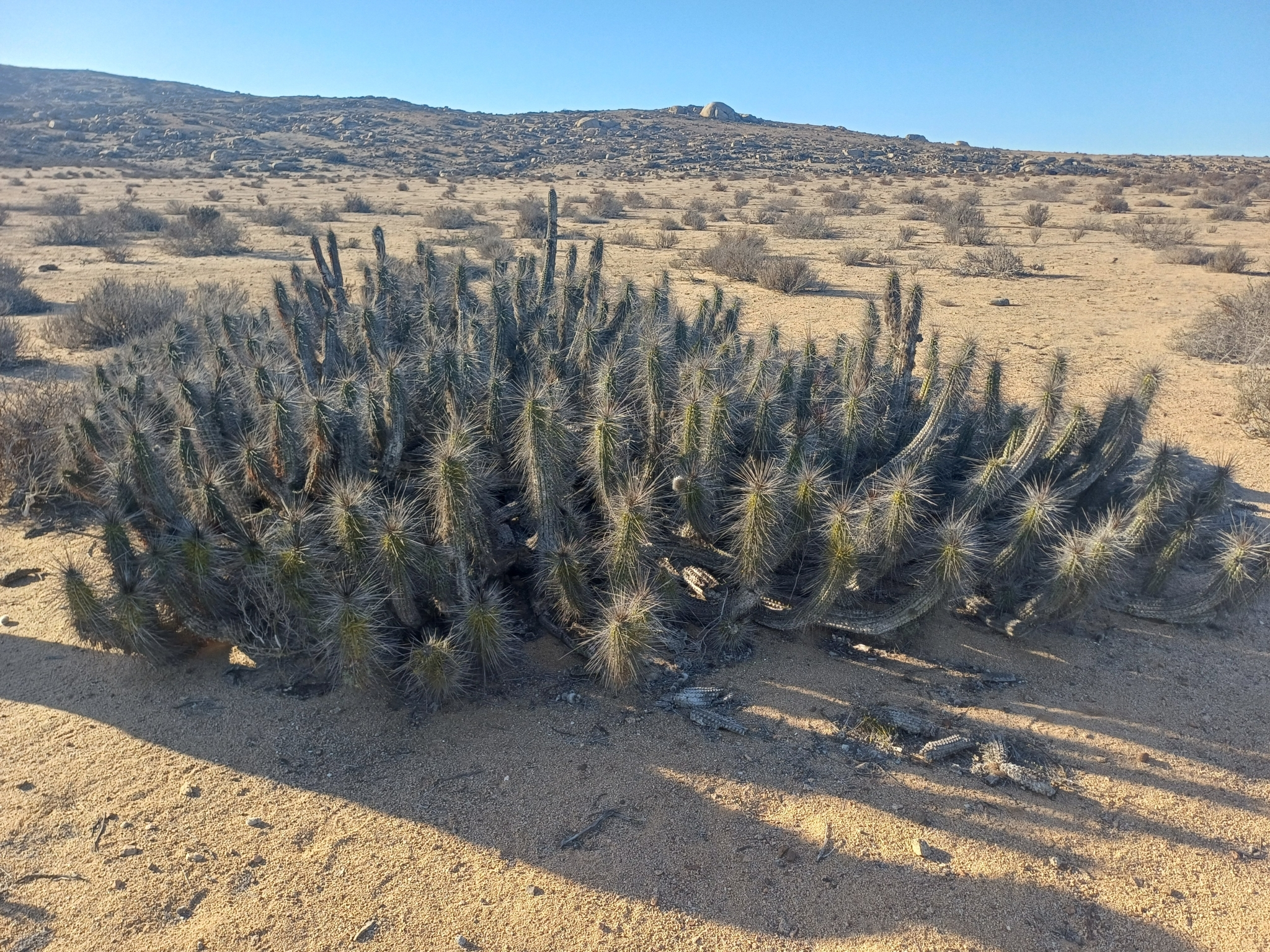
Plant in Majada el Tomate, Caldera, Chile

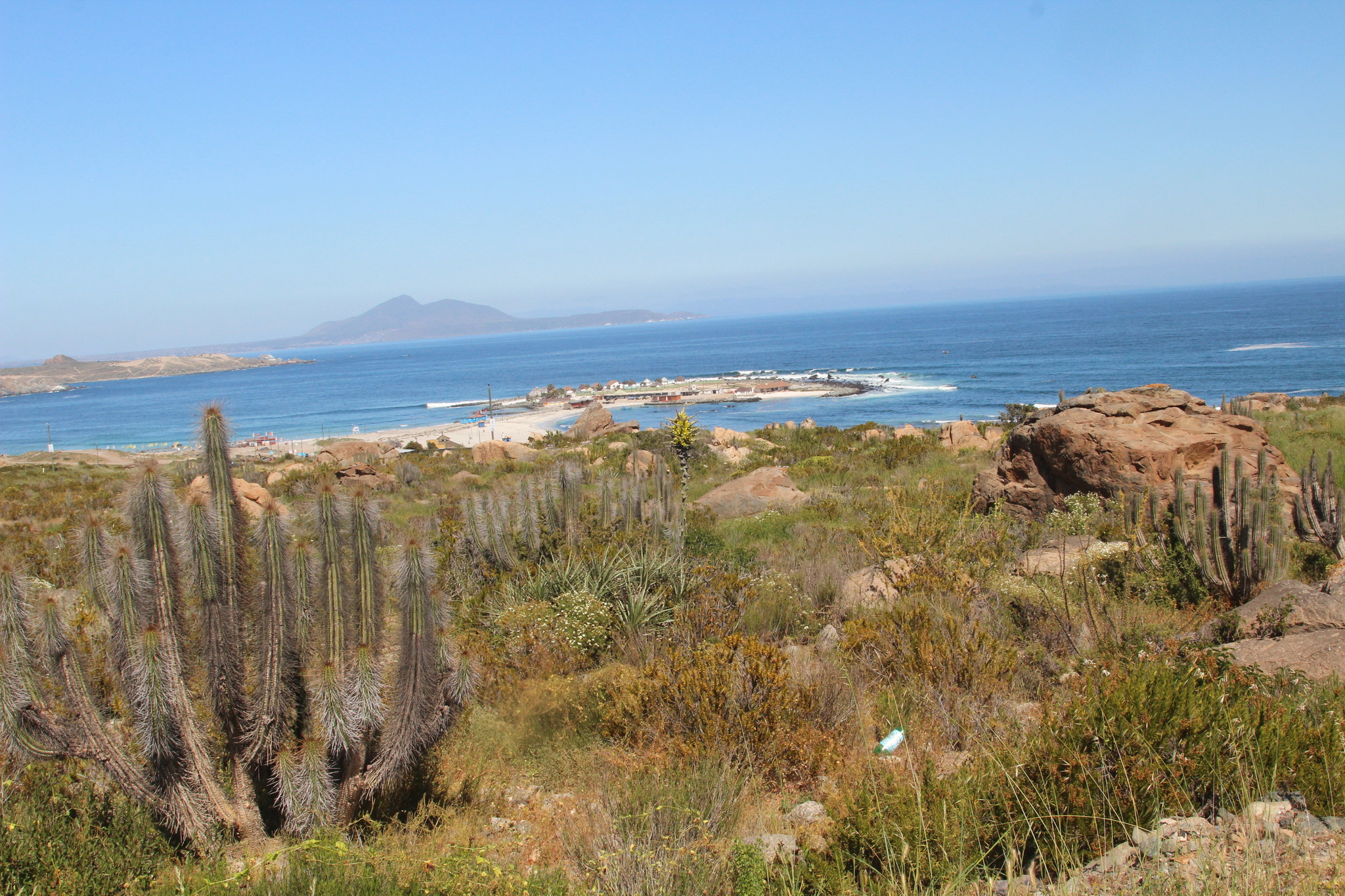
Habitat in Totoralillo, Coquimbo, Chile

== Taxonomy ==
First published by Rodulfo Amando Philippi in his 1860 work Florula Atacamensis seu Enumeriatio, the specific epithet breviflora is derived from the Latin words for "short" and "flowered," referencing the short floral tube.
