= C. occultus =

C. occultus may refer to:

- Centropogon occultus, a species of flowering plant
- Chlaenius occultus, a species of beetle
- Chthonius occultus, a species of pseudoscorpion in the genus Chthonius
- Copelatus occultus, a species of beetle
- Cryptoerithus occultus, a species of spider in the genus Cryptoerithus
- Ctenomys occultus, a species of rodent
