= C. ursinus =

C. ursinus may refer to:

- Callorhinus ursinus, a seal species
- Canis ursinus, a prehistoric canine species in the genus Canis
- Centropogon ursinus, a plant species

== See also ==
- Ursinus (disambiguation)
