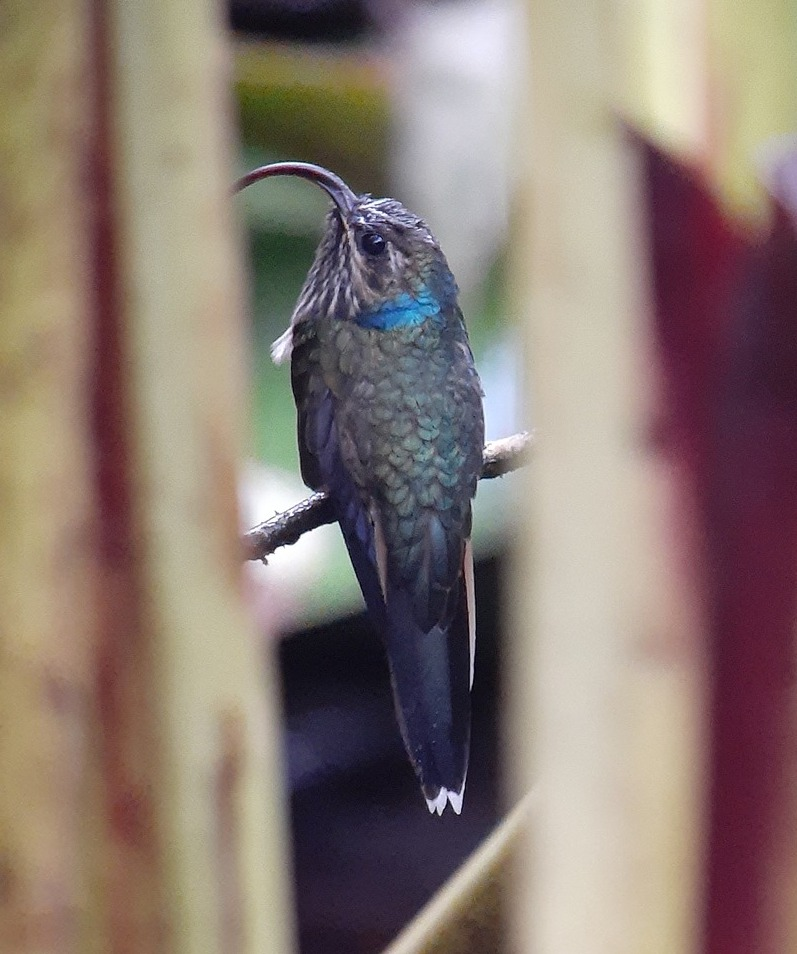

Conservation status
- Least Concern (IUCN 3.1)
- CITES Appendix II (CITES)

Scientific classification
- Kingdom: Animalia
- Phylum: Chordata
- Class: Aves
- Clade: Strisores
- Order: Apodiformes
- Family: Trochilidae
- Genus: Eutoxeres
- Species: E. condamini

Binomial name
- Eutoxeres condamini (Bourcier, 1851)

Synonyms
- Trochilus condamini Bourcier, 1851

= Buff-tailed sicklebill =

Species of hummingbird

Epimachus albertisi, a bird-of-paradise from New Guinea, is also sometimes called "buff-tailed sicklebill".

The buff-tailed sicklebill (Eutoxeres condamini) is a species of hermit hummingbird from the lower Andes and adjacent west Amazonian lowlands from southern Colombia and northern Ecuador to Peru and Bolivia.

== Description ==
With a total length of 5–6 in (13–15 cm) and weighing 0.28–0.44 oz (7.9–12.5 g), it is a relatively large hummingbird. Males and females are virtually identical, differing only in size (especially wing measurements), with the females being some 20% smaller.

Its upperparts are iridescent dull greenish, while the underparts are whitish, densely streaked with dusky. The neck-side has a relatively faint blue patch. The tips of the rectrices (tail feathers) are white, and there is a naked stripe on top of the head (but this is usually concealed). The most conspicuous features, however, are those the common name refers to: the bill is strongly decurved, and the outer three rectrices on each side are deep buff, best visible from below.

Immature birds have light-tipped remiges (pinions), hardly any blue on the neck, and lack the naked crown stripe. Hatchlings have black skin and grey down.

There are two subspecies which are not very distinct and almost form a continuous cline, with an extensive intergradation zone in northern Peru:

- Eutoxeres condamini condamini (Bourcier, 1851) – northern buff-tailed sicklebill

Colombia and Ecuador. Bill longer, lower belly much streaked

- Eutoxeres condamini gracilis Berlepsch & Stolzmann, 1902 – southern buff-tailed sicklebill

Central Peru to Bolivia. Bill shorter, lower belly less streaked

The buff outer remiges are the most reliable trait for separating the buff-tailed sicklebill from the only other member of the genus Eutoxeres, the white-tipped sicklebill (E. aquila), which has a more northerly distribution. The Eutoxeres species are somewhat sympatric however, for example in the foothills of Putumayo around Mocoa, Colombia.

== Ecology ==
It is restricted to the undergrowth of humid forested and wooded habitats, recorded from 590–10,800 ft (180–3,290 m) ASL. It will tolerate more habitat disturbance than its congener, regularly occurring in plantations, bamboo stands and open habitat where populations are healthy, though it still prefers natural vegetation. Nothing precise is known about its movements, though it is presumed that the birds are non-migratory. The peculiar bill is an adaption to the shape of certain flowers, namely of the genera Centropogon and Heliconia. It feeds mainly by trap-lining. In addition to nectar, it will also catch small arthropods.

The two white eggs are laid in a nest which is attached to the underside of a leaf, a few yards/meters above ground. In the southern Cordillera Oriental of Colombia, nest construction was observed in July or August, and in the lowlands of Ecuador's Napo Province in January. Birds with enlarged gonads were found in Peru from September to November. Only the female incubates; the incubation period is 16–18 days and the young fledge 22–24 days after hatching. They start to breed when they are 1–2 years old.

Generally fairly common though inconspicuous and easily overlooked, it is considered a species of Least Concern by the IUCN. This species is most easily seen in the mixed habitat of old and young forest and small-scale logging at the Napo River in eastern Ecuador.
