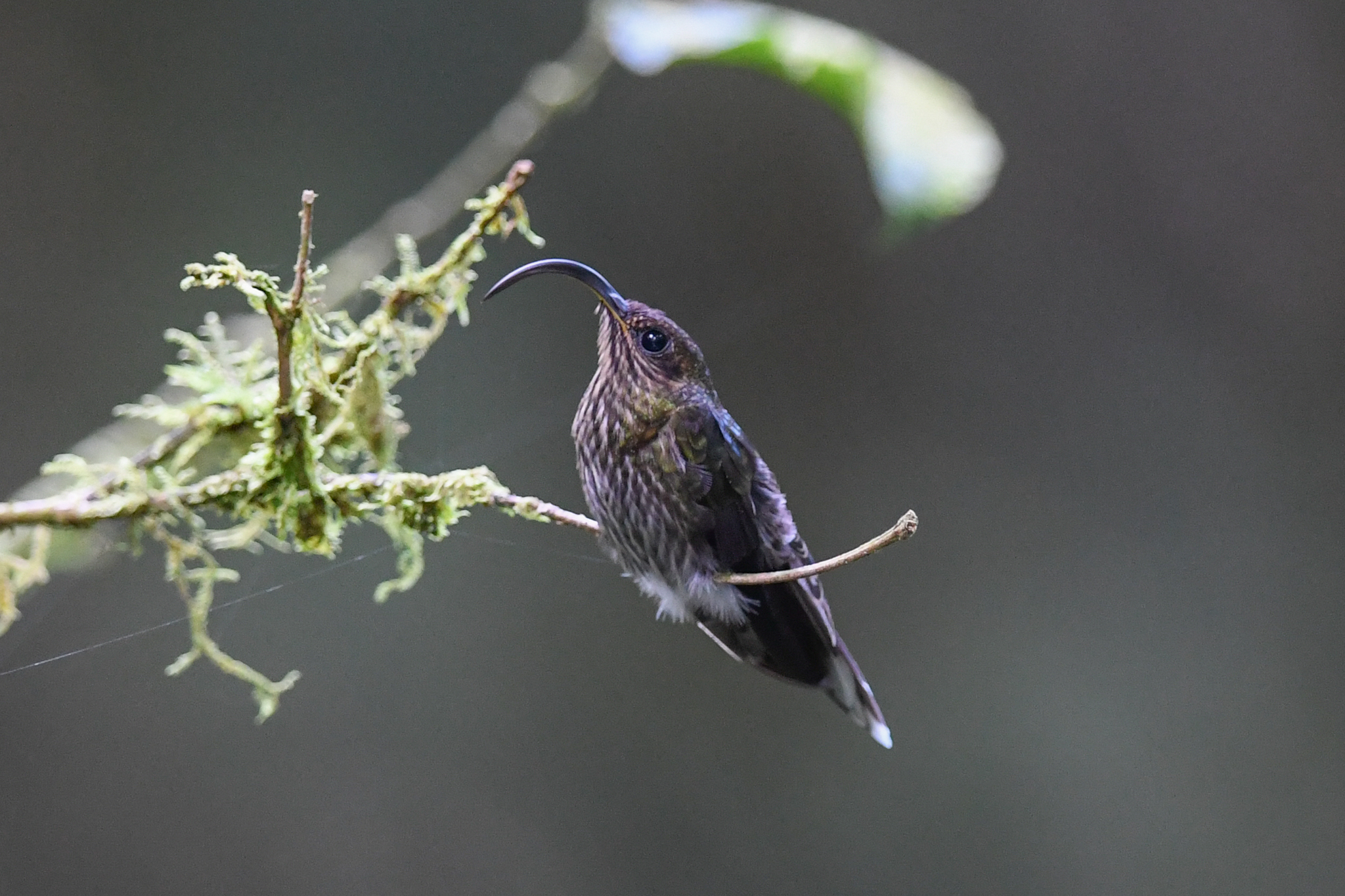

Conservation status
- Least Concern (IUCN 3.1)
- CITES Appendix II

Scientific classification
- Kingdom: Animalia
- Phylum: Chordata
- Class: Aves
- Order: Apodiformes
- Family: Trochilidae
- Genus: Eutoxeres
- Species: E. aquila

Binomial name
- Eutoxeres aquila (Bourcier, 1847)

Audio

= White-tipped sicklebill =

Species of hummingbird

The white-tipped sicklebill (Eutoxeres aquila) is a species of hummingbird in the family Trochilidae. It is found in Colombia, Costa Rica, Ecuador, Panama, Peru, and Venezuela.

== Taxonomy and systematics ==
The white-tipped sicklebill shares the genus Eutoxeres with the buff-tailed sicklebill (E. condamini). It has three subspecies, the nominate E. a. aquila, E. a. salvini, and E. a. heterurus.

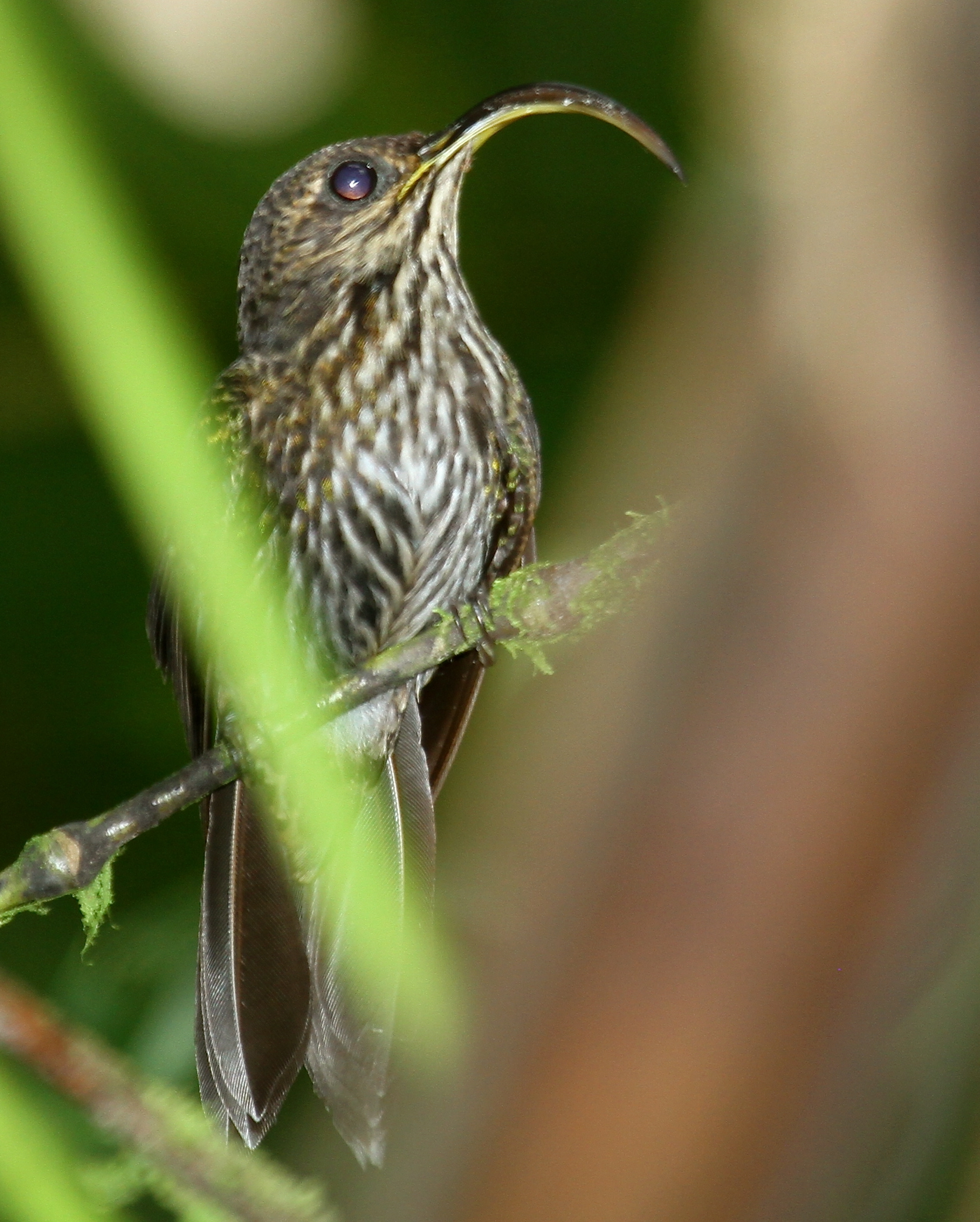
White-tipped sicklebill

== Description ==
The white-tipped sicklebill's most prominent feature is its strongly decurved bill that arcs through a quarter circle; the maxilla is black and the mandible yellow. The species is about 11.5 to 13.5 cm (4.5 to 5.3 in) long and weighs about 8.6 to 14.5 g (0.30 to 0.51 oz). The sexes are alike in plumage. Adults' upperparts are green, their throat and chest blackish, and the rest of the underparts striped green and white. The tail is mostly green, with the outer pair of feathers more dusky with white tips. Juveniles appear scaly.

== Distribution and habitat ==
The northernmost subspecies of white-tipped sicklebill, E. a. salvini, is found in Costa Rica, Panama, and western Colombia. E. a. heterurus is found from Colombia's Cauca Department south through western Ecuador, and there is also at least one record in Mérida of western Venezuela. The nominate E. a. aquila is found from eastern Colombia south through eastern Ecuador into northern Peru. The species inhabits the understory of montane evergreen forest. In Costa Rica, it ranges between 300 and 700 m (980 and 2,300 ft) of elevation on the Caribbean side and 1,000 and 1,200 m (3,300 and 3,900 ft) on the Pacific side. In western Colombia, it is found from sea level to 1,400 m (4,600 ft) and in the Magdalena River valley between 1,600 and 2,100 m (5,200 and 6,900 ft). In Peru, it is found between 750 and 2,000 m (2,460 and 6,560 ft).

== Behavior ==
=== Feeding ===
The white-tipped sicklebill primarily feeds on nectar. Its curved bill is an adaption to the shape of flowers, especially those of genera Centropogon and Heliconia, and it typically clings to the flower as it feeds. It is a "trap-line" feeder, visiting a circuit of flowering plants and not defending any particular area. Sicklebills also feed on insects by gleaning them from spiderwebs or trunks and branches.

=== Breeding ===
Male white-tipped sicklebills display for females in leks with a U-shaped flight; they are polygynous. The species' breeding seasons vary across its range and it appears to often breed twice per year. The female builds a cup nest that hangs from the underside of Heliconia or larger leaves, and sometimes from human structures such as bridges and the ceilings of buildings. The nest is woven from rootlets, hair, fungal rhizomes, and plant fibers bound with spider web. The clutch size is two eggs.

=== Vocalization ===
The white-tipped sicklebill's song is "a complex series of thin, whiny squeaks followed by some strident, high, tseep notes." There appears to be some geographic variation in it. One description of its call is "high, thin, sharp piercing tsitting notes".

== Status ==
The IUCN has assessed the white-tipped sicklebill as being of Least Concern, though its population has not been quantified and its trend is not known. It is "a forest-dwelling species that depends on flowers for nectar, and so could be threatened by forest fragmentation."
