= M. ursinus =

M. ursinus may refer to:

- Macaca ursinus, a macaque species in the genus Macaca
- Melursus ursinus, a bear species
- Microporus ursinus, a plant pathogen species

== See also ==
- Ursinus (disambiguation)
