= P. ursinus =

P. ursinus may refer to:

- Papio ursinus, a baboon species
- Paruromys ursinus, a rat species

== See also ==
- Ursinus (disambiguation)
