= Centropogon hartwegii =

Conservation status
- Endangered (IUCN 3.1)

Scientific classification
- Kingdom: Plantae
- Clade: Tracheophytes
- Clade: Angiosperms
- Clade: Eudicots
- Clade: Asterids
- Order: Asterales
- Family: Campanulaceae
- Genus: Centropogon
- Species: C. hartwegii

Binomial name
- Centropogon hartwegii (Benth.) Benth. & Hook.f. ex B.D.Jacks.

Synonyms
- Centropogon hartwegii var. parvus E.Wimm.; Siphocampylus hartwegii Benth.

Species of flowering plant

Centropogon hartwegii is a species of flowering plant in the family Campanulaceae. It is a shrub native to Colombia and Loja Province of Ecuador. Its natural habitat is páramo (tropical high-elevation grassland) from 3,000 to 3,500 meters elevation.

The species was first described as Siphocampylus hartwegii by George Bentham in 1845. In 1895 Benjamin Daydon Jackson placed the species in genus Centropogon as C. hartwegii.
