= Centropogon rubiginosus =

Conservation status
- Endangered (IUCN 3.1)

Scientific classification
- Kingdom: Plantae
- Clade: Tracheophytes
- Clade: Angiosperms
- Clade: Eudicots
- Clade: Asterids
- Order: Asterales
- Family: Campanulaceae
- Genus: Centropogon
- Species: C. rubiginosus

Binomial name
- Centropogon rubiginosus E.Wimm.

Species of flowering plant

Centropogon rubiginosus is a species of plant in the family Campanulaceae.

== Distribution and habitat ==
Centropogon rubiginosus is endemic to Ecuador. Its natural habitat is subtropical or tropical moist montane forests. It is found in terrestrial environments.

== Conservation ==
Centropogon rubiginosus is threatened by habitat loss. This species is recorded to be an endangered species. The species is plentiful in the area that it grows in, but it is being threatened by fires that are man-made and the agriculture modernization.
