= Centropogon aequatorialis =

Conservation status
- Endangered (IUCN 3.1)

Scientific classification
- Kingdom: Plantae
- Clade: Tracheophytes
- Clade: Angiosperms
- Clade: Eudicots
- Clade: Asterids
- Order: Asterales
- Family: Campanulaceae
- Genus: Centropogon
- Species: C. aequatorialis

Binomial name
- Centropogon aequatorialis E.Wimm.

Species of flowering plant

Centropogon aequatorialis is a species of plant in the family Campanulaceae. It is a scrambling subshrub native to western Colombia and Ecuador. It grows in Andean moist montane forests from 1,500 to 2,500 meters elevation.
