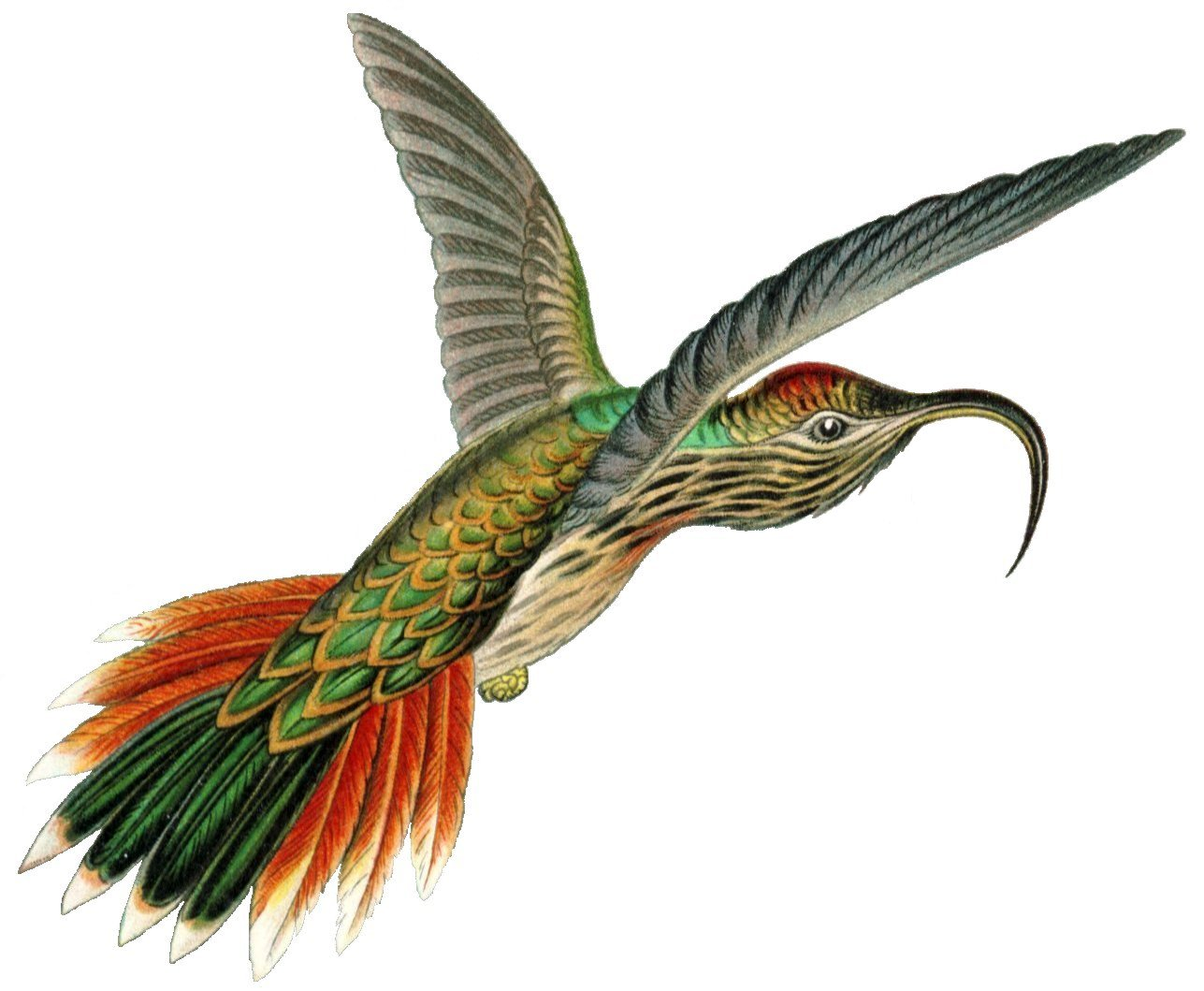
- Buff-tailed sicklebill, Eutoxeres condamini

Scientific classification
- Kingdom: Animalia
- Phylum: Chordata
- Class: Aves
- Order: Apodiformes
- Family: Trochilidae
- Subfamily: Phaethornithinae
- Genus: Eutoxeres; Reichenbach, 1849

Type species
- Trochilus aquila Bourcier, 1847

Species
- 2, see text

= Eutoxeres =

Genus of birds

Eutoxeres is a genus of hummingbird in the family Trochilidae.

== Species ==
The genus contains the following species:

Genus Eutoxeres – Reichenbach, 1849 – two species
Common name	Scientific name and subspecies	Range	Size and ecology	IUCN status and estimated population
White-tipped sicklebill	Eutoxeres aquila (Bourcier, 1847) Three subspecies: E. a. aquila; E. a. salvini; E. a. heterurus	Costa Rica, Panama, Colombia, Ecuador, and far northern Peru	Size: Habitat: Diet:	LC
Buff-tailed sicklebill	Eutoxeres condamini (Bourcier, 1851) Two subspecies: Eutoxeres condamini condamini (Bourcier, 1851) – northern buff-tailed sicklebill; Eutoxeres condamini gracilis Berlepsch & Stolzmann, 1902 – southern buff-tailed sicklebill	southern Colombia and northern Ecuador to Peru and Bolivia	Size: Habitat: Diet:	LC
