= Centropogon hirtiflorus =

Conservation status
- Endangered (IUCN 3.1)

Scientific classification
- Kingdom: Plantae
- Clade: Tracheophytes
- Clade: Angiosperms
- Clade: Eudicots
- Clade: Asterids
- Order: Asterales
- Family: Campanulaceae
- Genus: Centropogon
- Species: C. hirtiflorus

Binomial name
- Centropogon hirtiflorus Drake

Species of flowering plant

Centropogon hirtiflorus is a species of plant in the family Campanulaceae.

== Information ==
It is a plant unique to Ecuador. Its natural habitat is subtropical or tropical moist montane forests. This species can be found in terrestrial systems. It is recorded that this species is endangered, but the threats that affected the population of the species is unknown. The habitat is occupied in the areas of low and high Andean forests.
