= Centropogon sodiroanus =

Conservation status
- Near Threatened (IUCN 3.1)

Scientific classification
- Kingdom: Plantae
- Clade: Tracheophytes
- Clade: Angiosperms
- Clade: Eudicots
- Clade: Asterids
- Order: Asterales
- Family: Campanulaceae
- Genus: Centropogon
- Species: C. sodiroanus

Binomial name
- Centropogon sodiroanus Zahlbr.

Species of flowering plant

Centropogon sodiroanus is a species of plant in the family Campanulaceae.

== Ecology ==
It is endemic to Ecuador where it is known by twelve subpopulations. It has three isolated subpopulations occur in Carchi, El Oro and Morona-Santiago. Its natural habitat is subtropical or tropical moist montane forests. It is threatened by habitat loss.
