= Centropogon balslevii =

Conservation status
- Endangered (IUCN 3.1)

Scientific classification
- Kingdom: Plantae
- Clade: Tracheophytes
- Clade: Angiosperms
- Clade: Eudicots
- Clade: Asterids
- Order: Asterales
- Family: Campanulaceae
- Genus: Centropogon
- Species: C. balslevii

Binomial name
- Centropogon balslevii Jeppesen

Species of flowering plant

Centropogon balslevii is a species of plant in the family Campanulaceae. It is endemic to Ecuador. Its natural habitat is subtropical or tropical moist montane forests. It is threatened by habitat loss.
