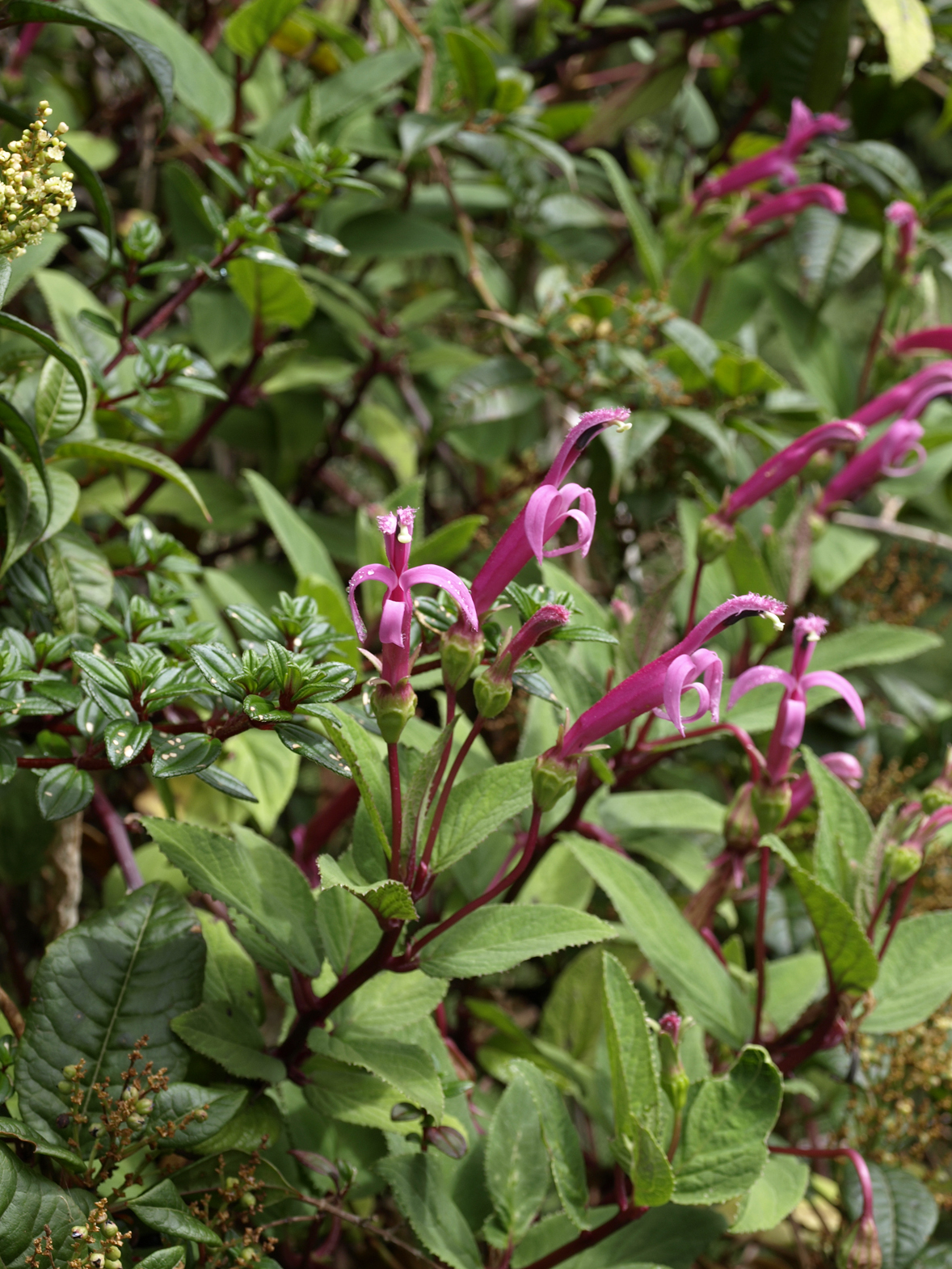
- Centropogon gutierrezii

Scientific classification
- Kingdom: Plantae
- Clade: Tracheophytes
- Clade: Angiosperms
- Clade: Eudicots
- Clade: Asterids
- Order: Asterales
- Family: Campanulaceae
- Subfamily: Lobelioideae
- Genus: Centropogon; C.Presl

Species
- Many, see text

= Centropogon =

Genus of flowering plants

Centropogon is a plant genus in the family Campanulaceae. It includes 212 species native to the tropical Americas, ranging from central Mexico to Bolivia and southeastern Brazil. In systems where the Lobeliaceae are recognized as distinct, Centropogon is placed there.

== Species ==
212 species are accepted.

- Centropogon acrodentatus E.Wimm.
- Centropogon aequatorialis E.Wimm.
- Centropogon alatus Gleason
- Centropogon albertinus E.Wimm.
- Centropogon albolimbatus E.Wimm.
- Centropogon albostellatus Jeppesen
- Centropogon alens E.Wimm.
- Centropogon alsophilus E.Wimm.
- Centropogon altus E.Wimm.
- Centropogon amplicorollinus (E.Wimm.) B.A.Stein
- Centropogon aquilinus E.Wimm.
- Centropogon arachnocalyx Lammers
- Centropogon arcuatus E.Wimm.
- Centropogon argutus E.Wimm.
- Centropogon asclepiadeus (Willd. ex Schult.) E.Wimm.
- Centropogon astrotrichus E.Wimm.
- Centropogon aurostellatus E.Wimm.
- Centropogon australis (E.Wimm.) Gleason
- Centropogon ayavacensis (Willd. ex Schult.) Lammers
- Centropogon azuayensis Jeppesen
- Centropogon baezanus Jeppesen
- Centropogon balslevii Jeppesen
- Centropogon bangii Zahlbr.
- Centropogon belliflorus E.Wimm.
- Centropogon beniteziae Lammers
- Centropogon berteroanus (Spreng.) DC.
- Centropogon beslerioides (Kunth) DC.
- Centropogon brachysiphoniatus Zahlbr.
- Centropogon brittonianus Zahlbr.
- Centropogon bruneotomentosus E.Wimm.
- Centropogon burmeisteroides McVaugh
- Centropogon calycinus Benth.
- Centropogon candidatus Lammers
- Centropogon caoutchouc (Kunth) Gleason
- Centropogon capitatus Drake
- Centropogon carnosus Zahlbr.
- Centropogon carolinae F.Wimm.
- Centropogon carupanensis J.R.Grande & W.Meier
- Centropogon cazaletii Jeppesen
- Centropogon chiltasonensis Jeppesen
- Centropogon chontalensis Jeppesen
- Centropogon cinnabarinus E.Wimm.
- Centropogon coccineus (Hook.) Regel ex B.D.Jacks.
- Centropogon comosus Gleason
- Centropogon congestus Gleason
- Centropogon connatilobatus Lammers
- Centropogon cordifolius Benth.
- Centropogon cornutus (L.) Druce
- Centropogon costaricae (Vatke) McVaugh
- Centropogon cupreus E.Wimm.
- Centropogon curvatus Gleason
- Centropogon darienensis Wilbur
- Centropogon david-smithii Lammers
- Centropogon delicatulus McVaugh
- Centropogon densiflorus Benth.
- Centropogon dianae Lammers
- Centropogon dillonii Lammers
- Centropogon dissectus E.Wimm.
- Centropogon dombeyanus (C.Presl) E.Wimm.
- Centropogon eborinus E.Wimm.
- Centropogon eilersii Lammers & M.O.Dillon
- Centropogon ellipticus Gleason
- Centropogon elmanus E.Wimm.
- Centropogon erianthus (Benth.) Benth. & Hook.f. ex Drake
- Centropogon erythraeus Drake
- Centropogon eurystomus E.Wimm.
- Centropogon ewanii E.Wimm.
- Centropogon exsertus Lammers
- Centropogon featherstonei Gleason
- Centropogon ferrugineus (L.f.) Gleason
- Centropogon fimbriatulus McVaugh
- Centropogon floccosus Planch.
- Centropogon floricomus McVaugh
- Centropogon flos-mutisii E.Wimm.
- Centropogon foetidus (Willd. ex Kunth) E.Wimm.
- Centropogon foliosus Rusby
- Centropogon fulvus Gleason
- Centropogon fuscus (G.Don) E.Wimm.
- Centropogon gamosepalus Zahlbr.
- Centropogon gesneriformis Drake
- Centropogon glabrifilis (E.Wimm.) Jeppesen
- Centropogon glandulosus (Hook.) Decne.
- Centropogon glaucotomentosus E.Wimm.
- Centropogon gleasonii (E.Wimm.) E.Wimm.
- Centropogon gloriosus (Britton) Zahlbr.
- Centropogon grandidentatus (Schltdl.) Zahlbr.
- Centropogon grandis (L.f.) C.Presl
- Centropogon granulosus C.Presl
- Centropogon gutierrezii (Planch. & Oerst.) E.Wimm.
- Centropogon hartwegii McVaugh
- Centropogon hazenii (Gleason) E.Wimm.
- Centropogon herzogii Zahlbr. & Rech.
- Centropogon heteropilis E.Wimm.
- Centropogon hirsutus Gleason
- Centropogon hirtiflorus Drake
- Centropogon hirtus (G.Don) C.Presl
- Centropogon hyalinus McVaugh
- Centropogon hylephilus E.Wimm.
- Centropogon hypotrichus E.Wimm.
- Centropogon incanus (Britton) Zahlbr.
- Centropogon intonsus Gleason
- Centropogon isabellinus E.Wimm.
- Centropogon jeppesenii Lammers
- Centropogon joergensenii Lammers
- Centropogon karstenii Zahlbr.
- Centropogon knoxii Lammers
- Centropogon lagotis E.Wimm.
- Centropogon lanceolatus E.Wimm.
- Centropogon latifolius F.Wimm.
- Centropogon latisepalus Gleason
- Centropogon laxus Zahlbr.
- Centropogon lehmannii Zahlbr.
- Centropogon leucocarpus McVaugh
- Centropogon leucophyllus Gleason
- Centropogon lianeus E.Wimm.
- Centropogon licayensis Gleason
- Centropogon lindenianus E.Wimm.
- Centropogon linneanus E.Wimm.
- Centropogon llanganatensis Jeppesen
- Centropogon longifolius E.Wimm.
- Centropogon longipetiolatus E.Wimm.
- Centropogon loretensis E.Wimm.
- Centropogon luteus E.Wimm.
- Centropogon luteynii Wilbur
- Centropogon macbridei Gleason
- Centropogon macrocarpus Zahlbr.
- Centropogon macrophyllus (G.Don) E.Wimm.
- Centropogon magnificus Zahlbr. & Rech.
- Centropogon mandonis Zahlbr.
- Centropogon medusa E.Wimm.
- Centropogon mellitus E.Wimm.
- Centropogon microcalyx E.Wimm.
- Centropogon monagensis McVaugh
- Centropogon nervosus E.Wimm. ex Gleason
- Centropogon nigricans Zahlbr.
- Centropogon occultus Gleason
- Centropogon oligotrichus E.Wimm.
- Centropogon ozotrichus E.Wimm.
- Centropogon palmanus (Donn.Sm.) E.Wimm.
- Centropogon pamplonensis E.Wimm.
- Centropogon papillosus E.Wimm.
- Centropogon parviflorus (Zahlbr.) Jeppesen
- Centropogon pataensis J.R.Grande & W.Meier
- Centropogon perlongus Gleason
- Centropogon peruvianus (E.Wimm.) McVaugh
- Centropogon phoeniceus Jeppesen
- Centropogon pichinchensis Zahlbr.
- Centropogon pilalensis Jeppesen
- Centropogon pinguis E.Wimm.
- Centropogon polytrichus E.Wimm.
- Centropogon preslii E.Wimm.
- Centropogon pulcher Zahlbr.
- Centropogon pyropus E.Wimm.
- Centropogon quebradanus E.Wimm.
- Centropogon reflexus C.Presl
- Centropogon reticulatus Drake
- Centropogon rimbachii E.Wimm.
- Centropogon roraimanus E.Wimm.
- Centropogon roseus Rusby
- Centropogon rubiginosus E.Wimm.
- Centropogon rubroaureus E.Wimm.
- Centropogon rubrodentatus Jeppesen
- Centropogon rufus E.Wimm.
- Centropogon saltuum E.Wimm.
- Centropogon salviiformis Zahlbr.
- Centropogon scabellus E.Wimm.
- Centropogon scabiosus E.Wimm.
- Centropogon sciaphilus Zahlbr.
- Centropogon silvaticus E.Wimm.
- Centropogon simulans Lammers
- Centropogon smithii E.Wimm.
- Centropogon sodiroanus Zahlbr.
- Centropogon solanifolius Benth
- Centropogon solisii Jeppesen
- Centropogon steinii Lammers
- Centropogon steyermarkii Jeppesen
- Centropogon subandinus Zahlbr.
- Centropogon subcordatus Zahlbr.
- Centropogon suberianthus Zahlbr.
- Centropogon talamancensis Wilbur
- Centropogon tenuifolius E.Wimm.
- Centropogon tessmannii E.Wimm.
- Centropogon tortilis E.Wimm.
- Centropogon tovarensis Planch. & Linden
- Centropogon trachyanthus E.Wimm.
- Centropogon trianae Zahlbr.
- Centropogon trichodes E.Wimm.
- Centropogon ulloae Lammers
- Centropogon umbrosus E.Wimm.
- Centropogon uncialis McVaugh
- Centropogon uncinatus Zahlbr.
- Centropogon unduavensis (Britton) Zahlbr.
- Centropogon unicolor E.Wimm.
- Centropogon urceolatus E.Wimm.
- Centropogon ursinus Jeppesen
- Centropogon urubambae E.Wimm.
- Centropogon valerii Standl.
- Centropogon varelae E.Wimm.
- Centropogon varicus McVaugh
- Centropogon vaughianus E.Wimm.
- Centropogon verbascifolius (C.Presl) Gleason
- Centropogon vernicosus Zahlbr.
- Centropogon viriduliflorus E.Wimm.
- Centropogon vitifolius Lammers
- Centropogon vittariifolius McVaugh
- Centropogon vulpinus E.Wimm.
- Centropogon warscewiczii Van Houtte ex Regel
- Centropogon weberbaueri Zahlbr.
- Centropogon wilburii Lammers
- Centropogon yarumalensis E.Wimm.
- Centropogon yungasensis Britton
- Centropogon zamorensis Jeppesen
