= Ursinus =

Ursinus may refer to:

== Mononym ==
- Ursinus of Bourges (fl. 3rd or 4th century), Catholic saint, first bishop of Bourges
- Antipope Ursicinus (died c. 381)
- Ursinus (bishop) (fl. c. 560 and/or 6th-7th centuries), bishop of (Windisch)-Konstanz
- Ursinus the Abbot (fl. 7th century), presumed biographer of Saint Leodegar

== Surname ==
- Benjamin Ursinus von Bär (1646–1720), Court Preacher to the Elector of Brandenburg
- Johannes Heinrich Ursinus (1608–1667), German Lutheran theologian
- Michael Ursinus (born 1950), German scholar of Islam
- Oskar Ursinus (1877–1952), German aviation pioneer
- Sophie Ursinus (1760–1836), German serial killer
- Zacharias Ursinus (1534–1583), German theologian

== Other uses ==
- Ursinus College, Collegeville, Pennsylvania, U.S.
