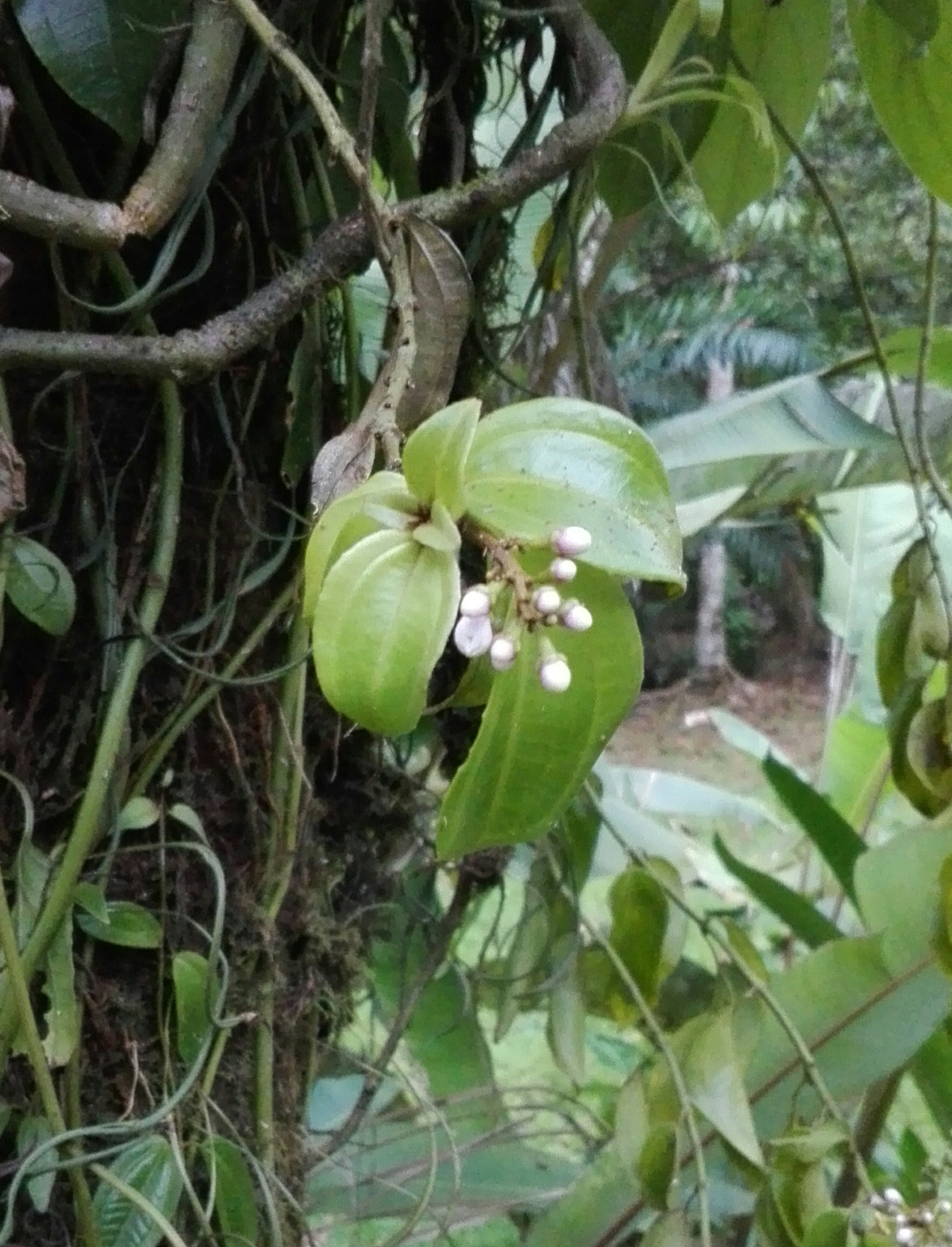
- Adelobotrys sp.

Scientific classification
- Kingdom: Plantae
- Clade: Tracheophytes
- Clade: Angiosperms
- Clade: Eudicots
- Clade: Rosids
- Order: Myrtales
- Family: Melastomataceae
- Genus: Adelobotrys; DC.

= Adelobotrys =

Genus of flowering plants

Adelobotrys is a genus of plants in the family Melastomataceae. It contains the following species (but this list may be incomplete):

- Adelobotrys panamensis, Almeda
