= Adelobotrys panamensis =

Conservation status
- Critically Endangered (IUCN 2.3)

Scientific classification
- Kingdom: Plantae
- Clade: Tracheophytes
- Clade: Angiosperms
- Clade: Eudicots
- Clade: Rosids
- Order: Myrtales
- Family: Melastomataceae
- Genus: Adelobotrys
- Species: A. panamensis

Binomial name
- Adelobotrys panamensis Almeda

Species of flowering plant

Adelobotrys panamensis is a species of plant in the family Melastomataceae. It is endemic to the mountains of El Copé in the Coclé province of Panama. It is threatened by habitat loss.
