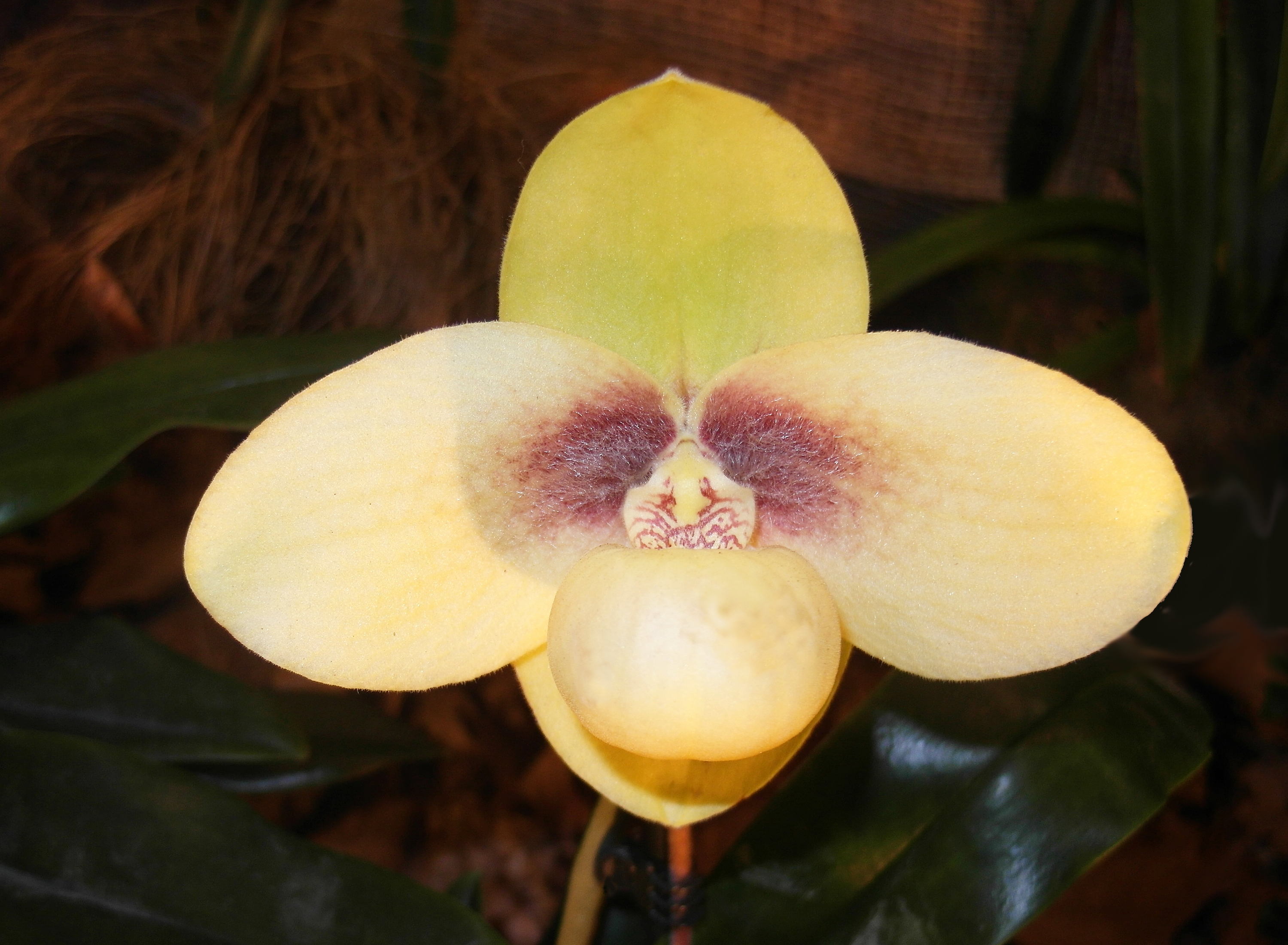

Scientific classification
- Kingdom: Plantae
- Clade: Tracheophytes
- Clade: Angiosperms
- Clade: Monocots
- Order: Asparagales
- Family: Orchidaceae
- Subfamily: Cypripedioideae
- Genus: Paphiopedilum
- Species: P. hangianum

Binomial name
- Paphiopedilum hangianum Perner & Gruss

= Paphiopedilum hangianum =

Species of orchid

Paphiopedilum hangianum is a species of slipper orchid in the family Orchidaceae, endemic to northern Vietnam and China. Due to overcollection and habitat loss, the species is considered endangered and is listed under international conservation agreements.

== Taxonomy ==
Paphiopedilum hangianum was formally described by Holger Perner and Olaf Gruss after receiving specimens in 1999, naming it after Tong Ngoc Hang, a Vietnamese orchid grower, who sent it to them.

It belongs to the genus Paphiopedilum, commonly known as lady's slipper orchids, which are characterized by their pouch-like labellum and terrestrial or lithophytic growth habit. The species is closely related to Paphiopedilum emersonii, from which it can be distinguished by flower morphology.

== Description ==
Paphiopedilum hangianum is a terrestrial orchid species characterized by 4 to 7 distichous, coriaceous leaves that are ligulate, obtuse or subacute, and measure 12-30 cm in length and 3-5 cm in width. The upper surface of the leaves is glossy green, while the underside is a paler green with a pronounced keel. This species blooms in spring, producing a single (rarely two) flowered, erect, terminal inflorescence 6-12 cm long. The inflorescence is bearing a floral bract that is ovate, obtuse, conduplicate, and shorter than the ovary. The flower is large, slightly sweet-smelling, pale yellow to pale yellow-green in color, and measures 9-12 cm in width and 6-8 cm in height.

This species has the largest flowers in its genus.

== Distribution and habitat ==
Paphiopedilum hangianum is native to South-Central China and Vietnam, where it grows at elevations between 450 and 750 meters. It inhabits evergreen, closed forests on very steep slopes or cliffs of highly eroded limestone mountains. The species typically grows in calcareous, thin soils under moderate shade. In its natural habitat, mean temperatures range from 12 to 26 °C, with peak flowering occurring between April and May.

== Conservation status ==
Wild populations of Paphiopedilum hangianum are under threat of extinction due to over-collection and the ongoing loss of suitable habitats. The species is listed in Appendix I of the Convention on International Trade in Endangered Species of Wild Fauna and Flora (CITES), which prohibits international trade of wild-collected specimens. Conservation efforts have explored the use of asymbiotic germination and tissue culture as effective methods for propagation and ex situ conservation, as well as to reduce pressure on wild populations through commercial cultivation.
