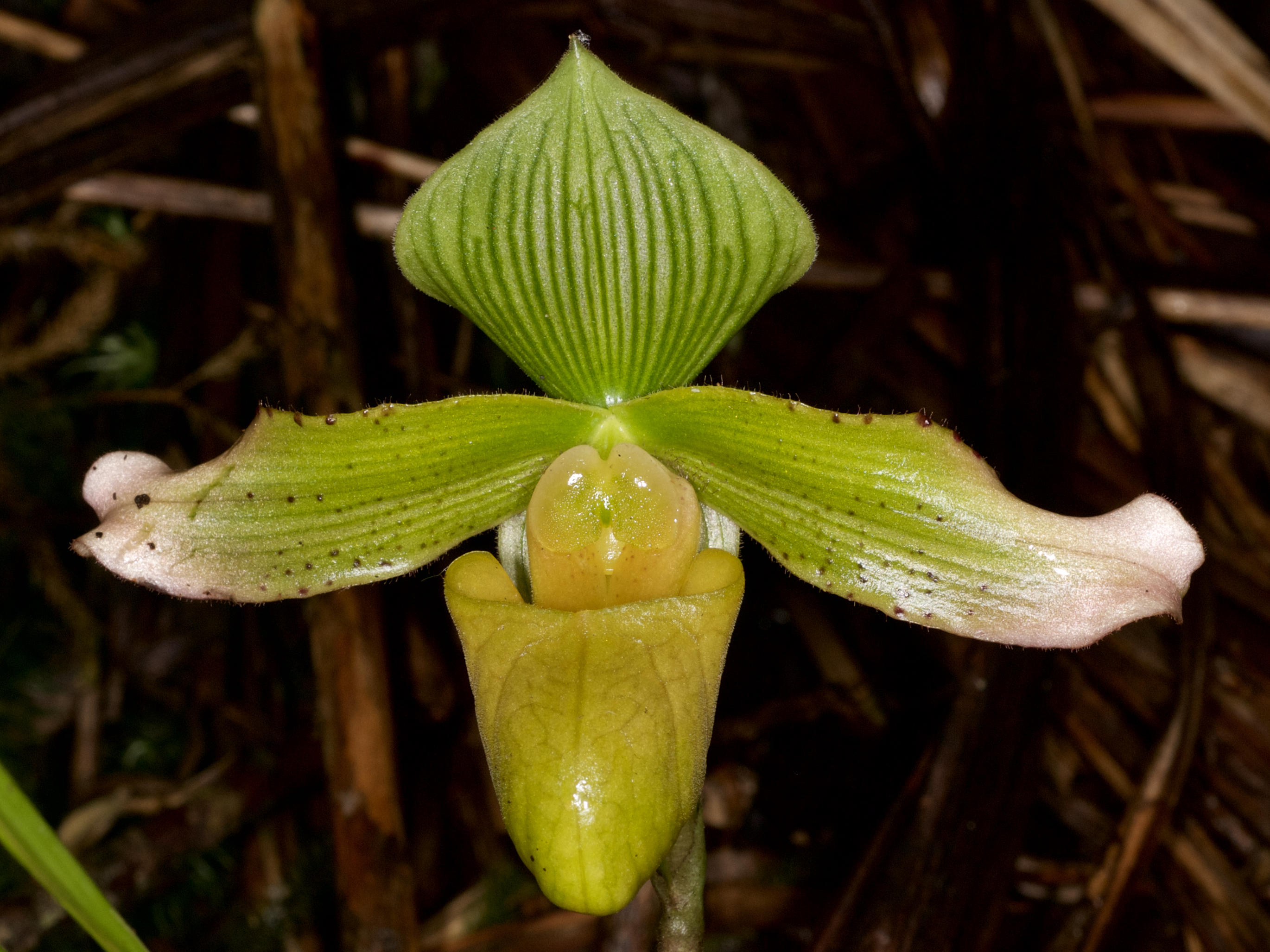
- Paphiopedilum javanicum var. virens in Mt. Kinabalu National Park, Sabah, Borneo, Malaysia

Conservation status
- Endangered (IUCN 3.1)

Scientific classification
- Kingdom: Plantae
- Clade: Tracheophytes
- Clade: Angiosperms
- Clade: Monocots
- Order: Asparagales
- Family: Orchidaceae
- Subfamily: Cypripedioideae
- Genus: Paphiopedilum
- Species: P. javanicum

Binomial name
- Paphiopedilum javanicum (Reinw. ex Lindl.) Pfitzer, Jahrb.

Synonyms
- Cordula javanica (Reinw. ex Lindl.) Rolfe; Cordula virens (Rchb.f.) Rolfe; Cypripedium virens Rchb.f.; Paphiopedilum javanicum f. nymphenburgianum (Roeth & O.Gruss) P.J. Cribb; Paphiopedilum javanicum var. nymphenburgianum Roeth & O.Gruss; Paphiopedilum purpurascens Fowlie; Paphiopedilum virens (Rchb.f.) Pfitz

= Paphiopedilum javanicum =

Species of orchid

Paphiopedilum javanicum, commonly known as the Java paphiopedilum, is a species of orchid from southeast Asia, specifically in Java, Bali, Flores and Sumatra. Its population is decreasing due to a number of threats, causing the IUCN to list it as an endangered species. It lives on mountains 750–2,100 m (2,460–6,890 ft) above sea level.
