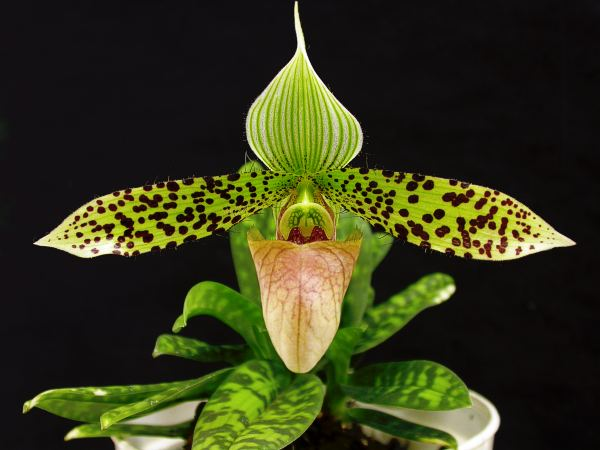

Conservation status
- Critically Endangered (IUCN 3.1)

Scientific classification
- Kingdom: Plantae
- Clade: Tracheophytes
- Clade: Angiosperms
- Clade: Monocots
- Order: Asparagales
- Family: Orchidaceae
- Subfamily: Cypripedioideae
- Genus: Paphiopedilum
- Species: P. sukhakulii

Binomial name
- Paphiopedilum sukhakulii Schoser & Senghas

Synonyms
- Paphiopedilum sukhakulii f. aureum Van Delden ex O.Gruss

= Paphiopedilum sukhakulii =

Species of orchid

Paphiopedilum sukhakulii is a species of plant in the family Orchidaceae.

== Description ==
Paphiopedilum sukhakulii, a perennial rosulate herb, is small in size, narrowly shaped, pale, and dark green. The outer side of its leaf is light and dark green, and the inner side is gray-green with red dots. The leaves usually reach up to 30 cm (12 in) height and 5 cm (2.0 in) in width. P. sukhakulii flowers are up to 14 cm (5.5 in) in diameter, purple-brown and white-haired, with a single flowered inflorescence and a green ovate floral bract that is 1/3 the length of the ovary. The broad oval upper sepal is white with a pink base that usually is 10–13 cm (3.9–5.1 in) long and 2–6 cm (0.79–2.36 in) short. It has longitudinal green lines that stretch across the leaf without touching the edges, leaving a narrow white border. The lower sepals look like the upper ones, but much smaller, white and purple, with purple and green lines. The oval-lanceolate petals are arranged horizontally and slightly bent forward. The edges of the petals are slightly wavy and are covered with hairs that are dense and long. These petals are shiny and bright green with darker longitudinal veins and brown-red dots.

== Range description ==
True endemic species are often rare, tending to be confined to specific areas. P. sukhakulii is one of these rare species with a very restricted distribution at one small location. P. Sukhakulii is a species of orchid endemic to northeastern Thailand. It grows at heights of 240–1,000 metres (790–3,280 ft) on Mount Phy Luang Mountains in the province of Loei. This orchid grows in leafy sand-clay linens, usually along mountain streams under the shade of large forest trees. Flowering occurs during the warm months of the year.

Paphiopedilum sukhakulii is a species of the hill evergreen forest and is very sensitive to the environment. It must be grown near rocky high altitude, particular nutrient availability, and shaded habitats.

== Population ==
The population is slowly decreasing and is currently under the category of critically endangered. P. sukhakulii has been significantly reduced during recent decades due to many threats.

There is a continuing decline in the number of P. sukhakulii and the quality of the habitats in the single location. The estimated number of P. sukhakulii is less than 50 and they all occur in a single subpopulation. The population has declined by 95% over the last decade. This decline is continuing rapidly and the population is projected to decline by 95-99% in the next three generations.

== Use and trade ==
Paphiopedilum sukhakulii is among the most heavily traded ornamental plants in Thailand. P. sukhakulii is collected for commercial use for horticulture, domestic and international trade.

== Major threats ==
This species is under numerous threats including habitat fragmentation and degradation through the deterioration of the surrounding environments, deforestation, logging, random cutting, ruthless collection for regional and international trade, trampling, recreation and ecological disturbance.

== Conservation actions ==
According to the IUCN Red list, there are many actions that can be done in order to protect P. sukhakulii. One action that can be done would be protecting the habitat, from collection, trampling, and deforestation. Other actions would be to raise public awareness, initiate long term community based conservation, estimate the population size, and protect the living individuals of the species through legislation and legal protection, which would then ban the species from being chosen or dug up.
