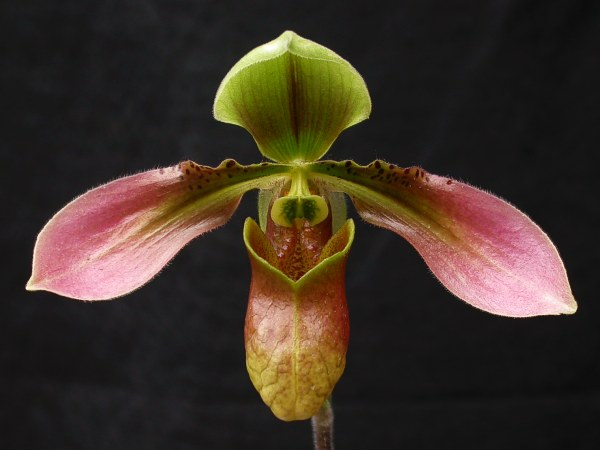
- Flower of Paphiopedilum appletonianum

Scientific classification
- Kingdom: Plantae
- Clade: Embryophytes
- Clade: Tracheophytes
- Clade: Angiosperms
- Clade: Monocots
- Order: Asparagales
- Family: Orchidaceae
- Subfamily: Cypripedioideae
- Genus: Paphiopedilum
- Species: P. appletonianum

Binomial name
- Paphiopedilum appletonianum (Gower) Rolfe

= Paphiopedilum appletonianum =

Species of orchid

Paphiopedilum appletonianum is a species of slipper orchid occurring from Hainan Island to Indochina.

== Taxonomy ==
The slipper orchid is named after W. M. Appleton, who was the first to cultivate the species in Europe.

=== Synonyms ===
Cypripedium appletonianum Gower is the basionym. Other synonyms include:

- Cypripedium wolterianum Kraenzl.
- Paphiopedilum wolterianum (Kraenzl.) Pfitzer
- Cordula appletoniana (Gower) Rolfe
- Paphiopedilum hookerae ssp. appletonianum (Gower) M.W.Wood
- Paphiopedilum hainanense Fowlie
- Paphiopedilum appletonianum var. immaculatum Braem
- Paphiopedilum robinsonii f. viride Braem
- Paphiopedilum appletonianum f. immaculatum (Braem) Braem
- Paphiopedilum appletonianum var. hainanense (Fowlie) Braem
- Paphiopedilum cerveranum Braem
- Paphiopedilum cerveranum f. viride (Braem) Braem
- Paphiopedilum appletonianum f. album Asher ex O.Gruss
- Paphiopedilum tridentatum S.C.Chen & Z.J.Liu
- Paphiopedilum angustifolium R.F.Guo & Z.J.Liu
- Paphiopedilum puberulum S.P.Lei & J.Yong Zhang

== Description ==
P. appletonianum is a small to medium-sized slipper orchid that grows in humus or leaf litter, and sometimes in mossy trees or boulders. It has 6 to 8 narrowly elliptic to oblong elliptic leaves measuring 10–25 centimetres (3.9–9.8 in) long and 2–5 centimetres (0.79–1.97 in) wide, with its upper surface being green with obscure dark green mottling, and its lower surface is keeled with purple marks at the base. The purple, shortly pubescent inflorescence, measuring 15–50 centimetres (5.9–19.7 in), consists of a single terminal, erect flower (or 2 in rare cases) with a width of 6–10 centimetres (2.4–3.9 in), having an extremely variable staminode. Peak flowering occurs in March until May.

Two natural variants are available, the Hainan variant, P. appletonianum var. hainanense, and an albino form, Paphiopedilum appletonianum fma. album. The Hainan variant has some slightly different features from its Indochina counterpart, including a brightly coloured bloom, and its boldly mottled leaves, with some taxonomists define it as a separate species altogether.

== Distribution ==
P. appletonianum is distributed in Hainan and throughout eastern Indochina, where it grows in wet forests within steep granite slopes, and also damp river canyons near waterfalls, at elevations of 700–2,000 metres (2,300–6,600 ft) with a mean temperature of 8–19 °C (46–66 °F).
