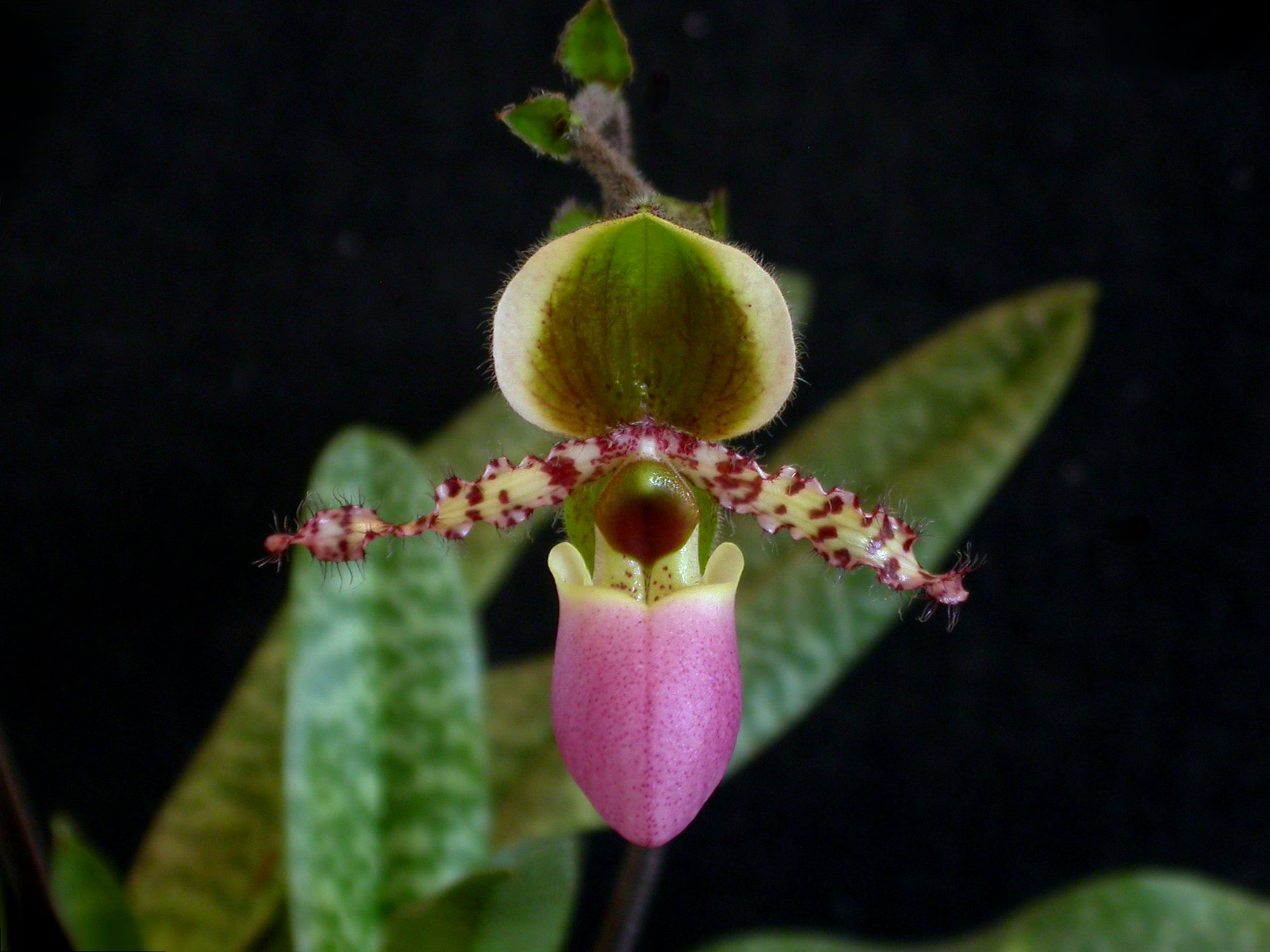
- Flower of Paphiopedilum liemianum

Scientific classification
- Kingdom: Plantae
- Clade: Tracheophytes
- Clade: Angiosperms
- Clade: Monocots
- Order: Asparagales
- Family: Orchidaceae
- Subfamily: Cypripedioideae
- Genus: Paphiopedilum
- Species: P. liemianum

Binomial name
- Paphiopedilum liemianum (Fowlie) K.Karas. & K.Saito

Synonyms
- Paphiopedilum chamberlainianum ssp. liemianum Fowlie (basionym); Paphiopedilum victoria-regina ssp. liemianum (Fowlie) M.W.Wood; Paphiopedilum chamberlainianum var. liemianum (Fowlie) Braem

= Paphiopedilum liemianum =

Species of orchid

Paphiopedilum liemianum is a species of orchid endemic to northern Sumatra (Kg. Susuk). These plants were first collected in Gunung Sinabung in Sumatra by Liem Khe Wie, at 600–1,000 meters. The flowers are 8–9 cm across and sit on top of a 15–20 cm long inflorescence.
