= Paphiopedilum tigrinum =

Conservation status
- Endangered (IUCN 3.1)

Scientific classification
- Kingdom: Plantae
- Clade: Tracheophytes
- Clade: Angiosperms
- Clade: Monocots
- Order: Asparagales
- Family: Orchidaceae
- Subfamily: Cypripedioideae
- Genus: Paphiopedilum
- Species: P. tigrinum

Binomial name
- Paphiopedilum tigrinum Koop. & N.Haseg.

Synonyms
- Paphiopedilum markianum Fowlie; Paphiopedilum markianum f. smaragdinum (Z.J.Liu & S.C.Chen) Braem; Paphiopedilum smaragdinum Z.J.Liu & S.C.Chen; Paphiopedilum tigrinum var. smaragdinum (Z.J.Liu & S.C.Chen) Z.J.Liu & S.C.Chen; Paphiopedilum tigrinum f. smaragdinum (Z.J.Liu & S.C.Chen) O.Gruss

Species of orchid

Paphiopedilum tigrinum is a species of flowering plant in the family Orchidaceae. It is native to eastern and western Yunnan province in China and to northeastern Myanmar. It is a terrestrial, epiphytic, or lithophytic perennial orchid which flowers from May to August. Its native habitat is moist montane forests from 1,200 to 2,500 meters elevation. It grows in moist well-drained and humus-rich soils, on mossy limestone cliffs, and on trees. It grows in moderate shade, often under trees or at thicket margins.

It is a rare species with few restricted and localized populations. It is threatened by habitat loss from deforestation and fire, and from over-collecting. The IUCN Red List assesses the species as Endangered.
