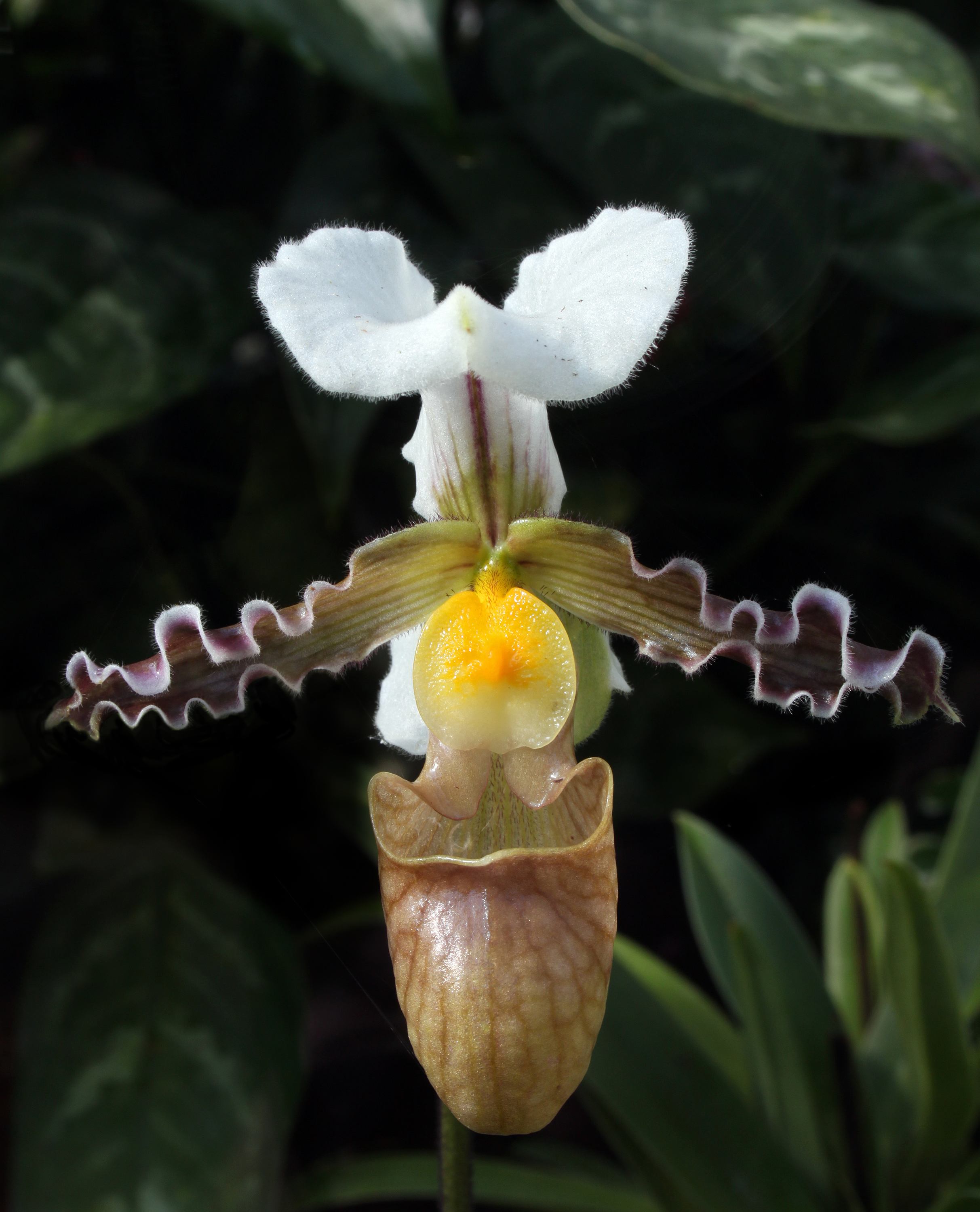
- Flower of Paphiopedilum tranlienianum

Scientific classification
- Kingdom: Plantae
- Clade: Tracheophytes
- Clade: Angiosperms
- Clade: Monocots
- Order: Asparagales
- Family: Orchidaceae
- Subfamily: Cypripedioideae
- Genus: Paphiopedilum
- Species: P. tranlienianum

Binomial name
- Paphiopedilum tranlienianum O.Gruss. & Perner

Synonyms
- Paphiopedilum caobangense N.T.Tich; Paphiopedilum tranlienianum f. alboviride O.Gruss

= Paphiopedilum tranlienianum =

Species of orchid

Paphiopedilum tranlienianum is a species of orchid endemic to Cao Bằng.
