= Paphiopedilum papilio-laoticus =

Scientific classification
- Kingdom: Plantae
- Clade: Tracheophytes
- Clade: Angiosperms
- Clade: Monocots
- Order: Asparagales
- Family: Orchidaceae
- Subfamily: Cypripedioideae
- Genus: Paphiopedilum
- Species: P. papilio-laoticus

Binomial name
- Paphiopedilum papilio-laoticus Schuit., Luang Aphay & Iio

Species of orchid

Paphiopedilum papilio-laoticus is a species of flowering plant that is part of the subfamily Cypripedioideae. This plant was found in Laos by Sulivong Luangaphay. It is expected to be assessed as a critically endangered species, but scientists are still searching for more specimens in the inaccessible parts of Laos.

Vientiane Times wrote in their Unicorn, “This showy and undoubtedly very rare species will hopefully be propagated from seed soon, and we urge orchid amateurs not to buy any plants of this species that could be wild-collected. In a few years’ time it should become widely available as legally propagated plants do not pose a threat to their continued existence in the wild.”
