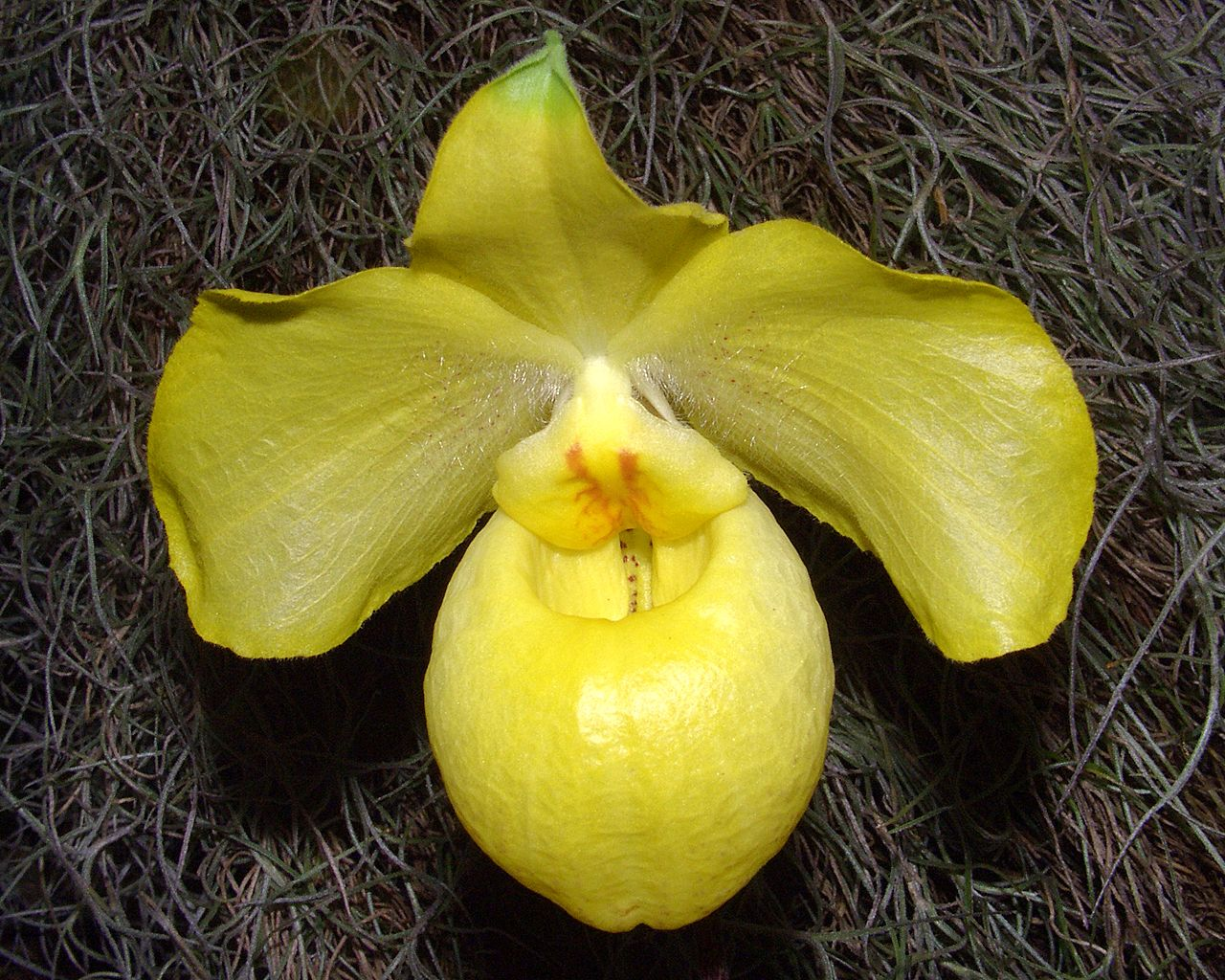

Conservation status
- Endangered (IUCN 3.1)

Scientific classification
- Kingdom: Plantae
- Clade: Tracheophytes
- Clade: Angiosperms
- Clade: Monocots
- Order: Asparagales
- Family: Orchidaceae
- Subfamily: Cypripedioideae
- Genus: Paphiopedilum
- Species: P. armeniacum

Binomial name
- Paphiopedilum armeniacum S.C.Chen & F.Y.Liu

Synonyms
- Paphiopedilum armeniacum var. mark-fun Fowlie; Paphiopedilum armeniacum var. markii O.Gruss; Paphiopedilum armeniacum f. markii (O.Gruss) Braem; Paphiopedilum armeniacum var. parviflorum Z.J.Liu & J. Yong Zhang; Paphiopedilum armeniacum var. undulatum Z.J.Liu & J. Yong Zhang

= Paphiopedilum armeniacum =

Species of orchid

Paphiopedilum armeniacum is a species of flowering plant in the orchid family, Orchidaceae. It is known commonly as the apricot orange paphiopedilum and golden slipper orchid. It is endemic to China, where it occurs only in Yunnan. It is also cultivated and has won prestigious awards at flower shows.

This plant grows in soil or on rocks, spreading via creeping stolons. It produces 5 to 7 leathery purple-spotted green leaves each up to 12 centimeters long. There is usually one flower atop the hairy, purple-green scape, but occasionally a second flower is produced. The flower is up to 9 centimeters wide. It is yellow in color, streaked and spotted with maroon.

In the wild this species grows on limestone substrates in rocky, brushy habitat. Its range is mainly limited to the Nu Jiang River Valley. The population is fragmented and the species is in decline due to habitat destruction. The valuable plant is also poached for use in the horticultural trade.
