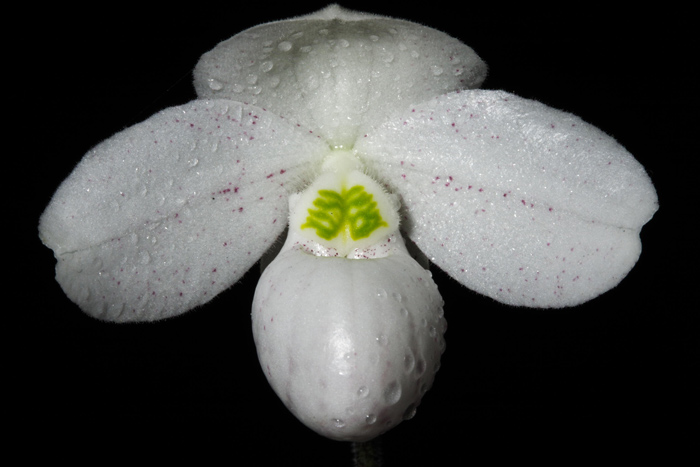
- Flower of Paphiopedilum thaianum

Conservation status
- Critically Endangered (IUCN 3.1)

Scientific classification
- Kingdom: Plantae
- Clade: Tracheophytes
- Clade: Angiosperms
- Clade: Monocots
- Order: Asparagales
- Family: Orchidaceae
- Subfamily: Cypripedioideae
- Genus: Paphiopedilum
- Species: P. thaianum

Binomial name
- Paphiopedilum thaianum Iamwiriyakul, 2006

= Paphiopedilum thaianum =

Species of orchid

Paphiopedilum thaianum, or the Thai paphiopedium, is a species of slipper orchid endemic to peninsular Thailand. The orchid species is found in primary forest shade, on the slopes of steep limestone hillsides and cliffs. It is found at an elevation of 350–450 meters above sea level.

== Taxonomy ==
It was initially described by Prapanth Iamwiriyakul in 2006. However, P. thaianum is considered as very similar to P. niveum, with the key difference being the flower of P. thaianum is significantly smaller than P. niveum. As such, it is still uncertain whether P. thaianum should be considered as a standalone Paphiopedilum species or a variety of P. niveum, as long understood by local enthusiasts before Iamwiriyakul's description. Another proposition of P. thaianum's differentiation is its distinct fragrant smell.

== Description ==
Its leaves are 3–10 centimetres (1.2–3.9 in) in length and 1–3 centimetres (0.39–1.18 in) wide, with its upper surface being mottled dark and pale green in colour, while its lower surface is spotted with purple. Its purple, shortly white-pubescent inflorescence, being 6–17 centimetres (2.4–6.7 in) in height, consists of a single white flower (two flowers in rare cases) 3–5 centimetres (1.2–2.0 in) wide, having a staminode with green to yellow-green centers, with peak flowering in April and May. It grows under shrubs on limestone slopes in wet tropical biomes, with 2 centimetres (0.79 in) of humus as medium.

A 2012 study determined the main pollinator of P. thaianum as Lasioglossum orchidodeceptum, which notably differed from P. niveum being pollinated by Tetragonula testaceitarsis due to the differing flower sizes.

== Distribution ==
P. thaianum is distributed within the Phang Nga region of southern Thai, within altitudes of 350–450 metres (1,150–1,480 ft) and a mean temperature of 22–25 °C (72–77 °F).
