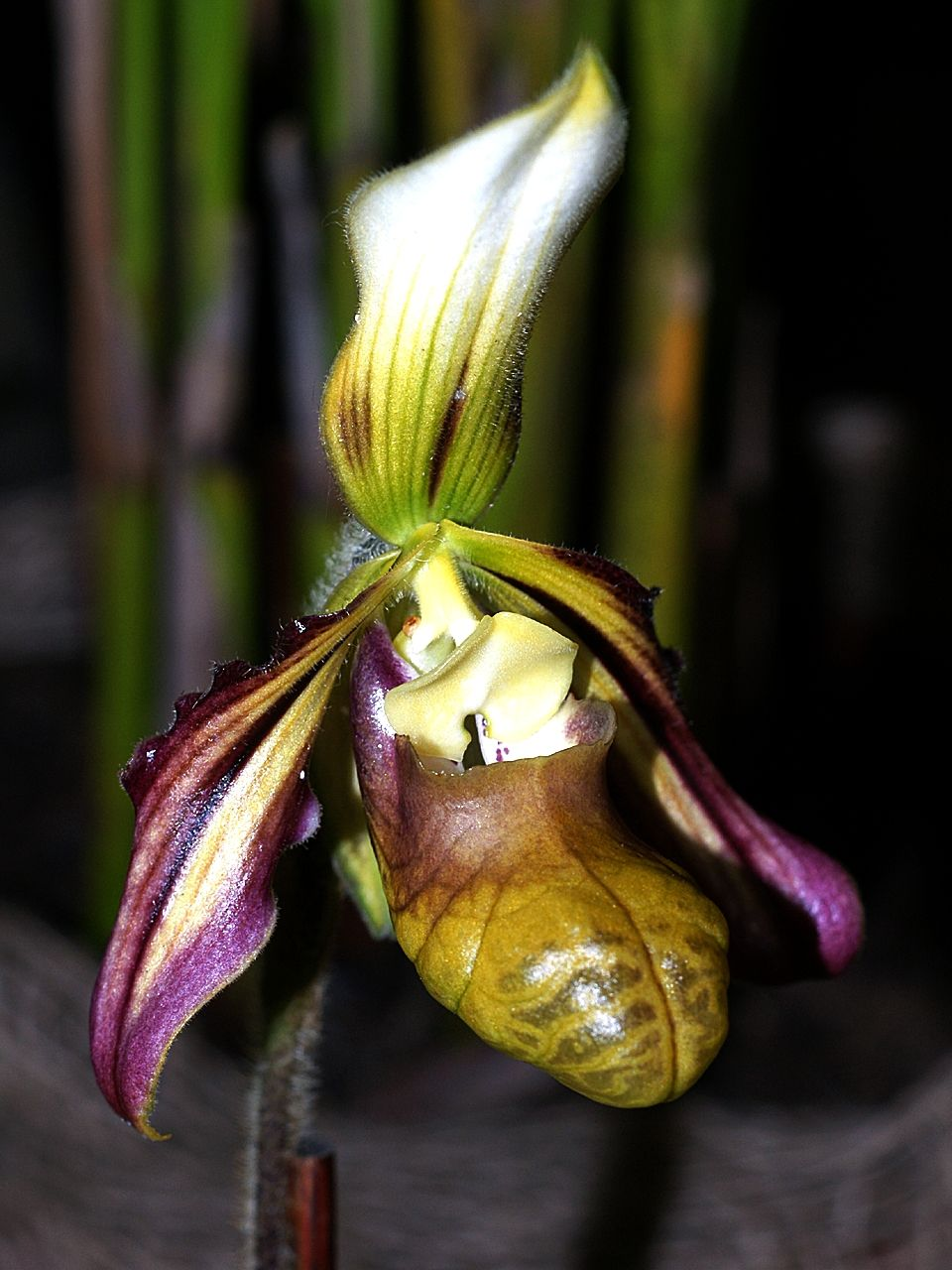
- Flower of Paphiopedilum sangii

Scientific classification
- Kingdom: Plantae
- Clade: Tracheophytes
- Clade: Angiosperms
- Clade: Monocots
- Order: Asparagales
- Family: Orchidaceae
- Subfamily: Cypripedioideae
- Genus: Paphiopedilum
- Species: P. sangii

Binomial name
- Paphiopedilum sangii Braem

Synonyms
- Paphiopedilum sangii var. ayubianum O.Gruss & Roeth

= Paphiopedilum sangii =

Species of orchid

Paphiopedilum sangii is a species of orchid endemic to northern Sulawesi.
