= Paphiopedilum wentworthianum =

Conservation status
- Critically Endangered (IUCN 3.1)

Scientific classification
- Kingdom: Plantae
- Clade: Tracheophytes
- Clade: Angiosperms
- Clade: Monocots
- Order: Asparagales
- Family: Orchidaceae
- Subfamily: Cypripedioideae
- Genus: Paphiopedilum
- Species: P. wentworthianum

Binomial name
- Paphiopedilum wentworthianum Schoser & Fowlie

Species of orchid

Paphiopedilum wentworthianum, or the Wentworth's paphiopedilum, is a species of orchid, endemic to the islands of Guadalcanal and Bougainville. The species is considered to be difficult to be cultivated, and thus, rare in culture.

== Taxonomy ==
P. wentworthianum was named after Clayton Wentworth who recollected the species, then introduced a few plants into cultivation, few years after its discovery in Bougainville.

== Description ==
P. wentworthianum is a warm to cool-climate epiphyte available in altitudes of 900–2,800 metres (3,000–9,200 ft), and grows on deep layers of humus on forest floors over volcanic rock. Its leaves of five are described as narrowly oblong to elliptic-oblong, coloured tessellated dark and light green, and shortly pubescent. Leaves are 4–6 centimetres (0.13–0.20 ft) or 12–25 centimetres (0.39–0.82 ft) long and 3–5 centimetres (0.098–0.164 ft) wide, coloured above mottled dark and light green. Its erect, terminal inflorescence with height of up to 35 centimetres (1.15 ft) consist of a single flower of up to 8 centimetres (0.26 ft) wide that blooms in the late winter and early spring, with an elliptic-ovate floral bract.

== Distribution ==
P. wentworthianum were discovered as an endemic species mainly to the islands of Guadalcanal and Bougainville. Since its discovery in 1962, the species gained various threats such as shifting agriculture. It was rediscovered in 1984 in a hardly accessible spot in Guadalcanal, and a 1986 report by P. J. Cribb suggested that there were only 100 to 200 individuals present in the wild.
