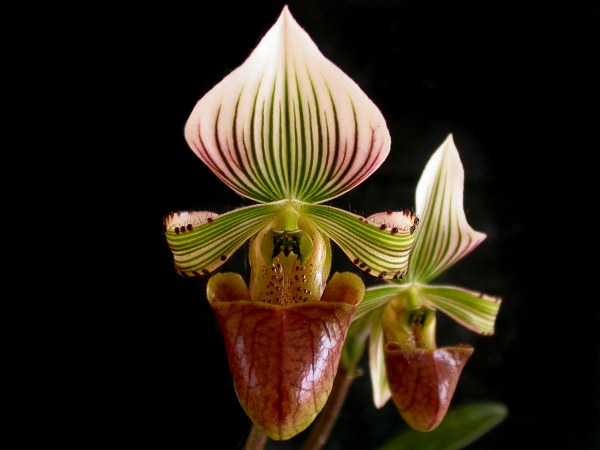
- Flower of Paphiopedilum hennisianum

Scientific classification
- Kingdom: Plantae
- Clade: Tracheophytes
- Clade: Angiosperms
- Clade: Monocots
- Order: Asparagales
- Family: Orchidaceae
- Subfamily: Cypripedioideae
- Genus: Paphiopedilum
- Species: P. hennisianum

Binomial name
- Paphiopedilum hennisianum (M.W.Wood) Fowlie

Synonyms
- Paphiopedilum barbatum var. hennisianum M.W.Wood (basionym); Paphiopedilum hennisianum var. christiansenii O.Gruss & Roeth; Paphiopedilum hennisianum f. christiansenii (O.Gruss & Roeth) O.Gruss & Roeth (1999)

= Paphiopedilum hennisianum =

Species of orchid

Paphiopedilum hennisianum is a species of orchid endemic to central Philippines (Panay, Negros islands of the Visayas).
