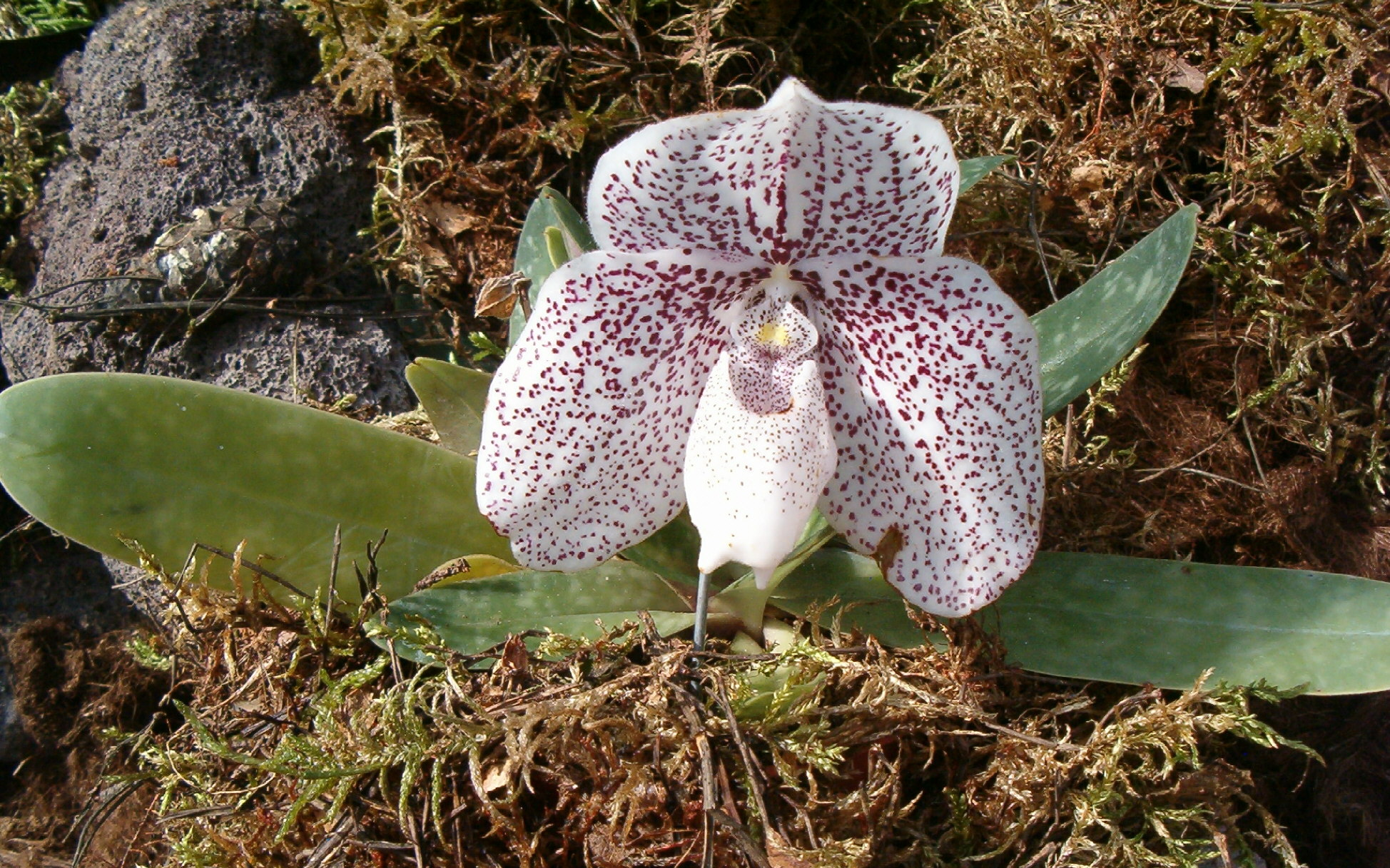

Scientific classification
- Kingdom: Plantae
- Clade: Tracheophytes
- Clade: Angiosperms
- Clade: Monocots
- Order: Asparagales
- Family: Orchidaceae
- Subfamily: Cypripedioideae
- Genus: Paphiopedilum
- Species: P. godefroyae

Binomial name
- Paphiopedilum godefroyae (God.-Leb.) Stein

Synonyms
- Cypripedium godefroyae God.-Leb. (basionym); Cordula godefroyae (God.-Leb.) Rolfe; Paphiopedilum leucochilum (Rolfe) Fowlie; Paphiopedilum ang-thong Fowlie

= Paphiopedilum godefroyae =

Species of orchid

Paphiopedilum godefroyae is a species of orchid endemic to peninsular Thailand, Vietnam and Malaysia. This species is found just above sea level on limestone cliffs. The flowers are around 9 cm across, creamy white to light green. They flower from December to July.
