= Paphiopedilum rungsuriyanum =

Scientific classification
- Kingdom: Plantae
- Clade: Tracheophytes
- Clade: Angiosperms
- Clade: Monocots
- Order: Asparagales
- Family: Orchidaceae
- Subfamily: Cypripedioideae
- Genus: Paphiopedilum
- Species: P. rungsuriyanum

Binomial name
- Paphiopedilum rungsuriyanum O.Gruss, Rungruang, Chaisur. & Dionisio

Species of orchid

Paphiopedilum rungsuriyanum is an Asian species of slipper orchid endemic to Laos.

== Description ==
Paphiopedilum rungsuriyanum has been described as miniature with its tesselated leaves spanning only a couple of inches. The flower is a mix of pink, maroon, and green. The flower is approximately as large as the rest of the plant. It has similar leaves and size to Paphiopedilum canhii, but the flower morphology differs significantly.

== Taxonomy ==
Paphiopedilum rungsuriyanum is similar to Paphiopedilum canhii and was originally identified from smuggled plants under the name P. canhii by Rungruang and Chaisuriya. The species name is a combination of the names Rungruang and Chaisuriya who described the plant in 2014. In 2017 the species was placed in the subgenus Paphiopedilum and section Laosianum.

== Distribution ==
Paphiopedilum rungsuriyanum was originally discovered in 2014 and is only known to occur in Laos.
