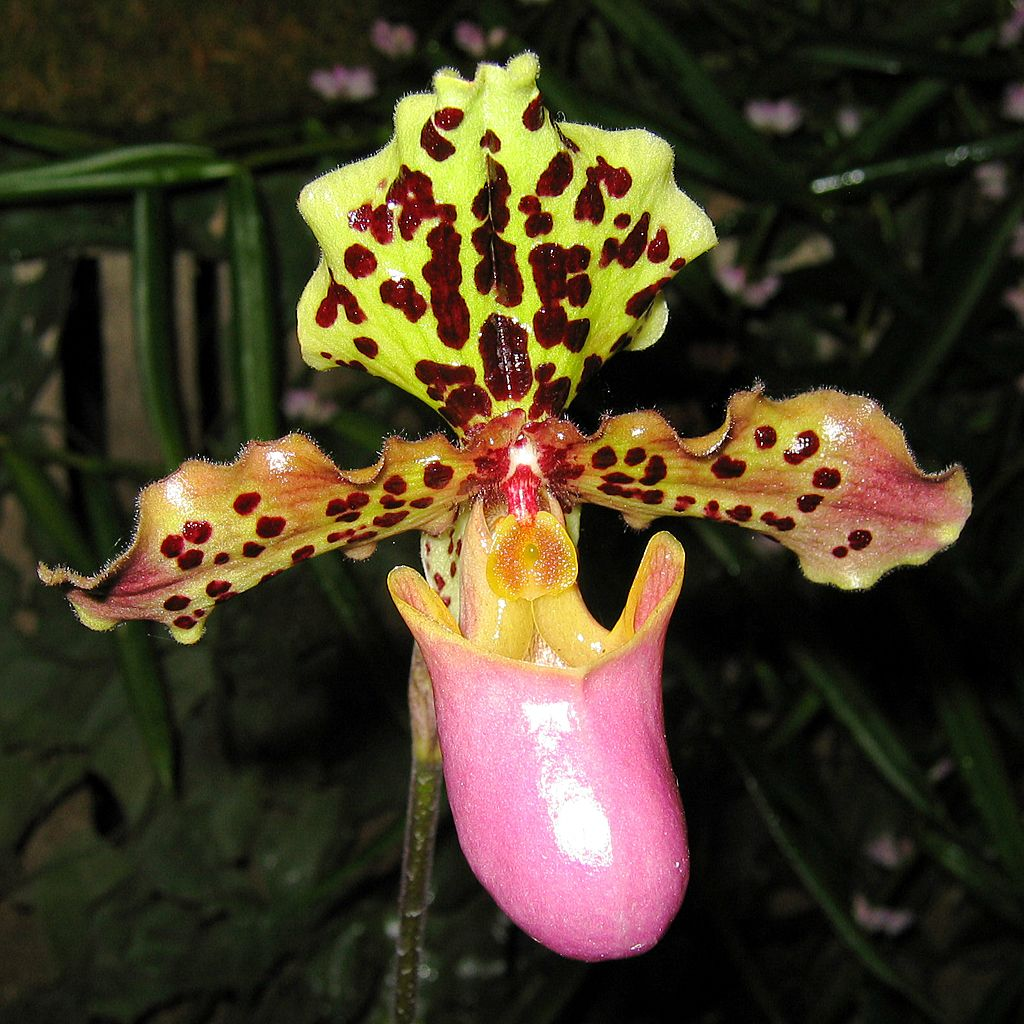
- Flower of Paphiopedilum henryanum

Scientific classification
- Kingdom: Plantae
- Clade: Tracheophytes
- Clade: Angiosperms
- Clade: Monocots
- Order: Asparagales
- Family: Orchidaceae
- Subfamily: Cypripedioideae
- Genus: Paphiopedilum
- Species: P. henryanum

Binomial name
- Paphiopedilum henryanum Braem

Synonyms
- Paphiopedilum dollii Lückel; Paphiopedilum henryanum var. christae Braem; Paphiopedilum chaoi H.S.Hua; Paphiopedilum henryanum f. christae (Braem) O.Gruss & Roeth; Paphiopedilum henryanum f. album O.Gruss

= Paphiopedilum henryanum =

Species of orchid

Paphiopedilum henryanum is a species of orchid ranging from southeastern Yunnan and Guangxi to northern Vietnam. It is named for orchid hunter Henry Azadehdel.
