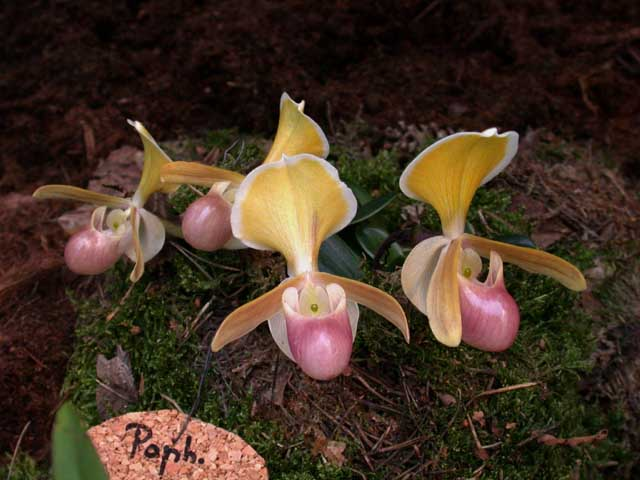
- Flower of Paphiopedilum helenae

Conservation status
- Critically Endangered (IUCN 3.1)
- CITES Appendix I

Scientific classification
- Kingdom: Plantae
- Clade: Tracheophytes
- Clade: Angiosperms
- Clade: Monocots
- Order: Asparagales
- Family: Orchidaceae
- Subfamily: Cypripedioideae
- Genus: Paphiopedilum
- Species: P. helenae

Binomial name
- Paphiopedilum helenae Aver.

Synonyms
- Paphiopedilum helenae f. aureum O.Gruss & Roeth; Paphiopedilum delicatum Z.J.Liu & J.Y.Zhang; Paphiopedilum helenae var. peschutteri Roeth

= Paphiopedilum helenae =

Species of orchid

Paphiopedilum helenae is a species of orchid endemic to Cao Bằng Province of Vietnam.
