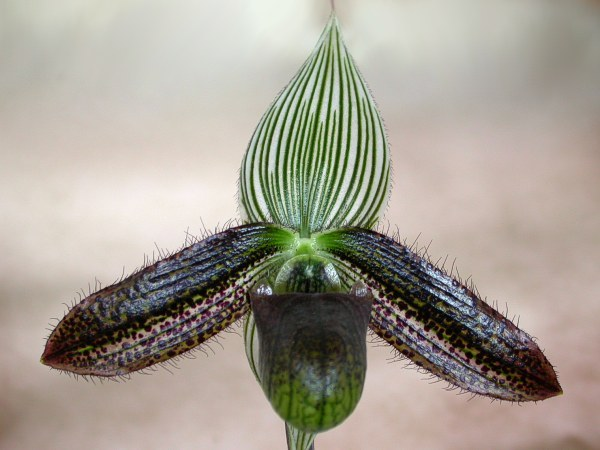
- Flower of Paphiopedilum wardii

Scientific classification
- Kingdom: Plantae
- Clade: Tracheophytes
- Clade: Angiosperms
- Clade: Monocots
- Order: Asparagales
- Family: Orchidaceae
- Subfamily: Cypripedioideae
- Genus: Paphiopedilum
- Species: P. wardii

Binomial name
- Paphiopedilum wardii Summerh.

Synonyms
- Cypripedium vernayi F.K.Ward; Cypripedium wardianum E.W.Cooper; Paphiopedilum wardii var. alboviride O.Gruss & Roeth; Paphiopedilum wardii f. alboviride (O.Gruss & Roeth) Braem; Paphiopedilum brevilabium Z.J.Liu & J.Yong Zhang; Paphiopedilum burmanicum J.Yong Zhang & Z.J.Liu; Paphiopedilum microchilum Z.J.Liu & S.C.Chen; Paphiopedilum multifolium Z.J.Liu & J.Yong Zhang; Paphiopedilum wardii f. ying-xiangii F.Y.Liu & Z.F.Zhao

= Paphiopedilum wardii =

Species of orchid

Paphiopedilum wardii is a species of orchid found from southwestern Yunnan to Myanmar.
