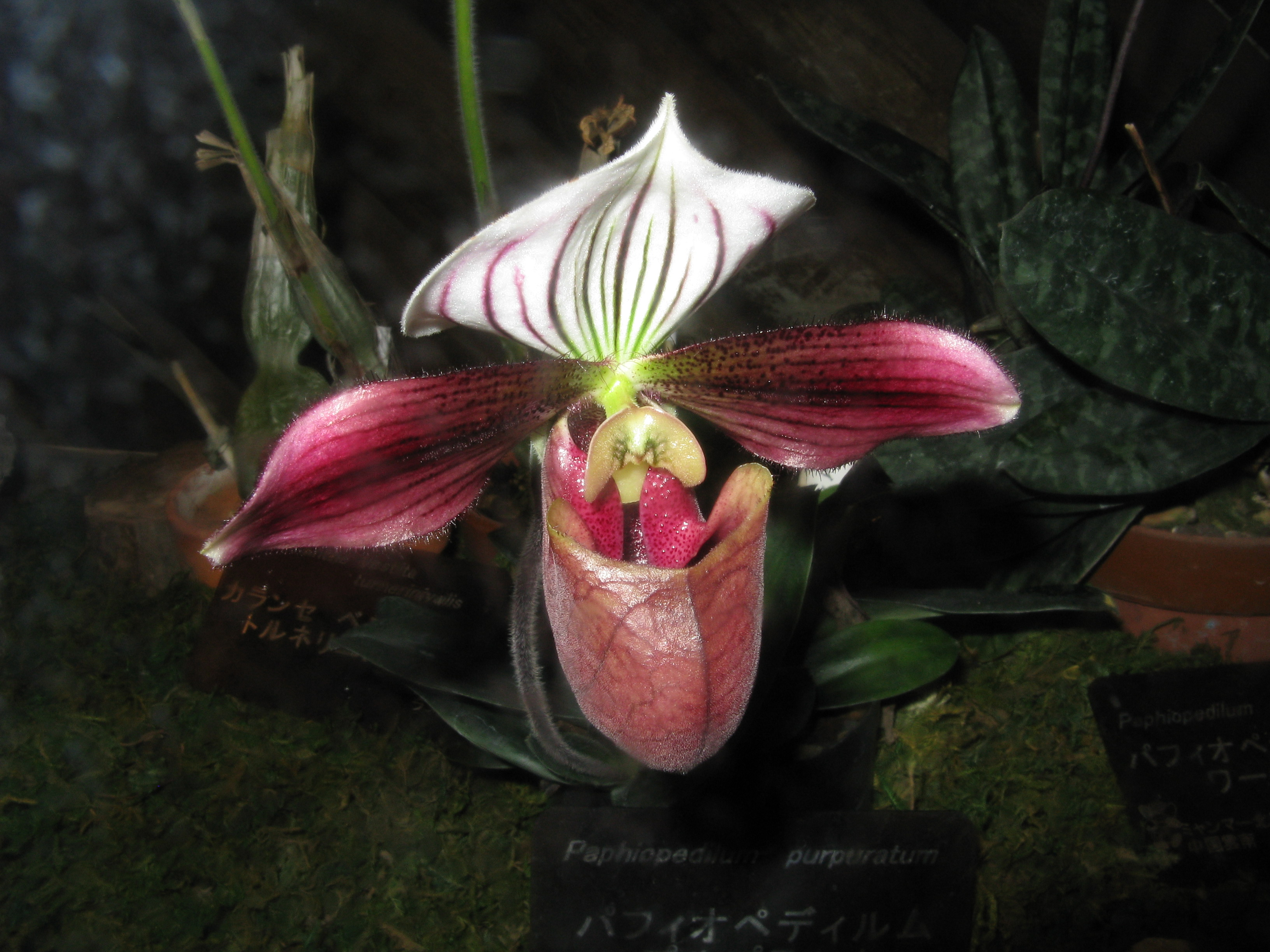
- Flower of Paphiopedilum purpuratum

Conservation status
- Critically Endangered (IUCN 3.1)

Scientific classification
- Kingdom: Plantae
- Clade: Tracheophytes
- Clade: Angiosperms
- Clade: Monocots
- Order: Asparagales
- Family: Orchidaceae
- Subfamily: Cypripedioideae
- Genus: Paphiopedilum
- Species: P. purpuratum

Binomial name
- Paphiopedilum purpuratum (Lindl.) Stein

Synonyms
- Cypripedium purpuratum Lindl. (basionym); Cordula purpurata (Lindl.) Rolfe

= Paphiopedilum purpuratum =

Species of orchid

Paphiopedilum purpuratum is a species of orchids found from southern China to Hainan Island. The species was discovered on Hong Kong Island in 1850.

This forest species is Critically Endangered in the wild, with an estimated global population of fewer than 250 individuals. The main causes of ongoing decline are habitat loss and degradation.

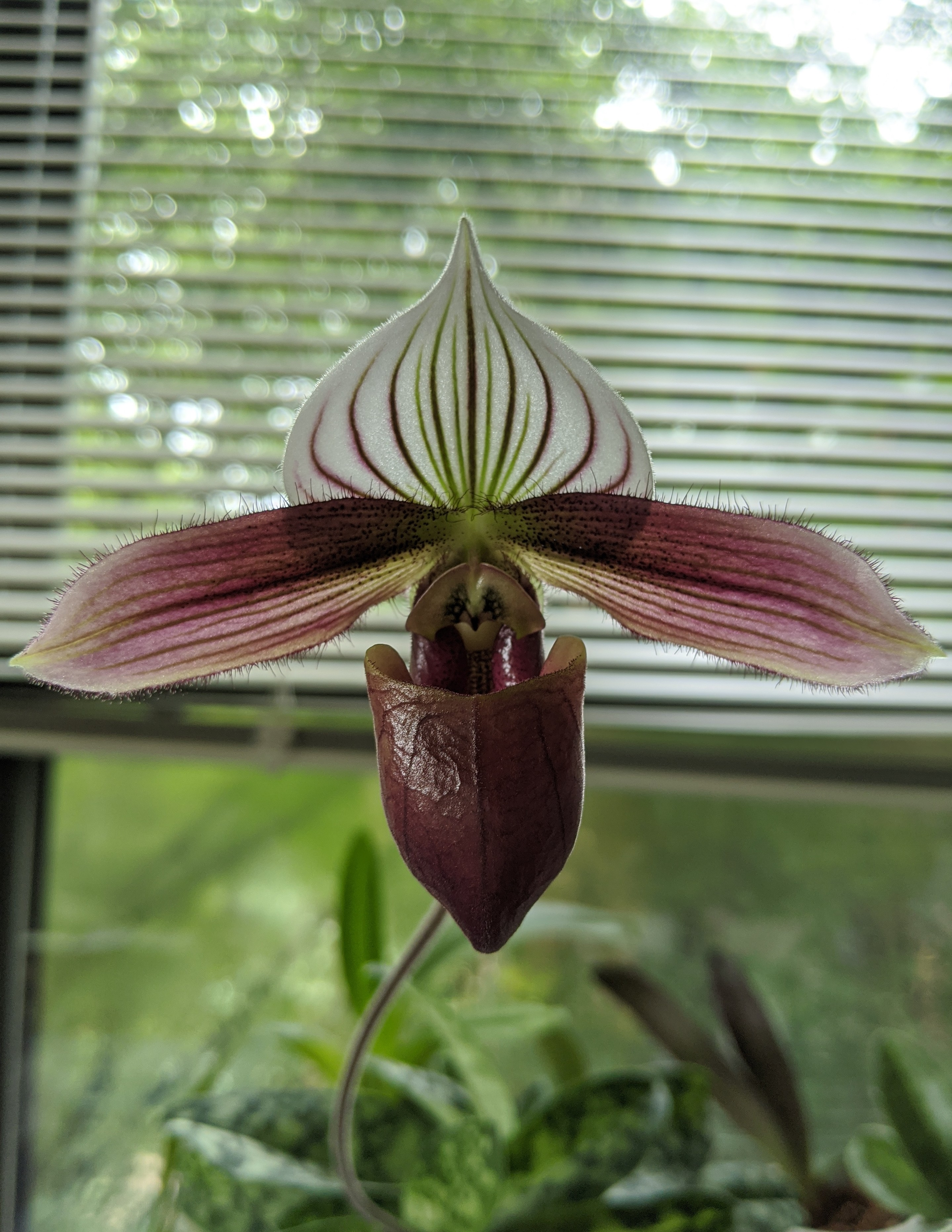
Paphiopedilum purpuratum exhibiting good symmetry.
