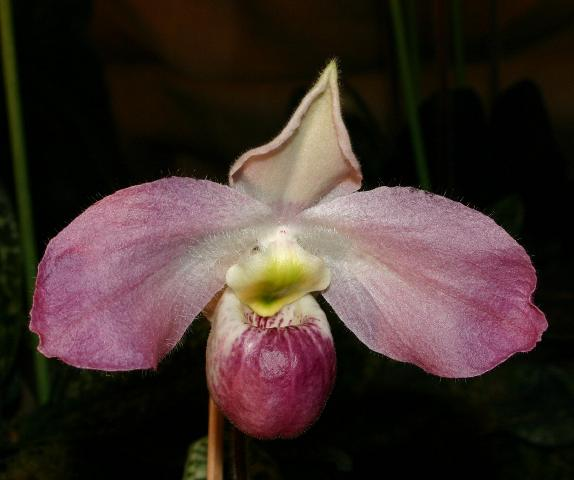
- Flower of Paphiopedilum vietnamense

Scientific classification
- Kingdom: Plantae
- Clade: Tracheophytes
- Clade: Angiosperms
- Clade: Monocots
- Order: Asparagales
- Family: Orchidaceae
- Subfamily: Cypripedioideae
- Genus: Paphiopedilum
- Species: P. vietnamense

Binomial name
- Paphiopedilum vietnamense O.Gruss ex Perner

Synonyms
- Paphiopedilum hilmarii Senghas & Schettler; Paphiopedilum mirabile Cavestro & Chiron

= Paphiopedilum vietnamense =

Species of orchid

Paphiopedilum vietnamense is a species of orchid found from Thái Nguyên Province in northern Vietnam. It was discovered in 1997 and it is endangered.
