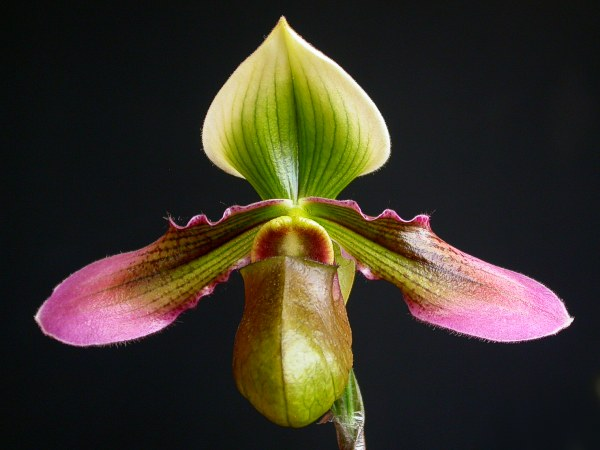
- Flower of Paphiopedilum hookerae

Scientific classification
- Kingdom: Plantae
- Clade: Tracheophytes
- Clade: Angiosperms
- Clade: Monocots
- Order: Asparagales
- Family: Orchidaceae
- Subfamily: Cypripedioideae
- Genus: Paphiopedilum
- Species: P. hookerae

Binomial name
- Paphiopedilum hookerae (Rchb.f.) Stein

Synonyms
- Cypripedium hookerae Rchb.f. (basionym); Cordula hookerae (Rchb.f.) Rolfe

= Paphiopedilum hookerae =

Species of orchid

Paphiopedilum hookerae is a species of orchid endemic to Borneo.

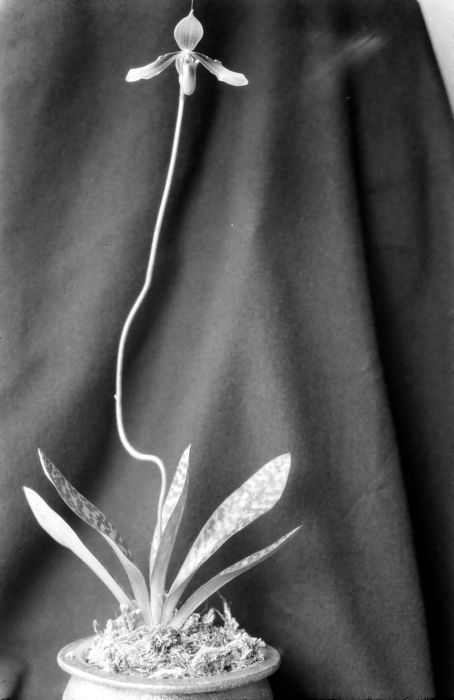
Paphiopedilum hookerae
