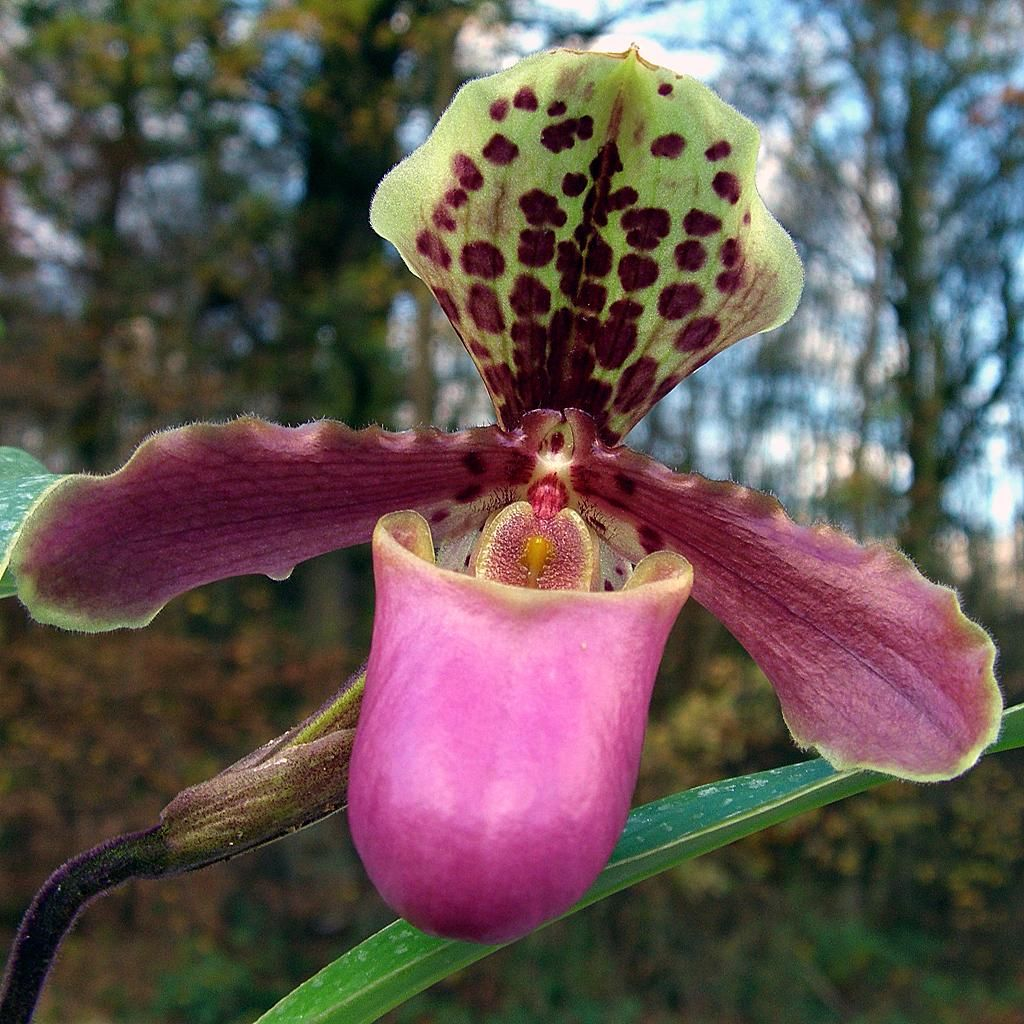
- Paphiopedilum henryanum

Conservation status
- CITES Appendix I

Scientific classification
- Kingdom: Plantae
- Clade: Tracheophytes
- Clade: Angiosperms
- Clade: Monocots
- Order: Asparagales
- Family: Orchidaceae
- Subfamily: Cypripedioideae
- Genus: Paphiopedilum; Pfitzer

Type species
- Paphiopedilum insigne

Subgenera
- 7, see text

Diversity
- About 80 species
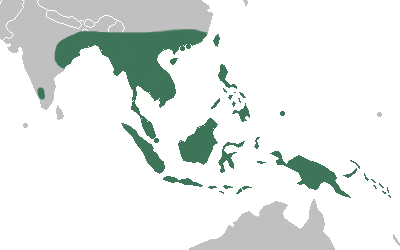

Synonyms
- Cordula Raf.; Menephora Raf.; Stimegas Raf.

= Paphiopedilum =

Venus slipper

Genus of orchids

Paphiopedilum, often called the Venus slipper, is a genus of the lady slipper orchid subfamily Cypripedioideae of the flowering plant family Orchidaceae. The genus comprises some 80 accepted taxa including several natural hybrids. The genus is native to Southeast Asia, the Indian subcontinent, southern China, New Guinea and the Solomon and Bismarck Islands. The type species of this genus is Paphiopedilum insigne.

The species and their hybrids are extensively cultivated, and are known as either paphiopedilums, or by the abbreviation paphs in horticulture.

Due to their popularity, Paphiopedilums have been ruthlessly gathered and poached from the wild, making them very rare or extinct there. As soon as a new species or population is discovered, poachers take the plants for orchid collectors who pay large sums of money. Habitat destruction is an additional factor contributing to their rarity.

== Description ==
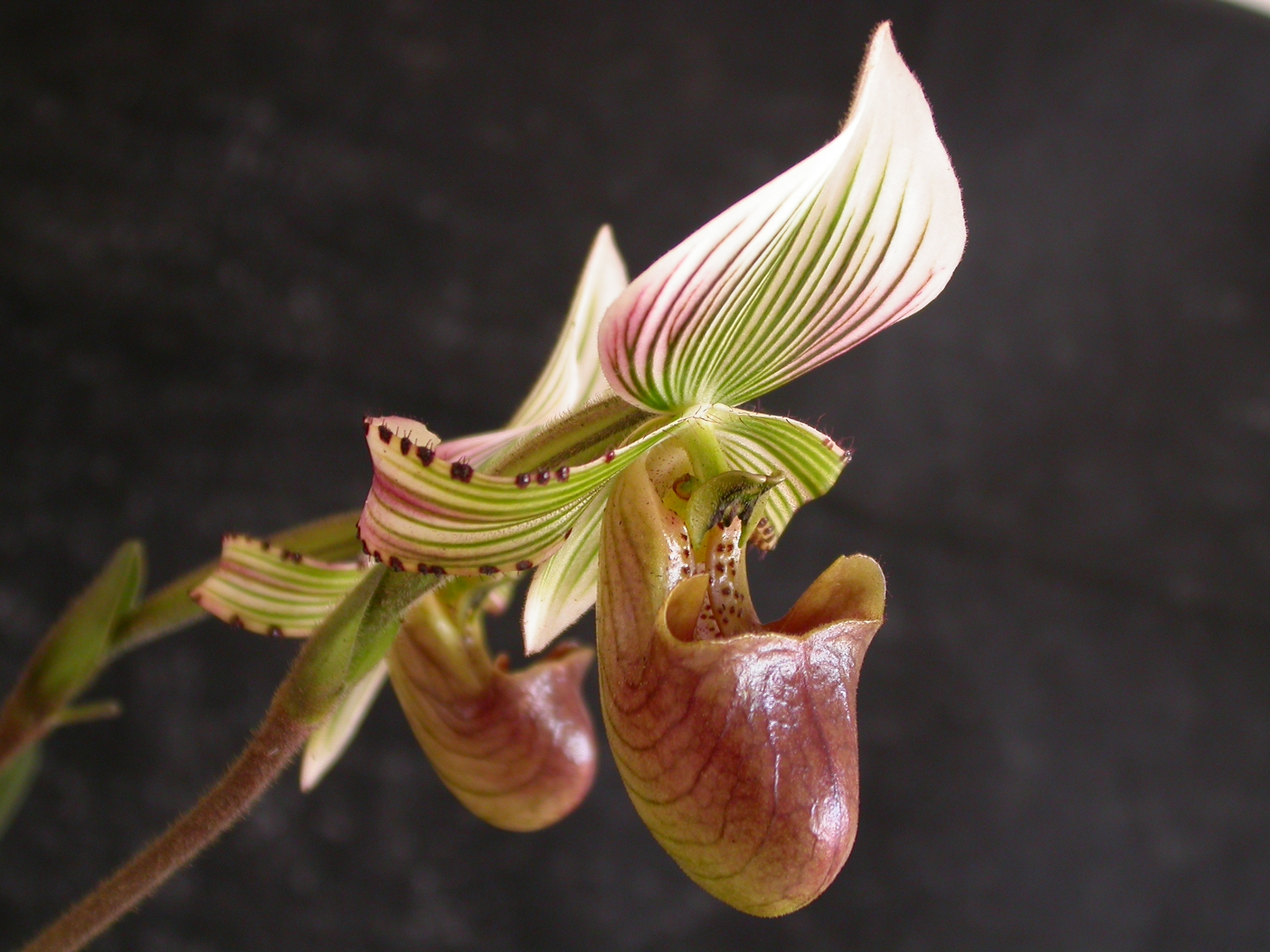
Paphiopedilum hennisianum flower, showing detail of the staminode (click to magnify)

Paphiopedilum species naturally occur among humus layers as terrestrials on the forest floor, while a few are true epiphytes and some are lithophytes. These sympodial orchids lack pseudobulbs. Instead, they grow robust shoots, each with several leaves; some are hemicryptophytes. The leaves can be short and rounded or long and narrow and typically have a mottled pattern. When older shoots die, newer ones take over. Each new shoot only blooms once when it is fully grown, producing a raceme between the fleshy, succulent leaves. The roots are thick and fleshy. Potted plants form a tight lump of roots that, when untangled, can be up to 1 m long.

Members of this genus are considered highly collectible by orchid fanciers due to the curious and unusual form of their flowers. Along with Cypripedium, Mexipedium, Phragmipedium and Selenipedium, the genus is a member of the subfamily Cypripedioideae, commonly referred to as the "lady's-slippers" or "slipper orchids" due to the unusual shape of the pouch-like labellum of the flower. The pouch traps insects seeking nectar, and to leave again they have to climb up past the staminode, behind which they collect or deposit pollinia. Orchids of this genus are notoriously difficult to propagate by tissue culture; as of 2016, commercial cultivation is almost exclusively seed-based. This means every plant is unique.

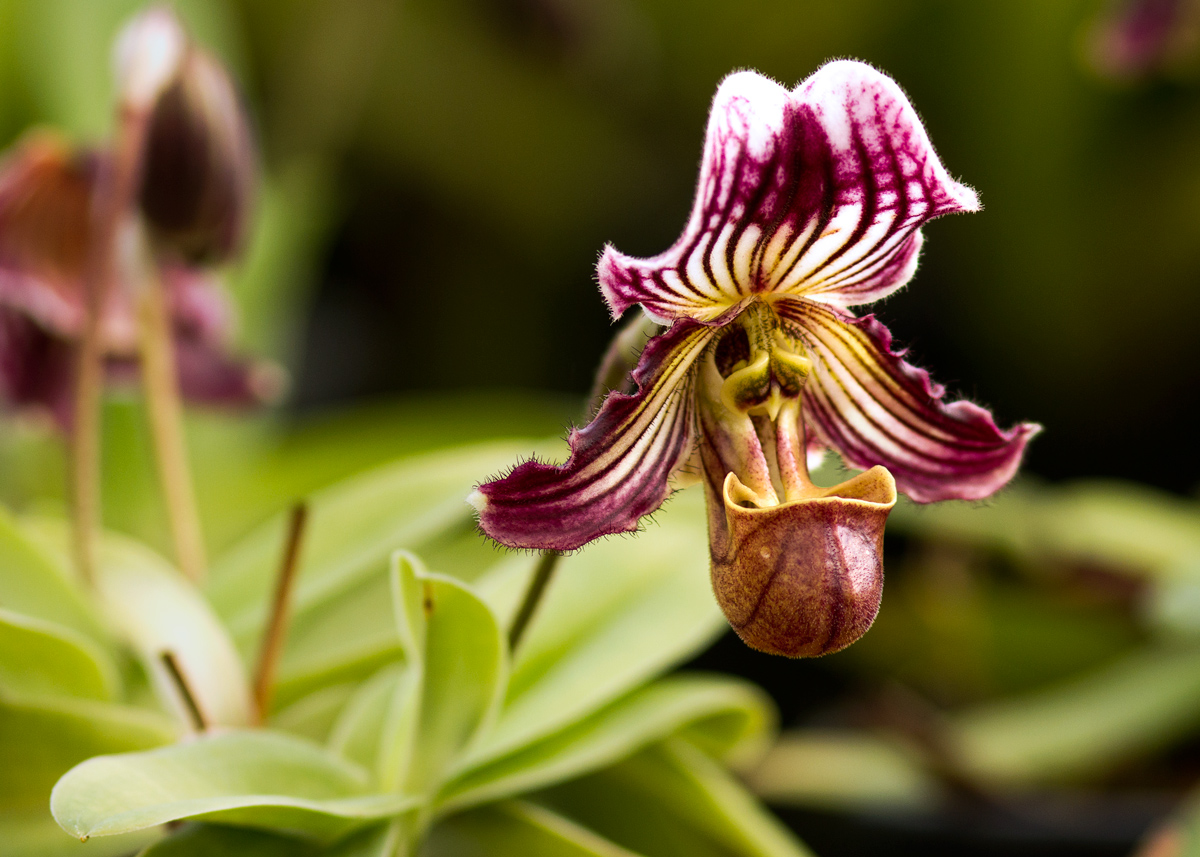
Paphiopedilum fairrieanum Orchid from Eastern Himalayas, India

Members of this genus have unusual stomata. Whereas most land plants' stomata have guard cells with chloroplasts in their cytoplasm (including those of closely related Phragmipedium slipper orchids), Paphiopedilum stomata do not. This difference results in simpler, but weaker control of stomatal function. For example, most plants close their stomata in response to either blue or red light, but Paphiopedilum guard cells only respond to blue light. The fact that they lack chloroplasts has made them valuable to researchers investigating stomatal function. For example, it enabled the discovery of intracellular events that precede stomatal closure.

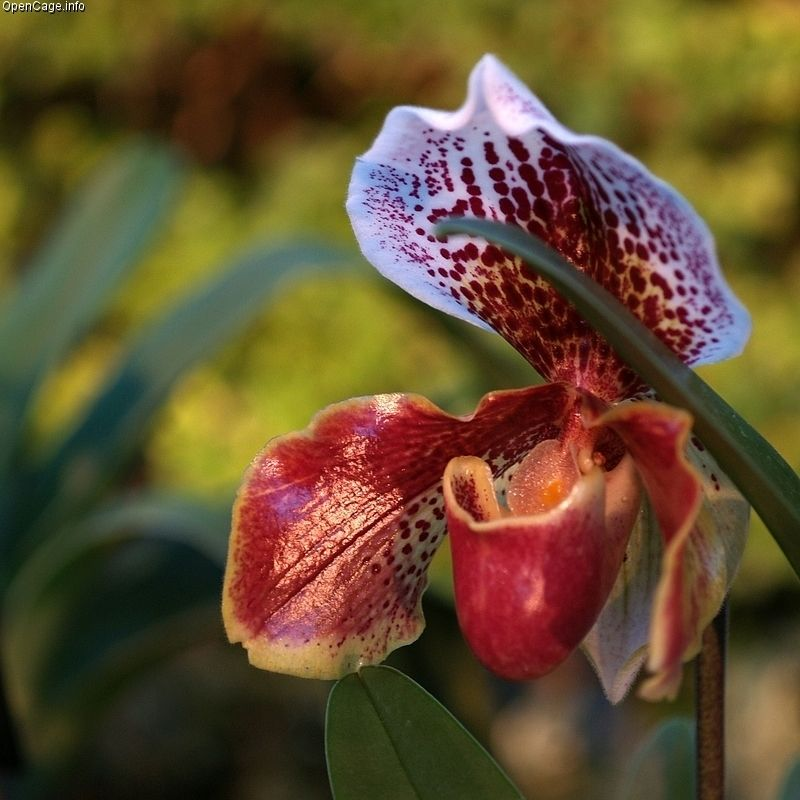
One of the "Miya" hybrid Paphiopedilum cultivars bred by T. Ozawa

== In horticulture ==
The paphiopedilums are among the most widely cultivated and hybridized of orchid genera. New species are still being discovered; for example the golden slipper orchid (P. armeniacum) was discovered in 1979 and described in 1982, and is known for its striking gold-colored flowers. In addition, growers have bred thousands of interspecific hybrids and registered them with the Royal Horticultural Society in London over the years.

Paphiopedilums are terrestrial and evergreen in growth habit, and by careful selection of species and hybrids, it is possible to have a flowering period extending over nine months of the year. They can be grown indoors, as long as conditions that mimic their natural habitats are created. Most species thrive in moderate to high humidity (50–70%), moderate temperatures ranging from 13 to 35 degrees Celsius and low light of 12,000 to 20,000 lux. Modern hybrids are typically easier to grow in artificial conditions than their parent species.

== Taxonomy and systematics ==
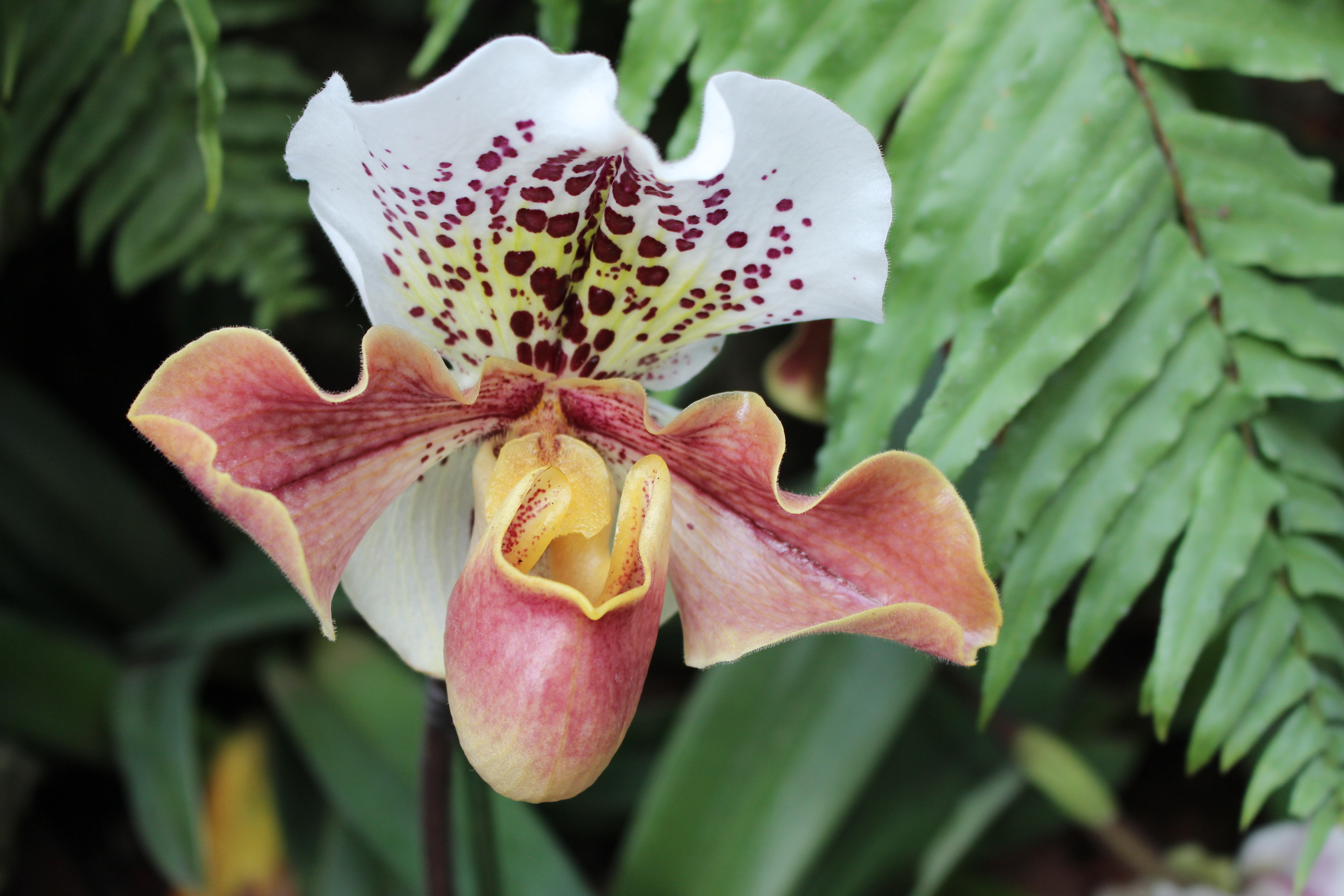
Paphiopedilum cultivar in Kew Gardens, England

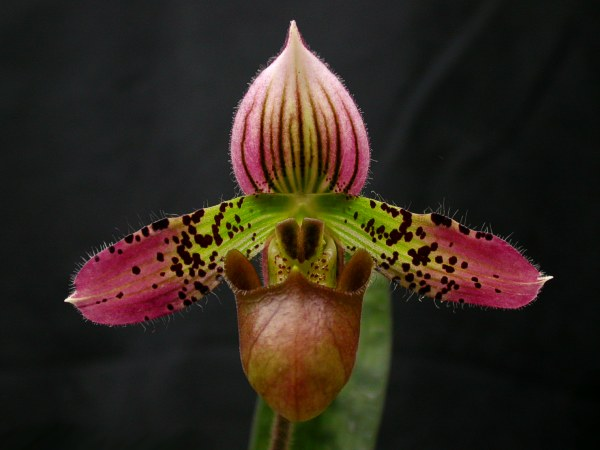
Paphiopedilum acmodontum

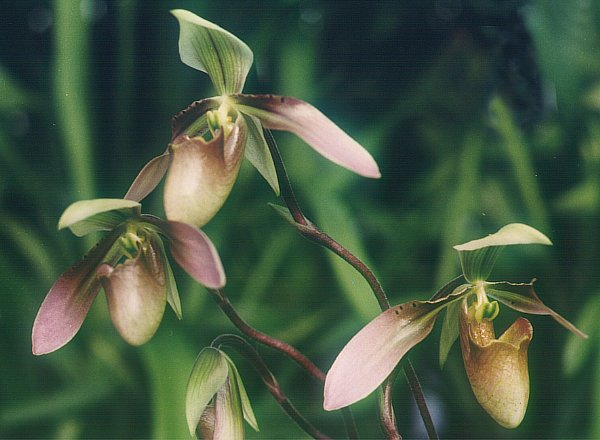
Paphiopedilum appletonianum

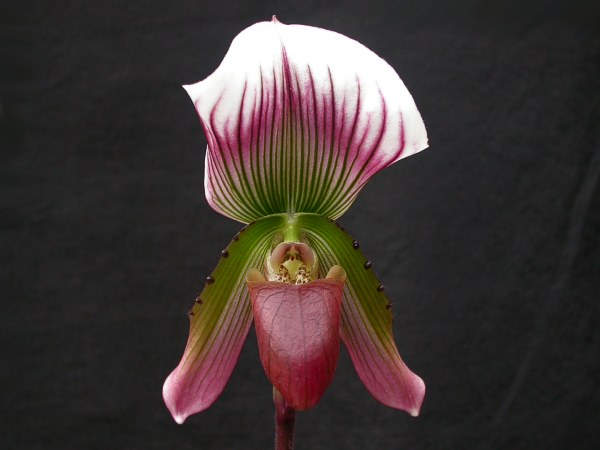
Paphiopedilum callosum

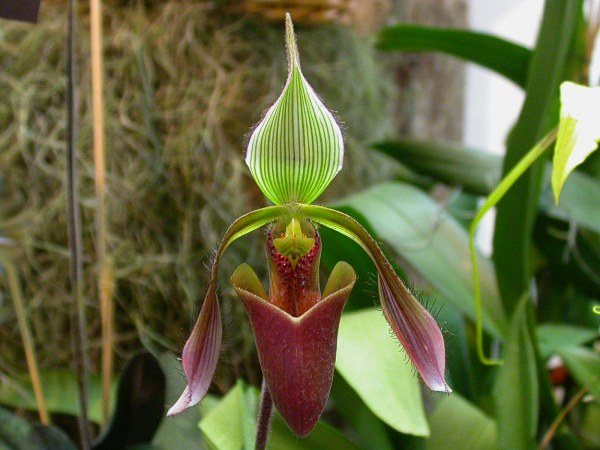
Paphiopedilum dayanum

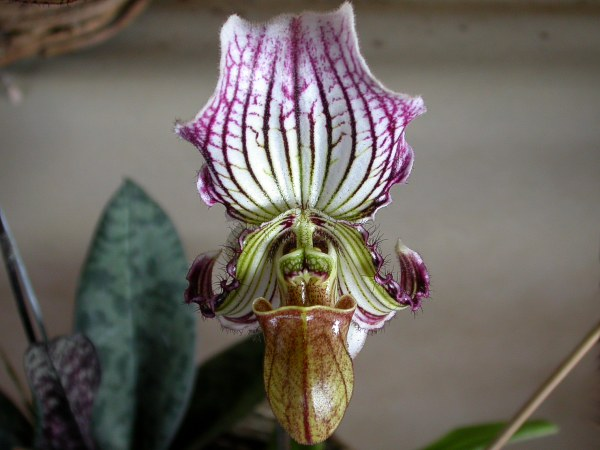
Paphiopedilum fairrieanum

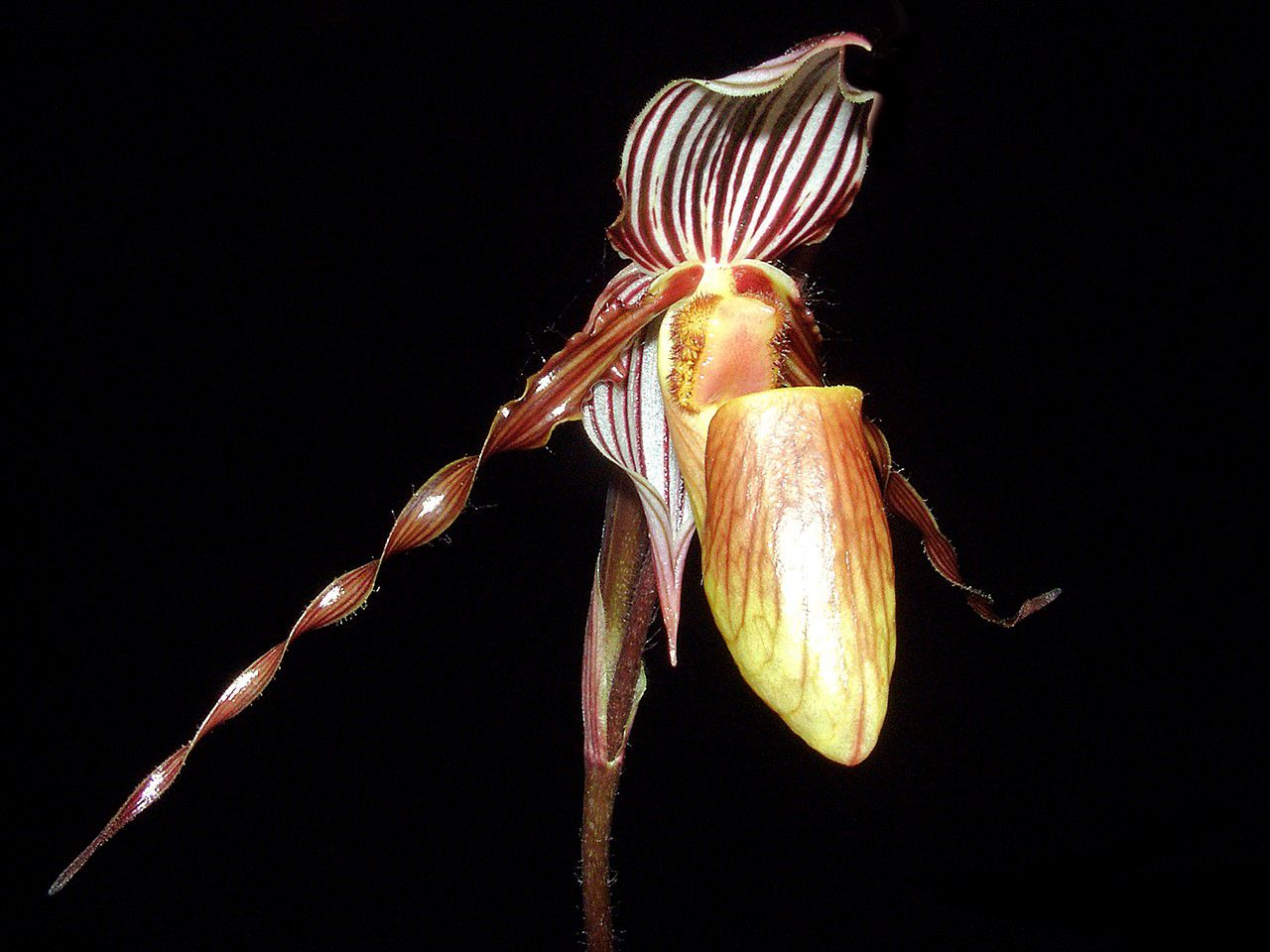
Paphiopedilum glanduliferum

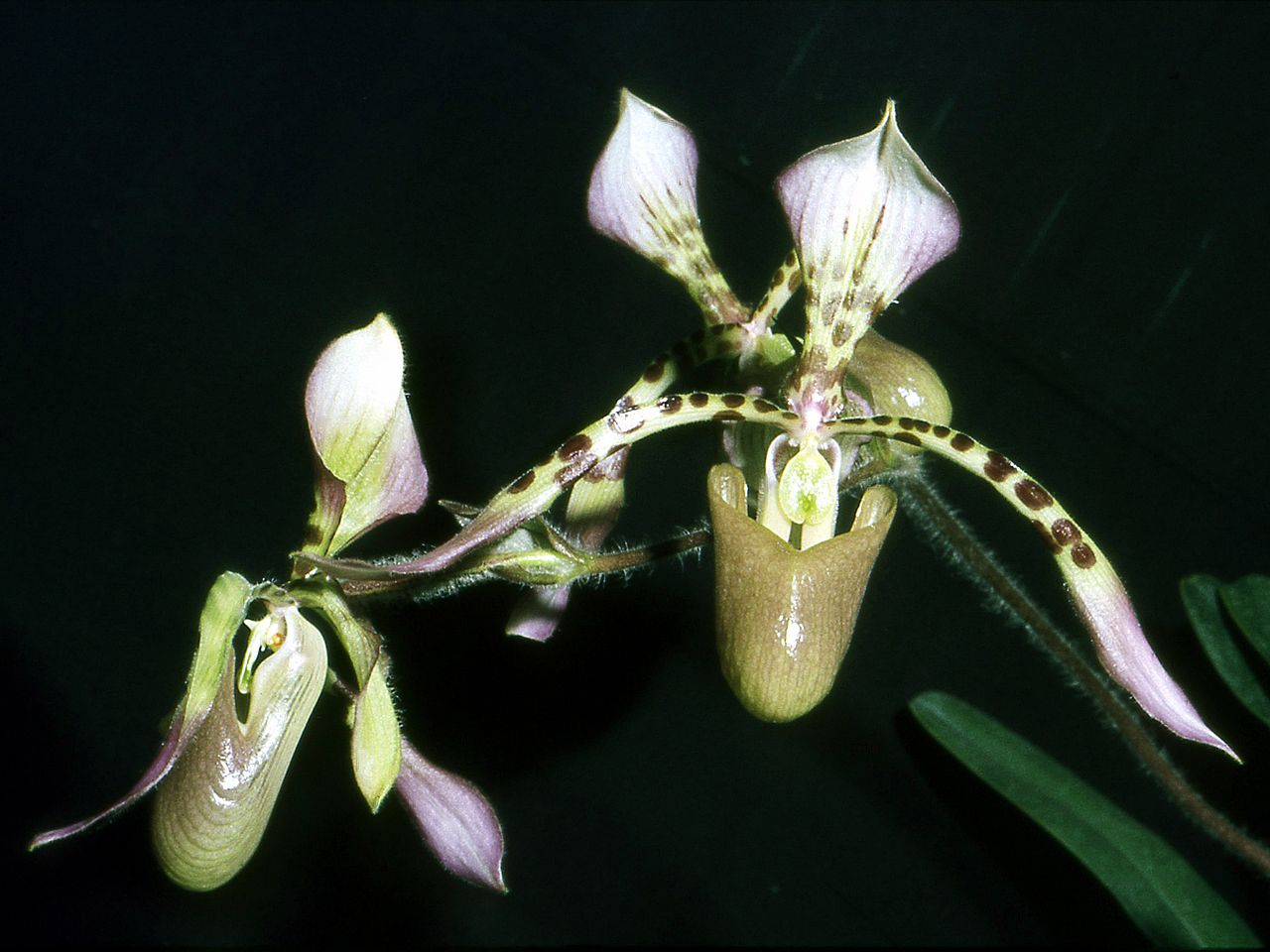
Paphiopedilum haynaldianum

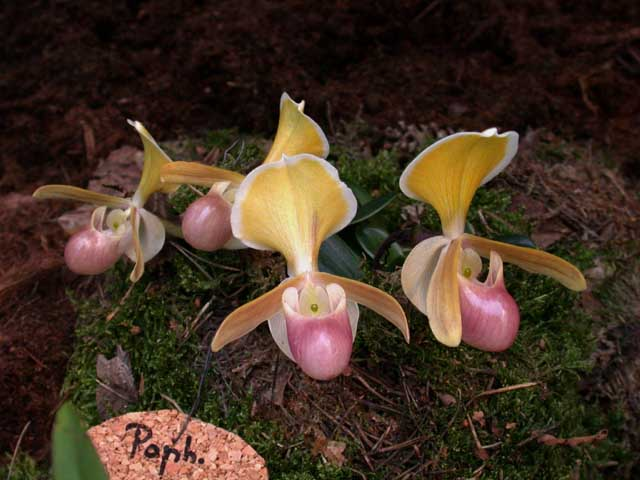
Paphiopedilum helenae

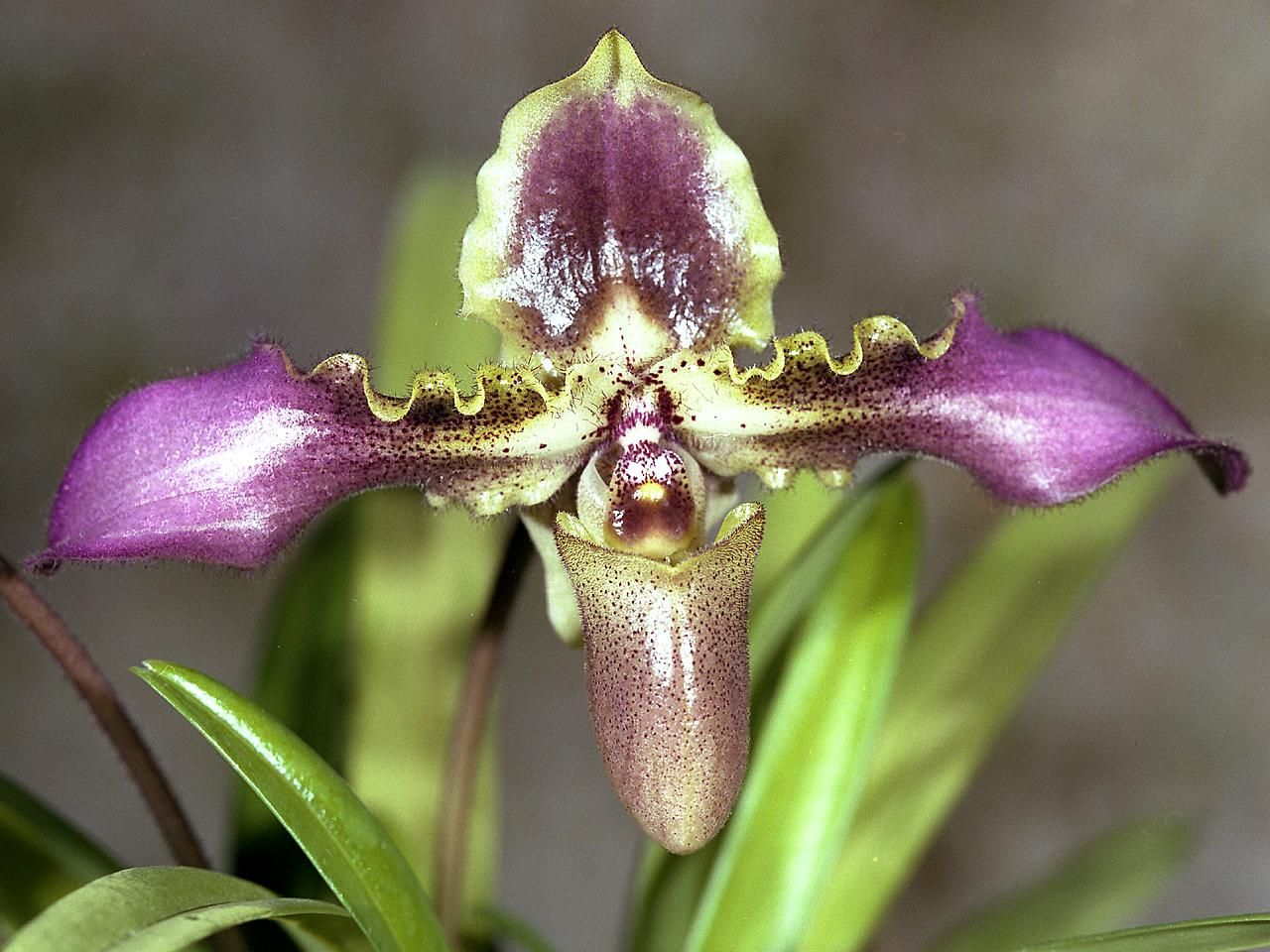
Paphiopedilum hirsutissimum

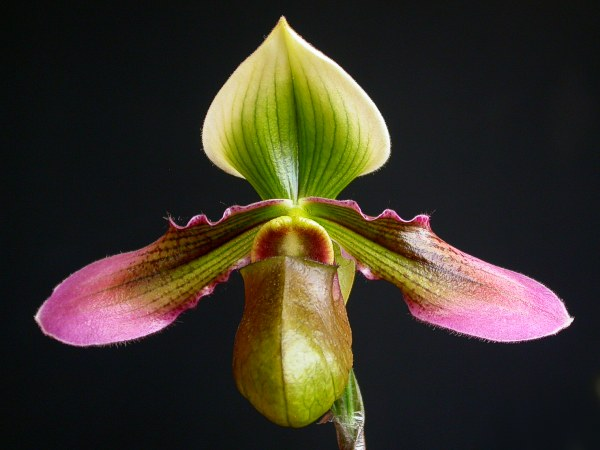
Paphiopedilum hookerii

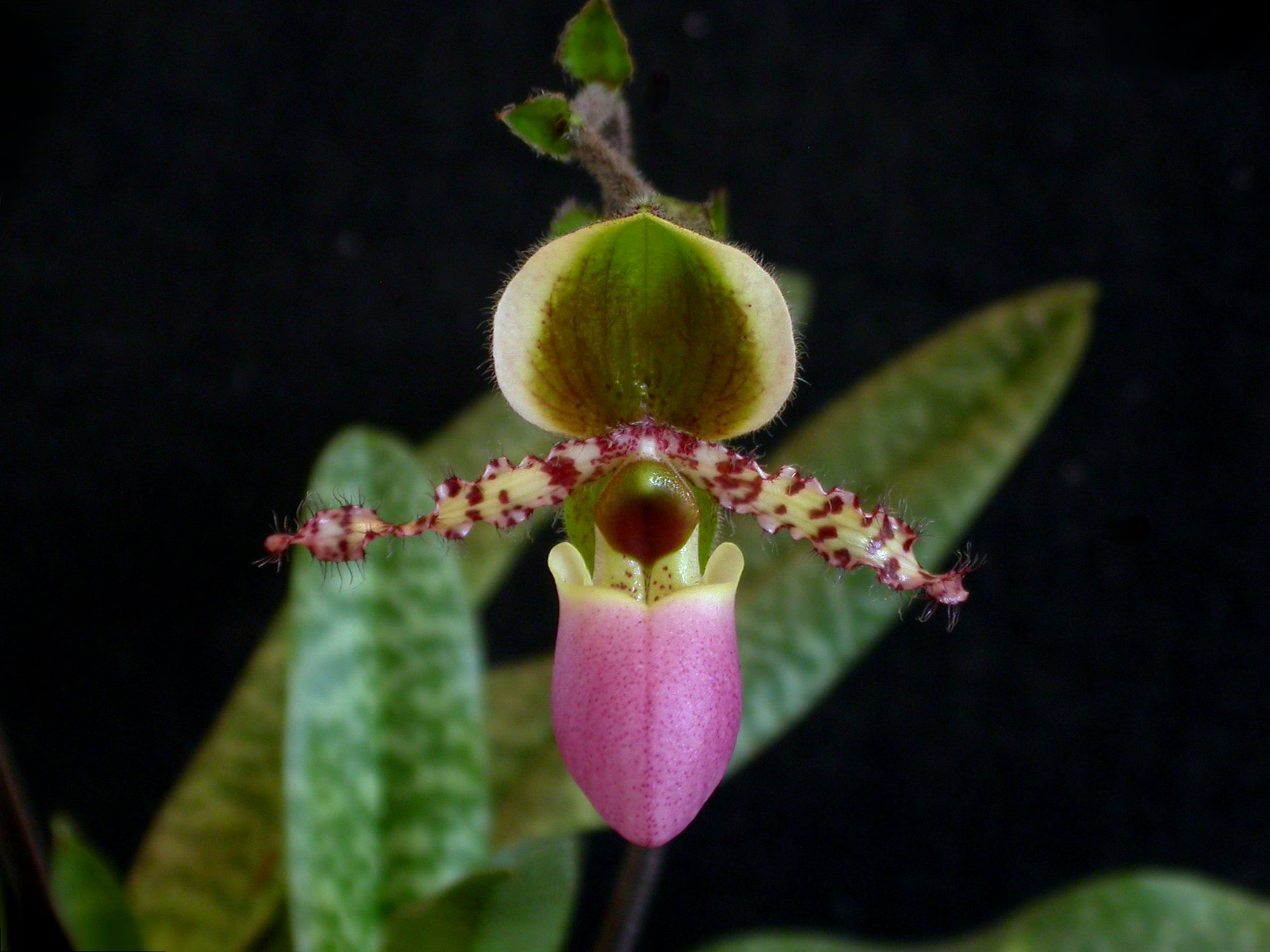
Paphiopedilum liemianum

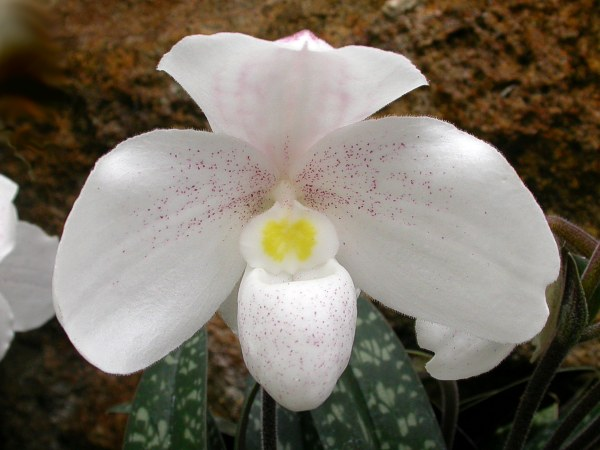
Paphiopedilum niveum

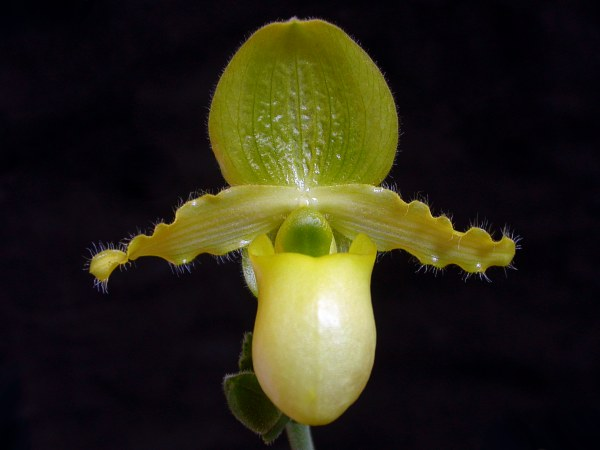
Paphiopedilum primulinum

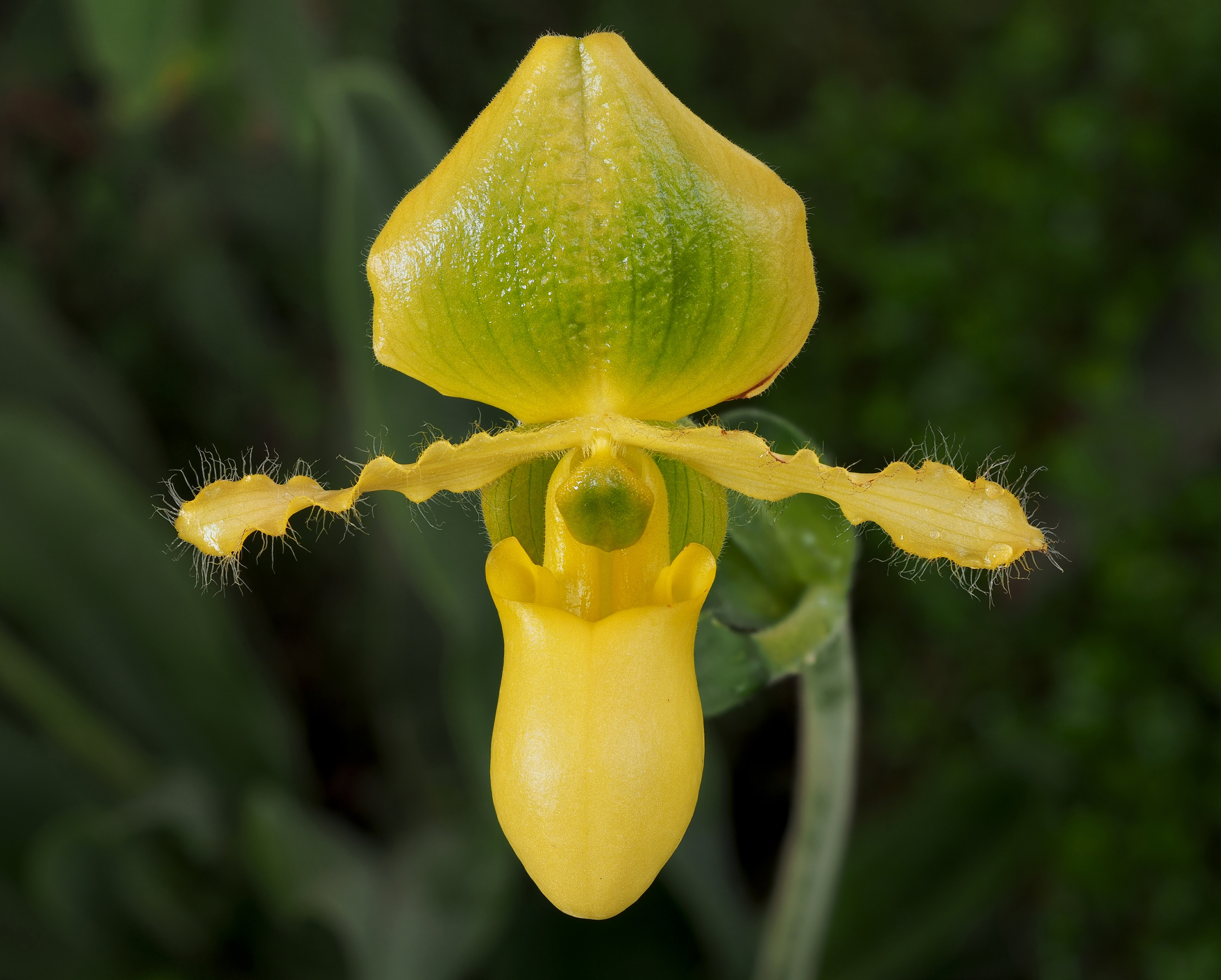
Paphiopedilum Pinocchio, hybrid of Paphiopedilum primulinum × Paphiopedilum glaucophyllum

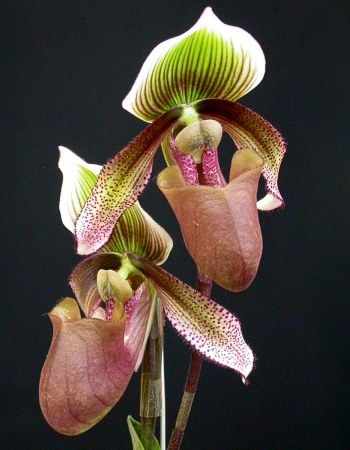
Paphiopedilum superbiens

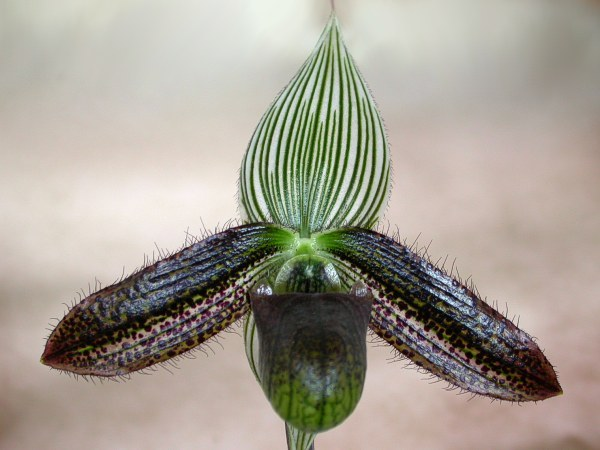
Paphiopedilum wardii

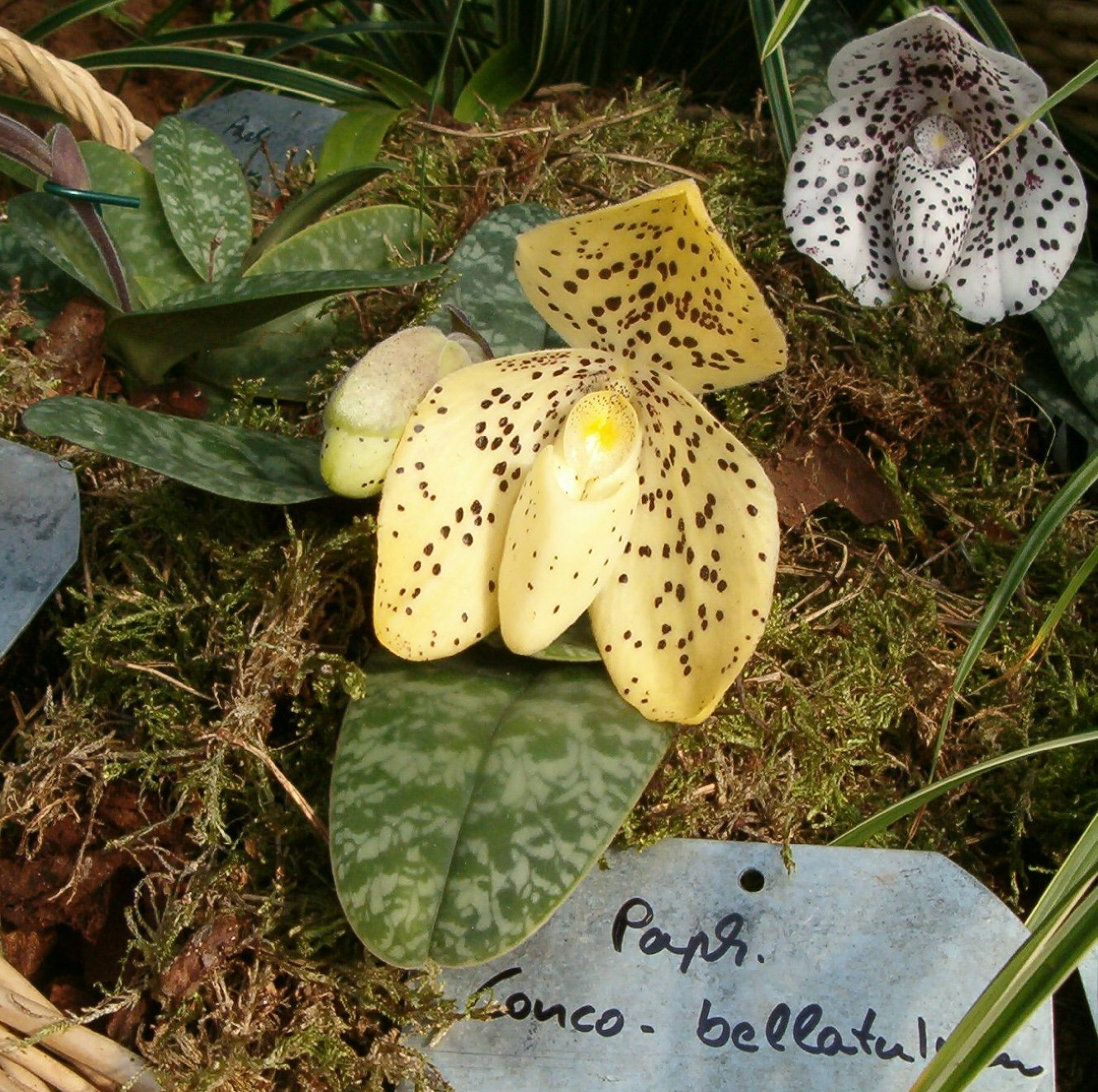
Paphiopedilum wenshanense (center)

The genus name Paphiopedilum was established by Ernst Hugo Heinrich Pfitzer in 1886; it is derived from Paphos (a city in Cyprus, a place sacred to Aphrodite. It was said she landed at the site when rose from the sea as her birth.) and Ancient Greek pedilon "slipper". No paphiopedilum occurs on Cyprus – at least not as the genus is understood today. But it was long mixed up with its Holarctic relative Cypripedium, which grows in the Mediterranean region. Paphiopedilum was made a valid taxon in 1959, but its use has become restricted to eastern Asian species in our time.

=== Subdivisions ===
The genus Paphiopedilum has been divided into several subgenera, and then further into sections and subsections:

- Subgenus Parvisepalum
- Subgenus Brachypetalum
- Subgenus Polyantha
  - Section Mastigopetalum
  - Section Polyantha
  - Section Mystropetalum
- Subgenus Paphiopedilum
  - Section Stictopetalum
  - Section Paphiopedilum
  - Section Ceratopetalum
  - Section Cymatopetalum
  - Section Thiopetalum
  - Section Laosianum
- Subgenus Sigmatopetalum
  - Section Spathopetalum
    - Subsection Macronidium
    - Subsection Spathopetalum
  - Section Blepharopetalum
  - Section Mastersianum
  - Section Punctatum
  - Section Barbata
    - Subsection Lorapetalum
    - Subsection Chloroneura
  - Section Planipetalum
  - Section Venustum
- Subgenus Cochlopetalum
- Subgenus Megastaminodium

=== Selected species ===
There are more than 550 taxa in this genus, including some 80 valid species. Some notable species and their natural hybrids are listed here, together with some assorted varieties and forms:

- Paphiopedilum acmodontum (Philippines)
- Paphiopedilum adductum
- Paphiopedilum × affine (P. appletonianum × P. villosum) (Vietnam)
- Paphiopedilum appletonianum (Hainan to Indochina)
- Paphiopedilum × areeanum (P. barbigerum × P. villosum var. annamense) (China: SE Yunnan)
- Paphiopedilum argus (Philippines: Luzon)
- Paphiopedilum armeniacum – Golden slipper orchid
  - Paphiopedilum armeniacum fma. markii
- Paphiopedilum barbatum – Penang slipper orchid (Peninsular Thailand to Sumatra)
- Paphiopedilum barbigerum
- Paphiopedilum bellatulum – Egg-in-a-nest orchid (SE Yunnan, Guizhou, S Guangxi to Indochina)
- Paphiopedilum bougainvilleanum (Solomon Islands)
  - Paphiopedilum bougainvilleanum var. bougainvilleanum (Solomon Islands: North Solomons)
  - Paphiopedilum bougainvilleanum var. saskianum (Solomon Islands: South Solomons)
- Paphiopedilum bullenianum (Malesia)
  - Paphiopedilum bullenianum var. bullenianum (W Malaysia)
  - Paphiopedilum bullenianum var. celebesense (Sulawesi to Maluku)
- Paphiopedilum × burbidgei (P. dayanum × P. javanicum var. virens) (Borneo)
- Paphiopedilum callosum (Indochina to NW Peninsular Malaysia)
  - Paphiopedilum callosum var. callosum (Indochina) (including f. albinum, P. viniferum)
  - Paphiopedilum callosum var. potentianum (Thailand)
  - Paphiopedilum callosum var. warnerianum (Peninsular Thailand to NW Peninsular Malaysia)
- Paphiopedilum canhii
- Paphiopedilum charlesworthii
- Paphiopedilum ciliolare
- Paphiopedilum concolor
- Paphiopedilum × cribbii Averyanov (S Vietnam)
- Paphiopedilum × dalatense (P. callosum × P. villosum var. annamense) (Vietnam)
- Paphiopedilum dayanum (Borneo)
- Paphiopedilum delenatii
- Paphiopedilum dianthum
- Paphiopedilum × dixlerianum (P. callosum × P. wardii) (Myanmar)
- Paphiopedilum druryi (S India)
- Paphiopedilum emersonii
- Paphiopedilum × expansum ( P. hennisianum × P. philippinense) (Philippines)
- Paphiopedilum exul (Peninsular Thailand)
- Paphiopedilum fairrieanum (E Himalaya to Assam)
- Paphiopedilum × fanaticum (P. malipoense × P. micranthum) (S China)
- Paphiopedilum fowliei
- Paphiopedilum × frankeanum (P. superbiens × P. tonsum) (Sumatra)
- Paphiopedilum gigantifolium (SC Sulawesi)
- Paphiopedilum glanduliferum (NW New Guinea)
- Paphiopedilum glaucophyllum
- Paphiopedilum godefroyae (Peninsular Thailand)
- Paphiopedilum gratrixianum
- Paphiopedilum × grussianum (P. dianthum × P. hirsutissimum var. esquirolei) (China: Guangxi)
- Paphiopedilum hangianum Perner & O.Gruss (Yunnan to Vietnam) (including f. album, P. singchii)
- Paphiopedilum haynaldianum (Philippines: Luzon, Negros)
- Paphiopedilum helenae Aver. (N Vietnam: Cao Bang Province) (includes P. delicatum)
- Paphiopedilum hennisianum (C Philippines)
- Paphiopedilum henryanum (SE Yunnan, Guangxi to N Vietnam)
- Paphiopedilum × herrmannii (P. helenae × P. hirsutissimum var. esquirolei) (Vietnam)
- Paphiopedilum hirsutissimum (Assam to S China)
  - Paphiopedilum hirsutissimum var. chiwuanum (China: Yunnan)
  - Paphiopedilum hirsutissimum var. esquirolei (Yunnan, Guizhou, Guangxi to N & E Indochina)
  - Paphiopedilum hirsutissimum var. hirsutissimum (Assam to Myanmar)
- Paphiopedilum hookerae (Borneo)
  - Paphiopedilum hookerae var. hookerae (Borneo: Sarawak, W. Kalimantan)
  - Paphiopedilum hookerae var. volonteanum (Borneo: Sabah)
- Paphiopedilum insigne (Assam: Meghalaya)
- Paphiopedilum intaniae (Sulawesi)
- Paphiopedilum javanicum (Sumatra, Borneo to Lesser Sunda Islands)
  - Paphiopedilum javanicum var. javanicum (Sumatra to Lesser Sunda Islands)
  - Paphiopedilum javanicum var. virens (Borneo: Sabah to N Sarawak)
- Paphiopedilum × kimballianum (P. dayanum × P. rothschildianum) (Borneo: Mt. Kinabalu)
- Paphiopedilum kolopakingii (Borneo: C Kalimantan)
- Paphiopedilum lawrenceanum (Borneo - Sarawak, Sabah)
- Paphiopedilum liemianum (N. Sumatra)
- Paphiopedilum × littleanum (P. dayanum × P. lawrenceanum) (Borneo)
- Paphiopedilum lowii (W & C Malesia)
  - Paphiopedilum lowii var. lowii (W & C Malaysia)
  - Paphiopedilum lowii var. lynniae (Borneo)
  - Paphiopedilum lowii var. richardianum (Sulawesi)
- Paphiopedilum malipoense – Jade slipper orchid (including P. jackii)
- Paphiopedilum mastersianum (Lesser Sunda Islands to Maluku)
  - Paphiopedilum mastersianum var. mastersianum (Maluku: Ambon, Buru)
  - Paphiopedilum mastersianum var. mohrianum (Lesser Sunda Islands: Flores)
- Paphiopedilum × mattesii (P. barbatum × P. bullenianum) (Peninsular Malaysia)
- Paphiopedilum micranthum – Silver slipper orchid, hard-leaved pocket orchid
  - Paphiopedilum micranthum var. eburneum
  - Paphiopedilum micranthum var. glanzeanum (Albinistic form)
- Paphiopedilum niveum (Peninsular Thailand to N Peninsular Malaysia)
- Paphiopedilum ooii Koop.; Borneo (Sabah)
- Paphiopedilum papilio-laoticus Schuit., Luang Aphay & Iio; Laos
- Paphiopedilum papuanum (New Guinea)
- Paphiopedilum parishii (Assam to W Yunnan)
- Paphiopedilum × pereirae (P. exul × P. niveum) (Peninsular Thailand)
- Paphiopedilum × petchleungianum (P. dianthum × P. villosum) (China: SE Yunnan)
- Paphiopedilum philippinense (Philippines to N Borneo)
  - Paphiopedilum philippinense var. philippinense (Philippines to N Borneo)
  - Paphiopedilum philippinense var. roebelenii (Philippines: Luzon)
- Paphiopedilum × powellii (P. callosum × P. exul) (Peninsular Thailand)
- Paphiopedilum × pradhanii (P. fairrieanum × P. venustum) (E Himalaya)
- Paphiopedilum primulinum (Sumatra: S Aceh)
  - Paphiopedilum primulinum var. primulinum
  - Paphiopedilum primulinum var. purpurascens
- Paphiopedilum purpuratum (S China to Hainan)
  - Paphiopedilum purpuratum var. hainanense (Hainan)
  - Paphiopedilum purpuratum var. purpuratum (China: Yunnan, Hong Kong, Guangdong)
- Paphiopedilum randsii (Philippines: N Mindanao)
- Paphiopedilum rhizomatosum (Myanmar)
- Paphiopedilum robinsonianum (Central Sulawesi)
- Paphiopedilum rothschildianum (NW Borneo on ultramafic soil)
- Paphiopedilum rungsuriyanum (Laos)
- Paphiopedilum saccopetalum (China: SE Guanxi)
- Paphiopedilum sanderianum (NW Borneo: Gunung Mulu)
- Paphiopedilum sangii (N Sulawesi)
- Paphiopedilum schoseri (Sulawesi to Maluku)
- Paphiopedilum × shipwayae (P. dayanum × P. hookerae). (Borneo)
- Paphiopedilum × siamense (P. appletonianum × P. callosum) (Thailand)
- Paphiopedilum spicerianum
- Paphiopedilum × spicerovenustum (P. spiceranum × P. venustum) (Assam)
- Paphiopedilum stonei (Borneo: Sarawak)
  - Paphiopedilum stonei var. platyphyllum (Borneo: Sarawak)
  - Paphiopedilum stonei var. stonei (Borneo: S Sarawak)
- Paphiopedilum sugiyamanum (Borneo: Sabah)
- Paphiopedilum sukhakulii (NE Thailand)
- Paphiopedilum supardii (Borneo: SE Kalimantan)
- Paphiopedilum superbiens (N & W Sumatra)
- Paphiopedilum thaianum (Thailand)
- Paphiopedilum tigrinum (including P. smaragdinum)
- Paphiopedilum tonsum (Rchb.f.) Stein (N & W Sumatra) (including f. alboviride)
- Paphiopedilum tranlienianum (Vietnam)
  - Paphiopedilum tranlienianum f. alboviride (Vietnam)
- Paphiopedilum urbanianum
- Paphiopedilum usitanum (Philippines)
- Paphiopedilum vejvarutianum (Thailand: Kanchanaburi)
- Paphiopedilum × venustoinsigne (P. insigne × P. venustum) (Assam)
- Paphiopedilum venustum (E Nepal to NE Bangladesh)
- Paphiopedilum victoria-mariae (W Sumatra)
- Paphiopedilum victoria-regina (including P. chamberlainianum)
- Paphiopedilum × vietenryanum (P. gratrixianum × P. henryanum) (China: Yunnan)
- Paphiopedilum vietnamense Gruss & Perner (Vietnam)
- Paphiopedilum villosum (Assam to S China)
  - Paphiopedilum villosum var. annamense (Yunnan and Guangxi to Indochina)
  - Paphiopedilum villosum var. boxallii (Myanmar)
  - Paphiopedilum villosum var. villosum (Assam to Thailand) (including P. densissimum)
- Paphiopedilum violascens (N & E New Guinea, Manus Island)
- Paphiopedilum wardii Summerh. – Rainbow orchid (SW Yunnan to Myanmar) (including f. alboviride)
  - Paphiopedilum wardii var. teestaensis (China: SW Yunnan)
- Paphiopedilum × wenshanense (P. bellatulum × P. concolor, including P. × conco-bellatulum)
- Paphiopedilum wentworthianum (Solomon Islands)
- Paphiopedilum wilhelminae (C New Guinea)

== Conservation ==
All Paphiopedilum species are listed under Appendix I of the Convention on International Trade in Endangered Species (CITES), meaning that commercial international trade in wild-sourced specimens is prohibited, while non-commercial trade is regulated.

== See also ==
- × Phragmipaphium, hybrids between Paphiopedilum and Phragmipedium
