= Paphiopedilum bougainvilleanum =

Conservation status
- Critically Endangered (IUCN 3.1)

Scientific classification
- Kingdom: Plantae
- Clade: Tracheophytes
- Clade: Angiosperms
- Clade: Monocots
- Order: Asparagales
- Family: Orchidaceae
- Subfamily: Cypripedioideae
- Genus: Paphiopedilum
- Species: P. bougainvilleanum

Binomial name
- Paphiopedilum bougainvilleanum Stiles & Fowlie (1971)

Synonyms
- Paphiopedilum violascens var. bougainvilleanum (Fowlie) Koop.

Species of plant

Paphiopedilum bougainvilleanum or the Bougainville paphiopedilum is a species of slipper orchid endemic to Bougainville and the Solomon Islands. This slipper orchid is rare among enthusiasts, and is difficult to cultivate.

== Taxonomy ==
It was originally described by Stiles and Fowlie in the Orchid Digest in 1971, with its epithet referring to its natural habitat in Bougainville. P. bougainvilleanum is closely similar to P. violascens, and is sometimes referred to as a variant of P. violascens, as described by Koop in 1995.

== Description ==
P. bougainvilleanum grows on forest floors or on trees in wet montane forests over granite, with leaf litter, humus or mosses as medium for growth. The orchid consists of 5 to 7 leaves measuring 14–22 centimetres (5.5–8.7 in) long and 2–5 centimetres (0.79–1.97 in) wide, with its upper surface being generally pale green, but faintly mottled with dark green. Its pale green inflorescence has a purple-white pubescent and measures 10–23 centimetres (3.9–9.1 in) long, consisting of a single flower around 5 centimetres (2.0 in) wide. Peak flowering occurs in late spring and late fall.

== Distribution ==
P. bougainvilleanum is endemic to Bougainville and throughout the Solomon Islands, where it grows in elevations of 1,150–1,850 metres (3,770–6,070 ft) and a mean temperature range of 17–18 °C (63–64 °F).

== Conservation ==
Cribb in 1986 described P. bougainvilleanum as a generally endangered fauna due to over-collecting. IUCN in 2015 designated it as critically endangered due to harvesting and local development.
