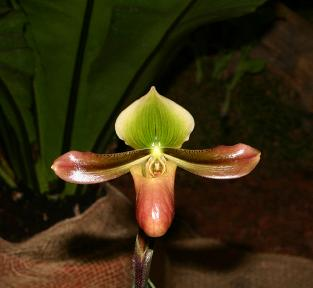
- Flower of Paphiopedilum mastersianum

Scientific classification
- Kingdom: Plantae
- Clade: Tracheophytes
- Clade: Angiosperms
- Clade: Monocots
- Order: Asparagales
- Family: Orchidaceae
- Subfamily: Cypripedioideae
- Genus: Paphiopedilum
- Species: P. mastersianum

Binomial name
- Paphiopedilum mastersianum (Rchb.f.) Stein

Synonyms
- Cypripedium mastersianum Rchb.f. (basionym); Cordula mastersiana (Rchb.f.) Rolfe

= Paphiopedilum mastersianum =

Species of orchid

Paphiopedilum mastersianum is a species of orchid occurring from the Lesser Sunda Islands to Maluku.
