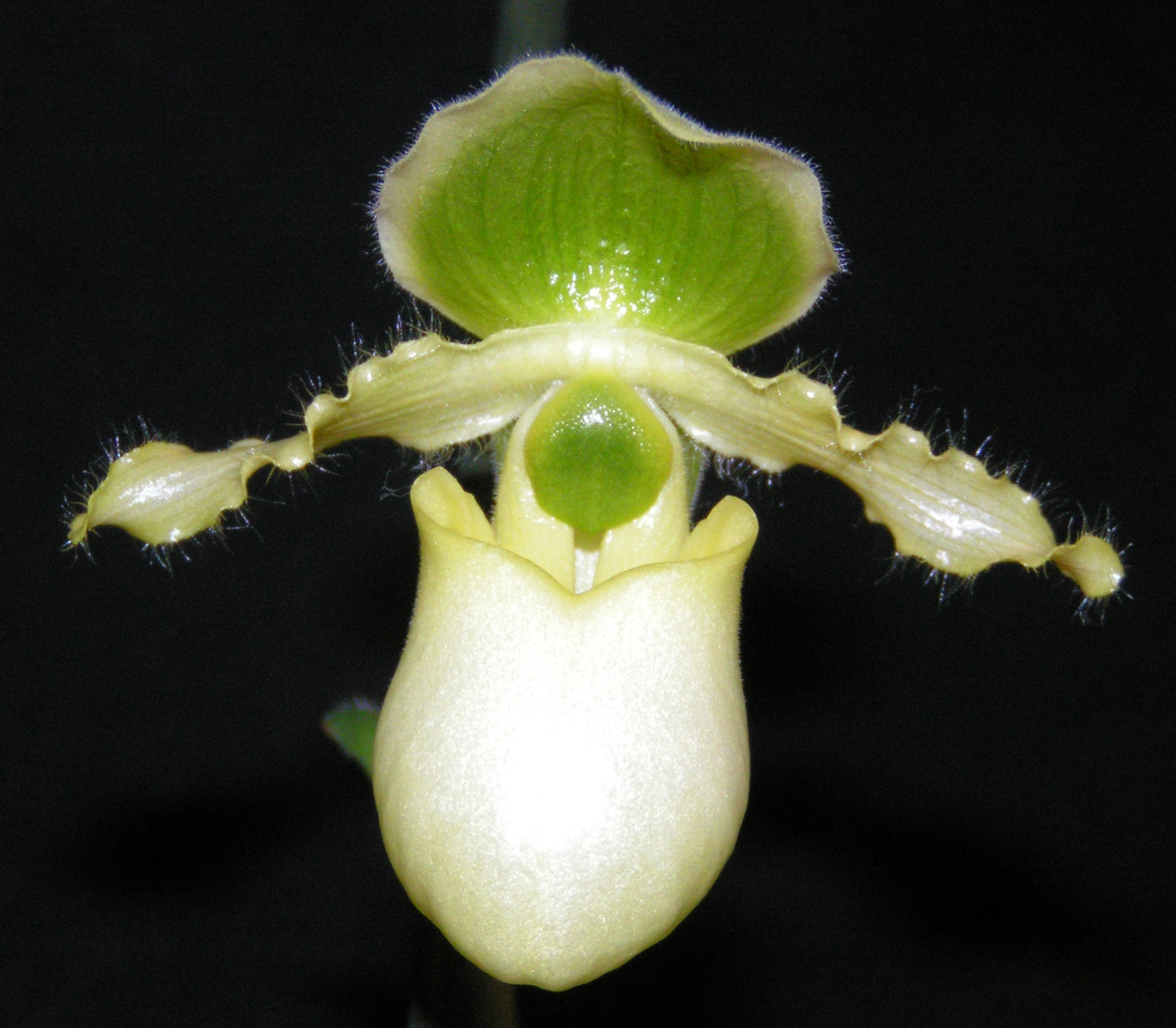
- Flower of Paphiopedilum primulinum

Scientific classification
- Kingdom: Plantae
- Clade: Tracheophytes
- Clade: Angiosperms
- Clade: Monocots
- Order: Asparagales
- Family: Orchidaceae
- Subfamily: Cypripedioideae
- Genus: Paphiopedilum
- Species: P. primulinum

Binomial name
- Paphiopedilum primulinum M.W.Wood & P.Taylor

Synonyms
- Paphiopedilum chamberlainianum f. primulinum (M.W.Wood & P.Taylor) Fowlie; Paphiopedilum victoria-regina ssp. primulinum (M.W.Wood & P.Taylor) M.W.Wood; Paphiopedilum liemianum var. primulinum (M.W.Wood & P.Taylor) K.Karas. & K.Saito; Paphiopedilum chamberlainianum var. primulinum (M.W.Wood & P.Taylor) Braem

= Paphiopedilum primulinum =

Species of orchid

Paphiopedilum primulinum is a species of orchid endemic to Sumatra (southern Aceh). It is endangered and high demand as it is a sequential blooming plant (ever-bloomer). It requires high indirect sunlight and should be water often before the soil dries out.
