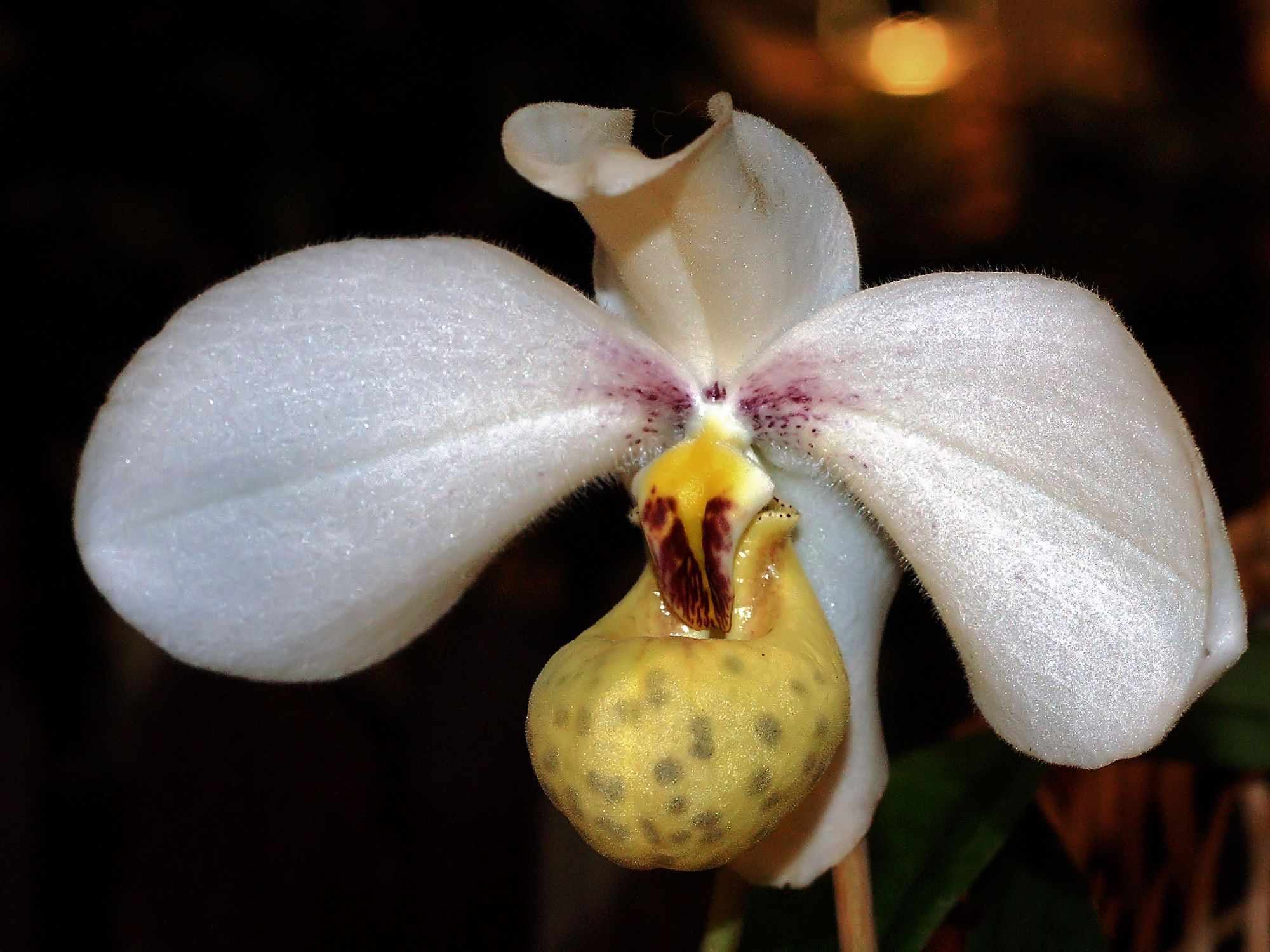

Conservation status
- Critically Endangered (IUCN 3.1)

Scientific classification
- Kingdom: Plantae
- Clade: Tracheophytes
- Clade: Angiosperms
- Clade: Monocots
- Order: Asparagales
- Family: Orchidaceae
- Subfamily: Cypripedioideae
- Genus: Paphiopedilum
- Species: P. emersonii

Binomial name
- Paphiopedilum emersonii Koop. & P.J.Cribb

= Paphiopedilum emersonii =

Species of orchid

Paphiopedilum emersonii, described in 1982, is a species of orchid named after American orchid enthusiast Emerson 'Doc' Charles. The plant blooms from late spring to early summer with one to two flowers per an infloresensce. The plant size is small when compared to other Paphiopedilums. Flowers are fragrant.

== Distribution ==
Paphiopedilum emersonii is found in northern Vietnam and in Guangxi, southeastern Yunnan and southern Guangdong provinces of China. It is found in rocks, sandstone, and clay on mossy cliffs in elevations of 460 to 750 meters. The area is subjected to dryness from late fall to spring with slight fog and drizzle. In the summer, there they are subjected to heavy rain.

== Culture ==
Keep plant in a moderately bright area with cool to intermediate temperatures from 45F to 90F. To induce blooming reduce watering for 3 to 4 weeks during the winter. Keep humidity at 60 to 80%. The plant is easy to flower. Pot in a mix of bark, perlite, and charcoal. Variations including coconut husk chips are also used.

== Varieties/forms ==
- Paphiopedilum emersonii var. album yellow dorsal sepal and peach lip
- Paphiopedilum emersonii f./var. luteum yellow petals, yellow dorsal sepal, and yellow lip. Found in southeastern Yunnan.
