= Gustav Wallis =

German plant collector (1830-1878)

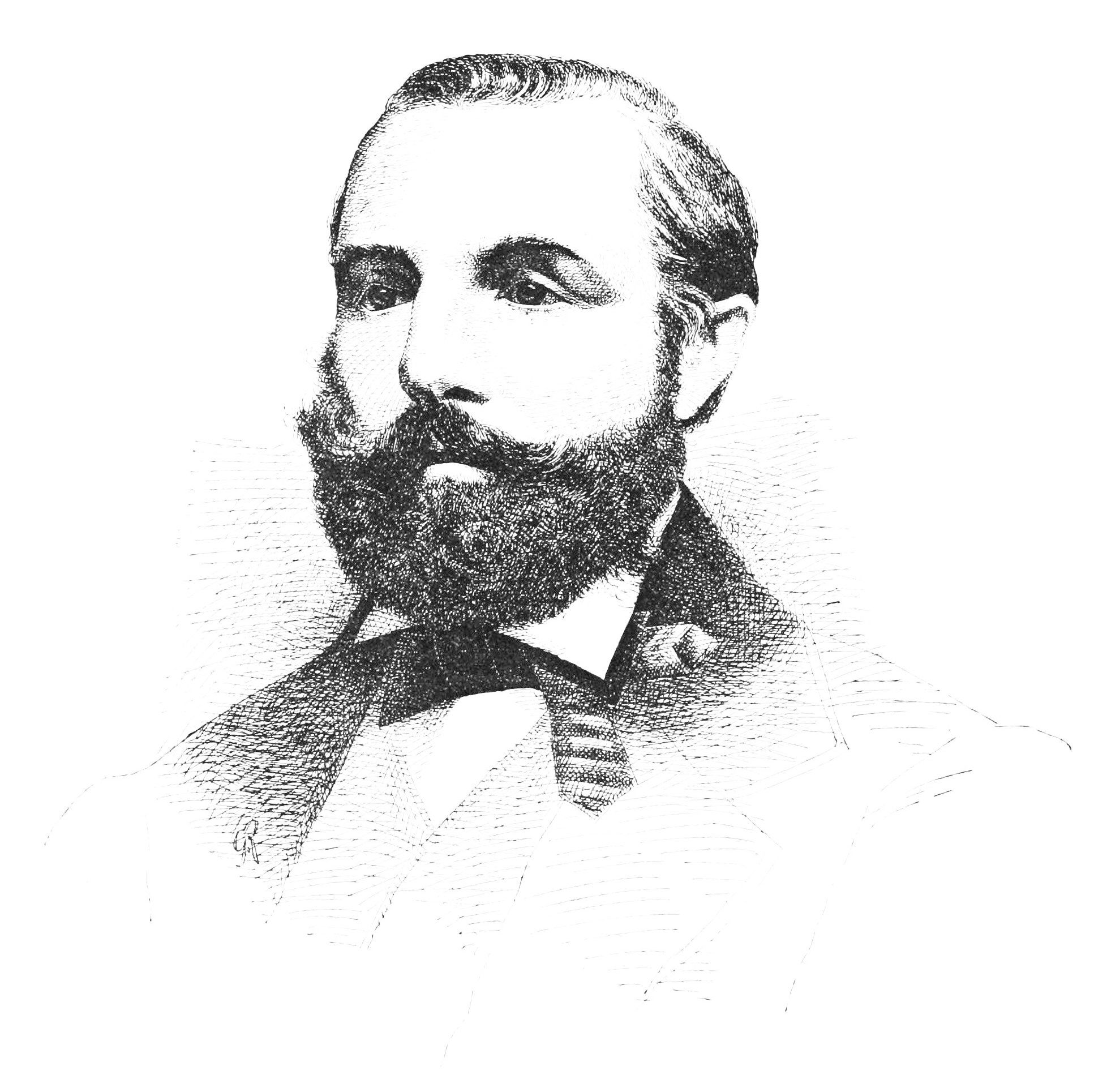
- Born: 1 May 1830; Lüneburg
- Died: 20 June 1878
- Known for: plant collection
- Scientific career
- Fields: Botany
- Workplaces: L'Horticulture Internationale, James Veitch & Sons
- Author abbrev. (botany): Wallis

Gustav Wallis (1 May 1830 – 20 June 1878) was a German plant collector who introduced over 1,000 plant species to Europe, many of which were named after him. He was particularly focused on orchid hunting during the Victorian orchid craze, but also was the first European collector of plants such as large-leaved Anthurium specimens that continue to be among the most sought after today.

== Early life ==
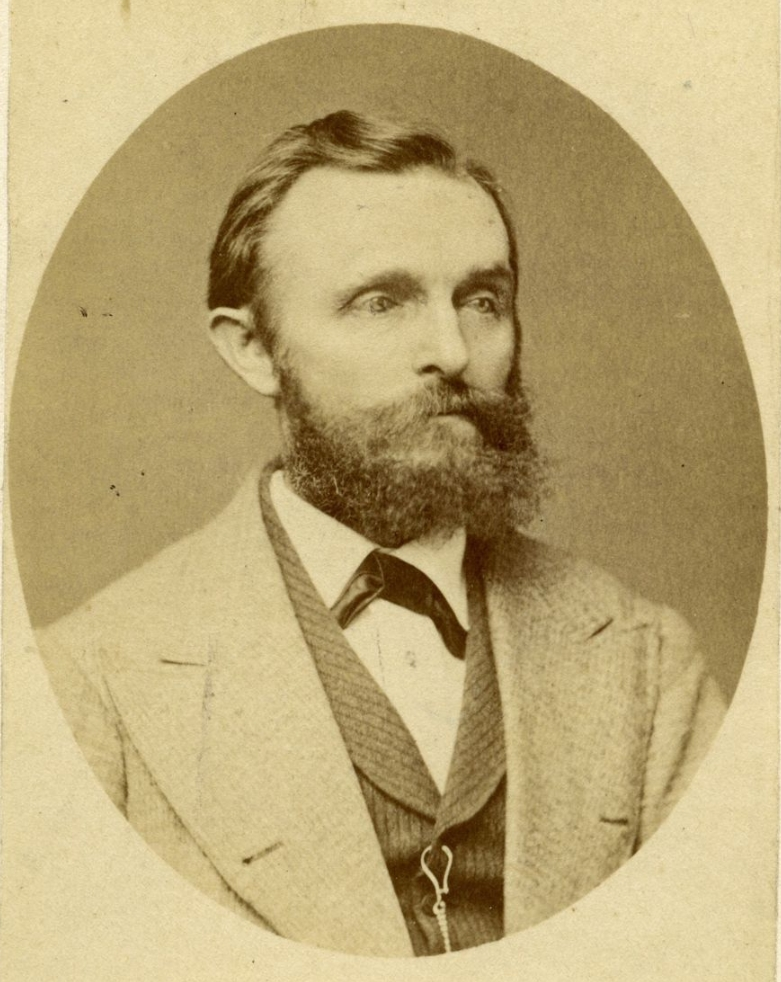
Carte-de-visite

Wallis was born in Lüneburg, in Lower Saxony, Germany, where his father was an advocate. Wallis was deaf and mute until six years of age, and it was not until 1836 that he was able to talk. As a consequence, he suffered from a speech defect during his entire life.

In about 1836 his father died, leaving his mother a widow with six children. With no means of support, she found it necessary to leave Lüneburg and move to Detmold, her native town. It was here that Wallis attended school and, in the surrounding mountains and forests, developed the love of nature and botany which later gave him the desire to travel abroad and visit the tropics. As a youth, Wallis had great energy and an indomitable will, and despite his speech impediment he acquired considerable proficiency in foreign languages, an accomplishment which stood him in good stead during the course of his career.

At the age of sixteen he was apprenticed to a goldsmith but, disliking the work, he quit and took an apprenticeship with a gardener at Detmold. At the end of his apprenticeship, he obtained employment in Munich, from where he often visited the Alps to collect and study plants.

In 1856, Wallis went to southern Brazil, where he set up a horticultural establishment for a German firm but, following the bankruptcy of the parent company, the branch was forced to close and Wallis was left practically penniless.

== Jean Linden ==
In 1858, he was engaged as a plant-collector by Jean Linden’s orchid company, L’Horticulture Internationale, of Brussels. Wallis then began a hazardous journey, crossing the continent of South America, starting at the mouth of the River Amazon and traversing the total length to its source, exploring the river and many of its more important tributaries.

In 1866, Wallis was exploring the low-lying areas where the Rio Negro meets the Amazon, when he came across an unknown Cattleya species growing among the branches of macucus trees. Wallis was able to send a large shipment to Linden, who named the new species Cattleya eldorado, and the following year had more than 700 plants of the new species in bloom on display in Paris.

== James Veitch & Sons ==
In 1870, he was engaged by James Veitch & Sons, of Chelsea, London, who sent him to the Philippines to search for orchids of the Phalaenopsis species which were indigenous to those islands. Although he was able to make sufficient finds to send a shipment back to England, including Paphiopedilum argus, P. haynaldianum, Dendrobium amethystoglossum and Lilium philippinense, the mission proved too expensive to be considered a success and Wallis had to be recalled.

In December 1872, he was sent to Colombia, where he had explored previously, returning in 1874 with many finds, including two giant-leaved Anthuriums, A. veitchii and A. warocqueanum, as well as several interesting and valuable orchids, including various species of Masdevallia.

== Later career and death ==
His contract with Veitch was terminated in 1874, but he continued to collect plants in South America at his own expense, commencing his last journey at the end of the summer of 1875, when he left to explore the northern and central regions of the continent. Whilst in Colombia, he discovered Zamia wallisii but his samples were lost; it was only in the 1980s that the plant was re-located.

He was next heard of in Panama, dangerously ill with yellow fever and malaria. He recovered from his illness and was able to re-commence work, but his second attack, combined with dysentery, proved fatal. His last letter was dated Cuenca, Ecuador, 24 March 1878, where, according to the collector Edward Klaboch, Wallis died in hospital on 20 June.

== Honours ==
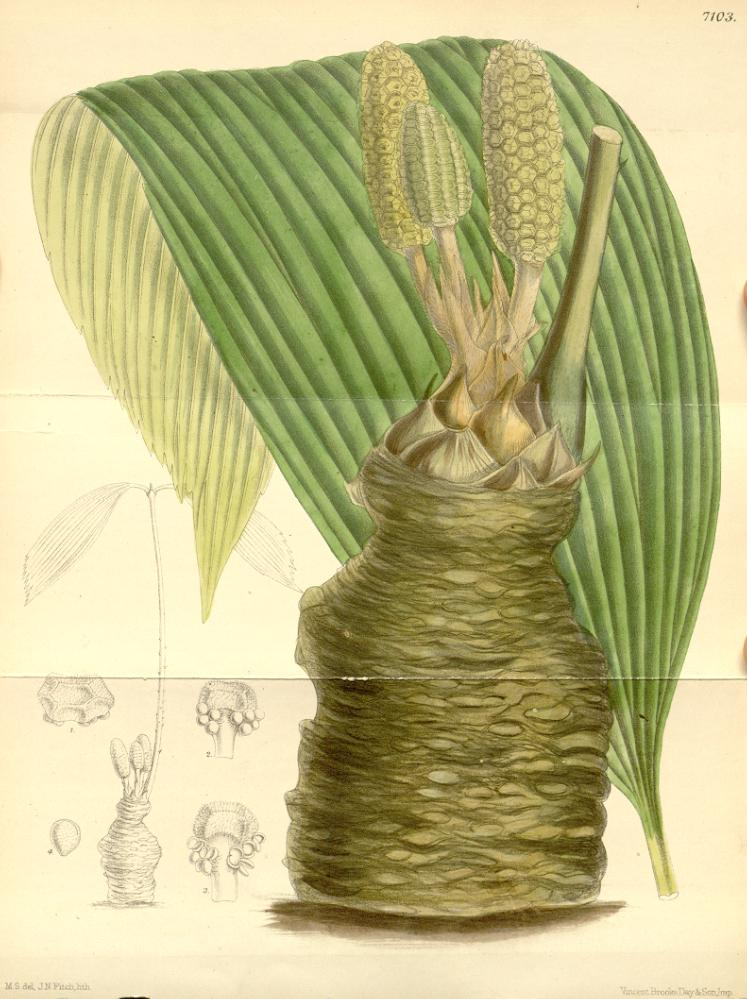
Zamia wallisii

Amongst the plants named after Wallis are:

- Anthurium wallisii
- Batemannia wallisii
- Calathea wallisii
- Dieffenbachia seguine subvar. wallisii
- Dracula wallisii
- Epidendrum wallisii
- Grammatophyllum wallisii
- Homalomena wallisii
- Houlletia wallisii
- Masdevallia wallisii
- Odontoglossum wallisii
- Spathiphyllum wallisii
- Stenospermation wallisii
- Wallisia, (genus, family Bromeliaceae)
- Zamia wallisii
