= Grammatophyllum speciosum =

Scientific classification
- Kingdom: Plantae
- Clade: Tracheophytes
- Clade: Angiosperms
- Clade: Monocots
- Order: Asparagales
- Family: Orchidaceae
- Subfamily: Epidendroideae
- Genus: Grammatophyllum
- Species: G. speciosum

Binomial name
- Grammatophyllum speciosum Blume

Synonyms
- Grammatophyllum fastuosum Lindl.; Grammatophyllum giganteum Blume ex Rchb.f.; Grammatophyllum macranthum (Wight) Rchb.f.; Pattonia macrantha Wight

Species of orchid

Grammatophyllum speciosum, also called giant orchid, tiger orchid, sugar cane orchid or queen of the orchids, is a species of orchid native to Laos, Myanmar, Thailand, Vietnam, Borneo, Indonesia (Sumatra, Java, Sulawesi) and Malaysia. It has also been recorded in the Philippines, New Guinea and the Solomon Islands.

== Description ==
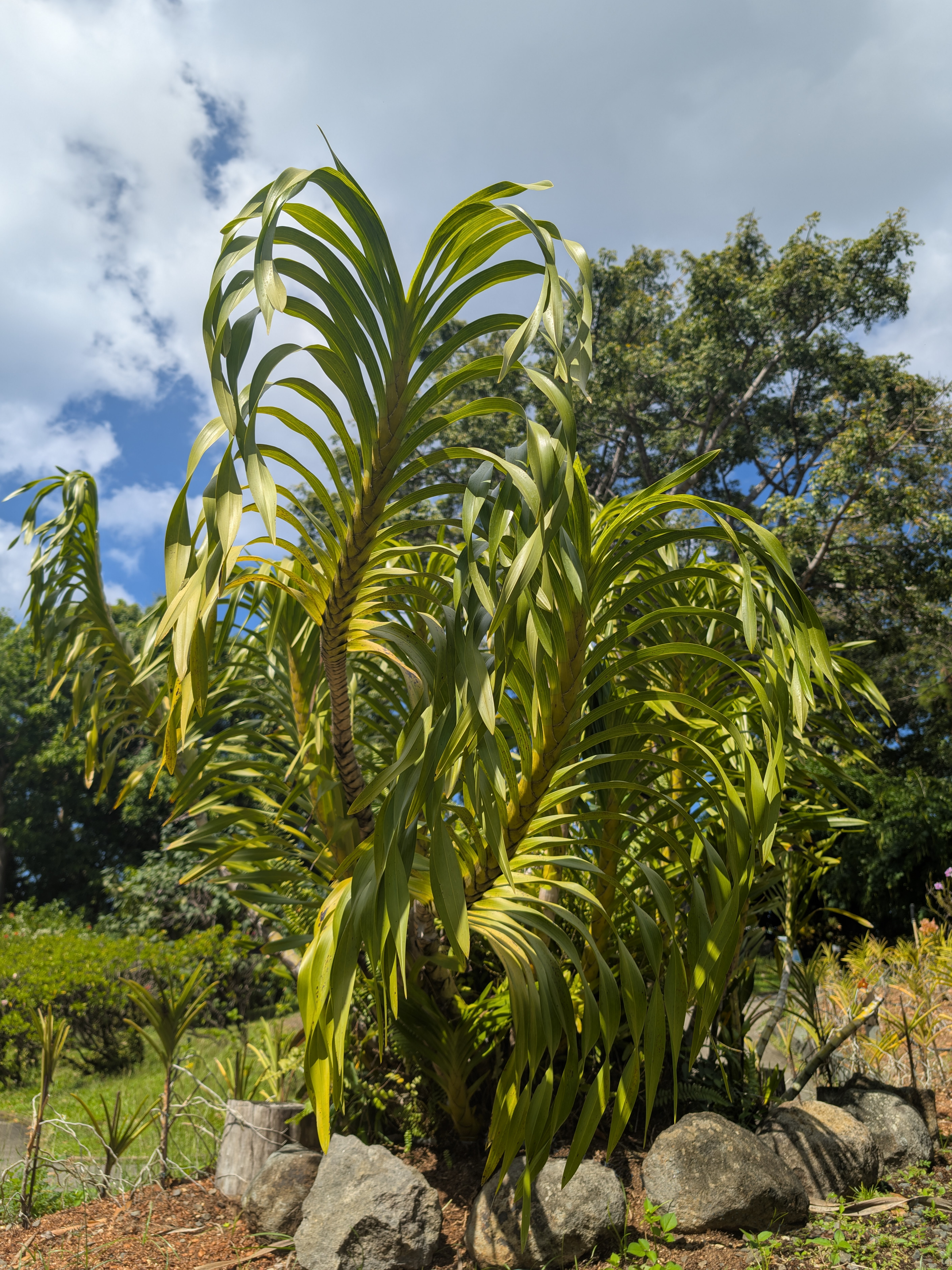
Grammatophyllum speciousum in the Jardin botanique de Deshaies, Guadeloupe.

It is an epiphytic and occasionally a lithophytic plant, forming spectacular root bundles. Its cylindric pseudobulbs can grow to a length of 2.5 m. It can grow to gigantic clusters weighing from several hundred kilograms to more than one tonne. One collected in 1893 by Frederick K. Sander & Co. near Penang Island in Malaysia weighed 1 t (0.98 long tons; 1.1 short tons). Half was sent to the Columbian Exhibition in Chicago and the other half to the Singapore Botanic Garden. By 1902, the Singapore specimen had grown to be 14.4 m (47 ft) girth by 3 m (9.8 ft) high, and bore simultaneously 2,090 12.5 cm (4.9 in) wide gold and mahogany-coloured flowers plus 1110 unopened buds. Much more recently, in A.D. 2000, biologists Tim Laman and Phil Atkinson found one in Borneo 7.7 m (25 ft) wide and bearing between 2500 and 5000 flowers. The plant completely encircled the host tree 46 m (151 ft) above the ground. The oldest known individual orchid plant is also a G. speciosum. Planted in the Singapore Botanic Garden in 1861 by Garden Director Lawrence Niven and his staff, it was 154 years old in 2015. The plant is also 5 m (16 ft) in width.

Each raceme can grow to a height of 3 m, bearing up to 80 flowers, each 10 cm wide. The flowers are yellow with maroon or dark red spots. These flowers are unusual, since the lowest flowers have no lip and these flowers function as osmophores for the entire inflorescence and continue to emit chemical scent to attract pollinators as flowers open in succession. It blooms only once every two to four years. This orchid can, however, remain in bloom for up to two months. Each individual flower can remain fresh for as long as six weeks. In addition, this plant has been found to have potential medicinal benefits; for example one research article by Harikarnpakdee and Chowjarean found it specifically aided in wound healing in humans.

== Common names ==
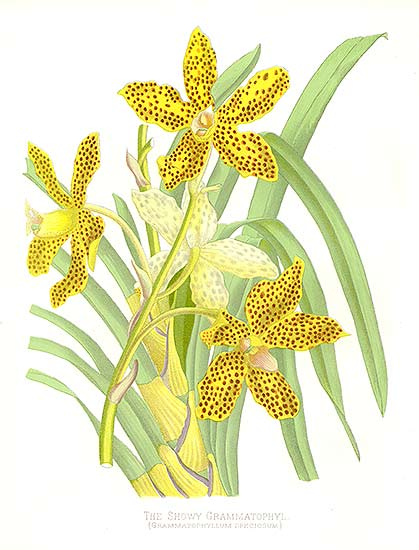
Illustration

- Giant orchid, not to be confused with Eulophia ecristata or Barlia robertiana, both of which are also commonly called the giant orchid.
- Tiger orchid, not to be confused with Rossioglossum grande or Maxillaria species, both are also called tiger orchid.
- Queen of the orchids, not to be confused with Cattleya species
- Sugar cane orchid, for its resemblance to a sugarcane plant of the genus Saccharum

== Distribution and habitat ==
It is native to New Guinea, Thailand, Indonesia, Malaysia and Philippines, growing in crotches of large trees on exposed areas of the lowland tropical rainforest.

== Ecology ==
A giant orchid weighing two tons was one of the highlights in the 1851 exhibition at the Crystal Palace in London.

Because of its enormous size, it is rarely cultivated as this species is usually too large to be accommodated in most greenhouses. Cultivated specimens of this species are always grown as terrestrials, as the plants grow as both an epiphyte and terrestrial in habitat.
