= Lizard orchid (disambiguation) =

Lizard orchid, Himantoglossum hircinum, is a species of orchid found across Europe.

Lizard orchid may also refer to:

- Burnettia cuneata, found in Australia
- Himantoglossum adriaticum, Adriatic lizard orchid
