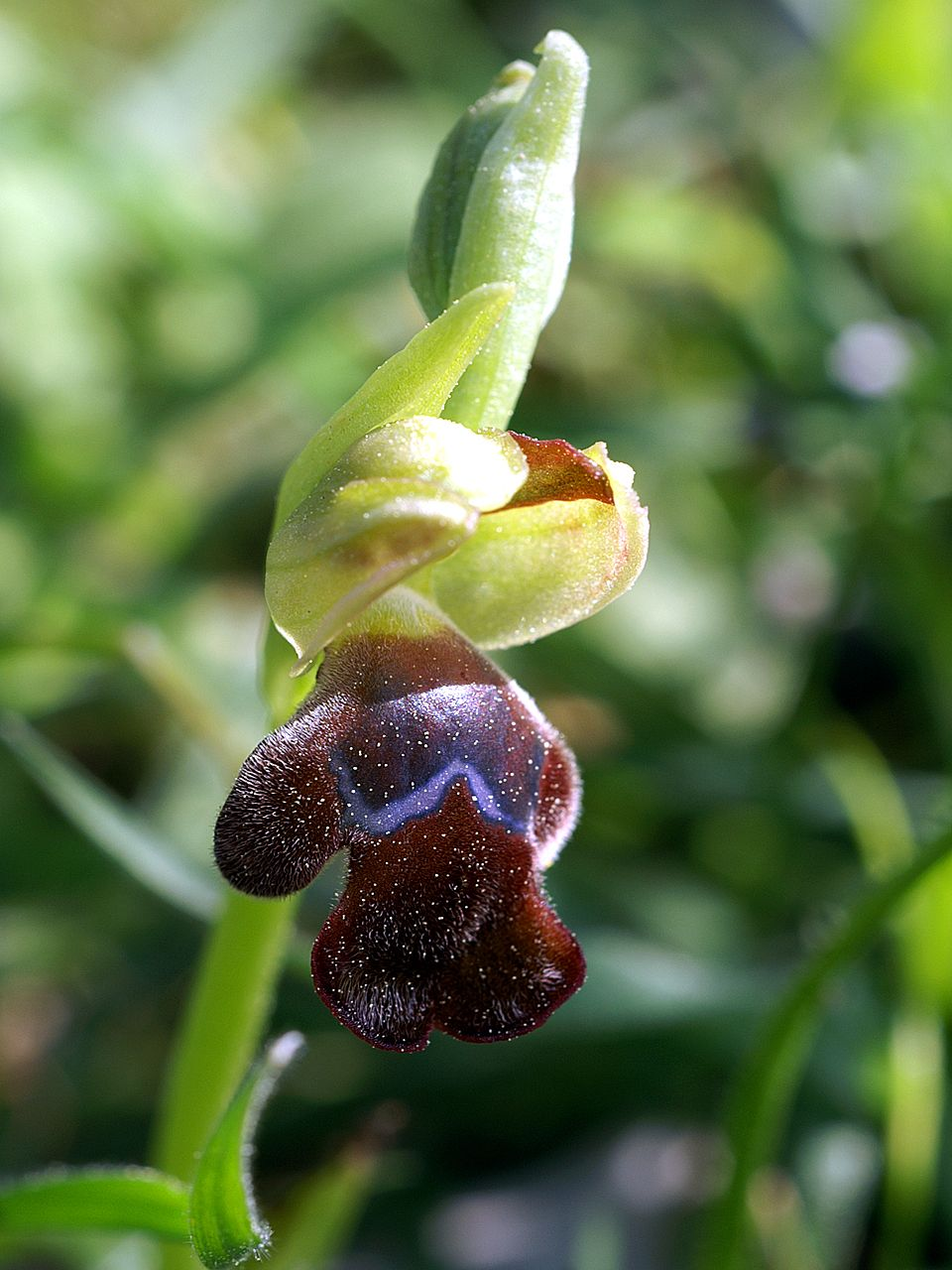
- Flower of Ophrys omegaifera

Scientific classification
- Kingdom: Plantae
- Clade: Tracheophytes
- Clade: Angiosperms
- Clade: Monocots
- Order: Asparagales
- Family: Orchidaceae
- Subfamily: Orchidoideae
- Genus: Ophrys
- Species: O. omegaifera

Binomial name
- Ophrys omegaifera H.Fleischm.

Synonyms
- Ophrys lutea subsp. omegaifera (H.Fleischm.) Soó.; Ophrys fusca subsp. omegaifera (H.Fleischm.) E.Nelson

= Ophrys omegaifera =

Omega bee-orchid

Species of orchid

Ophrys omegaifera, the omega bee-orchid, is a species of orchid native to the Mediterranean region from Portugal and Morocco to Syria.

== Subspecies and varieties ==
Numerous subspecific and varietal names have been proposed. As of December 2023, Plants of the World Online accepted the following:

- Ophrys omegaifera var. basilissa (C.Alibertis, A.Alibertis & H.R.Reinhard) Faurh - Greece
- Ophrys omegaifera subsp. dyris (Maire) Del Prete - Spain, Portugal, Morocco, Balearic Islands
- Ophrys omegaifera subsp. fleischmannii (Hayek) Del Prete - Crete and other Greek islands
- Ophrys omegaifera subsp. hayekii (H.Fleischm. & Soó) Kreutz - Sicily, Algeria, Tunisia
- Ophrys omegaifera subsp. israelitica (H.Baumann & Künkele) G.Morschek & K.Morschek - Palestine region, Lebanon-Syria, Turkey, Cyprus, Greece
- Ophrys omegaifera subsp. omegaifera (synonyms include Ophrys apollonae Paulus & M.Hirth) - Turkey, Greek islands
