= Comperia =

Comperia may refer to:

- Comperia (plant), a flowering plant genus in the family Orchidaceae
- Comperia (wasp), a wasp genus in the family Encyrtidae
