= Giant orchid =

Giant orchid is a common name for several plants and may refer to:

- Grammatophyllum speciosum, native from New Guinea to the Philippines and one of the world's largest orchids
- Eulophia ecristata, native to the southeastern United States
- Himantoglossum robertianum, native to the Mediterranean basin
