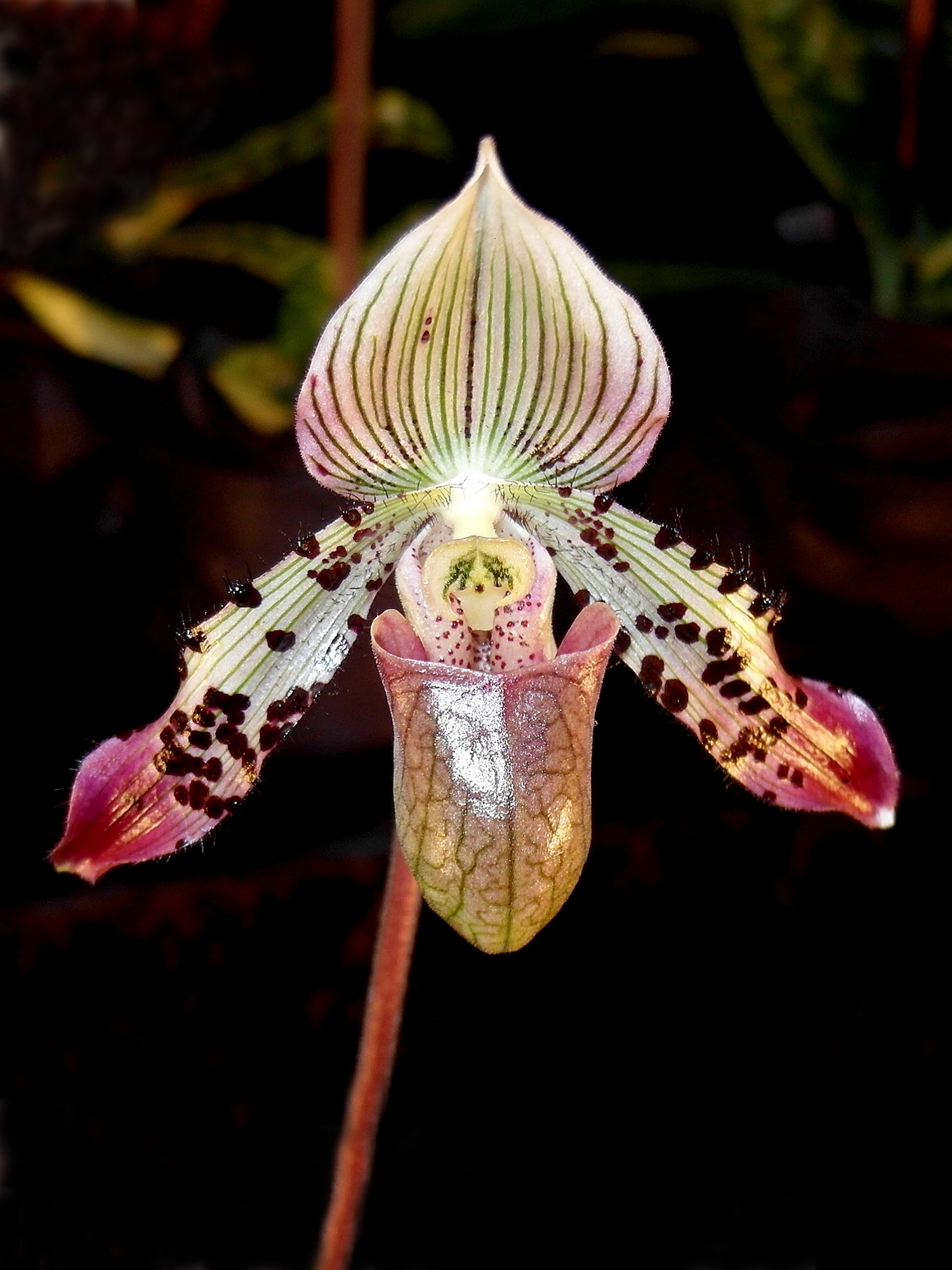

Scientific classification
- Kingdom: Plantae
- Clade: Tracheophytes
- Clade: Angiosperms
- Clade: Monocots
- Order: Asparagales
- Family: Orchidaceae
- Subfamily: Cypripedioideae
- Genus: Paphiopedilum
- Species: P. argus

Binomial name
- Paphiopedilum argus (Rchb.f.) Stein

Synonyms
- Cypripedium argus Rchb.f. (basionym); Cypripedium moensianum auct.; Cypripedium pitcherianum Manda; Cypripedium moensii auct.; Cordula argus (Rchb.f.) Rolfe; Paphiopedilum sriwanae Koop.; Paphiopedilum argus var. sriwanae (Koop.) O.Gruss

= Paphiopedilum argus =

Species of orchid

Paphiopedilum argus is a species of orchid endemic to Luzon Island of the Philippines. Various hybrids are cultivated involving P. argus.

== Taxonomy ==
The orchid was first described by Reichenbach in 1873 as Cypripedium argus, with Hooker in 1875 described it as the "very near ally" of C. barbatum (now P. barbatum), being distinguished by its larger size and its apparent purple spots on the petals, along with its accuminate upper sepal. It was later reclassified to Paphiopedilum by Berthold Stein through his work, Stein's Orchideenbuch, in 1892. The epithet refers to the many-eyed Ancient Greek giant, Argus, referring to the spots on its petals.

== Description ==
P. argus is a medium-sized, semi-terrestrial slipper orchid. It consists of 3 to 5 leaves, each measuring 9–24 centimetres (3.5–9.4 in) long and 2–5 centimetres (0.79–1.97 in) wide, with the upper surface being green with dark green mottling, while the below surface is purple-spotted at its base. Its purple-green, shortly pubescent inflorescence, measuring 30–45 centimetres (12–18 in) consists of a single flower 6–8 centimetres (2.4–3.1 in) wide, and is quite variable, with the petals having distinctive purple spots with some being ocellated. Peak flowering occurs in March and April, with growth time to maximum height is 2–5 years.

== Distribution ==
P. argus is endemic to the western part of Luzon in the Philippines in elevations of 1,150–1,600 metres (3,770–5,250 ft), where it grows on leaf litter, humus, and mosses, along volcanic ridges under low forests, with a mean temperature range of 17–20 °C (63–68 °F).
