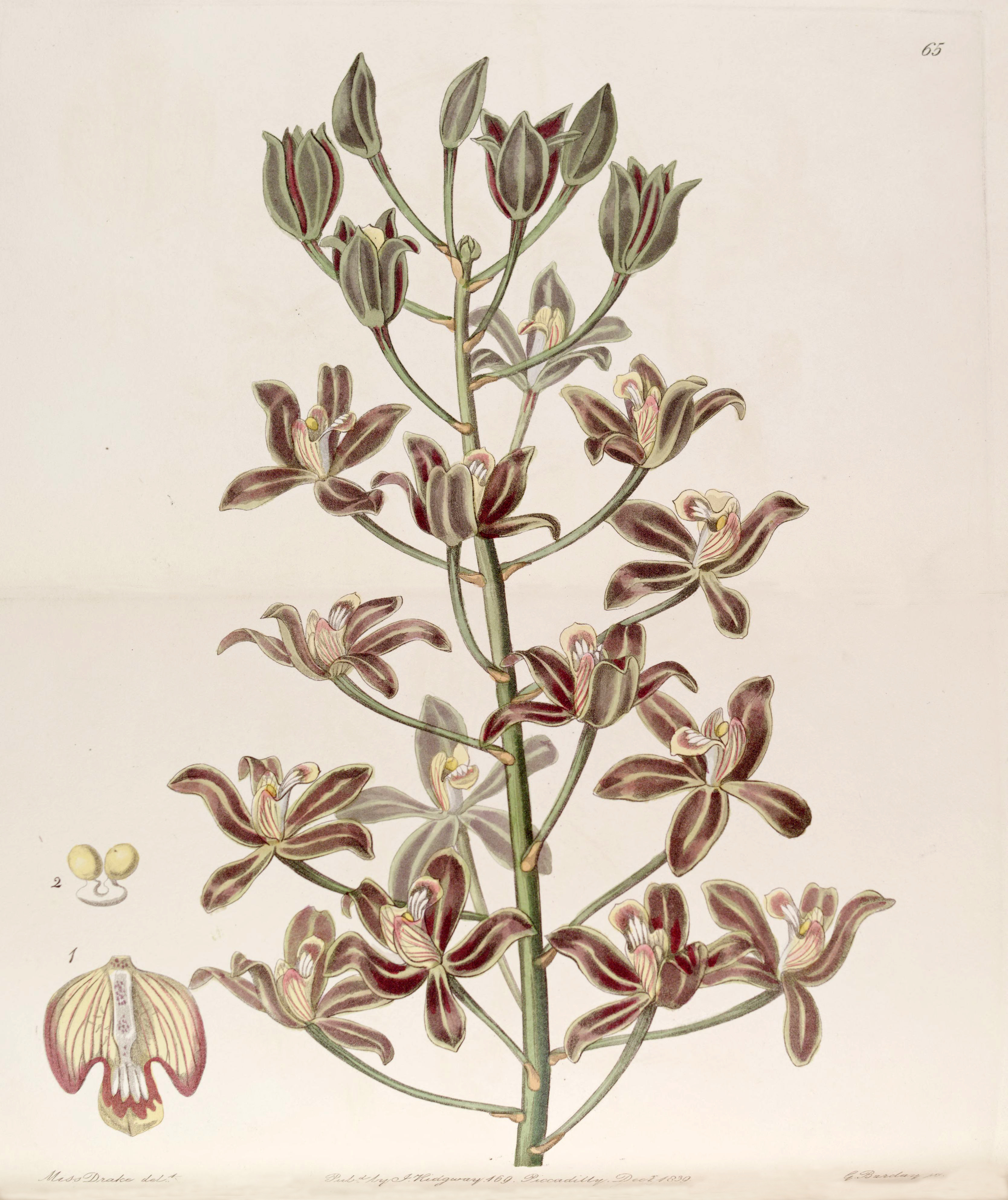

Scientific classification
- Kingdom: Plantae
- Clade: Tracheophytes
- Clade: Angiosperms
- Clade: Monocots
- Order: Asparagales
- Family: Orchidaceae
- Subfamily: Epidendroideae
- Genus: Grammatophyllum
- Species: G. multiflorum

Binomial name
- Grammatophyllum multiflorum Lindl.

= Grammatophyllum multiflorum =

Species of orchid

Grammatophyllum multiflorum or the multiflowered grammatophyllum, is a species of orchid endemic to the Philippines. The plant is found only in the country at elevations of up to 300 m (980 ft). The flowers are yellowish-green with dark green markings, and can remain fresh for up to 270 days; a duration equaled only by Dendrobium stratiotes.

Grammatophyllum multiflorum from the Philippine Orchid Society

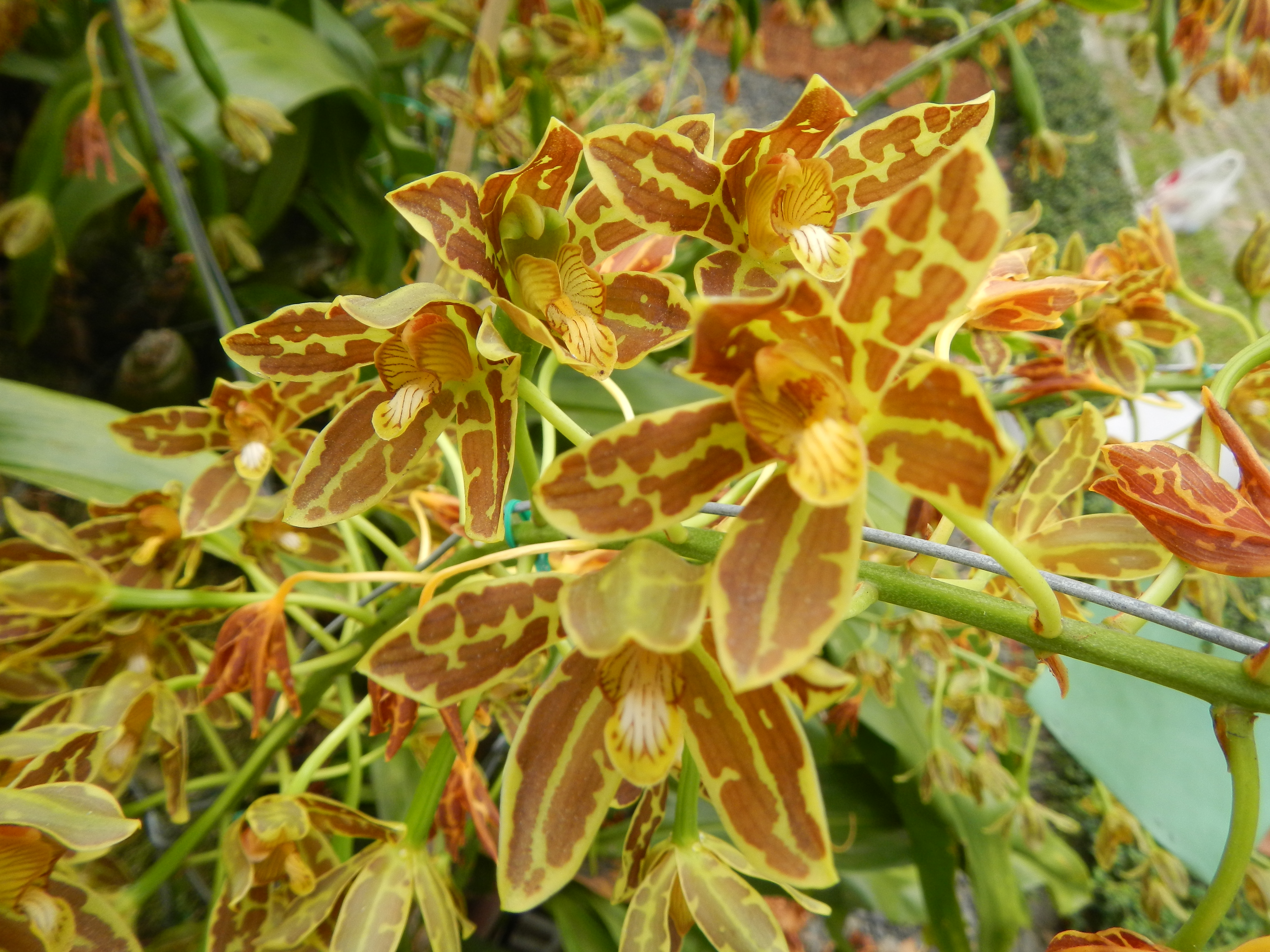

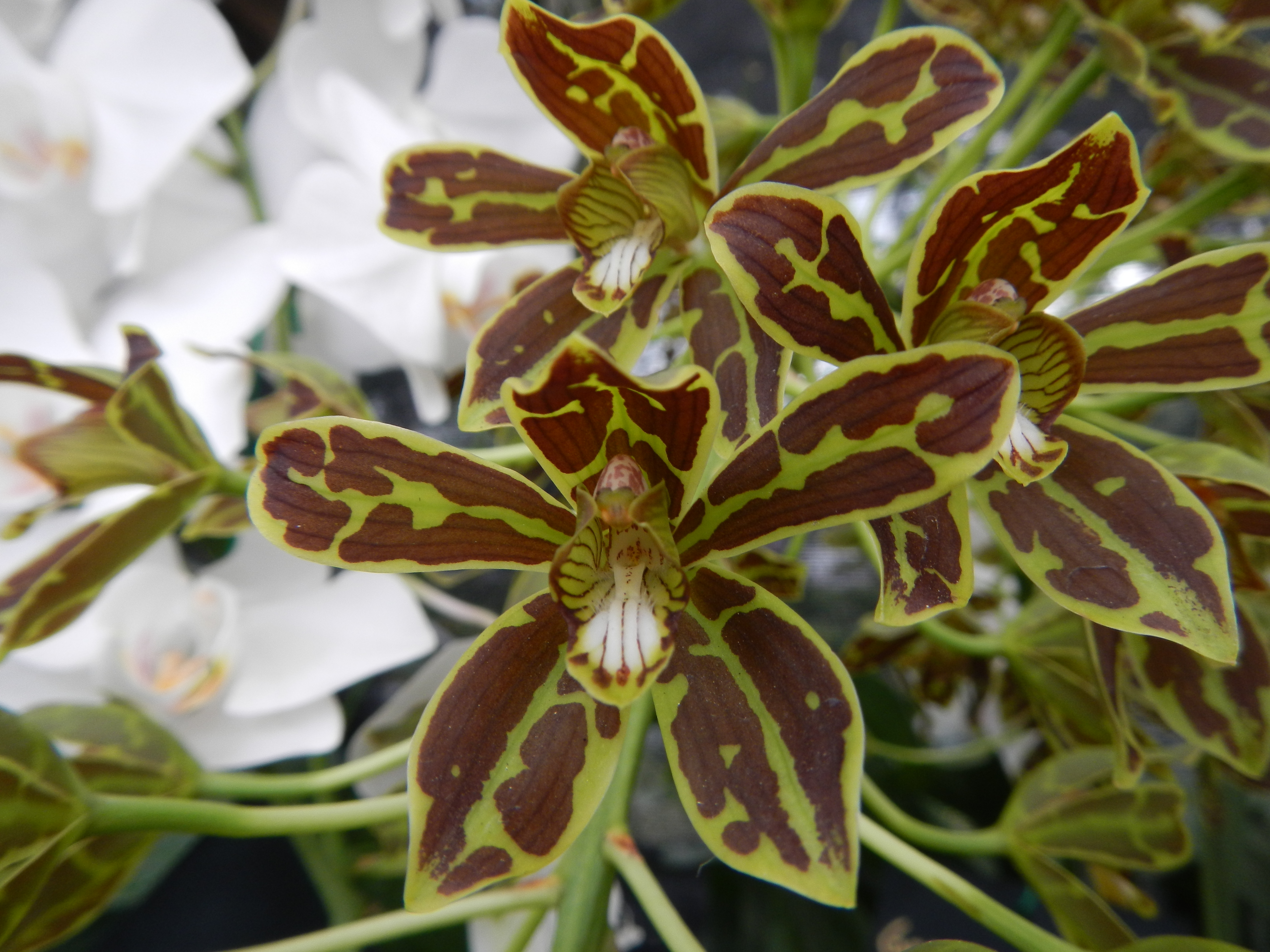

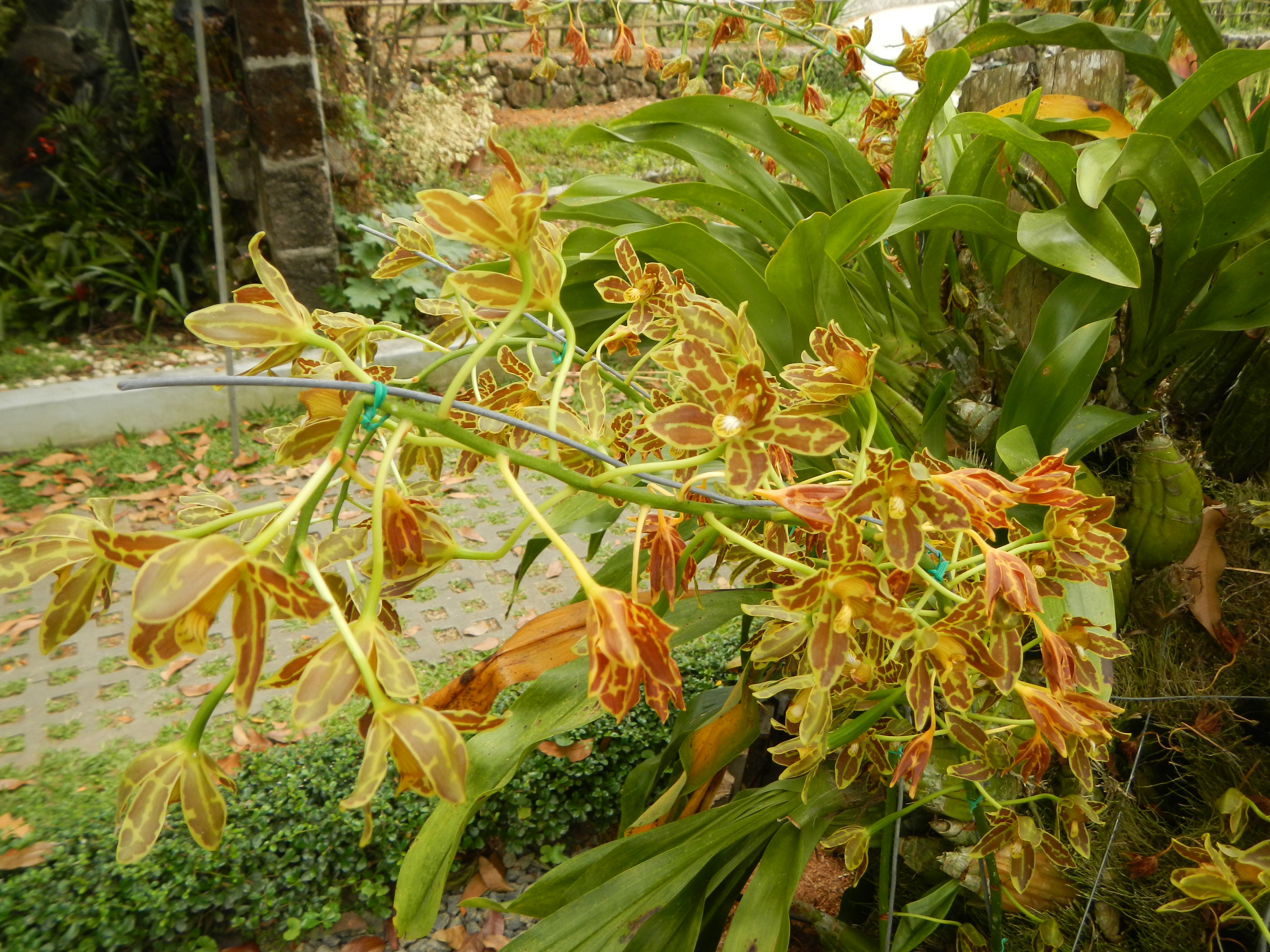

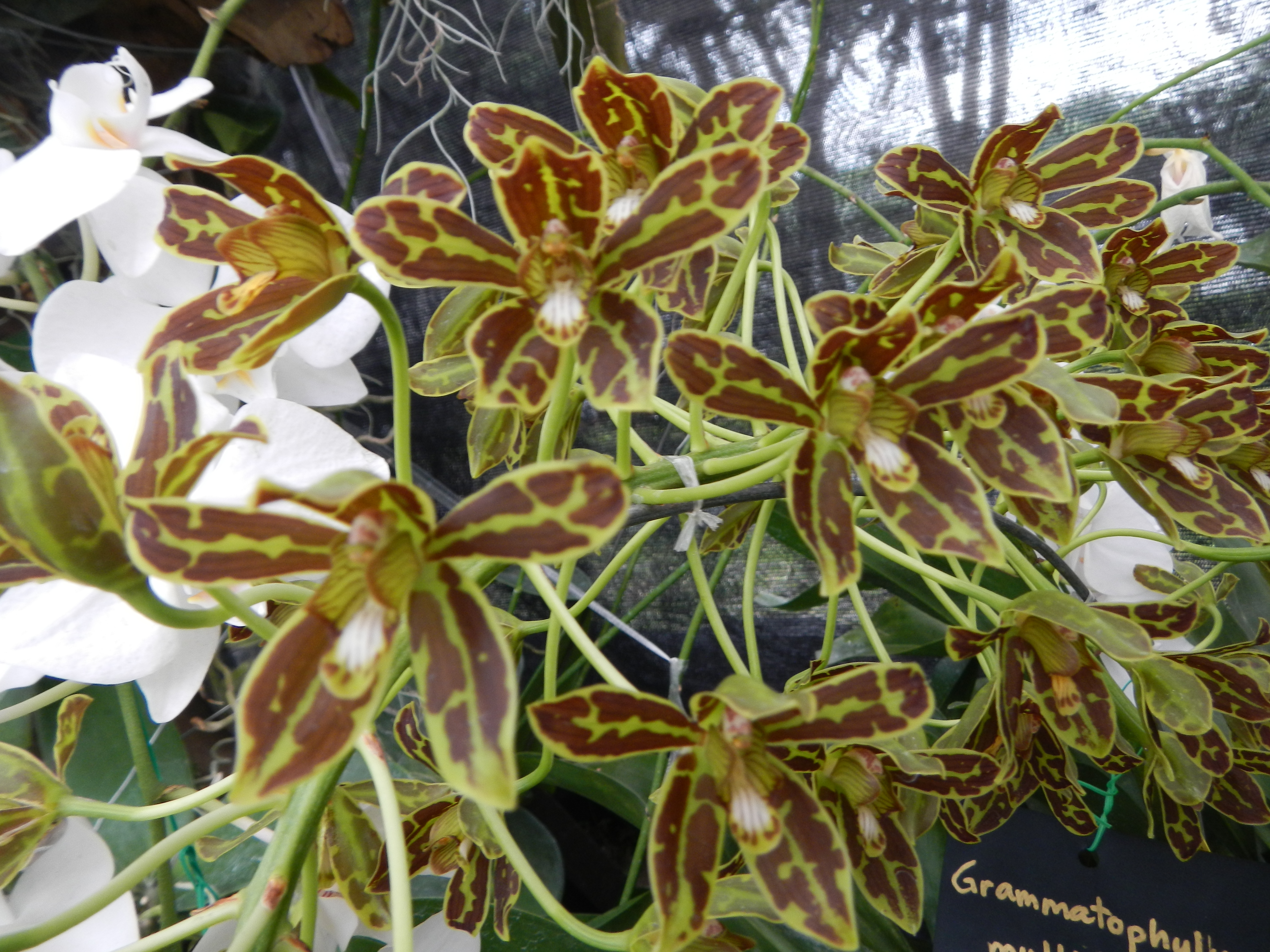

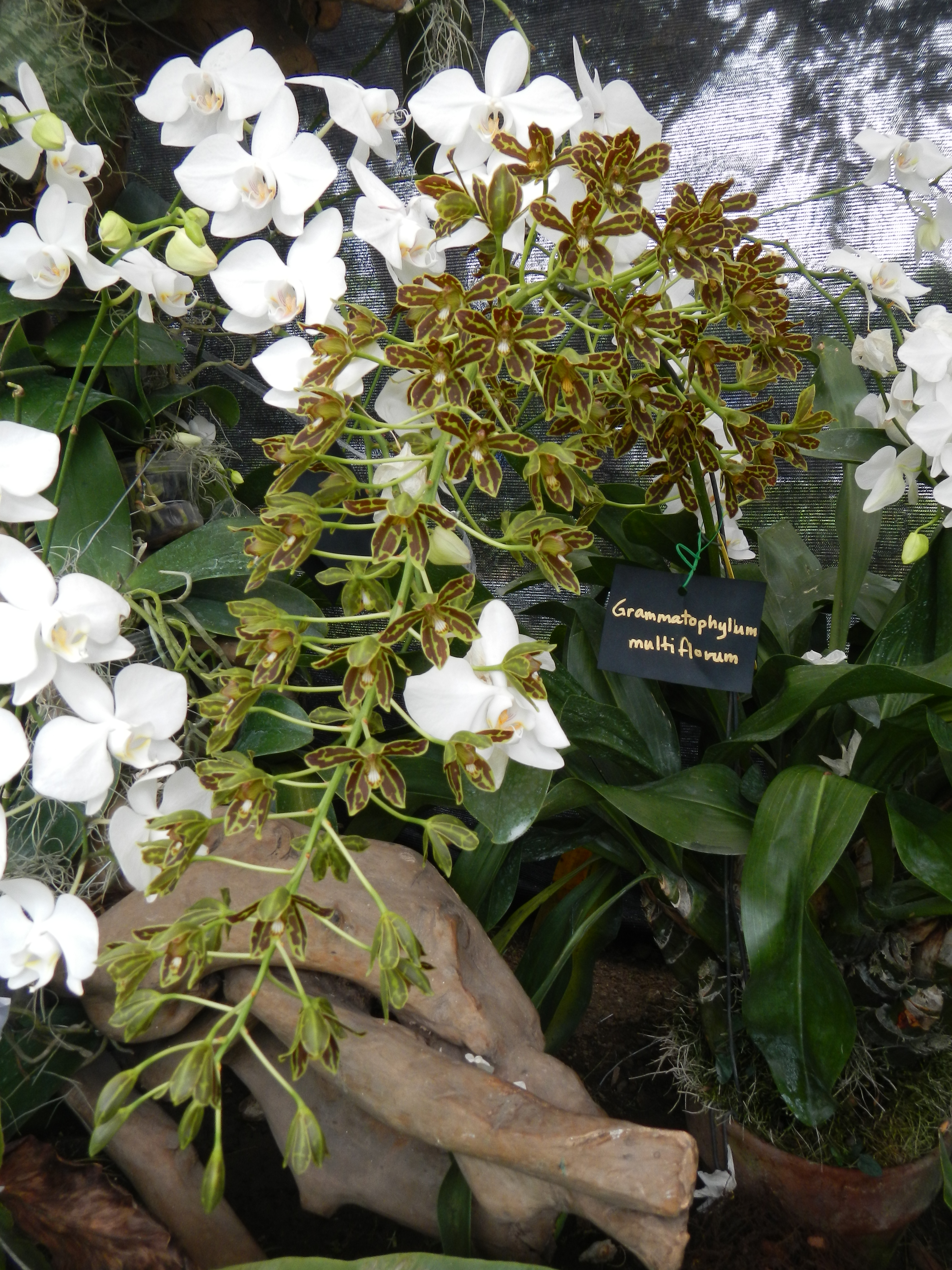
