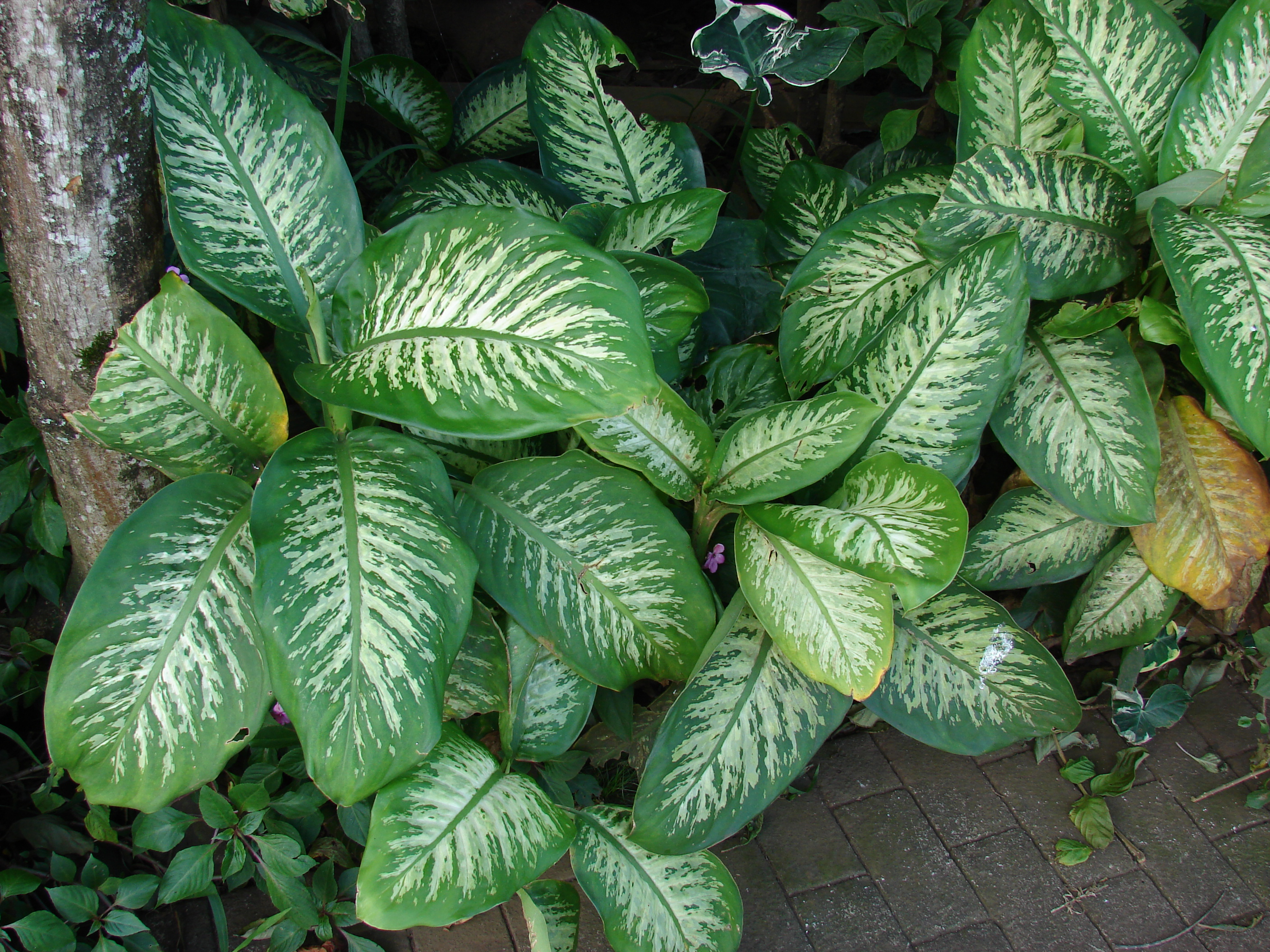
- D. seguine 'Tropic Snow'

Scientific classification
- Kingdom: Plantae
- Clade: Tracheophytes
- Clade: Angiosperms
- Clade: Monocots
- Order: Alismatales
- Family: Araceae
- Genus: Dieffenbachia
- Species: D. seguine

Binomial name
- Dieffenbachia seguine (Jacq.) Heinrich Wilhelm Dieffenbachia compacta Dieffenbachia maculata Dieffenbachia picta

= Dieffenbachia seguine =

Species of flowering plant

Dieffenbachia seguine, widely known as dumbcane, as well as leopard lily or tuftroot, is a species of Dieffenbachia, a flowering aroid plant of the family Araceae (the arums). It is native to the neotropical realm of the Americas, from extreme southern Mexico and Belize and much of Central America, as well as the northern half of South America (it is typically absent in Argentina, Chile, Paraguay and Uruguay). It is found on many Caribbean islands and territories, including Cuba, Grand Bahama, Grenada, Guadeloupe, Hispaniola, Îles des Saintes, Jamaica, Martinique, Puerto Rico, Saba, Saint Kitts and Trinidad and Tobago. D. seguine is also found on the Galápagos islands of Santa Cruz and San Cristóbal, where it was likely introduced by humans.

== Description ==
Within the aroid family—which contains other iconic genera such as Alocasia, Monstera and Philodendron—Dieffenbachia seguine and its relatives, interestingly, do not grow as a vine or from a tuber, instead growing vertically into a "bamboo"- or "cane"-like shrub (hence the common name dumbcane). Smaller or juvenile plants may only grow to 3 feet (0.91 m) tall, while mature specimens can attain heights of up to 10 feet (3.0 m), and 2 feet (0.61 m) to 3 feet (0.91 m) in trunk width. The plant's leaves are large and green, often with variegated white patterns. Like the entire Araceae family, and indeed all Dieffenbachias, the sap is toxic; the entire plant contains a high concentration of calcium oxalate crystals which may produce negative side effects if ingested, potentially ranging from anaphylactic shock and respiratory failure to even death. The plant produces the typical whitish inflorescence seen amongst aroids, visually-similar to those found on the common 'calla lily' (Zantedeschia aethiopica) or the 'peace lily' (Spathiphyllum wallisii), distinguished by a whitish bract (spathe) containing an inner spadix.

== Cultivation ==
Dieffenbachia seguine is cultivated as an ornamental plant in temperate shade gardens and as a potted house plant. Cultivars emphasize different patterns of variegation.
