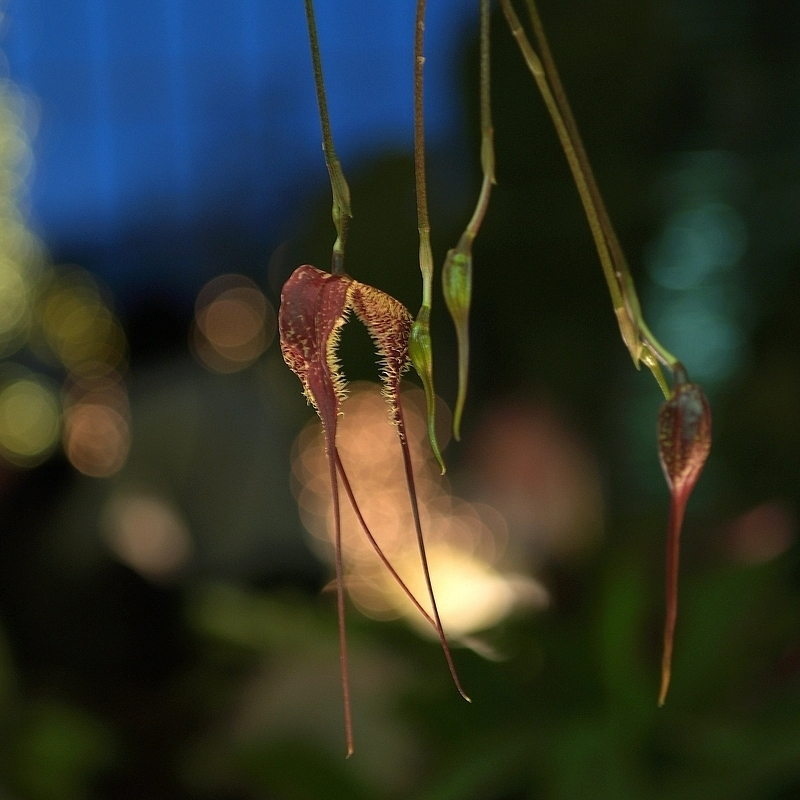

Conservation status
- Vulnerable (IUCN 3.1)

Scientific classification
- Kingdom: Plantae
- Clade: Tracheophytes
- Clade: Angiosperms
- Clade: Monocots
- Order: Asparagales
- Family: Orchidaceae
- Subfamily: Epidendroideae
- Genus: Dracula
- Species: D. wallisii

Binomial name
- Dracula wallisii (Rchb.f.) Luer

Synonyms
- Masdevallia wallisii Rchb.f.; Masdevallia chimaera var. wallisii (Rchb.f.) H.J.Veitch; Masdevallia chimaera var. stupenda (Rchb.f.) Stein

= Dracula wallisii =

Species of orchid

Dracula wallisii is a species of orchid belonging to the genus Dracula. The species is found at altitudes of 1,600 to 2,600 m (5,200 to 8,500 ft) in Cordillera Central, Colombia. It is a common species, with large flowers that are often highly variable in form.

The species was first discovered near Frontino, Antioquia, Colombia by the German plant collector Gustav Wallis in 1871. It was formally described in 1875 by the German orchidologist Heinrich Gustav Reichenbach who named it after Wallis.
