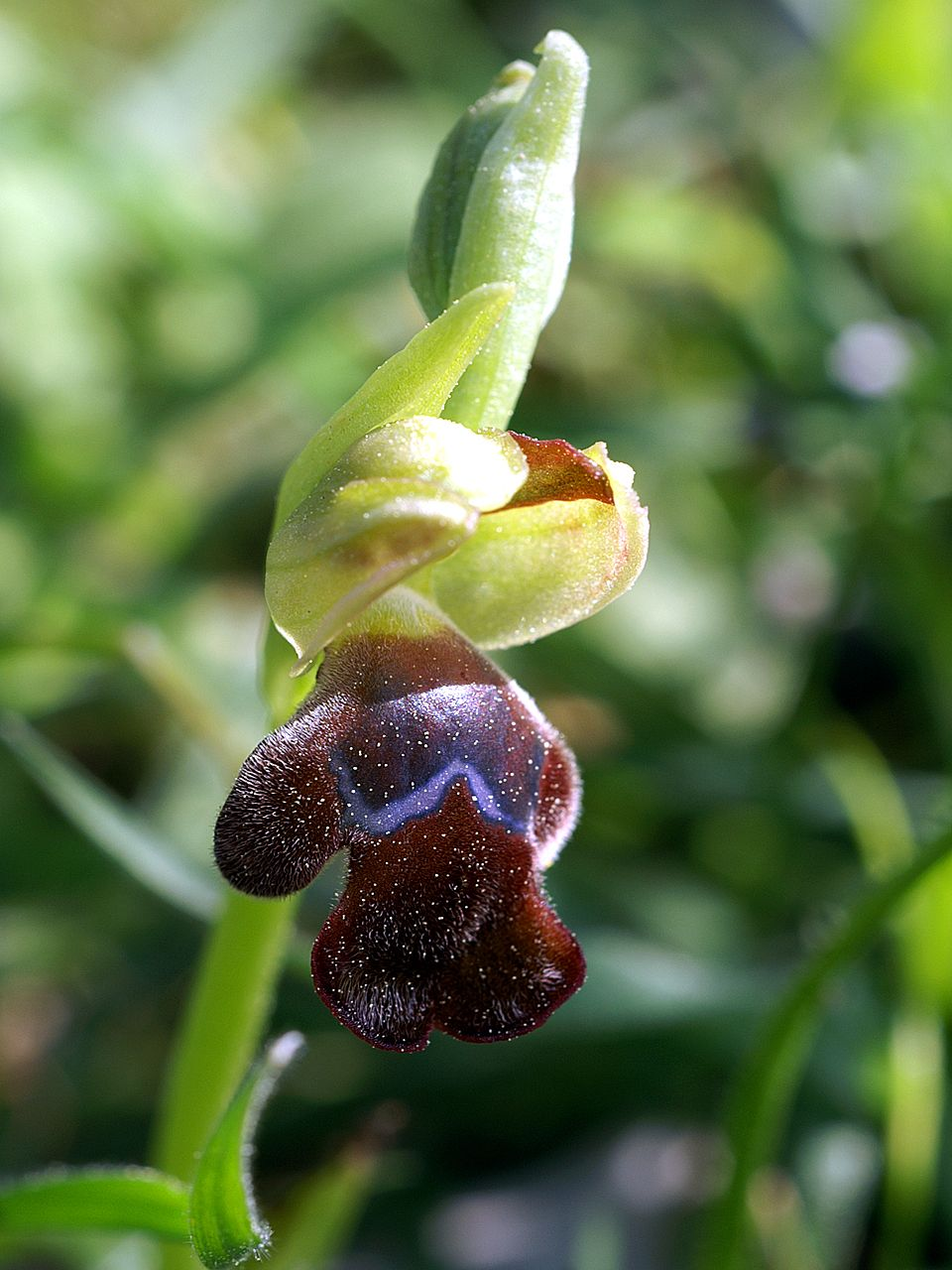

Scientific classification
- Kingdom: Plantae
- Clade: Tracheophytes
- Clade: Angiosperms
- Clade: Monocots
- Order: Asparagales
- Family: Orchidaceae
- Subfamily: Orchidoideae
- Genus: Ophrys
- Species: O. omegaifera H.Fleischm.
- Subspecies: O. o. subsp. omegaifera

Trinomial name
- Ophrys omegaifera subsp. omegaifera

Synonyms
- Ophrys apollonae Paulus & M.Hirth; Ophrys polycratis P.Delforge

= Ophrys omegaifera subsp. omegaifera =

Species of orchid

Ophrys omegaifera subsp. omegaifera, synonym Ophrys apollonae (the Apollona bee-orchid), is a subspecies of orchid native to France, Greece, Crete, the East Aegean Islands and Turkey. Very early flowering forms native to Greece, the East Aegean Islands and Turkey have been distinguished as Ophrys apollonae. They usually have a shorter stem and with one (more rarely two) small flowers, with length just above 1 cm, and a lip 11.7 – 13.7 mm long, much smaller than that of Ophrys omegaifera var. basilissa, which is also a very early flowering plant. As of December 2023, Plants of the World Online treated Ophrys apollonae as a synonym of Ophrys omegaifera subsp. omegaifera.

== Local names ==
- Greek οφρύς του Απόλλωνα
- Turkish uçarı salep
