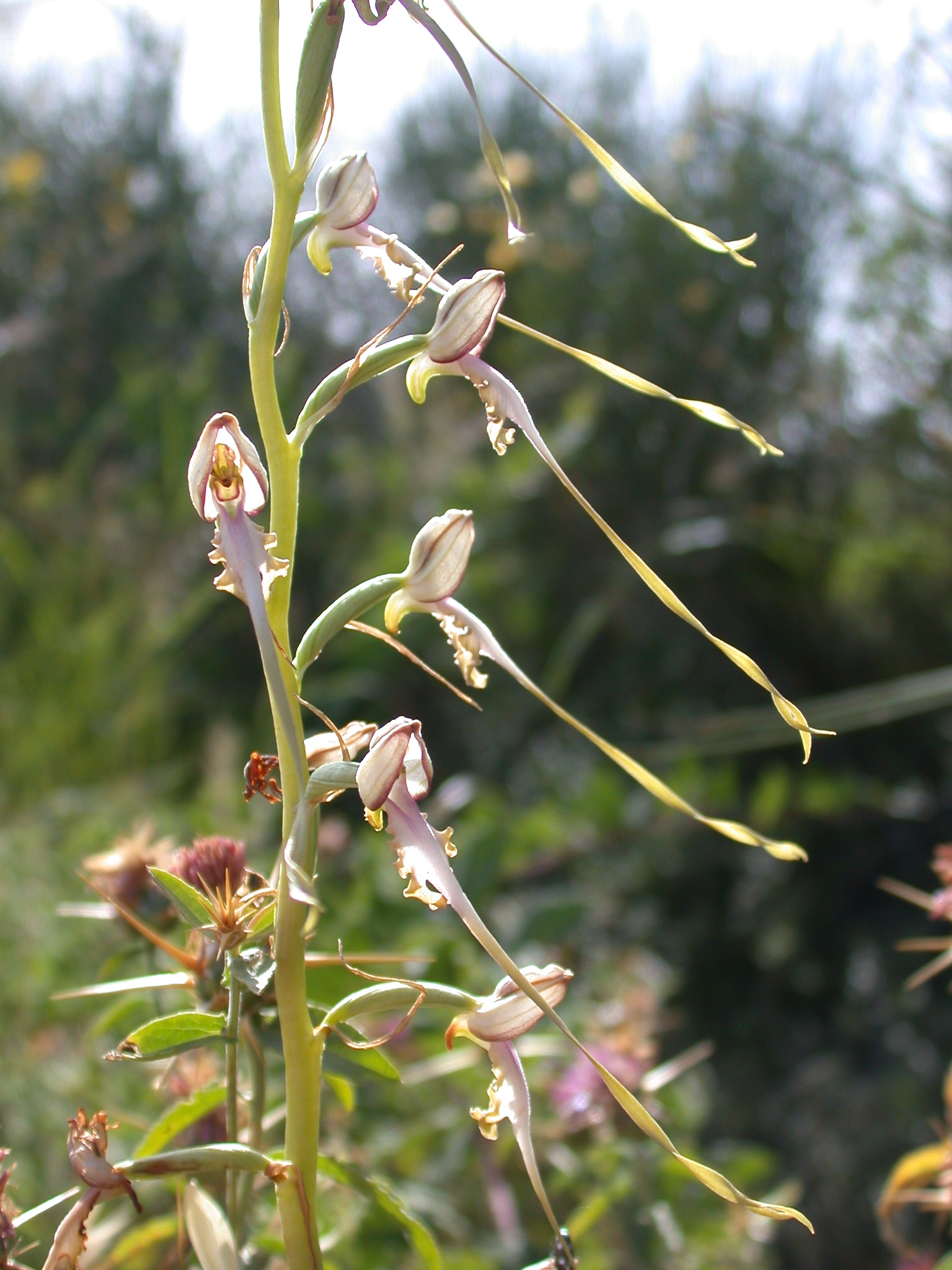

Scientific classification
- Kingdom: Plantae
- Clade: Tracheophytes
- Clade: Angiosperms
- Clade: Monocots
- Order: Asparagales
- Family: Orchidaceae
- Subfamily: Orchidoideae
- Genus: Himantoglossum
- Species: H. caprinum

Binomial name
- Himantoglossum caprinum (M.Bieb.) Spreng.

Synonyms
- Orchis caprina M.Bieb. (basionym); Aceras caprinum (M.Bieb.) Lindl.; Aceras hircina var. caprina (M.Bieb.) Rchb.f.; Loroglossum caprinum (M.Bieb.) Beck; Loroglossum hircinum var. caprinum (M.Bieb.) Gallé; Loroglossum hircinum subsp. caprinum (M.Bieb.) E.G.Camus in E.G.Camus, P.Bergon & A.A.Camus; Himantoglossum hircinum ssp. caprinum (M.Bieb.) H. Sund.; Himantoglossum caprinum ssp. rumelicum H. Baumann & R. Lorenz; Himantoglossum caprinum ssp. robustissimum Kreutz

= Himantoglossum caprinum =

Species of orchid

Himantoglossum caprinum is a species of orchid native to southeastern Europe and the Middle East.

Two subspecies are recognized:

- Himantoglossum caprinum subsp. caprinum - Crete and other Greek Islands, Crimea, Iran, Iraq, Turkey, Palestine, Israel, Bulgaria
- Himantoglossum caprinum subsp. rumelicum H.Baumann & R.Lorenz - Czech Republic, Croatia, Montenegro, Greece, Crimea, North Caucasus, Turkey, Palestine, Israel
