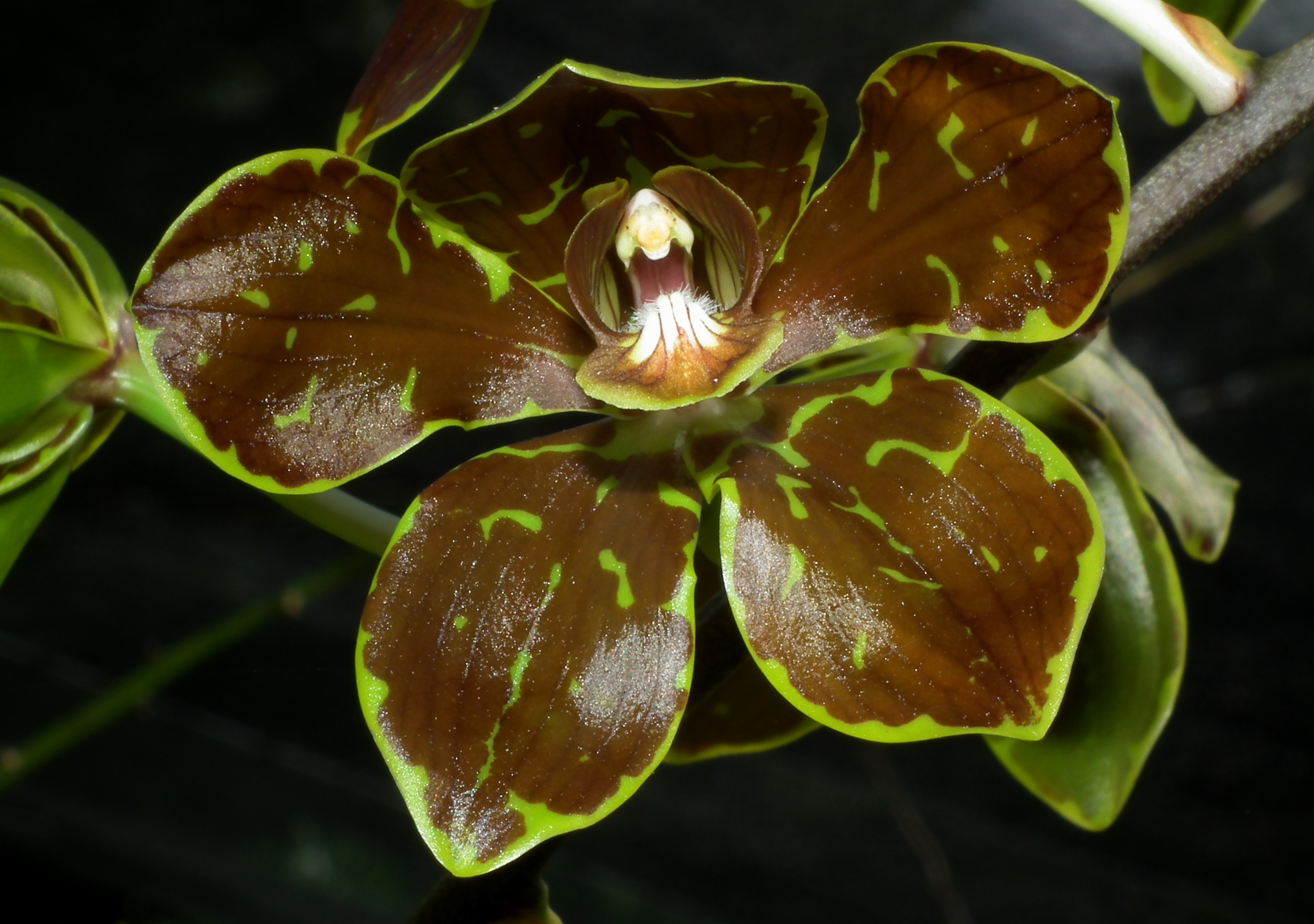

Scientific classification
- Kingdom: Plantae
- Clade: Tracheophytes
- Clade: Angiosperms
- Clade: Monocots
- Order: Asparagales
- Family: Orchidaceae
- Subfamily: Epidendroideae
- Genus: Grammatophyllum
- Species: G. martae

Binomial name
- Grammatophyllum martae Quis. ex Valmayor & Tiu

= Grammatophyllum martae =

Species of orchid

Grammatophyllum martae (Marta's Gramamatophyllum, named after Marta Rivilia y Montilla) is a species of orchid in the family Orchidaceae. It is endemic to the Philippines.

== Description ==
Habit: Erect & sympodial . with large Pseudobulbs of up to 22 cm tall and 10 cm in diameter. Leaves: 4 leaves at the apex of the pseudobulb, of 60 cm long and 10 cm wide. Inflorescences: bending, reaching 1.5 metres in length and able to carry up to 80 flowers. Flowers: are up to 4.5 cm wide, dark brown with yellow markings.

== Taxonomy and nomenclature ==
The Filipino botanist Eduardo Quisumbing originally described this species but the name was not published. Professor Helen Valmayor and Danilo A. Tiu published the name in 1983, in Orchidiana Philippiniana. The species was named after Mrs Martha Montilla Rivilla, a Philippine orchid enthusiast from Negros Occidental, in the Philippines.

== Distribution and habitat ==
Found only in Negros in the Philippines. It grows as an epiphyte at elevations of up to 300 metres.
