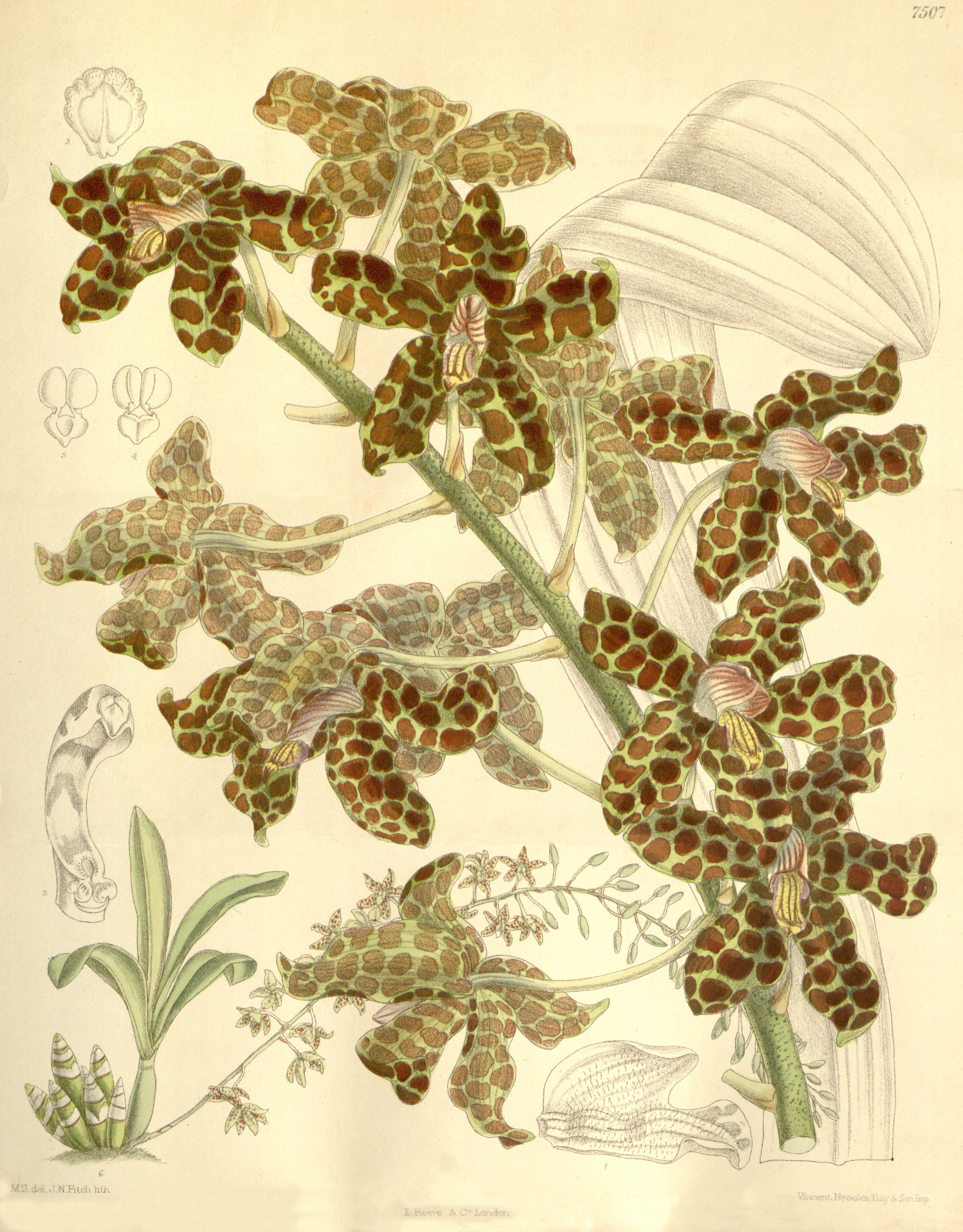

Scientific classification
- Kingdom: Plantae
- Clade: Tracheophytes
- Clade: Angiosperms
- Clade: Monocots
- Order: Asparagales
- Family: Orchidaceae
- Subfamily: Epidendroideae
- Genus: Grammatophyllum
- Species: G. rumphianum

Binomial name
- Grammatophyllum rumphianum Miq.

Synonyms
- Grammatophyllum fenzlianum Rchb.f. 1862; Grammatophyllum guilelmii Kraenzl. 1894; Grammatophyllum guilielmi-secundi Krzl. 1894; Grammatophyllum guilielmi-II Krzl. 1894

= Grammatophyllum rumphianum =

Species of orchid

Grammatophyllum rumphianum is an epiphytic species of orchid.

== Distribution ==
- Borneo, the Moluccas and the Philippines.
