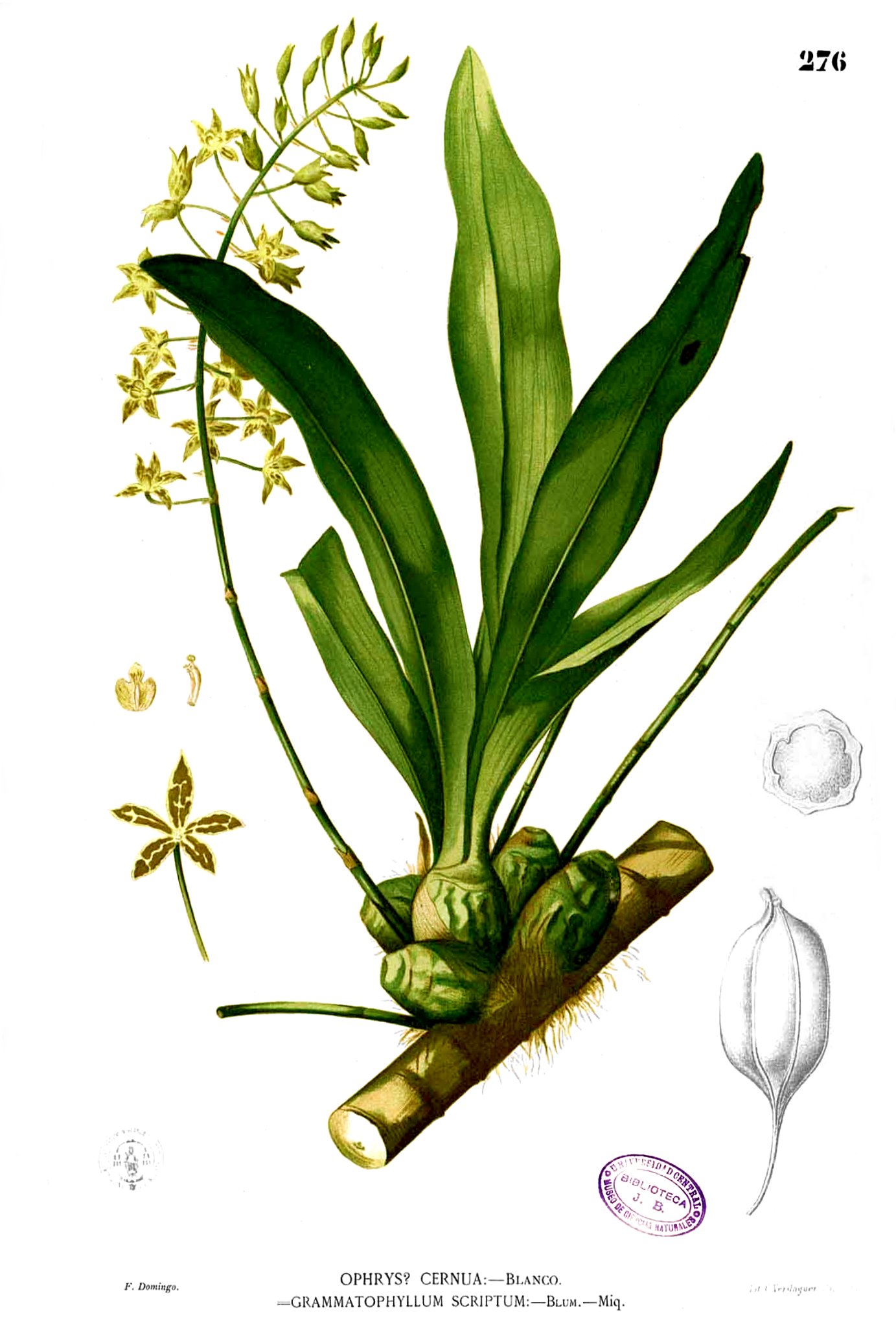

Scientific classification
- Kingdom: Plantae
- Clade: Tracheophytes
- Clade: Angiosperms
- Clade: Monocots
- Order: Asparagales
- Family: Orchidaceae
- Subfamily: Epidendroideae
- Genus: Grammatophyllum
- Species: G. scriptum

Binomial name
- Grammatophyllum scriptum (L.) Blume

Synonyms
- Epidendrum scriptum L. (basionym); Cymbidium scriptum (L.) Sw.; Vanda scripta (L.) Spreng.; Gabertia scripta (L.) Gaudich.

= Grammatophyllum scriptum =

Species of orchid

Grammatophyllum scriptum is a species of orchid. The flowers are generally up to 4.5 cm wide, green with dark brown markings, held in racemes of up to 150 blooms. Grammatophyllum scriptum is native to south east Asia and is found in low-lying coastal areas (sea level to 100 metres). In the Philippines, this type of orchid is called "tawatawa".

Due to their large size, plants are rarely found in cultivation outside botanical institutions.
