= Grammatophyllum wallisii =

Scientific classification
- Kingdom: Plantae
- Clade: Tracheophytes
- Clade: Angiosperms
- Clade: Monocots
- Order: Asparagales
- Family: Orchidaceae
- Subfamily: Epidendroideae
- Genus: Grammatophyllum
- Species: G. wallisii

Binomial name
- Grammatophyllum wallisii Rchb.f.

Species of orchid

Grammatophyllum wallisii (Wallis's grammatophyllum) is a member of the family Orchidaceae endemic to the Philippines. The name honors Gustav Wallis.
