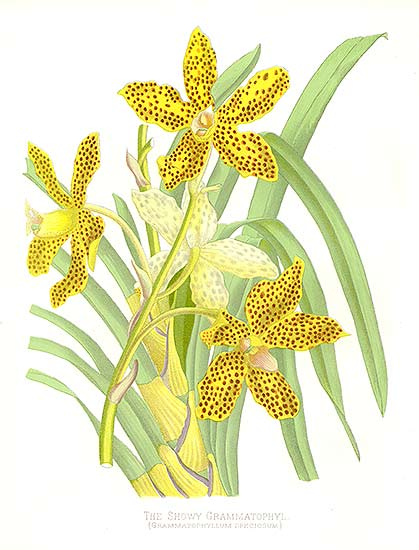
- Grammatophyllum speciosum

Scientific classification
- Kingdom: Plantae
- Clade: Tracheophytes
- Clade: Angiosperms
- Clade: Monocots
- Order: Asparagales
- Family: Orchidaceae
- Subfamily: Epidendroideae
- Tribe: Cymbidieae
- Subtribe: Cymbidiinae
- Genus: Grammatophyllum; Blume

Synonyms
- Gabertia Gaudich.; Pattonia Wight; Sadokum D.Tiu & Cootes

= Grammatophyllum =

Genus of orchids

Grammatophyllum, sometimes abbreviated in horticultural trade as Gram, is a genus of 13 currently known orchid species. The name is derived from the Greek words 'gramma' (a line or streak or mark) and 'phyllon' (leaf), referring to the parallel leaf veins or the markings of the perianth. This epiphytic genus occurs in dense rainforest from Indo-China, to Indonesia, Malaysia, the Philippines, New Guinea, and the Southwest Pacific islands.

The species produce several racemes, arising from the base of the pseudobulb, with many yellow-green to olive-green, waxy flowers with dark purplish-red marks. The pseudobulbs are enveloped by sheaths.

These are medium-sized to very large orchids, including the giant orchid (Grammatophyllum speciosum), believed to be the largest orchid species in existence. Its pseudobulbs can grow to a length of 2.5 m. Plants can develop into gigantic clusters weighing from several hundred kilograms to one ton. The roots form spectacular bundles.

The more modest bell orchid (Grammatophyllum scriptum) is another well-known species, with pseudobulbs of 20 cm, from which originate 3 to 4 stout leaves with a length of 1 m.

Grammatophyllum multiflorum is one of the longest-blooming orchids in existence: it can be in bloom for nine months. See also Dendrobium cuthbertsonii, whose flowers have been reported to last up to ten months each.

Grammatophyllum 'Tiger's paw' is a hybrid from G. elegans and G. fenzlianum.

== Species ==
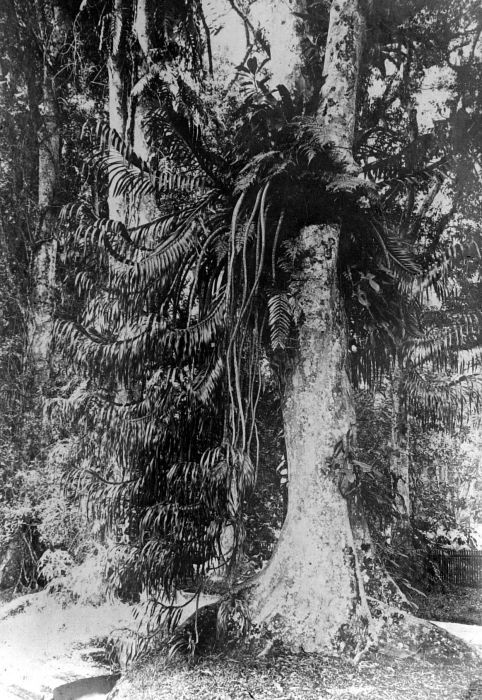
Grammatophyllum speciosum in the Bogor Botanical Gardens in Indonesia

1. Grammatophyllum elegans (Fiji and Philippines).
2. Grammatophyllum kinabaluense (Sabah).
3. Grammatophyllum martae (Philippines )
4. Grammatophyllum measuresianum (Philippines, Borneo)
5. Grammatophyllum multiflorum (Philippines)
6. Grammatophyllum pantherinum (Borneo, Maluku, Philippines, New Guinea, Solomons, Bismarcks)
7. Grammatophyllum ravanii (Philippines)
8. Grammatophyllum rumphianum (Borneo, Maluku).
9. Grammatophyllum schmidtianum (Marianas).
10. Grammatophyllum scriptum : Bell orchid (Malaysia to SW. Pacific).
11. Grammatophyllum speciosum : Giant orchid, tiger orchid, Queen of Orchids (Indo-China to Solomon Is.) - type species
12. Grammatophyllum stapeliiflorum (Malaysia, Philippines to New Guinea).
13. Grammatophyllum wallisii (Philippines )

== See also ==
- Orchidaceae
- Taxonomy of the Orchid family
