= Erich Nelson =

German botanist

- Born: April 14, 1897; Berlin, German Empire
- Died: March 22, 1980 (aged 82); Montreux, Switzerland
- Occupations: Botanist, scientific illustrator

Erich Nelson (14 April 1897, Berlin – 22 March 1980, Montreux, Switzerland) was a German artist, scientific illustrator, and botanist. He became well known for his precise and aesthetic aquarelles and illustrations of European orchids, which totaled more than 2,000. His botanical and mycological author citation is: "E.Nelson".

== Life ==
Erich Nelson was born in 1897 in Berlin to Hedwig Fajans and painter Ernst Nelson. As a child, he spent a great deal of time in the Berlin Zoological Garden. From 1915 to 1918 he served in the armed forces as a sanitarian. After the First World War, he completed his training as an artist in Munich, specializing in landscape paintings and illustrations of the natural world. On 1 April 1923, he married Gerda Kubierschky, daughter of the renowned artist Erich Kubierschky, who supported Nelson during his apprenticeship.

In 1928, Nelson encountered orchids for the first time while traveling in Italy; these plants inspired all his future artistic and scientific work. Consequently, he dedicated himself to studying botany, under Professor K. von Göpel and Professor F. von Wettstein in Munich. In 1931, he published his first scientific book “Die Orchideen Deutschlands und angrenzender Gebiete” (The Orchids of Germany and Neighbouring Countries).

In 1933, Erich Nelson and Gerda, both Jewish, left Germany. After a brief stay in South Tyrol, Italy, they found a home in Chernex-Sur-Montreux in Switzerland. His friend Professor Walter Rytz from Bern, Switzerland, supported Nelson and Gerda in their escape.

After numerous journeys to the Mediterranean region, tirelessly drawing, and intensively studying orchids including at the Geobotanical Institute Rübel, in Zürich, he published four books between 1954 and 1976. First was “Gesetzmässigkeiten der Gestaltwandlung im Blütenbereich. Ihre Bedeutung für das Problem der Evolution” (Laws of Shape Change in the Area of Flowers, and Their Importance for the Problem of Evolution) in 1954, then in 1962 “Gestaltwandel und Artbildung erörtert am Beispiel der Orchideen Europas und der Mittelmeerländer, insbesondere der Gattung Ophrys” (Shape Change and Species Formation Discussed Using the Example of the Orchidaceae of Europe and the Mediterranean Countries, In Particular the Genus Ophrys. With a Monograph and Iconography of the Genus Ophrys), which was followed in 1968 by “Monographie und Ikonographie der Orchidaceen-Gattungen Serapias, Aceras, Loroglossum, Barlia” (Monograph and Iconography of the Orchidaceae Genera Serapias, Aceras, Loroglossum and Barlia), then in 1976 by “Monographie und Ikonographie der Orchidaceen-Gattung Dactylorhiza” (Monograph and Iconography of the Orchidaceae Genus Dactylorhiza). In 1967 the University of Lausanne, Switzerland, awarded him an honorary doctoral degree based on the work in the first two of his four books.

=== Art ===
Erich Nelson was not only an artist but also a scientific illustrator. In many of his paintings he skilfully illustrated the beauty of nature in an impressionist style. But he was also an accomplished botanical artist and scientific illustrator who was able to document the European orchids in such detail that he captured the morphological variation in flower shape and colour between and within orchid species. Professor Heinrich Zoller compared the quality of Erich Nelsons oeuvre with the most famous plant illustrators of the 18th and 19th centuries: Georg Dionysius Ehret (1708–1770), Pierre-Joseph Redoute (1759–1840), and the brothers Franz Bauer (1758–1840), and Ferdinand Bauer (1760–1826).

== Legacy ==
Erich Nelson died in a car accident on 22 March 1980. He left many unpublished illustrations, sketches and aquarelles. In 1988, to conserve and give access to his work his wife, Gerda Nelson, established the foundation Dr. h.c. Erich Nelson under the jurisdiction of the canton Bern, Switzerland, which she appointed as the sole heir for his complete oeuvre. Gerda Nelson, first President of the Nelson Foundation, died in 1990 before the Board of Trustees could begin its duties. The Board posthumously published the last book of Nelson’s work in 2001, under the title “Erich Nelson - Persönlichkeit und Lebenswerk aus heutiger wissenschaftlicher Sicht, mit Publikation seines Bildwerks der Gattung Orchis” (Erich Nelson – Personality and Life’s Work From Today’s Scientific Perspective, with Publication of his Paintings of the Genus Orchis).

== Works ==
- Die Orchideen Deutschlands und angrenzender Gebiete. 1931.
- Gesetzmässigkeiten der Gestaltwandlung im Blütenbereich. Ihre Bedeutung für das Problem der Evolution. 1954.
- Gestaltwandel und Artbildung erörtert am Beispiel der Orchideen Europas und der Mittelmeerländer, insbesondere der Gattung Ophrys. 1962.
- Monographie und Ikonographie der Orchidaceen-Gattungen Serapias, Aceras, Loroglossum, Barlia. 1968.
- Monographie und Ikonographie der Orchidaceen-Gattung Dactylorhiza. 1976.
- Erich Nelson – Persönlichkeit und Lebenswerk aus heutiger wissenschaftlicher Sicht, mit Publikation seines Bildwerks der Gattung Orchis. 2001.

== Literature ==
- E. Nelson: Replik to Prof. Sterins' Review of: E. Nelson, 'Gesetzmässigkeiten der Gestaltwandlung im Blütenbereich, ihre Bedeutung für das Problem der Evolution. In: Evolution. XI, No. 1, 1957, S. 108–110.
- K. Ammann, P-L. Nimis, G. Wagner, M. Beriger: Erich Nelson's Scientific Heritage, A Reassessment. Manuscript for the Symposium on Community Ecology and Conservation Biology in Bern, Switzerland, April 14–18. 1994.
- G. Nelson: Ansprache anlässlich der Vernissage. Ausstellung „Das Wunder der Orchideenblüte, Leben und Werk Erich Nelsons“ im Botanischen Garten in Bern. 1983.
- G. Nelson: Mitteilung. Freies Kolloquium des Systematisch-Geobotanischen Institutes der Universität Bern. 1983.
- P-L. Nimis, R. Schmid-Hollinger: Zur kritischen Analyse des Werkes Erich Nelsons. Freies Kolloquium des Systematisch-Geobotanischen Institutes der Universität Bern. 1983.
