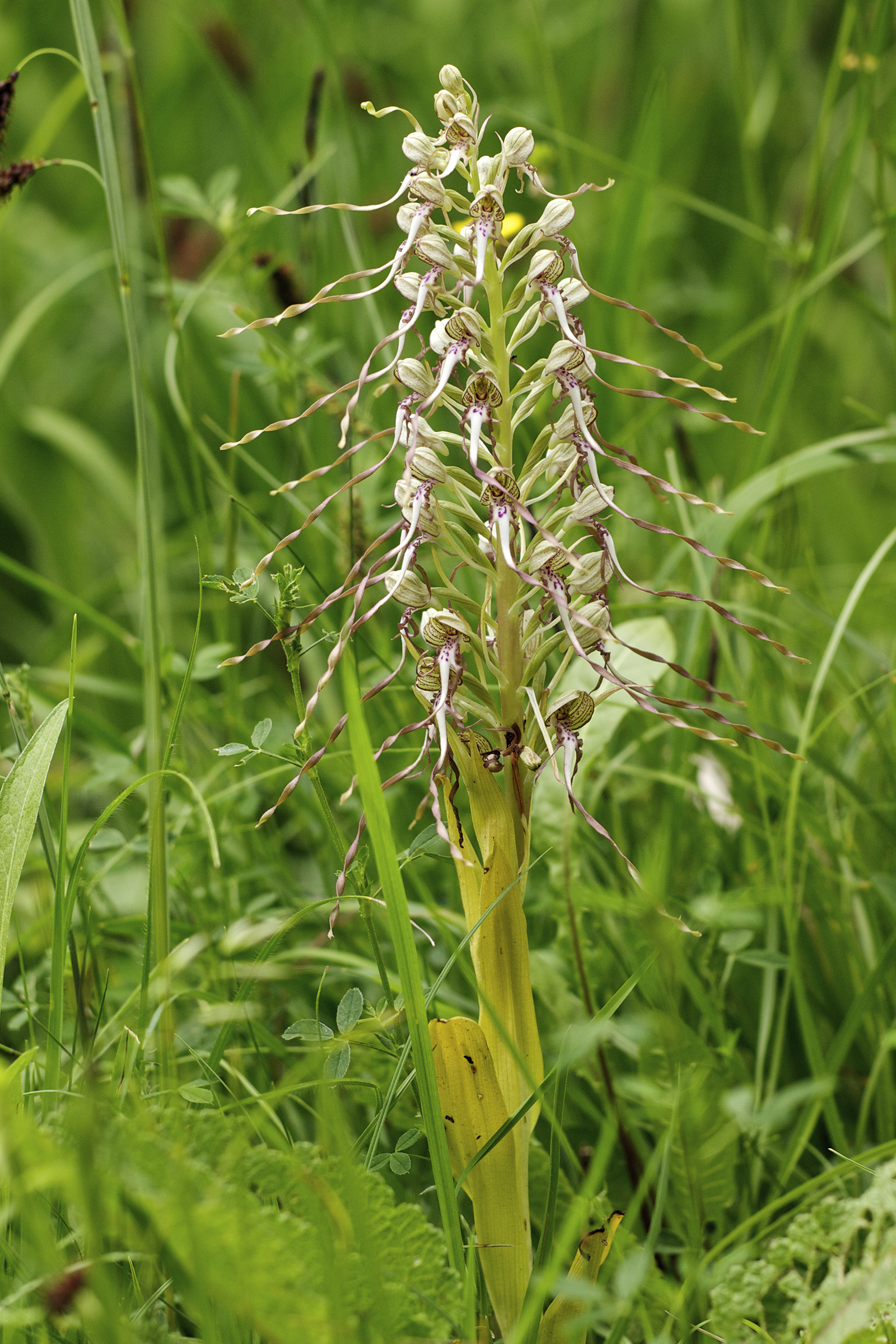

Scientific classification
- Kingdom: Plantae
- Clade: Tracheophytes
- Clade: Angiosperms
- Clade: Monocots
- Order: Asparagales
- Family: Orchidaceae
- Subfamily: Orchidoideae
- Genus: Himantoglossum
- Species: H. hircinum

Binomial name
- Himantoglossum hircinum (L.) Spreng.

Synonyms
- Satyrium hircinum L.; Orchis hircina (L.) Crantz; Loroglossum hircinum (L.) Rich.; Aceras hircinum (L.) Lindl.

= Himantoglossum hircinum =

Species of orchid

Himantoglossum hircinum, the lizard orchid, is a species of orchid in the genus Himantoglossum found in Europe and North Africa.

== Description ==
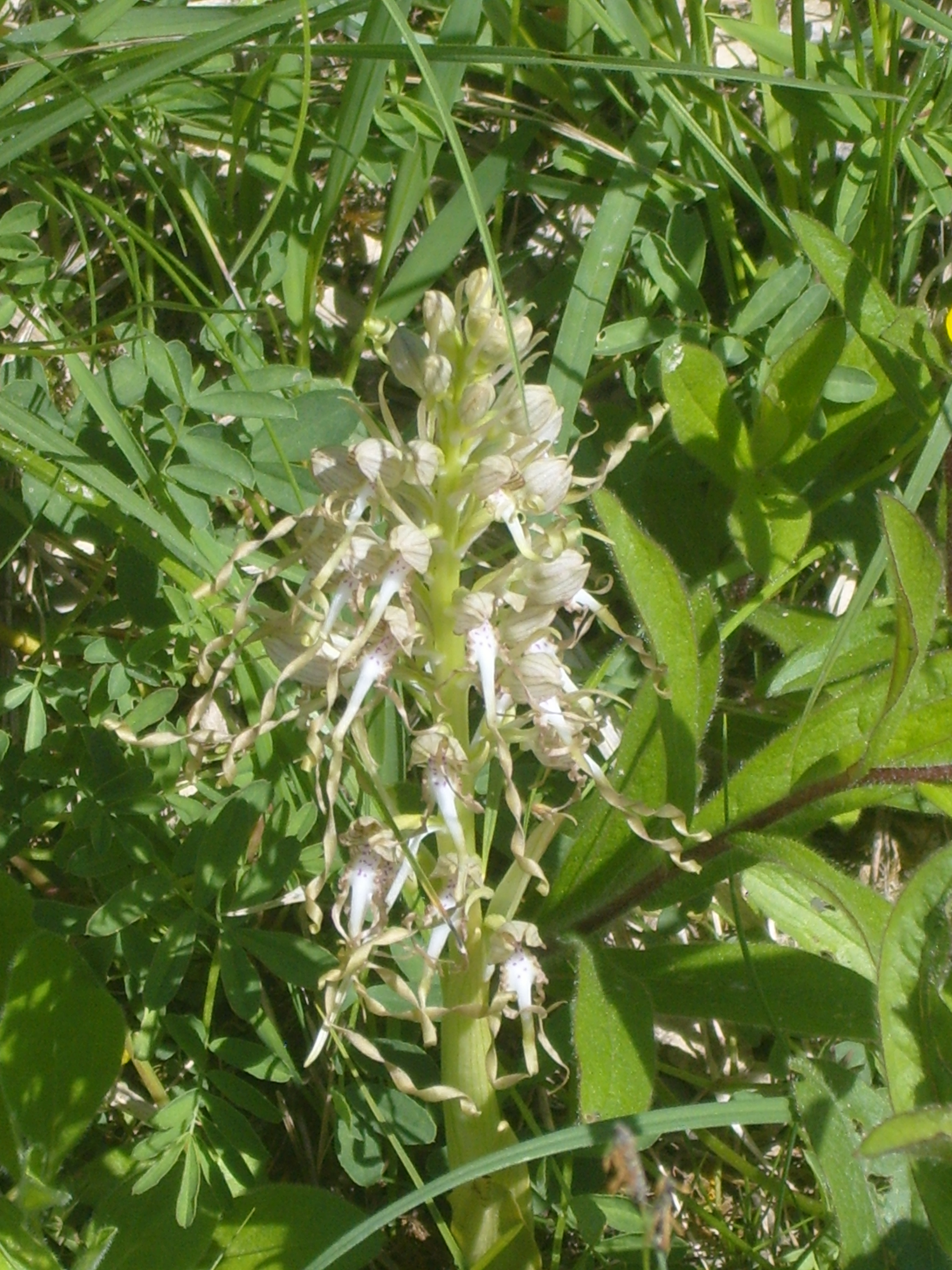
Pale flowered specimen

Himantoglossum hircinum is a perennial herbaceous plant, reaching a height of 115 centimetres (45 in). It persists in the soil as a pair of ovoid/subglobose tubers, with short roots. Its leaves are 5–20 cm long, with basal leaves larger than aerial leaves and the plant is glabrous. Flowers are green-white with a long twisting/coiled labellum which may be tinged with a variety of colours; white, green, purple or brown. Flowers strongly smell of male goats.

A similar looking species called Himantoglossum adriaticum is found in Eastern Europe.

== Habitat and distribution ==
This orchid grows in dry meadows, rocky areas, and open woods. It tends to grow on south-facing grassy slopes, among Bromus and Brachypodium grasses. In France it is often found on roadsides. In the United Kingdom it grows to a maximum altitude of 850m.

This species is found across Europe, from Spain eastwards to the Balkans and in western North Africa. It is usually rare but can sometimes be found in great numbers in suitable habitats. Examples of sites for this species include among sand dunes at Sandwich Bay in the United Kingdom, Massif Central in France and the Mugello Valley in Italy.

== Ecology ==
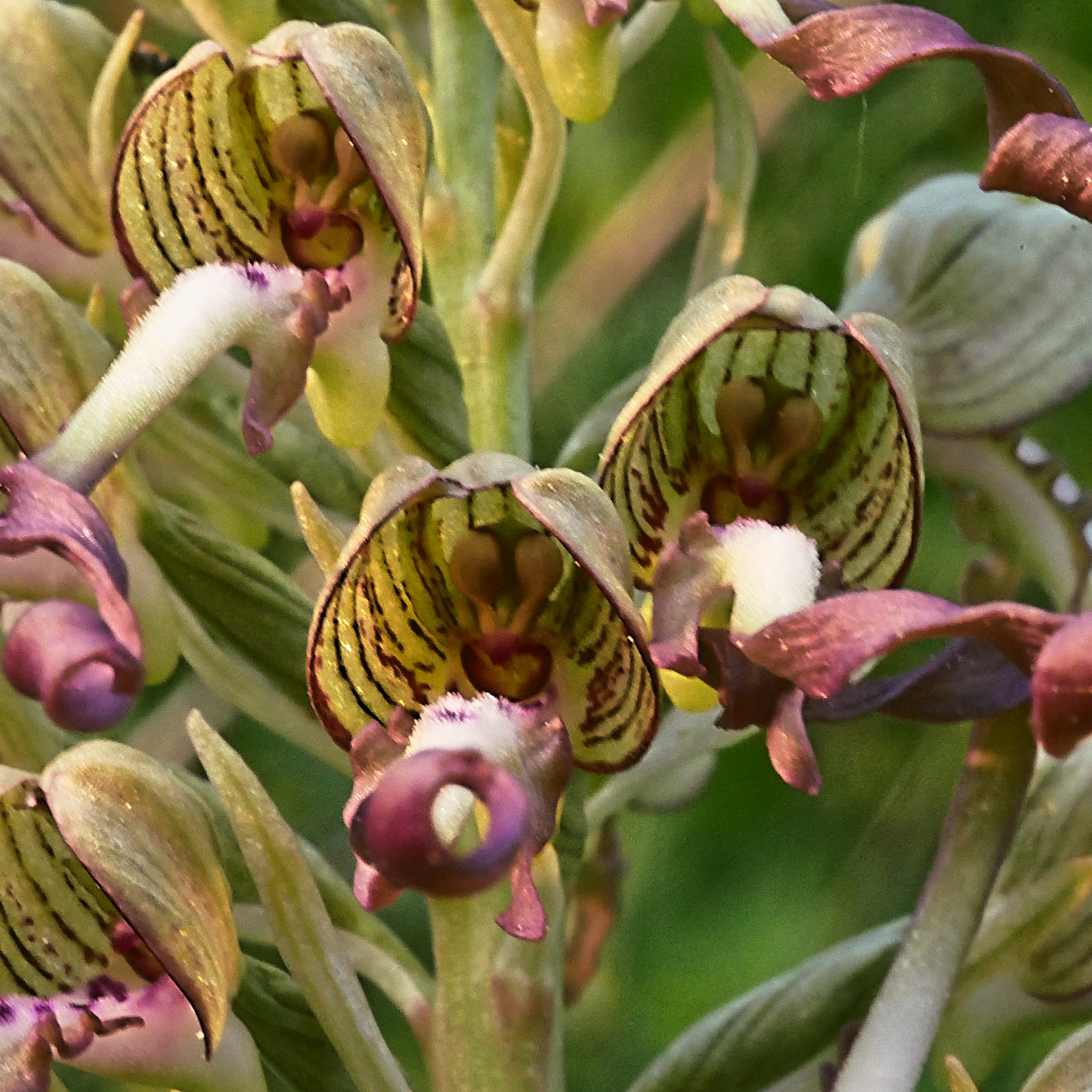
Flowers

Himantoglossum hircinum is a food-deceptive orchid species, meaning the flowers generally provide no nectar to their pollinators. The Botanical Society of Britain and Ireland states however that some plants have been found to provide nectar to pollinators, and that it remains unclear which species are the principal pollinators of the lizard orchid, although they suggest Andrena bees.

It has been suggested that H. hircinum is a mycorrhizal generalist, though some have questioned this, due to the species' limited distribution, and the issue remains unresolved.

== Chemistry ==
Orchinol, loroglossol and hircinol are phenanthrenoids that can be isolated from infected Loroglossum hircinum.

== Conservation ==
This is a rare species with protected status in the United Kingdom and Germany and possibly other countries.

== Etymology ==
The 'lizard' in the plant's English common-name refers to the shape and colour of the flowers. The Latin genus Himantoglossum means 'strap-tongue', after the shape of the flower labellum and the species epithet 'hircinum' means 'of goats', after the smell the flowers produce. In German the plant is known as 'Bocks Riemenzunge', which translates as 'buck's (i.e. goat's) strap-tongue'. The French name 'l'orchis bouc' means 'buck (i.e. goat) orchid'.
