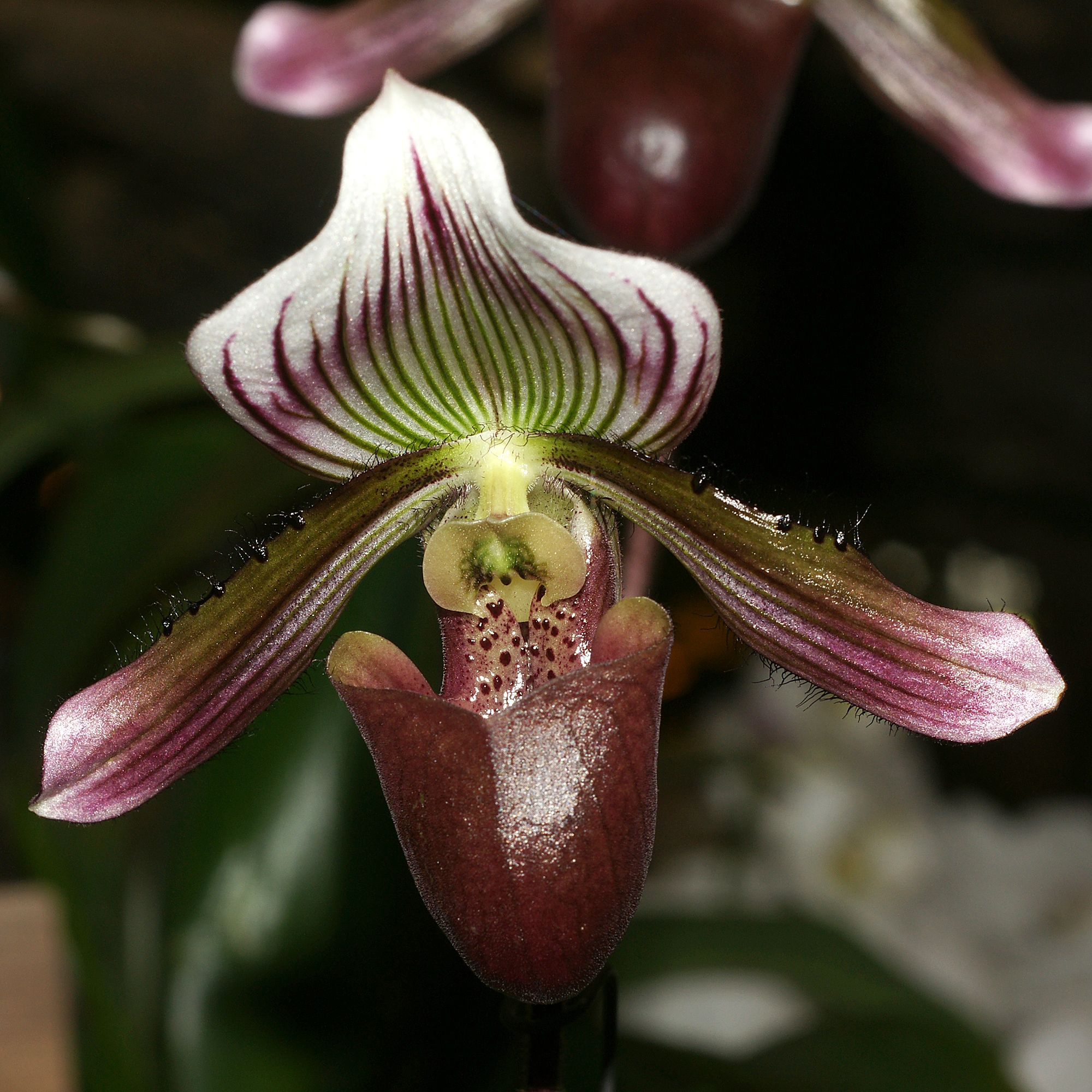

Conservation status
- Endangered (IUCN 3.1)

Scientific classification
- Kingdom: Plantae
- Clade: Tracheophytes
- Clade: Angiosperms
- Clade: Monocots
- Order: Asparagales
- Family: Orchidaceae
- Subfamily: Cypripedioideae
- Genus: Paphiopedilum
- Species: P. barbatum

Binomial name
- Paphiopedilum barbatum (Lindl.) Pfitzer

= Paphiopedilum barbatum =

Species of orchid

Paphiopedilum barbatum, commonly known as the Penang slipper orchid, is a slipper orchid species in the Orchidaceae family. It is found in the Malay Peninsula, Sumatra and Thailand. As of 2015, Paphiopedilum barbatum has been declared as an endangered species by the IUCN. This slipper orchid is considered as highly valuable among orchid enthusiasts.

== Taxonomy ==
The acclaimed original description was from 1841 by Lindley through a sample taken from Gunung Ledang in south of Malay Peninsula, although another description by Blume early in 1823 was presumed to be the original P. barbatum description.

== Description ==
Paphiopedilum barbatum consists of 5 to 8 leaves measuring up to 15 cm (5.9 in) long and 3–5 cm (1.2–2.0 in), with the upper surface being mottled pale and dark green while the lower surface is dark green in color. The leaves have ciliate basal margins. Its purple inflorescence measuring 20–27 cm (7.9–10.6 in) long consists of a single flower (2 in rare cases) that blooms up to 8–10 cm (3.1–3.9 in) wide, with peak flowering occurs in December to January, and June to July.

P. barbatum exhibit a wide morphological and coloration variability within the Malay Peninsula. The Aceh population is differed by its undulate greenish petals and lack of pink or purple tinge.

== Distribution ==
Paphiopedilum barbatum resides throughout the west coast of the Malay Peninsula to the southern state of Johor, including the island of Penang, in elevations of 200–1,300 m (660–4,270 ft) and mean temperature of 22–24 °C (72–75 °F). It is also discovered in Sumatra, including areas of Aceh and West Sumatra.
