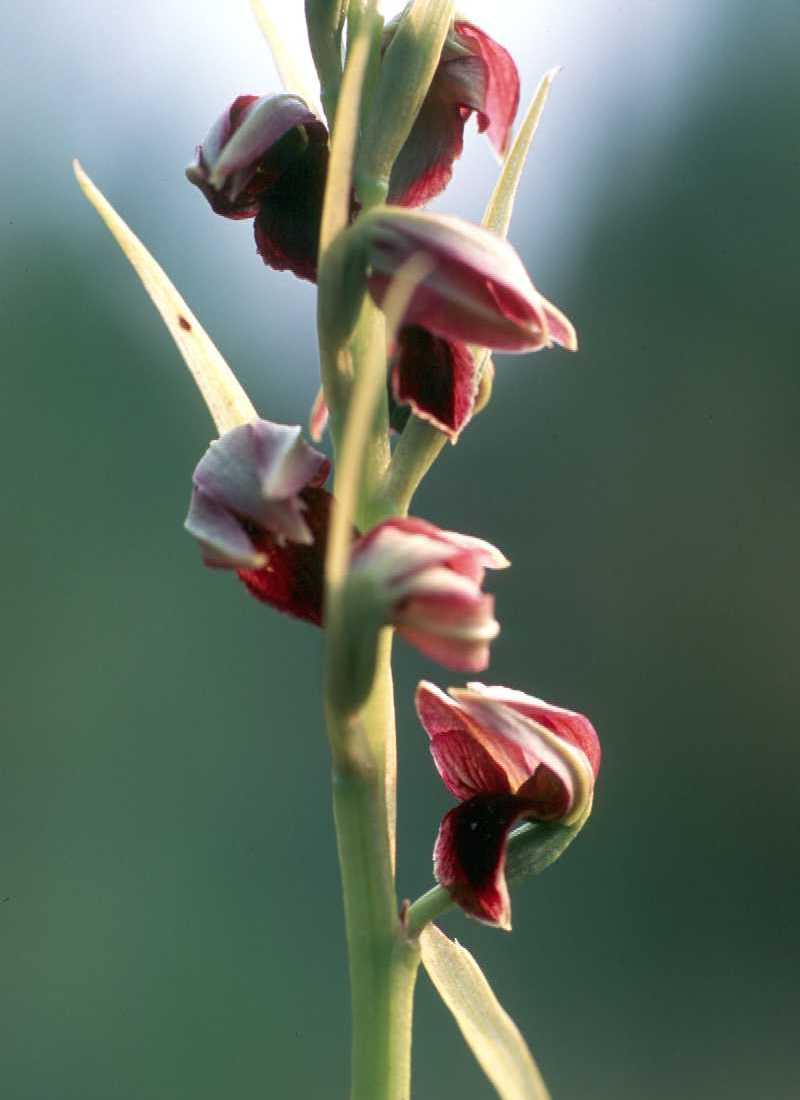

Conservation status
- Data Deficient (IUCN 3.1)

Scientific classification
- Kingdom: Plantae
- Clade: Tracheophytes
- Clade: Angiosperms
- Clade: Monocots
- Order: Asparagales
- Family: Orchidaceae
- Subfamily: Epidendroideae
- Genus: Eulophia
- Species: E. ecristata

Binomial name
- Eulophia ecristata (Fernald) Ames

Synonyms
- Cyrtopodium ecristatum Fernald; Cyrtopodium strictum Griseb.; Orthochilus ecristatus (Fernald) Bytebier; Orthochilus strictus (Griseb.) Greuter; Pteroglossaspis ecristata (Fernald) Rolfe; Triorchos ecristatus (Fernald) Small; Triorchos strictus (Griseb.) Acuña

= Eulophia ecristata =

Species of orchid

Eulophia ecristata, synonym Orthochilus ecristatus, or giant orchid, is a terrestrial species of orchid native to Cuba and to the southeastern United States (from Louisiana to North Carolina). In 2014, it was proposed that the species should be transferred to the genus Orthochilus, but as of December 2023 this was not accepted by Plants of the World Online. This is one of several species known as a "giant orchid".
