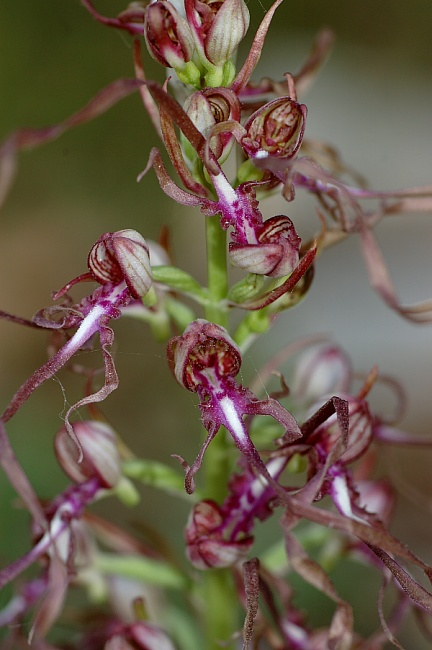

Scientific classification
- Kingdom: Plantae
- Clade: Tracheophytes
- Clade: Angiosperms
- Clade: Monocots
- Order: Asparagales
- Family: Orchidaceae
- Subfamily: Orchidoideae
- Genus: Himantoglossum
- Species: H. adriaticum

Binomial name
- Himantoglossum adriaticum H. Baumann

Synonyms
- Himantoglossum hircinum ssp. adriaticum (H. Baum.) Sunderm.; Himantoglossum adriaticum f. albiflorum Vöth

= Himantoglossum adriaticum =

Species of orchid

Himantoglossum adriaticum, the Adriatic lizard orchid, is a species of orchid native to Italy, Slovenia, Croatia, Austria, Czech Republic and Slovakia. It is Europe's tallest orchid, often reaching the height of 1 metre.
