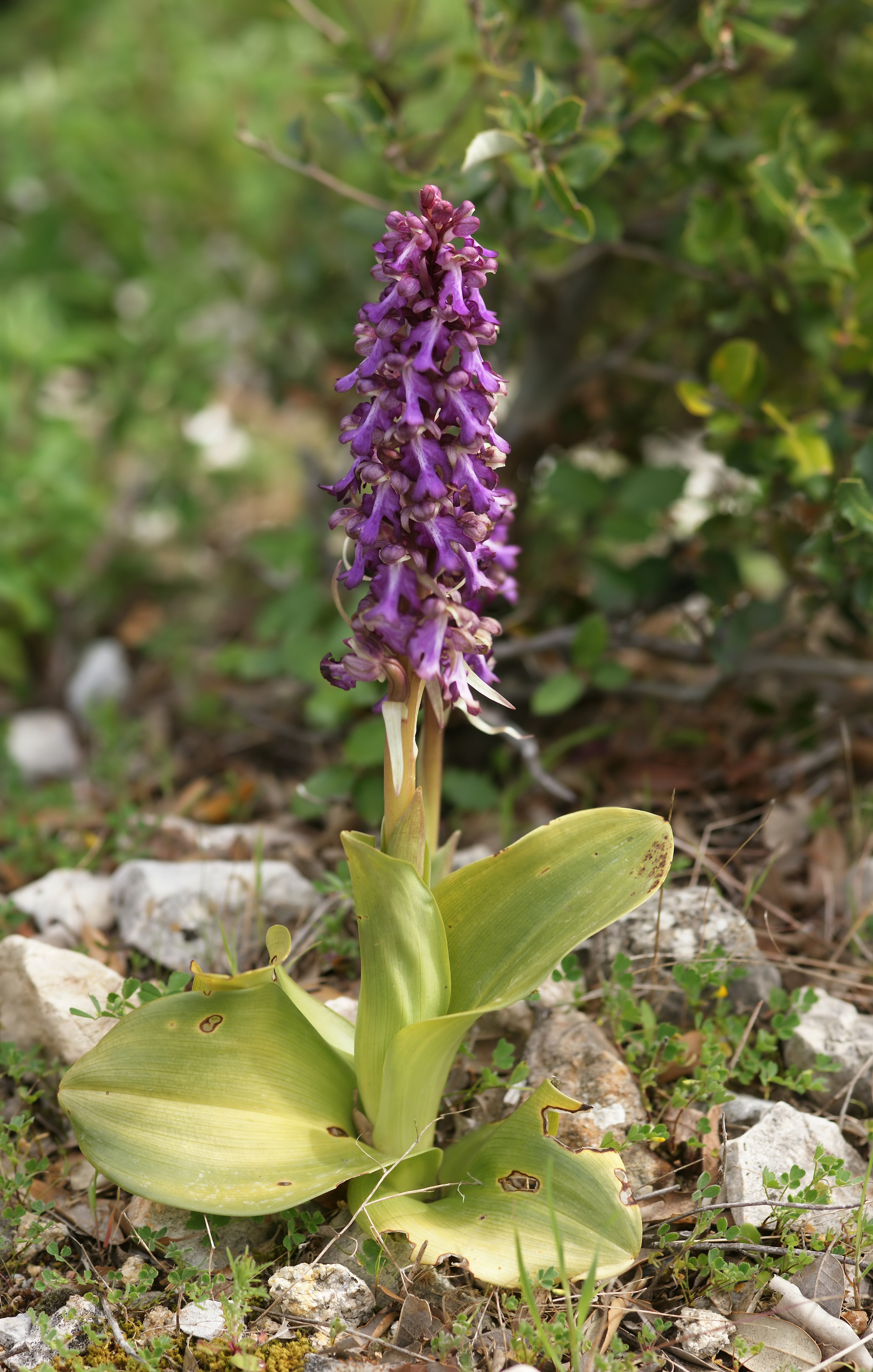

Conservation status
- Least Concern (IUCN 3.1)

Scientific classification
- Kingdom: Plantae
- Clade: Tracheophytes
- Clade: Angiosperms
- Clade: Monocots
- Order: Asparagales
- Family: Orchidaceae
- Subfamily: Orchidoideae
- Genus: Himantoglossum
- Species: H. robertianum

Binomial name
- Himantoglossum robertianum (Loisel.) P.Delforge

Synonyms
- Aceras longibracteatum Rchb.f.; Barlia longibracteata (Rchb.f.) Parl.; Barlia robertiana (Loisel.) Greuter; Barlia robertiana lusus candida Soó; Barlia robertiana f. sicula (Lindl.) Hervás, De Bellard, Calzado, J.C.Huertas, Reyes Carr. & Ruíz Cano; Himantoglossum longibracteatum (Rchb.f.) Schltr.; Himantoglossum robertianum f. candidum (Soó) F.M.Vázquez; Himantoglossum robertianum f. gallicum (Lindl.) F.M.Vázquez; Himantoglossum robertianum f. siculum (Lindl.) F.M.Vázquez; Loroglossum longibracteatum (Rchb.f.) Moris ex Ardoino; Orchis foliosa Masson ex Ker Gawl.; Orchis fragrans Ten.; Orchis longibracteata Biv.; Orchis longibracteata var. gallica Lindl.; Orchis longibracteata var. sicula Lindl.; Orchis robertiana Loisel.

= Himantoglossum robertianum =

Species of orchid

Himantoglossum robertianum is a species of flowering plant in the orchid family (Orchidaceae) native to the Mediterranean Basin. It is commonly known as the giant orchid.

== Description ==
Himantoglossum robertianum is a bulbous plant. It flowers from January to April. The bulb is edible when cooked.

== Distribution and habitat ==
Himantoglossum robertianum is native to the Mediterranean Basin and is found in Portugal, Morocco, Spain, Balearic Islands, France, Italy, Sardinia, Corsica, Algeria, Libya, Croatia, Montenegro, the Greek mainland, the Aegean Islands and Crete, Anatolia and Cyprus. It is found in short, poor grassland, garrigue, scrub, and open woodland. It prefers dry to moist, alkaline and calcareous substrates. It can be found up to 1,700 m (5,600 ft) altitude. The plant was found growing in Britain for the first time in 2022. It is believed that its distribution range is expanding due to the effects of climate change.

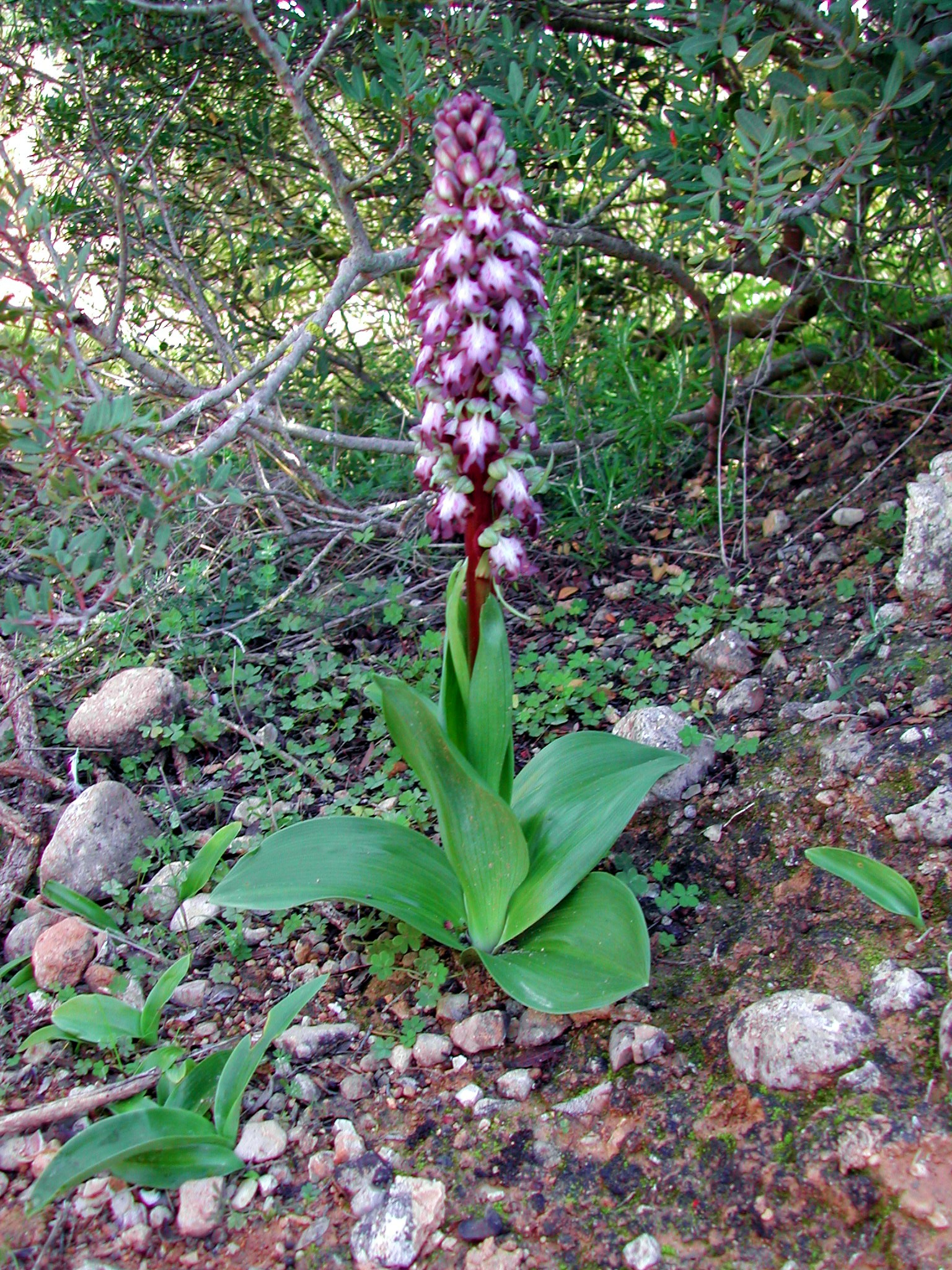

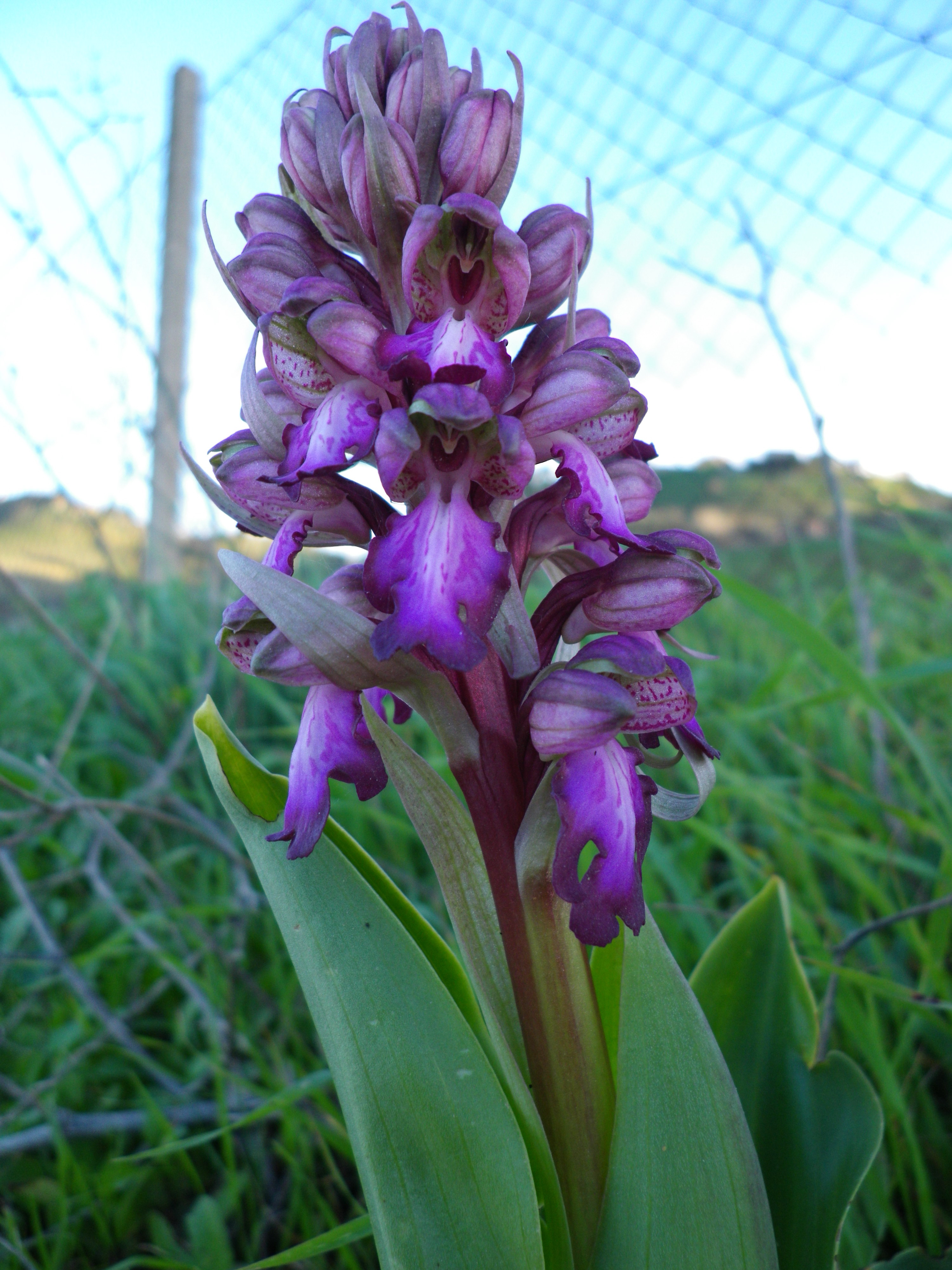
