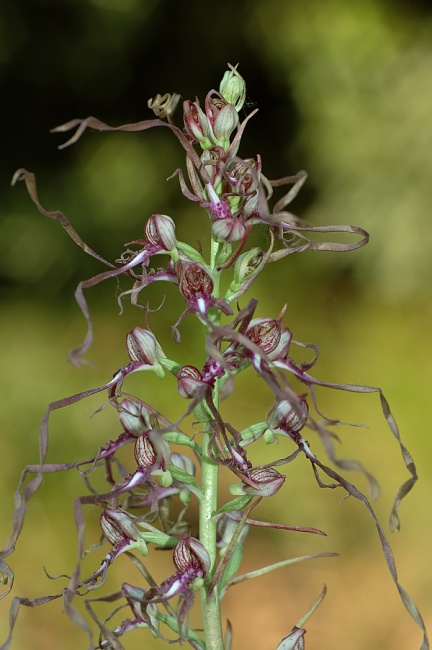
- Himantoglossum adriaticum

Scientific classification
- Kingdom: Plantae
- Clade: Embryophytes
- Clade: Tracheophytes
- Clade: Spermatophytes
- Clade: Angiosperms
- Clade: Monocots
- Order: Asparagales
- Family: Orchidaceae
- Subfamily: Orchidoideae
- Tribe: Orchideae
- Subtribe: Orchidinae
- Genus: Himantoglossum; Spreng.

Synonyms
- Barlia Parl.; Comperia K.Koch; × Comptoglossum Karatzas; Loroglossum Rich.

= Himantoglossum =

Genus of orchids

Himantoglossum is a genus of orchids native to the Canary Islands, Europe, southwest Asia and northern Africa. Its members generally have a labellum which is divided into three parts, of which the middle part is the longest.

The genera Comperia and Barlia are now included in Himantoglossum.

== Species ==
As of April 2014, the World Checklist of Selected Plant Families recognizes the following species:

- Himantoglossum adriaticum H.Baumann - Italy, Austria, Czech Republic
- Himantoglossum calcaratum (Beck) Schltr. - Greece, Bulgaria, European Turkey, former Yugoslavia
- Himantoglossum caprinum (M.Bieb.) Spreng.
  - Himantoglossum caprinum subsp. caprinum - Crimea, Iran, Iraq, Turkey, Palestine, Israel
- Himantoglossum comperianum (Steven) P.Delforge (syn. Comperia comperianum) - Crimea, Greek Islands, Turkey, Iran, Iraq, Syria, Lebanon, Palestine, Israel
- Himantoglossum formosum (Steven) K.Koch - Caucasus, Iran
- Himantoglossum galilaeum Shifman - Israel
- Himantoglossum hircinum (L.) Spreng. - Britain, Belgium, the Netherlands, France, Germany, Spain, Portugal and Morocco
- Himantoglossum jankae Somlyay, Kreutz & Óvári -Balkans, Greek islands, Turkey, Hungary, Slovakia
  - Himantoglossum jankae subsp. rumelicum (H.Baumann & R.Lorenz) J.Ponert - Czech Republic, former Yugoslavia, Greece and Turkey
- Himantoglossum metlesicsianum (W.P.Teschner) P.Delforge (syn. Barlia metlesicsiana) - Canary Islands
- Himantoglossum montis-tauri Kreutz & W.Lüders - Turkey, Greek Islands?
- Himantoglossum robertianum (Loisel.) P.Delforge (syn. Barlia robertianum) - Mediterranean from Portugal and Morocco east to Turkey
- Himantoglossum × samariense C.Alibertis & A.Alibertis - Crete
