= × Phragmipaphium =

Scientific classification
- Kingdom: Plantae
- Clade: Tracheophytes
- Clade: Angiosperms
- Clade: Monocots
- Order: Asparagales
- Family: Orchidaceae
- Subfamily: Cypripedioideae
- Genus: × Phragmipaphium hort.

Genus of flowering plants

× Phragmipaphium is an intergeneric hybrid of plants in the family Orchidaceae, between the genera Phragmipedium and Paphiopedilum. This hybrid is abbreviated Phrphm by orchid growers and hobbyists. A number of plants have been presented as successful hybrids.

== Registered hybrids ==
The following hybrid names have been registered with the Royal Horticultural Society:

- Phrphm. Charming Daughter; Registered by N. Toyoshima as Phrag. longifolium × Paph. henryanum
- Phrphm. Confusion; Registered by Dr./Mrs. W.W. Wilson (Mans./Hatcher) as Phrag. Grande × Paph. Memoria J. H. Walker
- Phrphm. Elisabeth Schrull; Registered by J. Werner as Paph. dayanum × Phrag. Sedenii
- Phrphm. Fourman's Freckles; Registered by T. Fourman (O/U) as Paph. bellatulum × Phrag. schlimii
- Phrphm. Fourman's Twilight; Registered by T. Fourman (O/U) as Phrag. schlimii × Paph. micranthum
- Phrphm. Hanes' Magic; Registered by J. Hanes as Paph. stonei × Phrag. Albopurpureum
- Phrphm. Malhouitri; Registered by Boullet as Paph. Harrisianum × Phrag. schlimii
- Phrphm. Unnamed 1; Registered by O/U as Phrag. besseae × Paph. micranthum
