= Guillermo Kalbreyer =

German plant collector

Wilhelm (Guillermo) Kalbreyer (1847–1912) was a German plant collector who was sent by James Veitch & Sons of Chelsea, London to collect new plants in West Africa and South America.

According to Hortus Veitchii, the Veitch family history:

Guillermo Kalbreyer, a promising young man, twenty-nine years of age, entered Messrs. Veitch's service as a plant-collector in 1876, and his first trip was to the West Coast of Africa in search of tropical flowering and foliage plants, very popular at that time.

== West Africa ==
Kalbreyer set off from Liverpool in November 1876 and arrived at the island of Fernando Po in the Gulf of Guinea on Christmas Eve before travelling on to Victoria in Cameroon a week later. His travels took him into neighbouring southern Nigeria, including exploring the coastal areas around Calabar and Bonny, as well as the Cameroon mountains and the Sanaga River basin. At that time travelling in the region was difficult, and, owing to the hostility of native traders, foreigners were unable to penetrate far into the country.

Whilst in Victoria, Kalbreyer met Rev. George Thomson, a Baptist missionary and amateur plant collector, who assisted him on his plant gathering expeditions.

In July 1877, after suffering from frequent attacks of malaria, Kalbreyer's health deteriorated and he returned to England, bringing with him a small collection of plants and seeds, including Adenorandia kalbreyeri (originally known as "Gardenia kalbreyeri"), five species of Mussaenda (a flowering plant in the family Rubiaceae) and two new orchids: Brachycorythis kalbreyeri, a terrestrial species named by Reichenbach after its discoverer, and Pachystoma thomsonianum, an epiphyte, named, at Kalbreyer's request, in honour of George Thomson. He also brought back seeds of Pararistolochia promissa which were successfully grown at Chelsea – this was described by Masters as, "one of the most extraordinary members of an extraordinary genus." The flowers extend into three tails, which sometimes reach a length of 2 feet.

== Colombia ==
Following the disappointment of Kalbreyer's first expedition, Harry Veitch decided to send Kalbreyer to Colombia "where the climate is delightful on the highlands and mountain-slopes, though in the lowlands and along the coast almost as hot as in parts of Africa". Kalbreyer departed in October 1877 and collected in the Eastern Cordillera near Ocaña, where he mostly collected various species of Odontoglossum, including Odontoglossum nobile and 0. spectatissimum.

In February 1878, he left Ocaña to return to England, travelling down the Magdalena River to the coast at Barranquilla. Because of the low state of the river, the passage to the coast was difficult and the journey (normally from seven to ten days) required nearly a month. Kalbreyer finally arrived in England at the end of April, by when more than half his collection was unusable.

He returned to Ocaña in July 1878, and he again proceeded to the Eastern Cordillera, through the towns of San Pedro, Salazar and Pamplona. Once again, he collected some extraordinary forms of Odontoglossum including 0. tripudians, 0. crocidipterum and the rare 0. blandum together with related species such as Oncidium hastilabium and Otoglossum chiriquense. After sending several consignments of orchids back to Chelsea, Kalbreyer returned to England, bringing with him a large collection of orchids. Kalbreyer was described as a "particularly conscientious collector" who always wrote lengthy reports on the habitats of the plants he collected. He was praised for his "judicious packing and careful superintendence of the transport" of the scarce Odontoglossum blandum which all arrived at Chelsea in good condition.

In September 1879, he again left England for Colombia, on this occasion travelling down the Magdalena River to the Central and Western Cordillera, and as far west as the Atrato River. According to the account in Hortus Veitchii, "passing from the water-shed of the Atrato to the plains, he was particularly struck by the richness of the vegetation", especially the luxuriant palm trees, of which he collected specimens of more than 100 species. Here he also collected samples of the giant arum, Anthurium veitchii, with leaves over six feet in length, which had been discovered by a previous Veitch employee, Gustav Wallis in 1874. On this expedition, Kalbreyer travelled throughout the province of Antioquia passing through the towns of Rionegro, Medellín, Santa Fe de Antioquia, Sopetrán, Frontino, Amalfi, Concordia and many others – en route, he collected more orchids, including Odontoglossum sceptrum, Miltonia vexillaria, Cattleya aurea, Phragmipedium longifolium, P. schlimii alba, and several species of Masdevallia.

After sending several consignments of orchids to Chelsea, Kalbreyer returned to England in September 1880, bringing with him many living plants and some 360 species of dried ferns, including eighteen new discoveries. These were described by John Gilbert Baker in the Journal of Botany for July 1881.

Kalbreyer's last journey as a plant-collector commenced in December 1880; on this occasion he again proceeded to Ocaña, where he arrived in January 1881, quickly sending home a further consignment of orchids. Leaving Ocaña at the end of the month, he went southwards to Cundinamarca and to Bogotá, on the high plains of the Eastern Cordillera. In this neighbourhood he collected more orchids, especially Odontoglossum crispum, which he brought safely to England in June 1881.

Following his return to England in 1881, his engagement with Veitch ended, and after a short stay he returned to Colombia, where he set up business in Bogotá as a nurseryman and exporter of orchids continuing to send interesting finds back to the Veitch Nurseries.

== Honours ==
Many plant species have been named after Kalbreyer, including:

- Adenorandia kalbreyeri (Hiern)
- Cyathea kalbreyeri (Baker)
- Columnea kalbreyeriana (Mast.)
- Cryosophila kalbreyeri (Dammer ex Burret)
- Dennstaedtia kalbreyeri (Maxon)
- Masdevallia kalbreyeri (Rchb. f. ex Kraenzl.)
- Maxillaria kalbreyeri (Rchb. f.)
- Paphinia rugosa var. kalbreyeri (Rchb. f.)
- Spathiphyllum kalbreyeri (Maxon)
- Wettinia kalbreyeri (Burret)

The palm genus, Kalbreyera, was named after Kalbreyer but the only species in the genus has now been re-classified as Geonoma triandra (Burret) Wess.Boer.

The small genus of Acanthus, Kalbreyeriella (Lindau) , found in Brazil, Colombia, Costa Rica, Ecuador, Panamá and Peru, also bears Kalbreyer's name.
