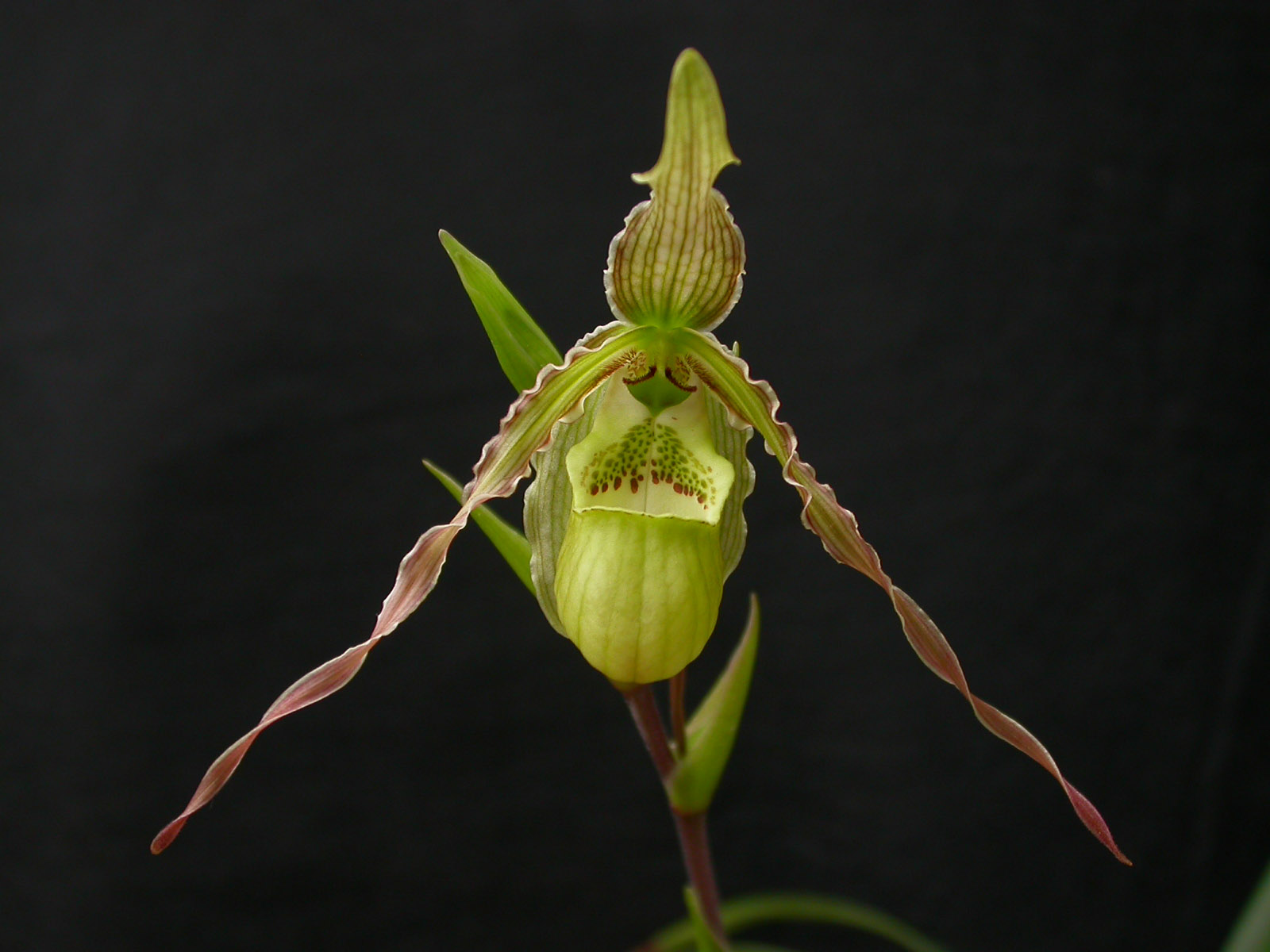
- Flower of Phragmipedium richteri

Conservation status
- Critically Endangered (IUCN 3.1)

Scientific classification
- Kingdom: Plantae
- Clade: Tracheophytes
- Clade: Angiosperms
- Clade: Monocots
- Order: Asparagales
- Family: Orchidaceae
- Subfamily: Cypripedioideae
- Genus: Phragmipedium
- Species: P. × richteri

Binomial name
- Phragmipedium × richteri Roeth & O.Gruss

= Phragmipedium × richteri =

Species of orchid

Phragmipedium × richteri is a natural hybrid (P. boissierianum × pearcei) of orchid endemic to Peru.
