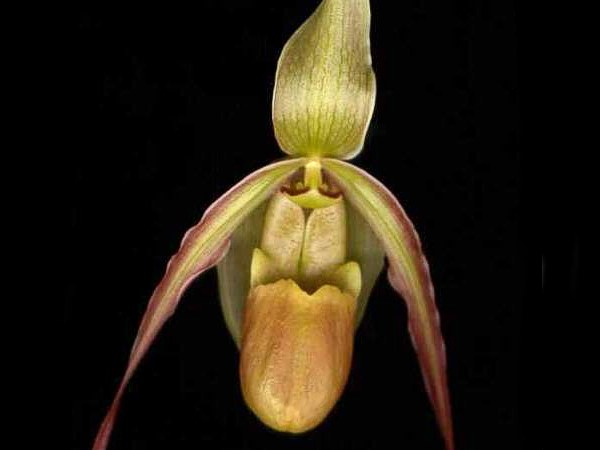
- Flower of Phragmipedium chapadense

Scientific classification
- Kingdom: Plantae
- Clade: Tracheophytes
- Clade: Angiosperms
- Clade: Monocots
- Order: Asparagales
- Family: Orchidaceae
- Subfamily: Cypripedioideae
- Genus: Phragmipedium
- Species: P. chapadense

Binomial name
- Phragmipedium chapadense Campacci & R.Takase

Synonyms
- Phragmipedium longifolium var. chapadense (Campacci & R.Takase) O.Gruss

= Phragmipedium chapadense =

Species of orchid

Phragmipedium chapadense is a species of orchid endemic to the Brazilian state Goiás and in a range between Costa Rica and Ecuador.
