= Cypripedium vittatum =

Cypripedium vittatum is a botanical synonym of two species of plant:

- Cypripedium parviflorum var. pubescens published in 1833 by Constantine Samuel Rafinesque
- Phragmipedium vittatum published in 1831 by José Mariano de Conceição Vellozo
