= Silver Slipper =

Silver Slipper or The Silver Slipper may refer to:

- Silver Slipper (Las Vegas), a casino in Las Vegas
- Silver Slipper (orchid), a common name for the orchid Paphiopedilum micranthum
- Silver Slipper (train), a railcar made by Budd–Michelin for the Texas and Pacific Railway
- The Silver Slipper, a 1901 musical by Leslie Stuart

== See also ==
- Silver Slipper Casino (Waveland), a casino in Hancock County, Mississippi,
- Silver Slipper Stakes, an Australian horse race
