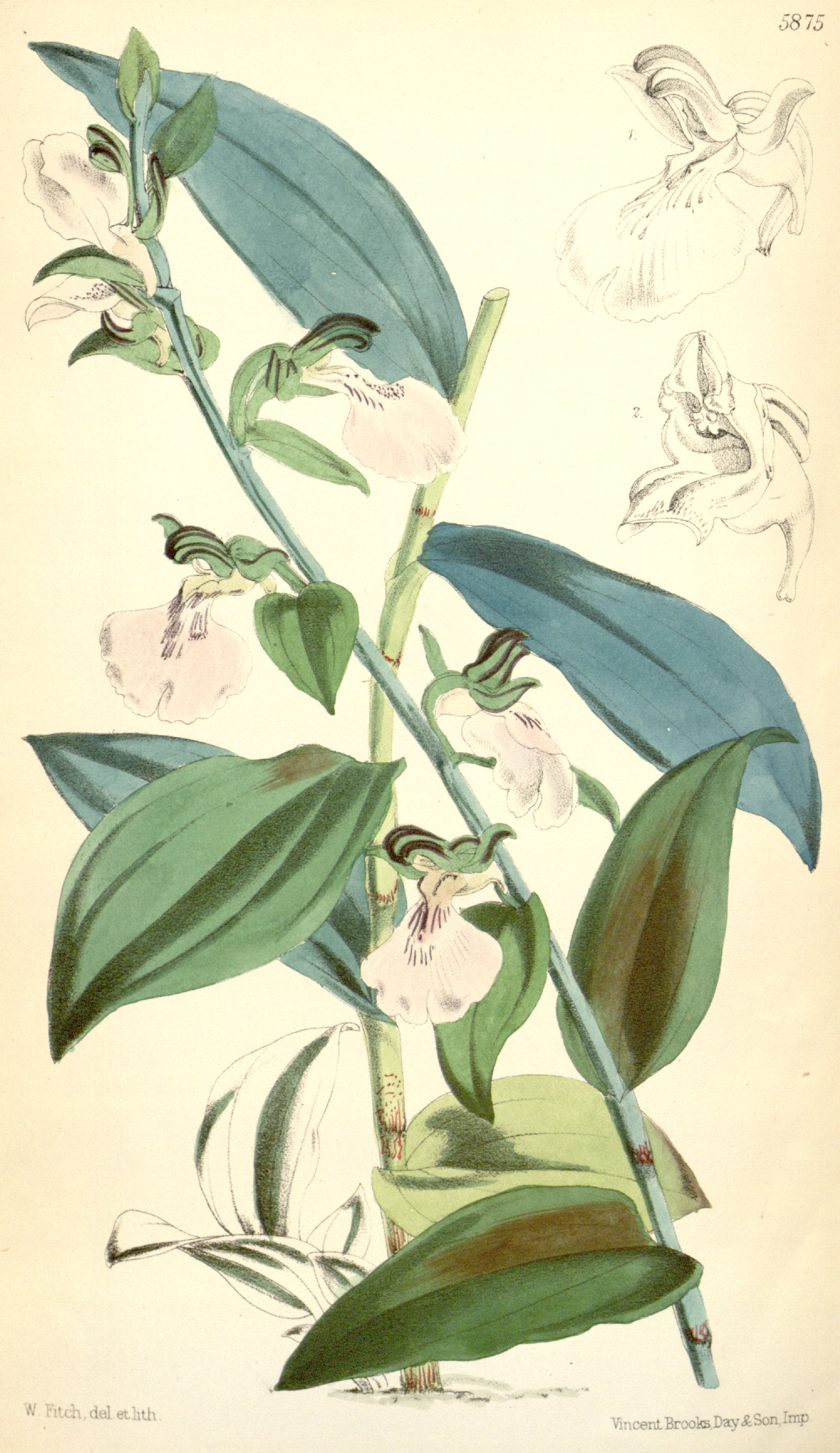

Scientific classification
- Kingdom: Plantae
- Clade: Tracheophytes
- Clade: Angiosperms
- Clade: Monocots
- Order: Asparagales
- Family: Orchidaceae
- Subfamily: Orchidoideae
- Tribe: Orchideae
- Subtribe: Orchidinae
- Genus: Brachycorythis; Lindl.

Synonyms
- Schwartzkopffia Kraenzl.; Phyllomphax Schltr.; Diplacorchis Schltr.; Gyaladenia Schltr.; Afrorchis Szlach.

= Brachycorythis =

Genus of flowering plants

Brachycorythis is a genus of flowering plants from the orchid family, Orchidaceae. It contains approximately 40-50 species native mostly to Africa and Madagascar but also some from South and East Asia (India, Thailand, China, etc.).

== Species ==
Brachycorythis species accepted by the Plants of the World Online as of July 2021:

- Brachycorythis acuta (Rchb.f.) Summerh.
- Brachycorythis angolensis (Schltr.) Schltr.
- Brachycorythis basifoliata Summerh.
- Brachycorythis buchananii (Schltr.) Rolfe
- Brachycorythis congoensis Kraenzl.
- Brachycorythis conica (Summerh.) Summerh.
- Brachycorythis disoides (Ridl.) Kraenzl.
- Brachycorythis friesii (Schltr.) Summerh.
- Brachycorythis galeandra (Rchb.f.) Summerh.
- Brachycorythis helferi (Rchb.f.) Summerh.
- Brachycorythis henryi (Schltr.) Summerh.
- Brachycorythis iantha (Wight) Summerh.
- Brachycorythis inhambanensis (Schltr.) Schltr.
- Brachycorythis kalbreyeri Rchb.f.
- Brachycorythis laotica (Gagnep.) Summerh.
- Brachycorythis lastii Rolfe
- Brachycorythis mac-owaniana Rchb.f.
- Brachycorythis macrantha (Lindl.) Summerh.
- Brachycorythis mixta Summerh.
- Brachycorythis neglecta H.A.Pedersen
- Brachycorythis obcordata (Lindl. ex Wall.) Summerh.
- Brachycorythis ovata Lindl.
- Brachycorythis paucifolia Summerh.
- Brachycorythis peitawuensis T.P.Lin & W.M.Lin
- Brachycorythis pilosa Summerh.
- Brachycorythis pleistophylla Rchb.f.
- Brachycorythis pubescens Harv.
- Brachycorythis pumilio (Lindl.) Rchb.f.
- Brachycorythis rhodostachys (Schltr.) Summerh.
- Brachycorythis sceptrum Schltr.
- Brachycorythis splendida Summerh.
- Brachycorythis tanganyikensis Summerh.
- Brachycorythis tenuior Rchb.f.
- Brachycorythis thorelii (Gagnep.) Summerh.
- Brachycorythis velutina Schltr.
- Brachycorythis wightii Summerh.
- Brachycorythis youngii (Szlach., Mytnik, Rutk., Jerch. & Baranow) J.M.H.Shaw

== See also ==
- List of Orchidaceae genera
