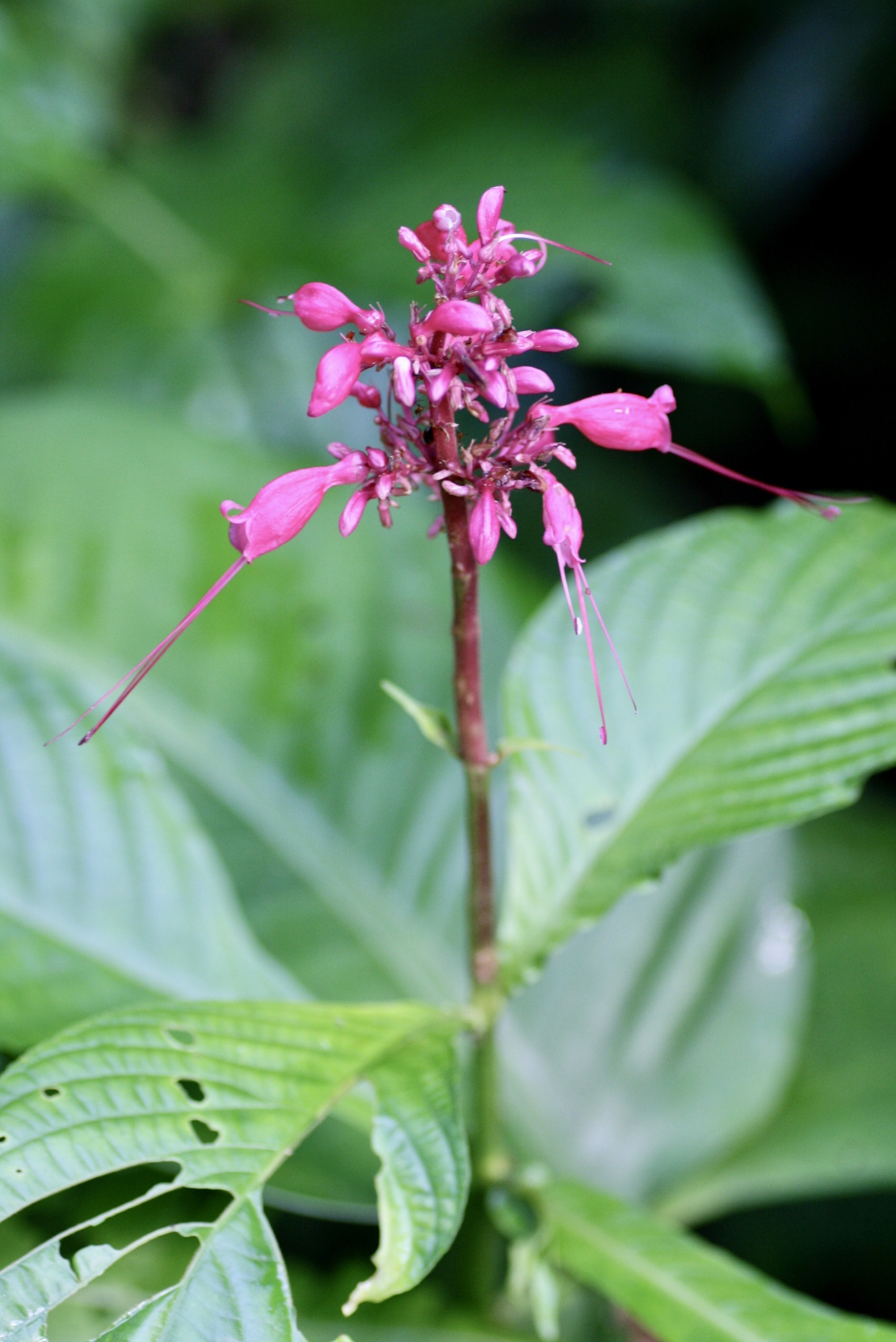
- Stenostephanus longistaminus

Scientific classification
- Kingdom: Plantae
- Clade: Tracheophytes
- Clade: Angiosperms
- Clade: Eudicots
- Clade: Asterids
- Order: Lamiales
- Family: Acanthaceae
- Subfamily: Acanthoideae
- Tribe: Justicieae
- Genus: Stenostephanus; Nees (1847)

Synonyms
- Cylindrosolen Kuntze (1903); Cylindrosolenium Lindau (1897); Galeottia Nees (1847), nom. illeg.; Gastranthus Moritz ex Benth. (1876); Glockeria Nees (1847), nom. illeg.; Habracanthus Nees (1847); Hansteinia Oerst. (1855); Kalbreyeracanthus Wassh. (1981); Kalbreyeriella Lindau (1922); Kolobochilus Lindau (1900); Razisea Oerst. (1855); Syringidium Lindau (1922), nom. illeg.

= Stenostephanus =

Genus of flowering plants

Stenostephanus is a genus of plants in the family Acanthaceae. It includes 94 species native to the tropical Americas, ranging from northeastern Mexico to Bolivia and southeastern Brazil.

== Species ==
Species accepted by the Plants of the World Online as of January 2024:

- Stenostephanus aglaus (Leonard) J.R.I.Wood
- Stenostephanus alushii T.F.Daniel
- Stenostephanus ampelinus (Leonard) J.R.I.Wood
- Stenostephanus anderssonii Wassh.
- Stenostephanus antiquorum J.R.I.Wood
- Stenostephanus asplundii (Wassh.) Wassh.
- Stenostephanus atrocalyx J.R.I.Wood
- Stenostephanus atropurpureus (Lindau) J.R.I.Wood
- Stenostephanus azureus (D.N.Gibson) T.F.Daniel
- Stenostephanus blepharorhachis (Lindau) T.F.Daniel ex Hammel
- Stenostephanus borarum J.R.I.Wood & R.Villanueva
- Stenostephanus breedlovei T.F.Daniel
- Stenostephanus brevistamineus R.Villanueva & J.R.I.Wood
- Stenostephanus cabrerae (Leonard) T.F.Daniel, McDade & Kiel
- Stenostephanus charien (Leonard) J.R.I.Wood
- Stenostephanus charitopes (Leonard) J.R.I.Wood
- Stenostephanus chavesii Hammel
- Stenostephanus chiapensis T.F.Daniel
- Stenostephanus citrinus (D.N.Gibson) McDade & Hammel
- Stenostephanus clarkii Wassh.
- Stenostephanus cleefii (Wassh.) J.R.I.Wood
- Stenostephanus cochabambensis Wassh.
- Stenostephanus crenulatus (Britton ex Rusby) Wassh.
- Stenostephanus cuatrecasasii (Leonard) J.R.I.Wood
- Stenostephanus cuscoensis J.R.I.Wood
- Stenostephanus cyaneus (Lindau) J.R.I.Wood
- Stenostephanus davidsonii Wassh.
- Stenostephanus densiflorus J.R.I.Wood
- Stenostephanus diversicolor (Lindau) J.R.I.Wood
- Stenostephanus enarthrocoma (Leonard) J.R.I.Wood
- Stenostephanus ericae (Mildbr. ex Wassh.) J.R.I.Wood & R.Villanueva
- Stenostephanus florifer (Leonard) J.R.I.Wood
- Stenostephanus gigas (Leonard) T.F.Daniel, McDade & Kiel
- Stenostephanus glaber (Leonard) T.F.Daniel
- Stenostephanus gracilis (Oerst.) T.F.Daniel
- Stenostephanus guerrerensis T.F.Daniel
- Stenostephanus haematodes (Schltdl.) T.F.Daniel
- Stenostephanus harleyi (Wassh.) T.F.Daniel
- Stenostephanus hispidulus (Leonard) J.R.I.Wood
- Stenostephanus holm-nielsenii Wassh.
- Stenostephanus hondurensis T.F.Daniel
- Stenostephanus jamesonii (Wassh.) Wassh.
- Stenostephanus kirkbridei (Wassh.) J.R.I.Wood
- Stenostephanus krukoffii Wassh.
- Stenostephanus lamprus (Leonard) J.R.I.Wood
- Stenostephanus lasiostachyus Nees
- Stenostephanus latifolius (Wassh.) J.R.I.Wood
- Stenostephanus latilabris (D.N.Gibson) T.F.Daniel
- Stenostephanus laxus (Wassh.) Wassh.
- Stenostephanus leiorhachis (Lindau) Hammel
- Stenostephanus leonardianus (J.R.I.Wood) J.R.I.Wood
- Stenostephanus lobeliiformis Nees
- Stenostephanus longistaminus (Ruiz & Pav.) V.M.Baum
- Stenostephanus lugonis (Wassh.) Wassh.
- Stenostephanus luteynii (Wassh.) Wassh.
- Stenostephanus lyman-smithii Wassh.
- Stenostephanus macrochilus (Lindau) J.R.I.Wood
- Stenostephanus macrolobus (Lindau) J.R.I.Wood
- Stenostephanus madidiensis J.R.I.Wood
- Stenostephanus madrensis T.F.Daniel
- Stenostephanus magdalenensis (Wassh.) J.R.I.Wood
- Stenostephanus maximus (J.R.I.Wood) J.R.I.Wood
- Stenostephanus monolophus (Donn.Sm.) T.F.Daniel
- Stenostephanus oaxacanus T.F.Daniel
- Stenostephanus pilosus (Leonard) J.R.I.Wood
- Stenostephanus puberulus Lindau
- Stenostephanus purpusii (Brandegee) T.F.Daniel
- Stenostephanus putumayensis (Leonard) J.R.I.Wood
- Stenostephanus pycnostachys (Leonard) J.R.I.Wood
- Stenostephanus pyramidalis (Lindau) Wassh.
- Stenostephanus racemosus (J.R.I.Wood) J.R.I.Wood
- Stenostephanus reflexiflorus (Leonard) J.R.I.Wood
- Stenostephanus ruberrimus (D.N.Gibson) T.F.Daniel
- Stenostephanus sanguineus (Nees) Wassh.
- Stenostephanus scolnikae (Leonard) J.R.I.Wood
- Stenostephanus sehuencasii J.R.I.Wood
- Stenostephanus sessilifolius (Oerst.) T.F.Daniel
- Stenostephanus silvaticus (Nees) T.F.Daniel
- Stenostephanus spicatus Wassh. & J.R.I.Wood
- Stenostephanus sprucei (Lindau) Wassh. & J.R.I.Wood
- Stenostephanus strictus (Leonard) T.F.Daniel ex Hammel
- Stenostephanus suburceolatus J.R.I.Wood
- Stenostephanus syscius (Leonard) J.R.I.Wood
- Stenostephanus tacanensis (Acosta & R.Fernández) T.F.Daniel
- Stenostephanus tachirensis (Wassh.) J.R.I.Wood
- Stenostephanus tenellus Wassh. & J.R.I.Wood
- Stenostephanus ventricosus (Donn.Sm.) T.F.Daniel ex Hammel & McDade
- Stenostephanus villosus (Gómez-Laur. & Hammel) McDade
- Stenostephanus wallnoeferi Wassh.
- Stenostephanus wasshausenii J.R.I.Wood
- Stenostephanus wilburii (McDade) McDade
- Stenostephanus xanthothrix (Leonard) J.R.I.Wood
- Stenostephanus zuliensis (Wassh.) J.R.I.Wood

== Taxonomy ==
Many genera are now considered synonyms of Stenostephanus. Kalbreyeriella, first described in 1922, was named in honour of Guillermo Kalbreyer (1847–1912), a German plant collector who was sent by James Veitch & Sons of Chelsea, London, to collect new plants in West Africa and South America.
