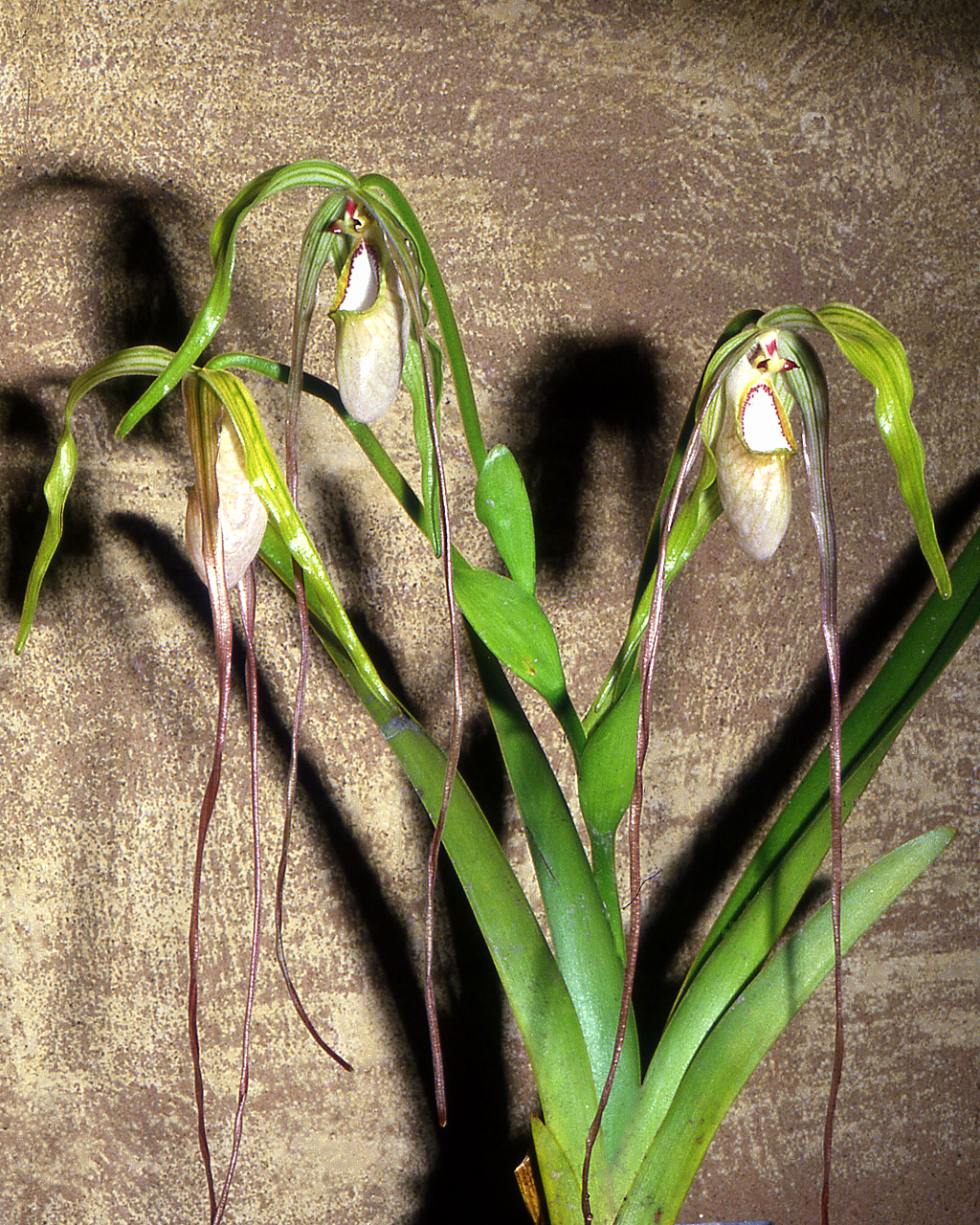
- Flower of Phragmipedium warszewiczianum

Scientific classification
- Kingdom: Plantae
- Clade: Tracheophytes
- Clade: Angiosperms
- Clade: Monocots
- Order: Asparagales
- Family: Orchidaceae
- Subfamily: Cypripedioideae
- Genus: Phragmipedium
- Species: P. warszewiczianum

Binomial name
- Phragmipedium warszewiczianum (Rchb.f.) Schltr.

Synonyms
- Cypripedium warszewiczianum Rchb.f.; Cypripedium wallisii Rchb.f.; Selenipedium wallisii (Rchb.f.) Rchb.f.; Selenipedium wallisii (Rchb.f.) Linden; Phragmipedium caudatum var. wallisii (Rchb.f.) Stein; Paphiopedilum wallisii (Rchb.f.) Pfitzer; Phragmipedium wallisii (Rchb.f.) Garay

= Phragmipedium warszewiczianum =

Species of orchid

Phragmipedium warszewiczianum is a species of orchid occurring from Colombia to Ecuador.
