= Stenostephanus brevistamineus =

Scientific classification
- Kingdom: Plantae
- Clade: Tracheophytes
- Clade: Angiosperms
- Clade: Eudicots
- Clade: Asterids
- Order: Lamiales
- Family: Acanthaceae
- Genus: Stenostephanus
- Species: S. brevistamineus

Binomial name
- Stenostephanus brevistamineus R.Villanueva & J.R.I.Wood (2022)

Plant species

Stenostephanus brevistamineus is a species of flowering plant first collected 11 July 2013 in Junín, Peru. Stenostephanus is a genus in the plant family of Acanthaceae. The species holotype is housed at HOXA, with isotypes at MO and USM.

== Description ==
Stephanostephanus brevistamineus is a perennial subshrub, to c. 1 m tall. Stem is erect, simple below, much-branched above, quadrangular, glabrous, the nodes swollen. Leaves slightly unequal in each pair, petiolate, glabrous; lamina membranaceous, 3.8 – 10.5 × 0.8 – 3.5 cm, oblong-elliptic, apex acuminate, base acute, margin entire, slightly undulate, venation camptodromous, lateral veins 6 – 8 pairs, adaxially, green, with numerous small cystoliths and impressed veins, abaxially shiny, veins prominent, reticulate; petiole 0.2 – 1.3 cm long. Inflorescence a pedunculate, ovoid, lavender terminal thyrse, 3 – 8 × 5 cm; peduncle 1 – 6 cm long, pubescent; rachis densely glandular-pubescent, the flowers arranged in opposite-decussate 3-flowered dichasia, the central flower subsessile, the laterals pedicellate with terete, pubescent pedicels to 2 mm in length; bracts at branching points 2 – 2.5 mm long, deltoid, acute, glabrous or nearly so; bracteoles 1.5 – 3 mm long, equal, linear, puberulent; calyx subequally 5-lobed to near the base, lobes linear, acuminate often with recurved apex, 7 – 8.5 × 0.5 mm, shortly puberulent, light green; corolla obscurely 2-lipped, subequally 4-lobed, 7 – 7.5 mm long, lavender; tube 4 – 6 mm long, 1 – 1.5 mm diam, ±equalling lobes, glabrous; lobes 4.5 – 5 × 1 mm, oblong, rounded, equal, glabrous; stamens 2, filaments glabrous, 3 mm long; anthers 2 mm long, muticous, glabrous, held at corolla mouth; style c. 6 mm, glabrous; stigma head subglobose, flattened; ovary pubescent. Capsule 10 – 11 × 2.5 mm, clavate, densely pubescent; seeds 4, 1 × 1 mm, elliptic, yellowish-brown, muricate. This species is distinguished in part by the pyramidal thyrse, which is almost entirely lavender in color.

== Habitat ==
The genus Stenostephanus ranges from the southern portion of Mexico through Central America. Stenostephanus brevistamineus is a perennial herb endemic to the Otishi National Park in the Rio Tambo district (Junín, Peru) at 2060 m. It grows in undisturbed montane sclerophyllous forests with humus-enriched soils. 11°22'28"S 73°59'28"W.

== Conservation ==
Currently, S. brevistamineus has only been found at Otishi National Park. The area suffers from habitat destruction due to human interference with natural resources in the surrounding area. There are few explorations to the National Park site. More information is needed, therefore, the species is currently assigned the category Data Deficient (DD) according to IUCN.
