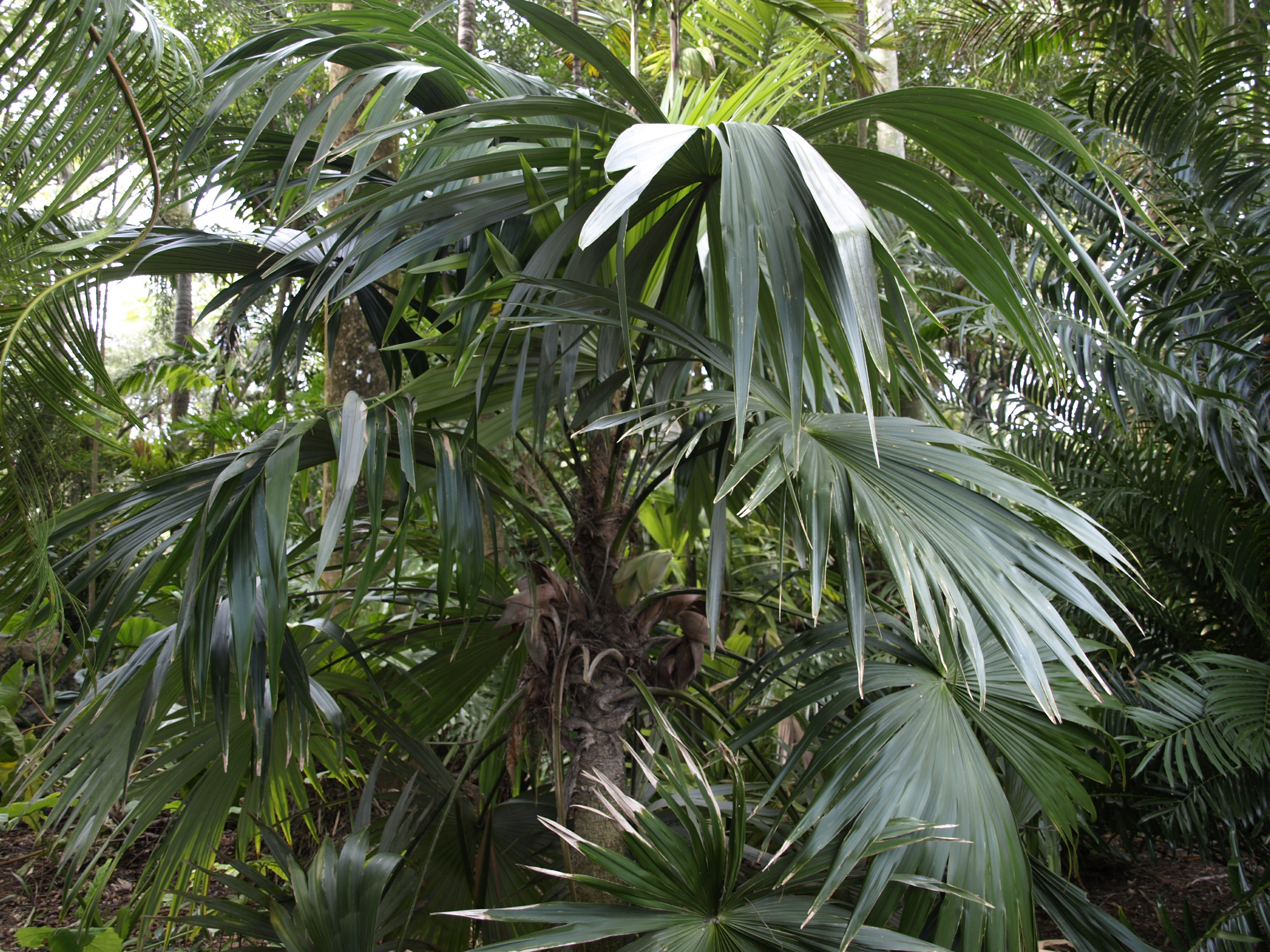

Conservation status
- Near Threatened (IUCN 2.3)

Scientific classification
- Kingdom: Plantae
- Clade: Tracheophytes
- Clade: Angiosperms
- Clade: Monocots
- Clade: Commelinids
- Order: Arecales
- Family: Arecaceae
- Genus: Cryosophila
- Species: C. kalbreyeri

Binomial name
- Cryosophila kalbreyeri (Dammer ex Burret) Dahlgren

= Cryosophila kalbreyeri =

Species of palm

Cryosophila kalbreyeri is a species of flowering plant in the family Arecaceae. It is found in Colombia and Panama. It is threatened by habitat loss.

The plant is named after the Victorian plant collector, Guillermo Kalbreyer (1847 – 1912).
