= Brachycorythis kalbreyeri =

Scientific classification
- Kingdom: Plantae
- Clade: Tracheophytes
- Clade: Angiosperms
- Clade: Monocots
- Order: Asparagales
- Family: Orchidaceae
- Subfamily: Orchidoideae
- Genus: Brachycorythis
- Species: B. kalbreyeri

Binomial name
- Brachycorythis kalbreyeri Rchb.f.

Species of orchid

Brachycorythis kalbreyeri is a species of flowering plant in the family Orchidaceae. It is endemic to Equatorial Africa and was first discovered on Mount Cameroon by Guillermo Kalbreyer. It was subsequently named after Kalbreyer by Heinrich Gustav Reichenbach. The species is unique from others in its genus due to its semi-epiphytic growth habit. Most species in the genus Brachycorythis are terrestrial. Brachycorythis kalbreyeri, however, can be found growing on trees near streams, on fallen logs, or mossy tree branches. During the dry season, the species loses its leaves. When the wet season returns the species sends out new growth and eventually flowers. The flowers are 5 cm across and the species can produce up to about 15 flowers. The sepals of the flower are white and the petals have a purplish color over a white background. The lip shares this coloration except that towards the column the lip changes to a bright shade of yellow. The flowers produce a spicy scent.
