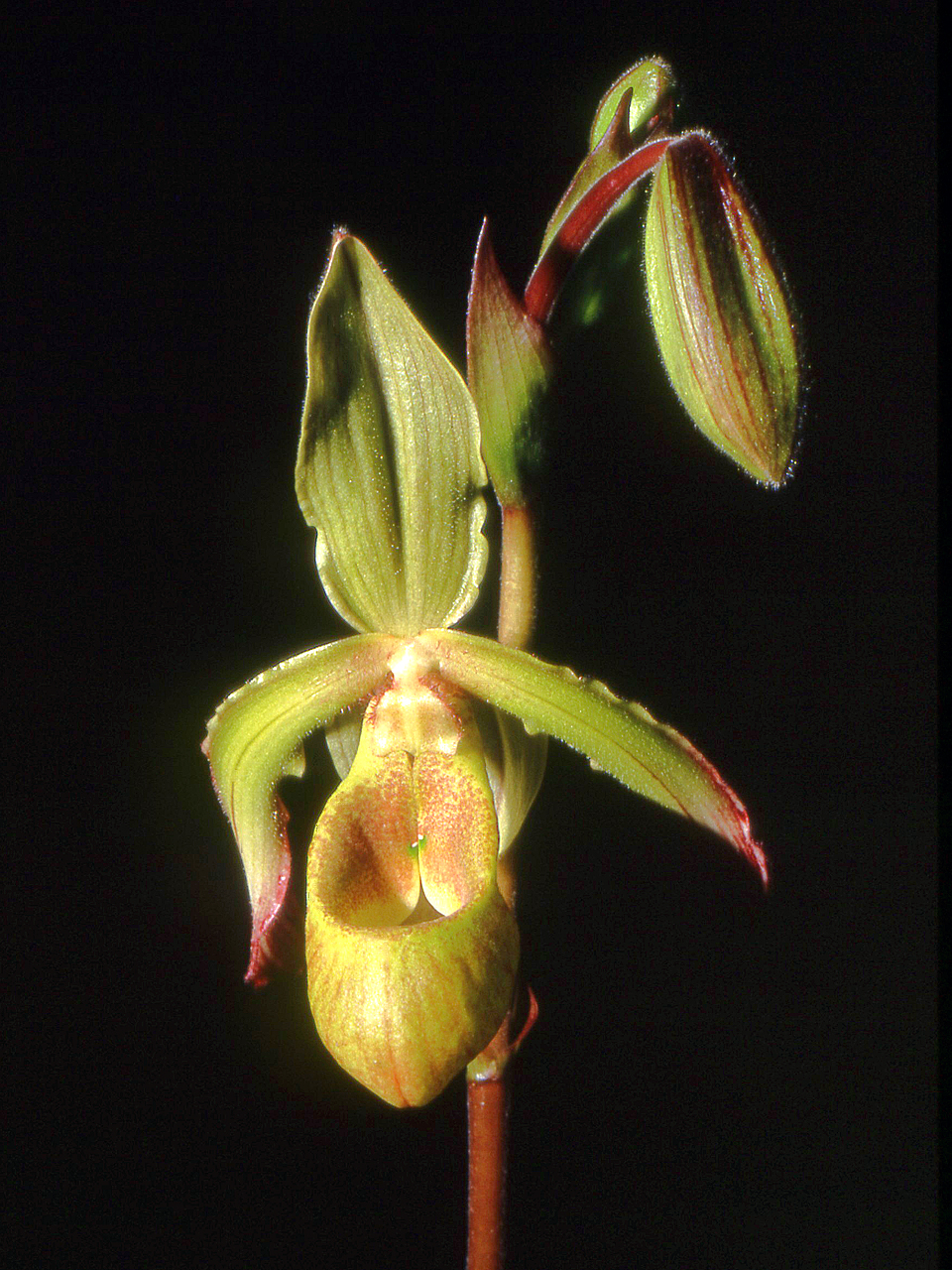
- Flower of Phragmipedium lindleyanum

Scientific classification
- Kingdom: Plantae
- Clade: Embryophytes
- Clade: Tracheophytes
- Clade: Spermatophytes
- Clade: Angiosperms
- Clade: Monocots
- Order: Asparagales
- Family: Orchidaceae
- Subfamily: Cypripedioideae
- Genus: Phragmipedium
- Species: P. lindleyanum

Binomial name
- Phragmipedium lindleyanum (M.R.Schomb. ex Lindl.) Rolfe

Synonyms
- Cypripedium lindleyanum M.R.Schomb. ex Lindl.; Selenipedium lindleyanum (M.R.Schomb. ex Lindl.) Rchb.f.; Paphiopedilum lindleyanum (M.R.Schomb. ex Lindl.) Pfitzer; Selenipedium kaieteurium N.E.Br.; Selenipedium sargentianum Rolfe; Phragmipedium sargentianum (Rolfe) Rolfe; Cypripedium sargentianum (Rolfe) Kraenzl.; Phragmipedium kaieteurum (N.E.Br.) Garay; Paphiopedilum sargentianum (Rolfe) V.A.Albert & Börge Pett.; Paphiopedilum kaieteurum (N.E.Br.) V.A.Albert & Börge Pett.; Phragmipedium lindleyanum var. sargentianum (Rolfe) O.Gruss

= Phragmipedium lindleyanum =

Species of orchid

Phragmipedium lindleyanum is a species of orchid ranging from northern South America to Brazil (Pernambuco).
