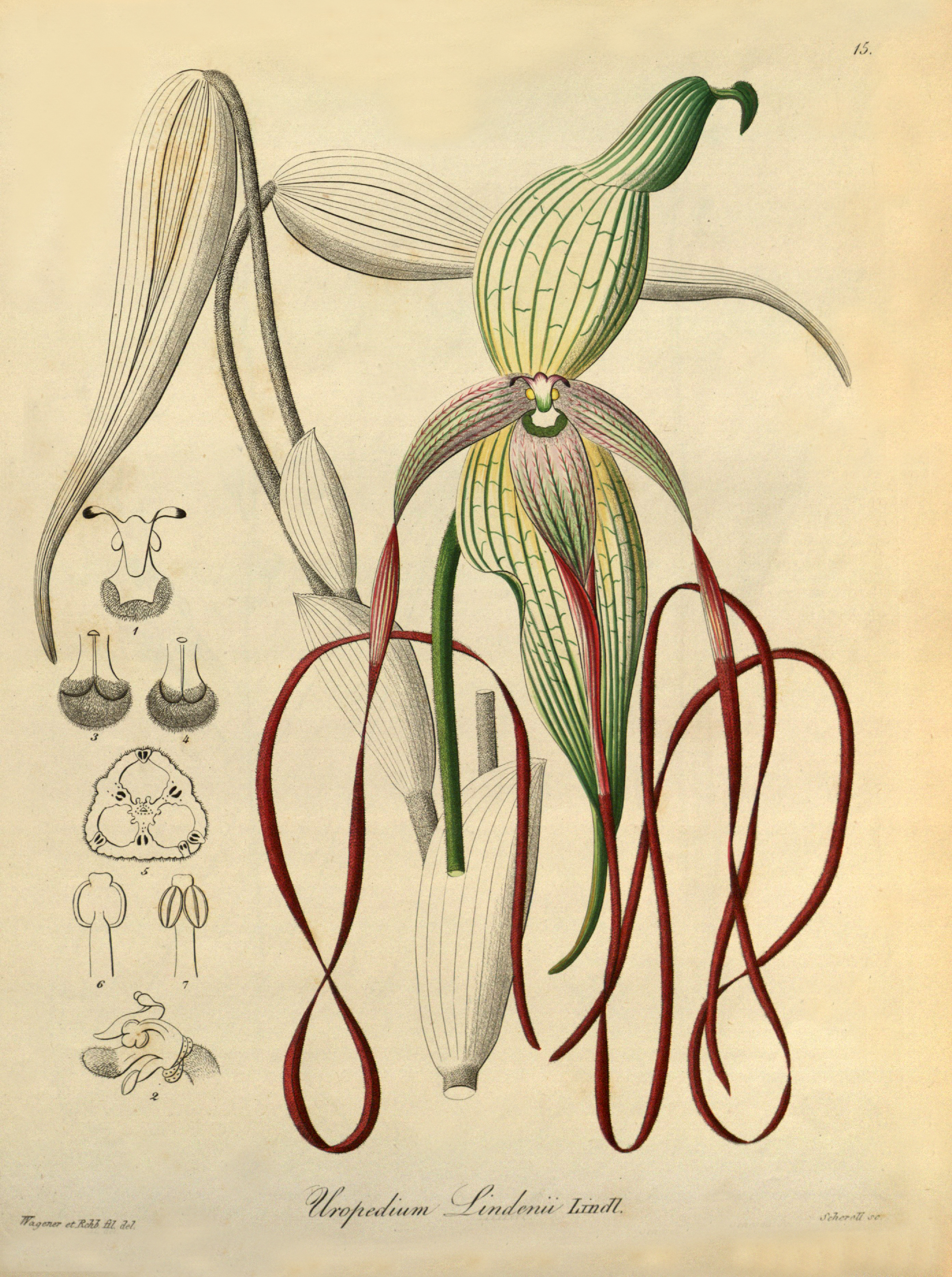
- Illustration of Phragmipedium lindenii

Conservation status
- Least Concern (IUCN 3.1)

Scientific classification
- Kingdom: Plantae
- Clade: Tracheophytes
- Clade: Angiosperms
- Clade: Monocots
- Order: Asparagales
- Family: Orchidaceae
- Subfamily: Cypripedioideae
- Genus: Phragmipedium
- Species: P. lindenii

Binomial name
- Phragmipedium lindenii (Lindl.) Dressler & N.H.Williams

Synonyms
- Uropedium lindenii Lindl.; Cypripedium lindenii (Lindl.) Van Houtte; Selenipedium lindenii (Lindl.) G.Nicholson; Phragmipedium caudatum var. lindenii (Lindl.) Pfitzer; Selenipedium caudatum var. lindenii (Lindl.) Rolfe; Paphiopedilum lindenii (Lindl.) V.A.Albert & Börge Pett.

= Phragmipedium lindenii =

Species of orchid

Phragmipedium lindenii is a species of orchid (family Orchidaceae) found from Venezuela to Ecuador. It is a lithophyte (rock dwelling plant). It is unique among orchids in being actinomorphic (radially symmetrical); the lip being indistinguishable from the other petals, and there being three stamens instead of the usual one or two stamens as in its nearest relative Phragmapedium wallisii which like all other orchids is zygomorphic (bilaterally symmetrical).
