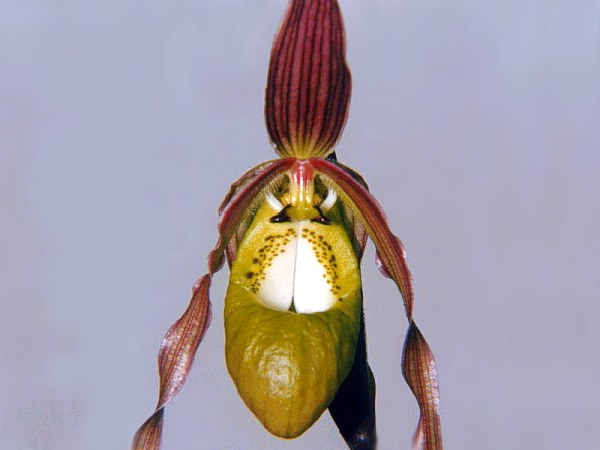
- Flower of Phragmipedium klotzschianum

Scientific classification
- Kingdom: Plantae
- Clade: Tracheophytes
- Clade: Angiosperms
- Clade: Monocots
- Order: Asparagales
- Family: Orchidaceae
- Subfamily: Cypripedioideae
- Genus: Phragmipedium
- Species: P. klotzschianum

Binomial name
- Phragmipedium klotzschianum (Rchb.f.) Rolfe

Synonyms
- Cypripedium klotzschianum Rchb.f.; Selenipedium klotzschianum (Rchb.f.) Rchb.f.; Cypripedium schomburgkianum Klotzsch ex M.R.Schomb.; Selenipedium schomburgkianum (Klotzsch ex M.R.Schomb.) Desbois; Paphiopedilum klotzschianum (Rchb.f.) Stein

= Phragmipedium klotzschianum =

Species of orchid

Phragmipedium klotzschianum is a species of orchid found from southeastern Venezuela to Guyana and northern Brazil.
