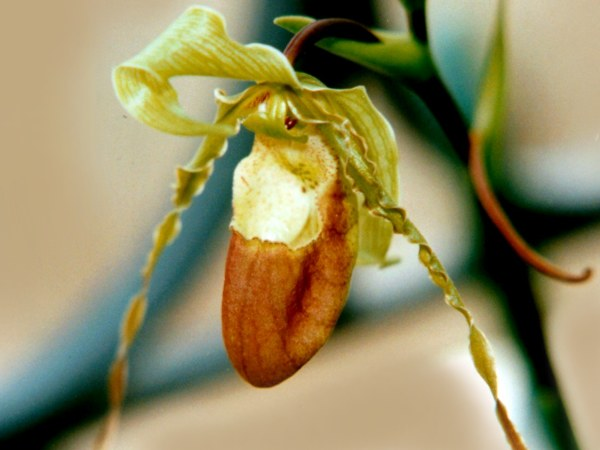
- Flower of Phragmipedium hirtzii

Scientific classification
- Kingdom: Plantae
- Clade: Tracheophytes
- Clade: Angiosperms
- Clade: Monocots
- Order: Asparagales
- Family: Orchidaceae
- Subfamily: Cypripedioideae
- Genus: Phragmipedium
- Species: P. hirtzii

Binomial name
- Phragmipedium hirtzii Dodson

Synonyms
- Paphiopedilum hirtzii (Dodson) V.A.Albert & Börge Pett.

= Phragmipedium hirtzii =

Species of orchid

Phragmipedium hirtzii is a species of orchid endemic to north western Ecuador and southwestern Colombia.
