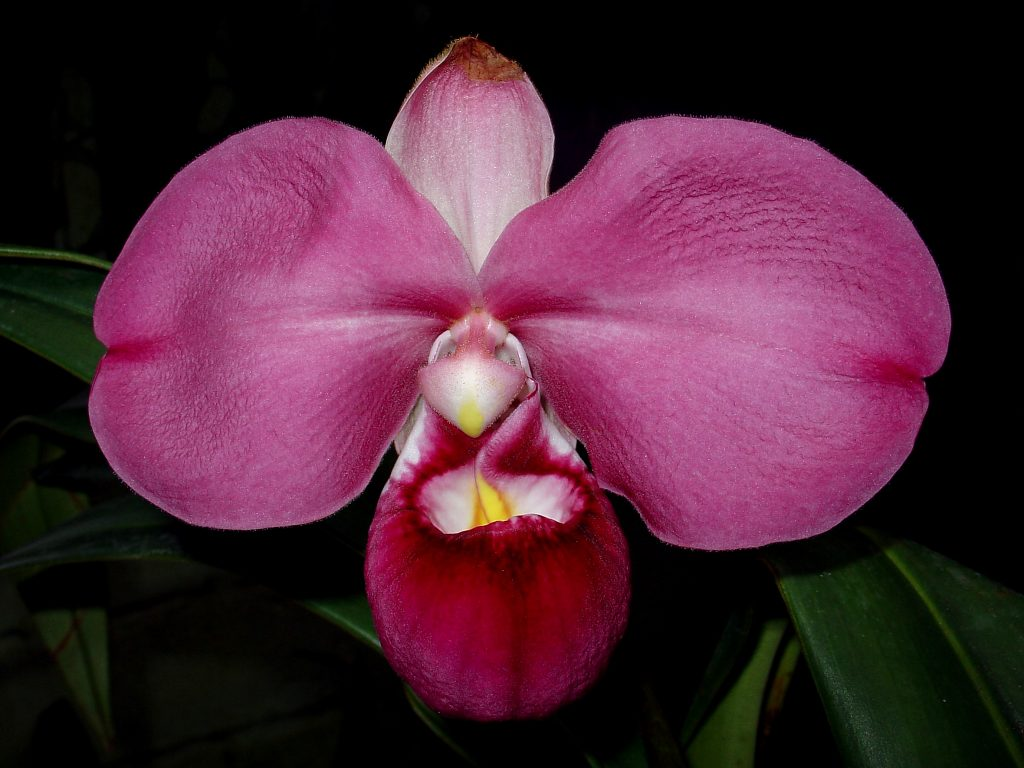

Conservation status
- Critically Endangered (IUCN 3.1)

Scientific classification
- Kingdom: Plantae
- Clade: Tracheophytes
- Clade: Angiosperms
- Clade: Monocots
- Order: Asparagales
- Family: Orchidaceae
- Subfamily: Cypripedioideae
- Genus: Phragmipedium
- Species: P. kovachii

Binomial name
- Phragmipedium kovachii J.T.Atwood, Dalström & Ric.Fernández

Synonyms
- Phragmipedium peruvianum Christenson

= Phragmipedium kovachii =

Species of plant

Phragmipedium kovachii is an orchid species found to be new to science in 2001, native to the Andean cloud forests of northern Peru. A species with terrestrial habit and growing in clumps of several individuals, it displays showy pink to purple flowers up to 20 cm (8 in) wide. It is currently considered a critically endangered species by the IUCN, due to overcollection in the wild.

== Description ==
A terrestrial, or lithophytic orchid, Phragmipedium kovachii grows in clumps. The short stems have up to nine leaves each, which are linear-lanceolate in shape, glossy green, and up to 64 cm (25 in) long and up to 5 cm (2 in) wide. They are thick and have an acute tip; the primary vein is prominent beneath. The flower stalk is 20–52 cm (7.9–20.5 in) tall with a solitary flower that is 10–20 cm (3.9–7.9 in) wide. The sepals are broadly elliptic in shape and covered with golden-brown hairs externally, and whitish to rose-pink internally. The petals are pink to dark purple, broadly elliptic to obovate in shape, up to 6 cm (2 in) long, with recurved margins; except for the cup-shaped lip or labellum, which can be up 7.5 cm (3.0 in) long and 4 cm (1.6 in) wide, and is purple to fuchsia in colour. The fruits are capsules up to 10.5 cm (4.1 in) long and up to 0.9 cm (0.35 in) in diameter.

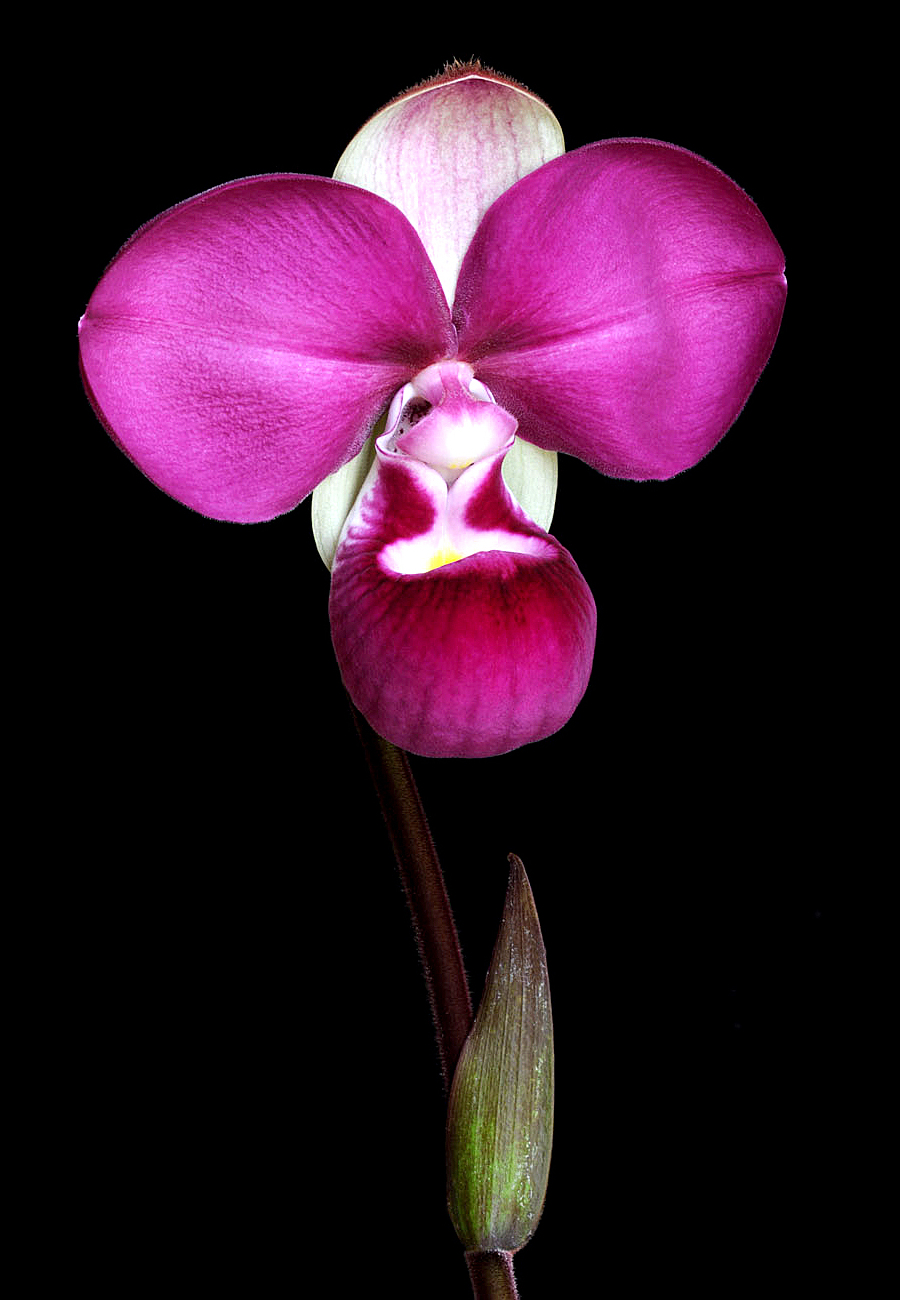
Phragmipedium kovachii bloom

== Taxonomy ==
The first published description of this species was made in June 2002 by John Atwood and Stig Dalström of Marie Selby Botanical Gardens, and Ricardo Fernandez from the San Marcos National University Herbarium (USM). An independent description prepared by orchid taxonomist Eric Christenson was published just afterwards in July 2002, using the name Phragmipedium peruvianum, which thereby became a synonym of P. kovachii.

It was initially assigned to subgenus Micropetalum; however, it was later moved to its own subgenus Schluckebieria.

=== Controversy ===
Michael Kovach, an American orchid collector who bought the live type specimen of P. kovachii from a roadside vendor in Peru, had smuggled the plant into the US and taken it to the Selby Botanical Gardens. According to a report in the journal Nature, Selby Botanical Gardens knew that Eric Christenson would publish the same species in a forthcoming issue of the journal Orchids, so they rushed to publish their description in a supplement of the Selby Gardens' journal, Selbyana.

Orchids in genus Phragmipedium are protected under the CITES treaty, so any trade or possession that doesn't comply with CITES standards is deemed illegal. An investigation led by the U.S. Fish and Wildlife Service and assisted by the U.S. Department of Agriculture, U.S. Customs Service and the then CITES authority in Peru (INRENA) among others, brought Kovach to trial. Kovach was sentenced to 2 years probation and a fine of $1000. While Selby Botanic Gardens saw its CITES permit revoked, was sentenced to a fine of $5000, and staff member Wesley Higgins received a 6-month restriction order.

A nomenclatural proposal was put forward in 2006 to declare the name Phragmipedium kovachii invalid and to add its original ad hoc publication "Selbyana vol. 23 Supplement" to the "opera utique oppressa" (ICN Appendix VI). Counterarguments were presented in several articles. The Nomenclature Committee for Vascular Plants declined to accept the proposal, stating "if all names based on specimens illegally collected or named after persons who have acted unwisely ... were to be rejected, we might have some major nomenclatural instability."

== Distribution and habitat ==
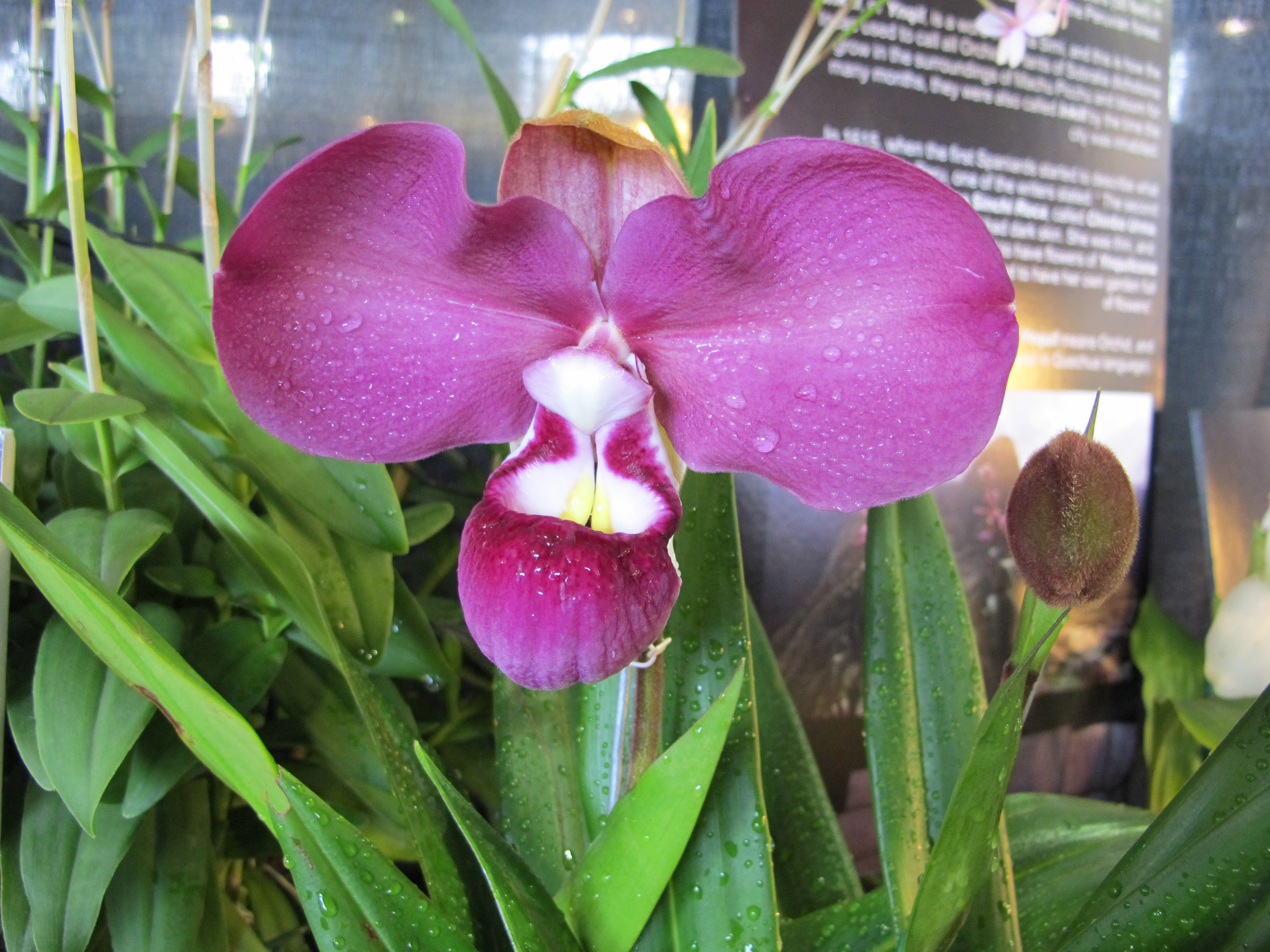
Phragmipedium kovachii at The Pacific Orchid Exposition, San Francisco, CA. 2011.

Phragmipedium kovachii is known only from a small area of five localities in the regions of Amazonas and San Martín, Peru. It grows in primary montane forest, at 1600–1950 (−2000) m of elevation, on limestone cliffs. The habitat of this species provides constant rainfall, organic matter and calcareous soil, with a pH of 6.8–7.1 (−7.9). Temperature in the area has an average of 26 °C in summer and 18 °C in winter; precipitation average is in the range of 1,000–1,500 mm (39–59 in).

== Ecology ==
Phragmipedium kovachii grows in clumps of 15 to 20 individuals on cretaceous limestone cliffs facing south, in east–west oriented valleys. It is apparently a soil specialist since, unlike other Phragmipedium species, it prefers calcareous soils with an 85.7% of calcium carbonate content.

Pollinators of this species are still unknown to science, but thought to be larger than in other Phragmipedium species, due to the bigger size of the lip. It is also hypothesized that the color pattern of the flowers mimics that of Tibouchina species, and helps attract pollinators that are sensitive to color.

== Conservation ==
Overcollecting is a major threat to the survival of P. kovachii in the wild as it was found that one locality of P. kovachii was depleted of plants, possibly even before the scientific publication in Selbyana. Following the publication, other three localities were also overcollected. It is estimated that 5000 plants or more have been extracted from the wild. Despite its inclusion in Appendix I of CITES, there's criticism on the measure, as it is believed that it is an ineffective tool against smuggling as it slows the introduction of wild species in the legal market.

The Peruvian government, in an effort to officialize the trade of P. kovachii and reduce its illegal extraction, licensed some plant nurseries for the propagation of this species.

Due to the reduction of its population by overcollection and its small area of extent, Phillip Cribb (orchid expert from Kew Gardens) and the IUCN have assigned Phragmipedium kovachii the critically endangered conservation status.

== Cultivation ==
Phragmipedium kovachii will thrive in any moist growing medium with calcium content similar to the soil of its habitat, always watching for the pH levels. Fertilizers must be applied carefully especially in young plants, as fertilizers contain salts. Light requirements are medium, avoiding intense light especially when young; mature individuals can tolerate more light. Being an orchid of high elevations, temperature must be in the range of its natural habitat.
