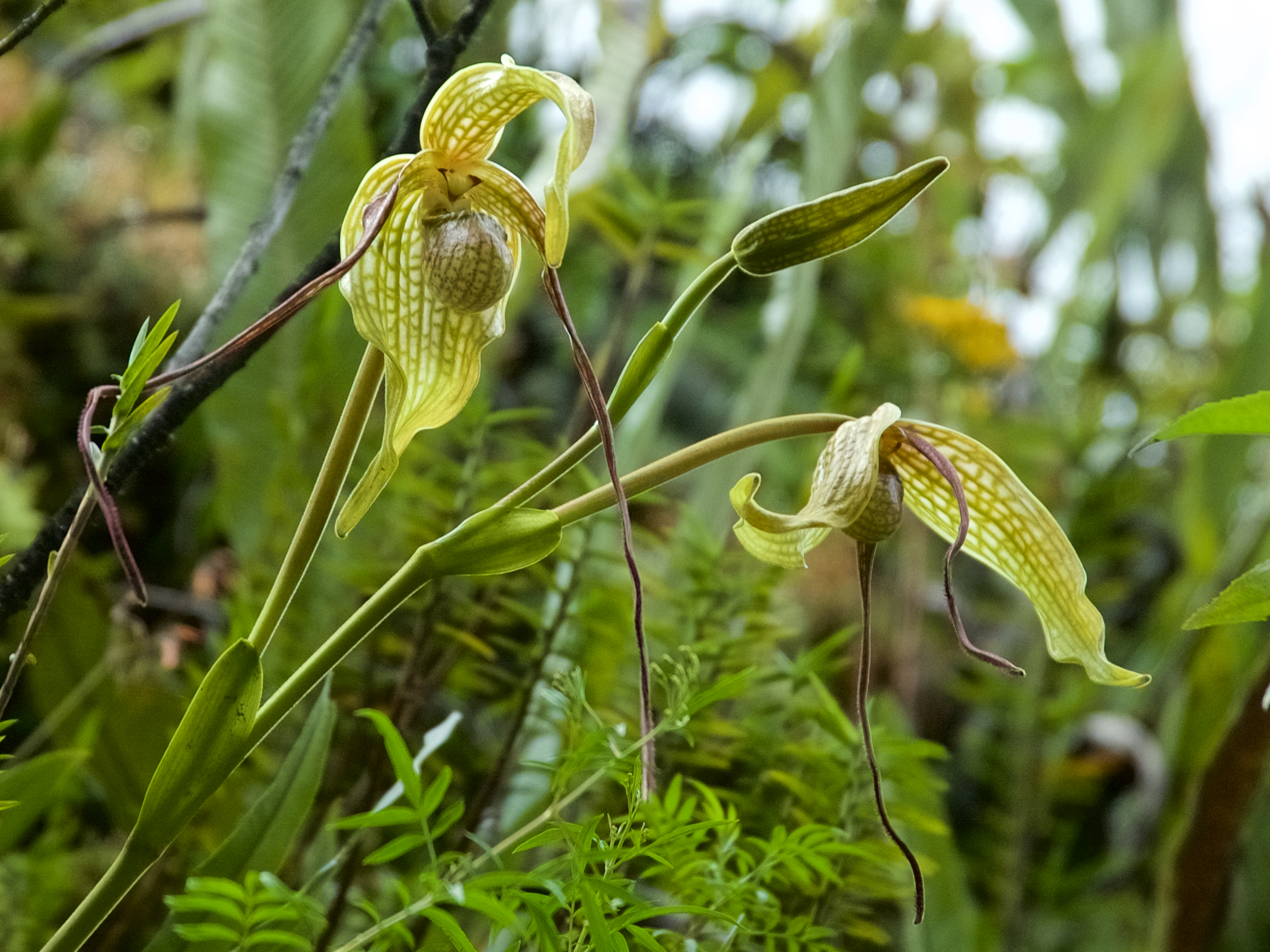
- Photographed in situ in southern Peru

Conservation status
- Endangered (IUCN 3.1)

Scientific classification
- Kingdom: Plantae
- Clade: Tracheophytes
- Clade: Angiosperms
- Clade: Monocots
- Order: Asparagales
- Family: Orchidaceae
- Subfamily: Cypripedioideae
- Genus: Phragmipedium
- Species: P. caudatum

Binomial name
- Phragmipedium caudatum (Lindl.) Rolfe

Synonyms
- Cypripedium caudatum Lindl.; Selenipedium caudatum (Lindl.) Rchb.f.; Paphiopedilum caudatum (Lindl.) Pfitzer

= Phragmipedium caudatum =

Species of plant

Phragmipedium caudatum, commonly called the Mandarin orchid, is a species of orchid occurring from Peru to Bolivia. It is the type species of the genus Phragmipedium.
