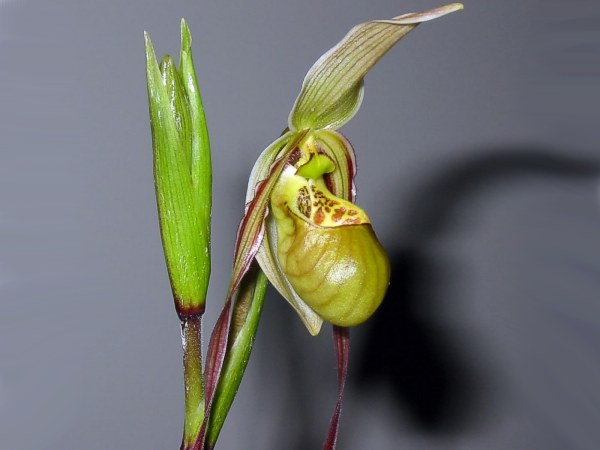
- Flower of Phragmipedium caricinum

Scientific classification
- Kingdom: Plantae
- Clade: Tracheophytes
- Clade: Angiosperms
- Clade: Monocots
- Order: Asparagales
- Family: Orchidaceae
- Subfamily: Cypripedioideae
- Genus: Phragmipedium
- Species: P. caricinum

Binomial name
- Phragmipedium caricinum (Lindl. & Paxton) Rolfe

Synonyms
- Cypripedium caricinum Lindl. & Paxton; Selenipedium caricinum (Lindl. & Paxton) Rchb.f. & Warsz.; Paphiopedilum caricinum (Lindl. & Paxton) Stein

= Phragmipedium caricinum =

Species of orchid

Phragmipedium caricinum is a species of orchid occurring from Bolivia to Brazil (Rondônia).
