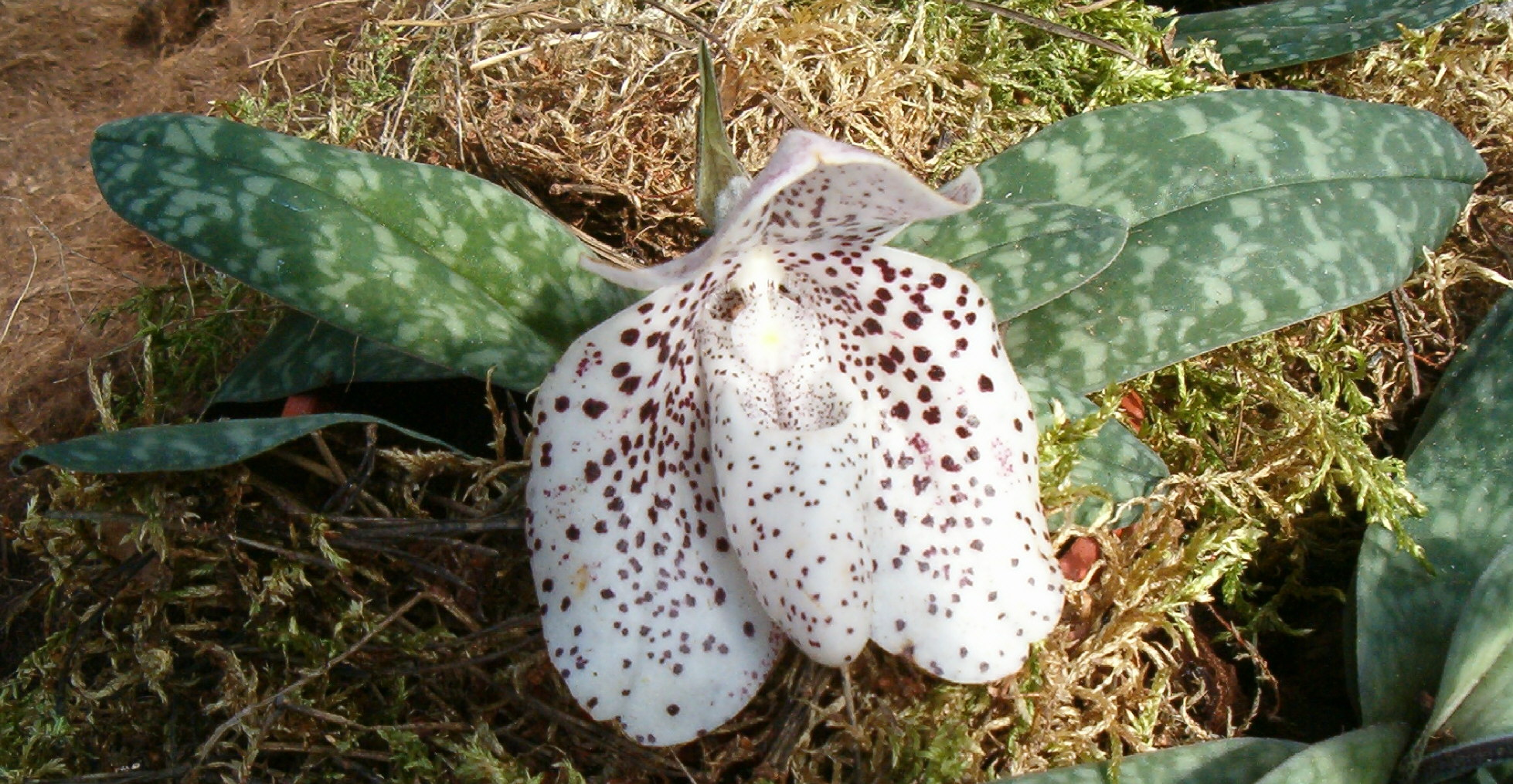

Conservation status
- Endangered (IUCN 3.1)

Scientific classification
- Kingdom: Plantae
- Clade: Embryophytes
- Clade: Tracheophytes
- Clade: Angiosperms
- Clade: Monocots
- Order: Asparagales
- Family: Orchidaceae
- Subfamily: Cypripedioideae
- Genus: Paphiopedilum
- Species: P. bellatulum

Binomial name
- Paphiopedilum bellatulum (Rchb.f.) Stein

Synonyms
- Cypripedium bellatulum Rchb.f. (basionym); Paphiopedilum bellatulum var. album O'Brien; Cordula bellatula (Rchb.f.) Rolfe; Paphiopedilum bellatulum f. album (O'Brien) Braem

= Paphiopedilum bellatulum =

Egg-in-a-nest orchid

Species of orchid

Paphiopedilum bellatulum, commonly known as the egg-in-a-nest orchid, is a species of slipper orchid found from southeastern Yunnan, Guizhou and southern Guangxi of China to Indochina, including Thailand and Myanmar. Its strikingly-colored flowers gained significant attention among enthusiasts, with various hybrid forms are cultivated.

== Taxonomy ==
P. bellatulum was originally described as Cypripedium bellatulum by Reichenbach in 1888, based on a sample gathered from the shore of Inle Lake in Burma by R. Moore, a local British commander, who then brought it to England. The epithet is derived from Latin bellus, meaning "beautiful". The species was then reclassified into Paphiopedilum by Berthold Stein in 1892, together with various other slipper orchids then under Cypripedium.

== Description ==
P. bellatulum consists of 4 to 5 leaves measuring up to 14 centimetres (5.5 in) long and 5 centimetres (2.0 in) wide, being dark green with white spots on the upper surface, while the underside is purple. Its inflorescence are short, only measuring up to 2–4.5 centimetres (0.79–1.77 in), with purple-green coloration with maroon spots and white pubescence. The inflorescence consists of a single round flower (2 in rare cases) blooming up to 5–8 centimetres (2.0–3.1 in) wide. Peak flowering occurs in May and June. A natural albino form is available as P. bellatulum fma. album, originally described in 1895.

== Distribution ==
P. bellatulum is distributed mainly in eastern Myanmar, including parts of southern China and northern Thailand, where it grows at limestone cliffs under shade in elevations of 900–1,500 metres (3,000–4,900 ft) with mean temperature range of 16–25 °C (61–77 °F).

== Conservation ==
As of 2013, P. bellatulum is designated as an endangered flora, primarily due to horticultural interest and local development, compounded by its specific ecological requirement. Several conservation efforts were done, including seed cryopreservation, and in vitro propagation.

== Gallery ==
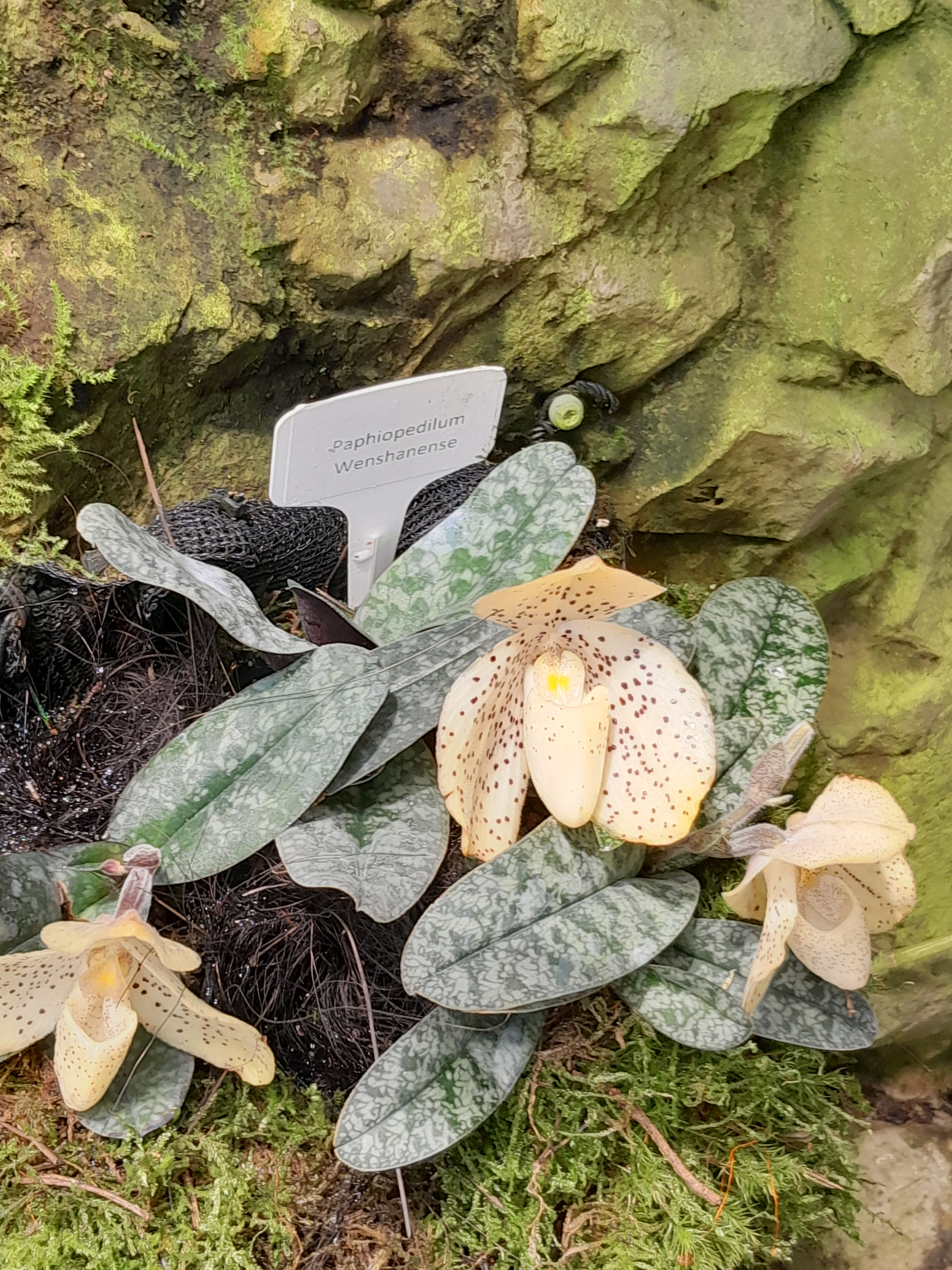
Several light orange flowers, taken in Singapore Botanic Gardens

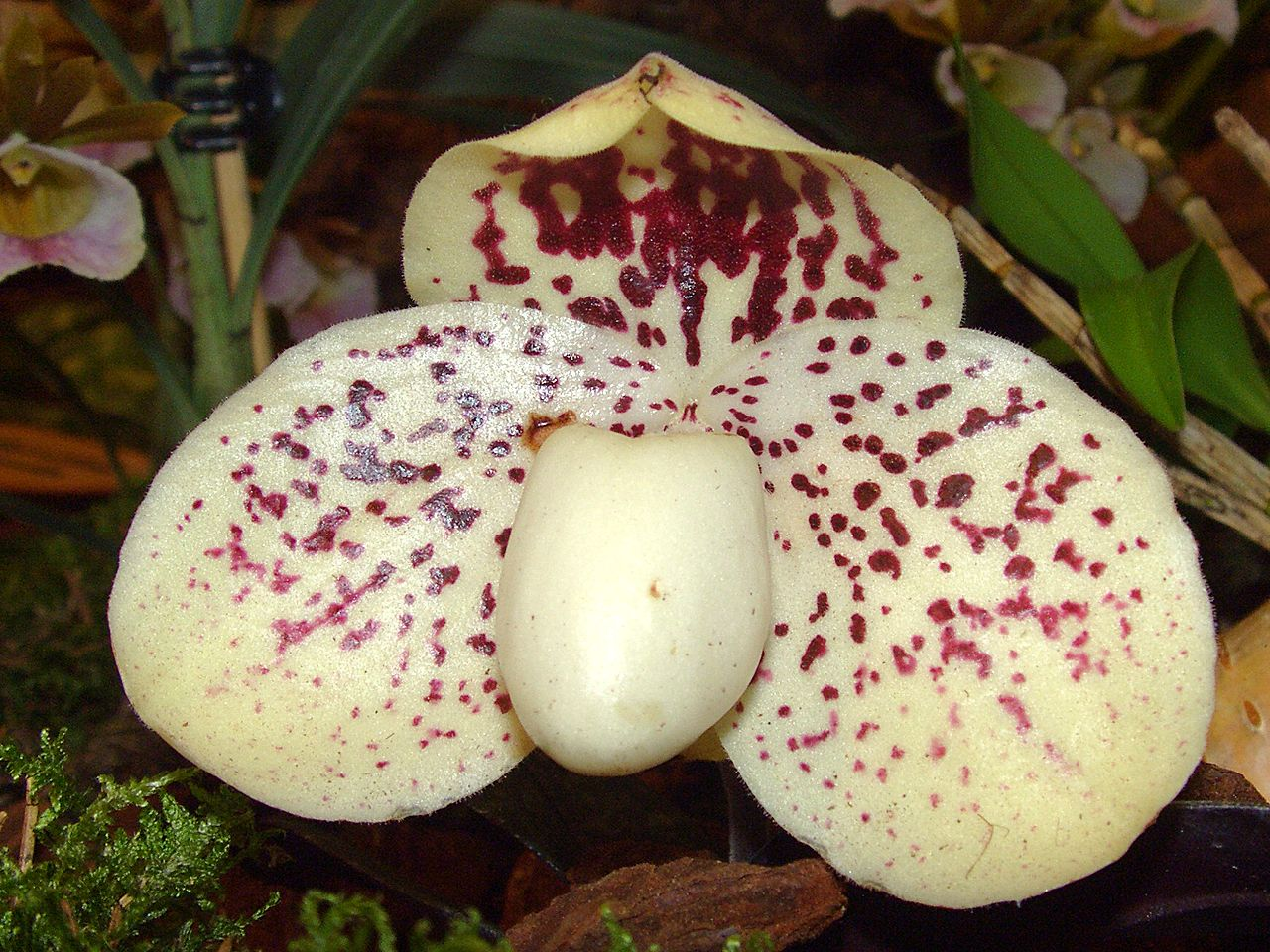
A single flower
