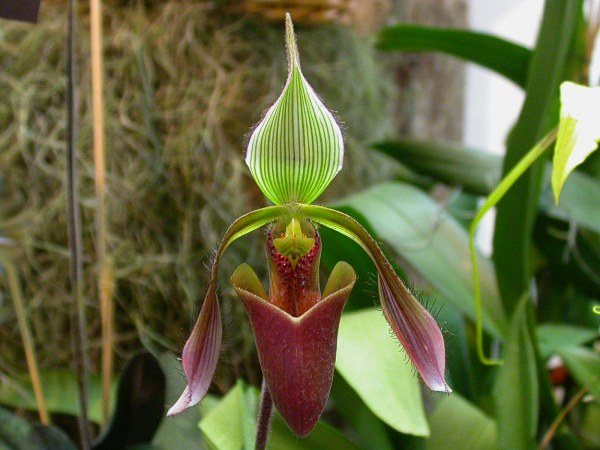
- Flower of Paphiopedilum dayanum

Scientific classification
- Kingdom: Plantae
- Clade: Tracheophytes
- Clade: Angiosperms
- Clade: Monocots
- Order: Asparagales
- Family: Orchidaceae
- Subfamily: Cypripedioideae
- Genus: Paphiopedilum
- Species: P. dayanum

Binomial name
- Paphiopedilum dayanum (Lindl.) Stein

Synonyms
- Cypripedium spectabile var. dayanum Lindl. (basionym); Cypripedium dayanum(Lindl.) Rchb.f.; Cypripedium petri Rchb.f.; Cypripedium ernestianum L.Castle; Cypripedium peteri Rchb.f.; Paphiopedilum petri (Rchb.f.) Pfitzer; Paphiopedilum dayanum var. petri (Rchb.f.) Pfitzer; Cordula dayana (Lindl.) Rolfe; Cordula petri (Rchb.f.) Rolfe

= Paphiopedilum dayanum =

Species of orchid

Paphiopedilum dayanum is a species of orchid endemic to Mount Kinabalu on Borneo.

== Taxonomy ==
It was named by John Lindley in Morph. Stud. Orchideenbl.: 11 in 1886.
