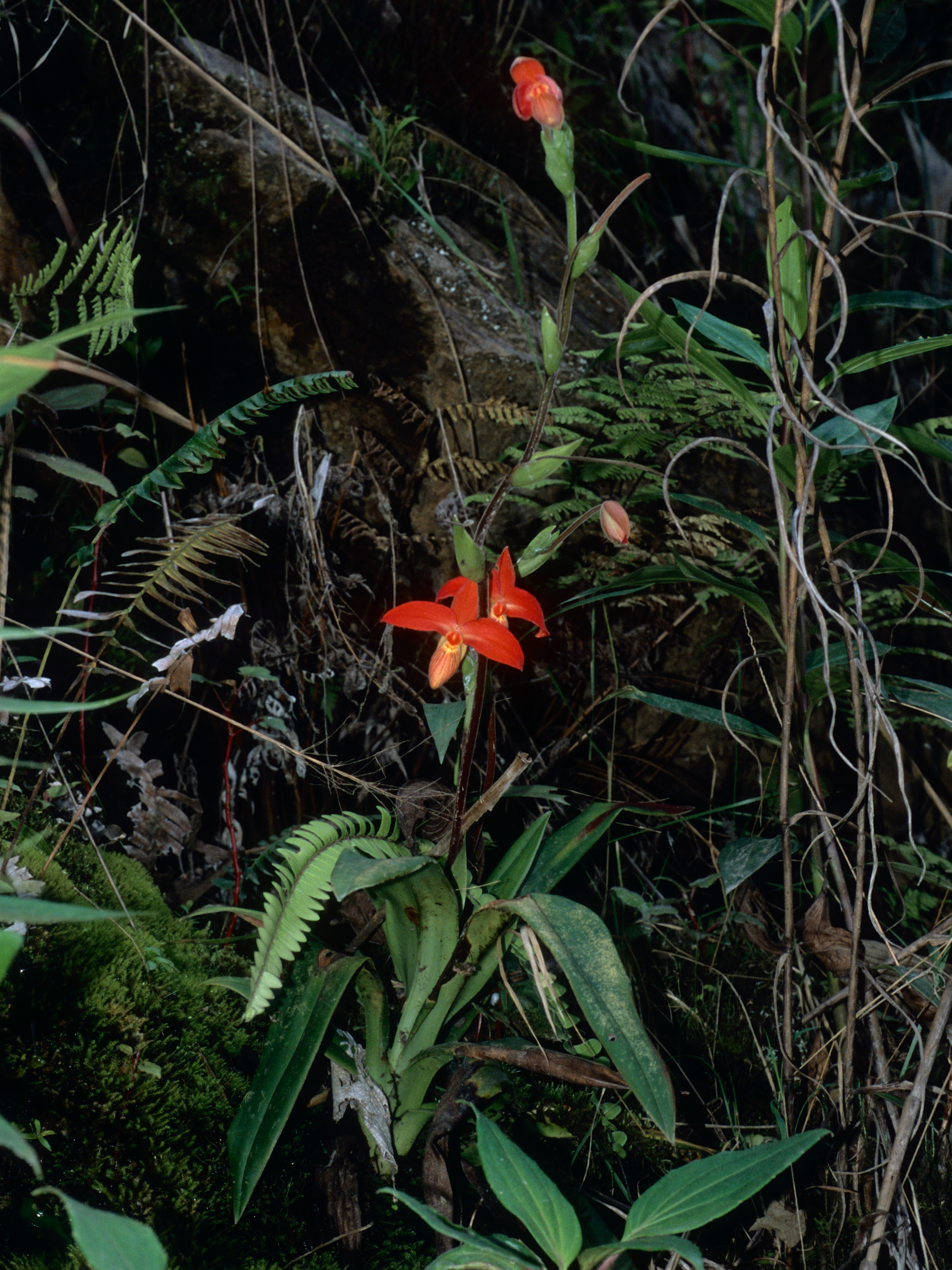
- Photographed in southern Ecuador

Conservation status
- Endangered (IUCN 3.1)

Scientific classification
- Kingdom: Plantae
- Clade: Tracheophytes
- Clade: Angiosperms
- Clade: Monocots
- Order: Asparagales
- Family: Orchidaceae
- Subfamily: Cypripedioideae
- Genus: Phragmipedium
- Species: P. besseae

Binomial name
- Phragmipedium besseae Dodson & J.Kuhn

Synonyms
- Paphiopedilum besseae V.A.Albert & Börge Pett

= Phragmipedium besseae =

Species of plant

Phragmipedium besseae is a species of orchid in the genus Phragmipedium. It is a terrestrial plant native to the wet montane forests on the eastern slope of the Andes in Colombia, Ecuador, and Peru.

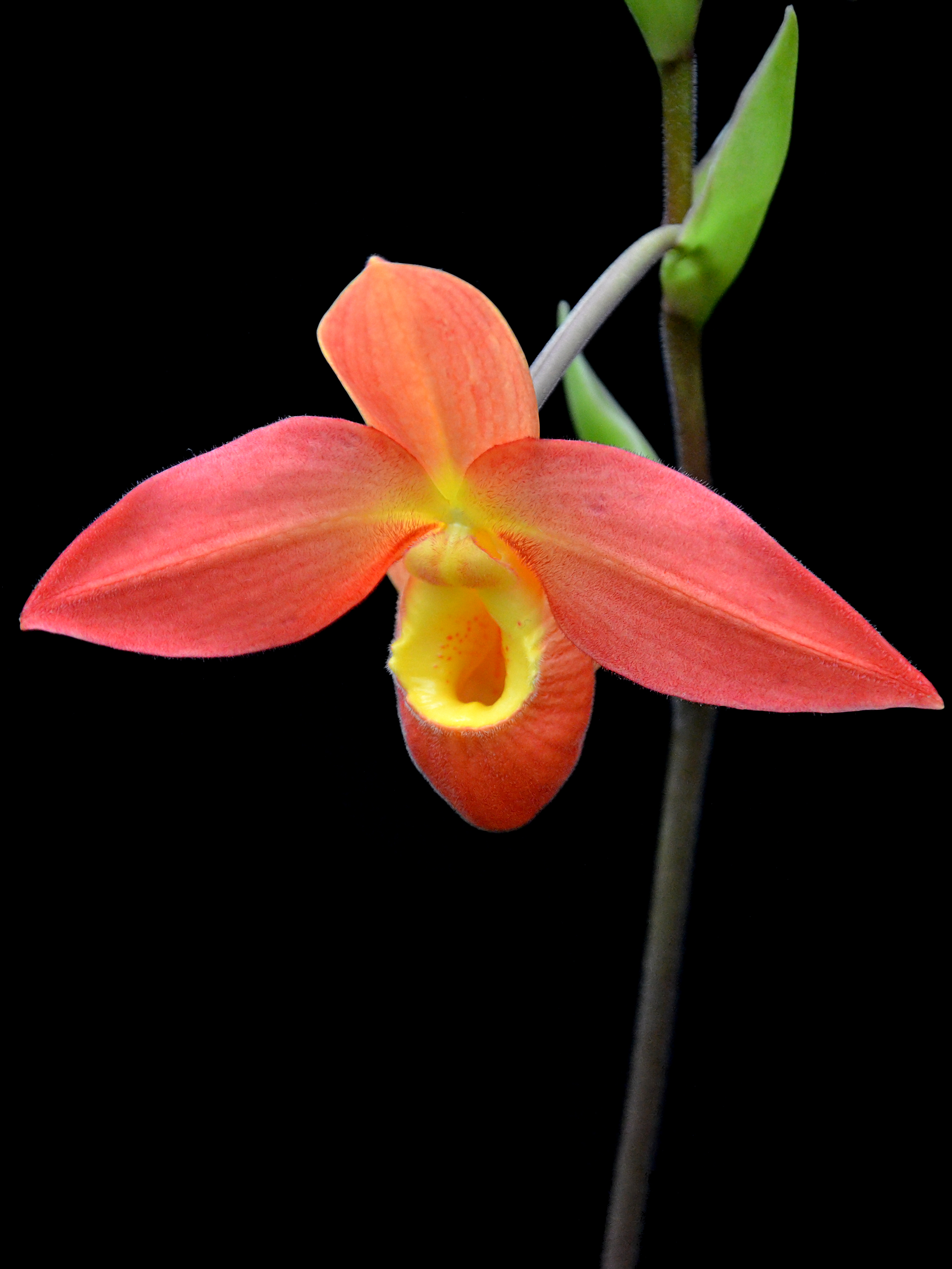
Phragmipedium besseae flower

== Description ==
It has 13–30 cm long, 2–5 cm wide, dull green, keeled leaves. The inflorescence is 1-6 flowered, opening sequentially, up to 50 cm long, brown, pilose. It has flowers 6–9 cm wide, 1 1/2 to 2 1/2" (4 to 6.5 cm), pouch with translucent windows. Phragmipedium besseae produces long rhizomes.
