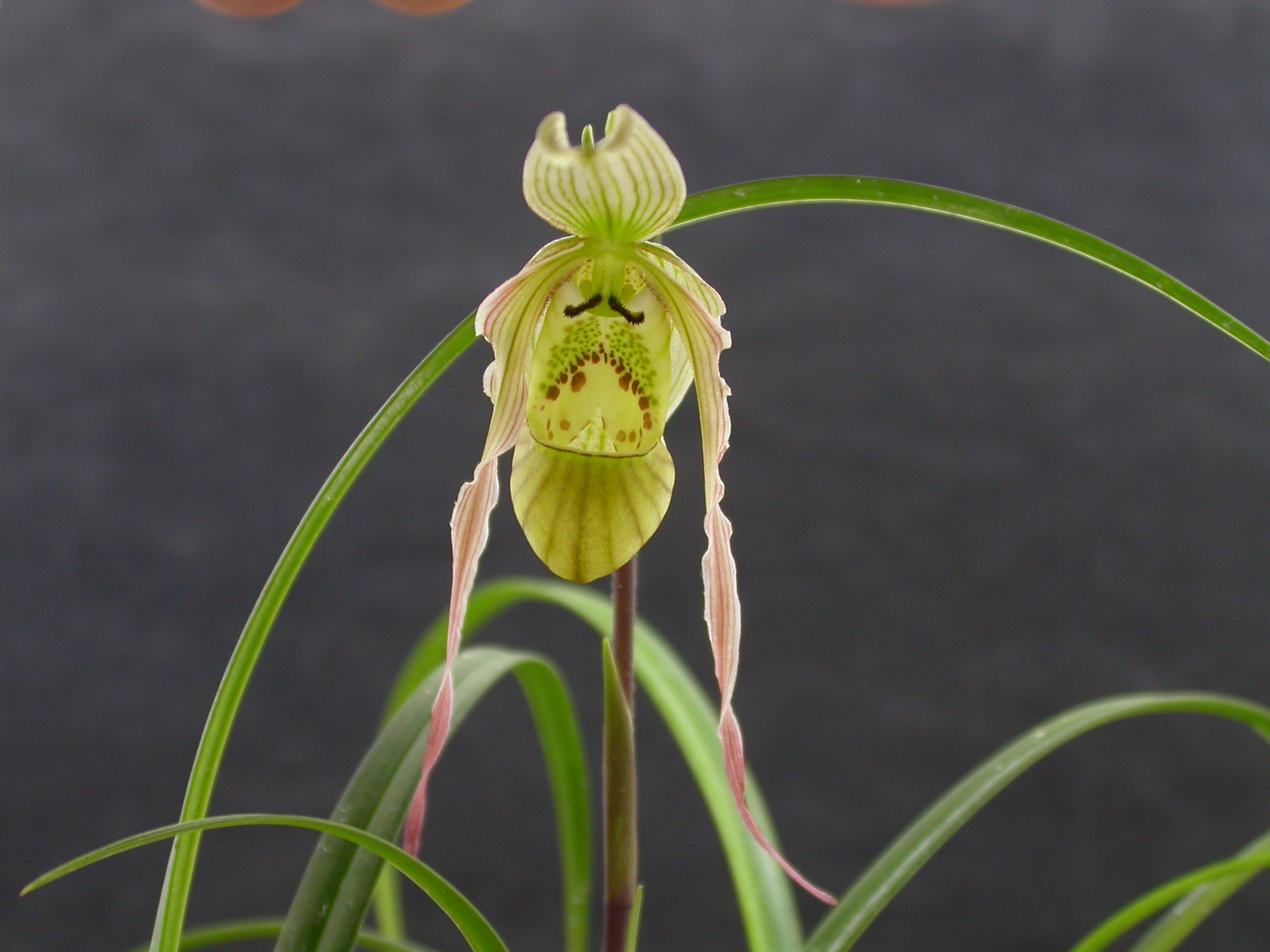
- Flower of Phragmipedium pearcei

Conservation status
- Least Concern (IUCN 3.1)

Scientific classification
- Kingdom: Plantae
- Clade: Tracheophytes
- Clade: Angiosperms
- Clade: Monocots
- Order: Asparagales
- Family: Orchidaceae
- Subfamily: Cypripedioideae
- Genus: Phragmipedium
- Species: P. pearcei

Binomial name
- Phragmipedium pearcei (Rchb.f.) Rauh & Senghas

Synonyms
- Selenipedium pearcei Rchb.f.; Cypripedium pearcei (Rchb.f.) Rchb.f.; Phragmipedium ecuadorense Garay; Paphiopedilum ecuadorense (Garay) V.A.Albert & Börge Pett.; Paphiopedilum pearcei (Rchb.f.) V.A.Albert & Börge Pett.; Phragmipedium pearcei var. ecuadorense (Garay) C.Cash ex O.Gruss

= Phragmipedium pearcei =

Species of plant

Phragmipedium pearcei is a species of orchid ranging from Ecuador to northern Peru.
