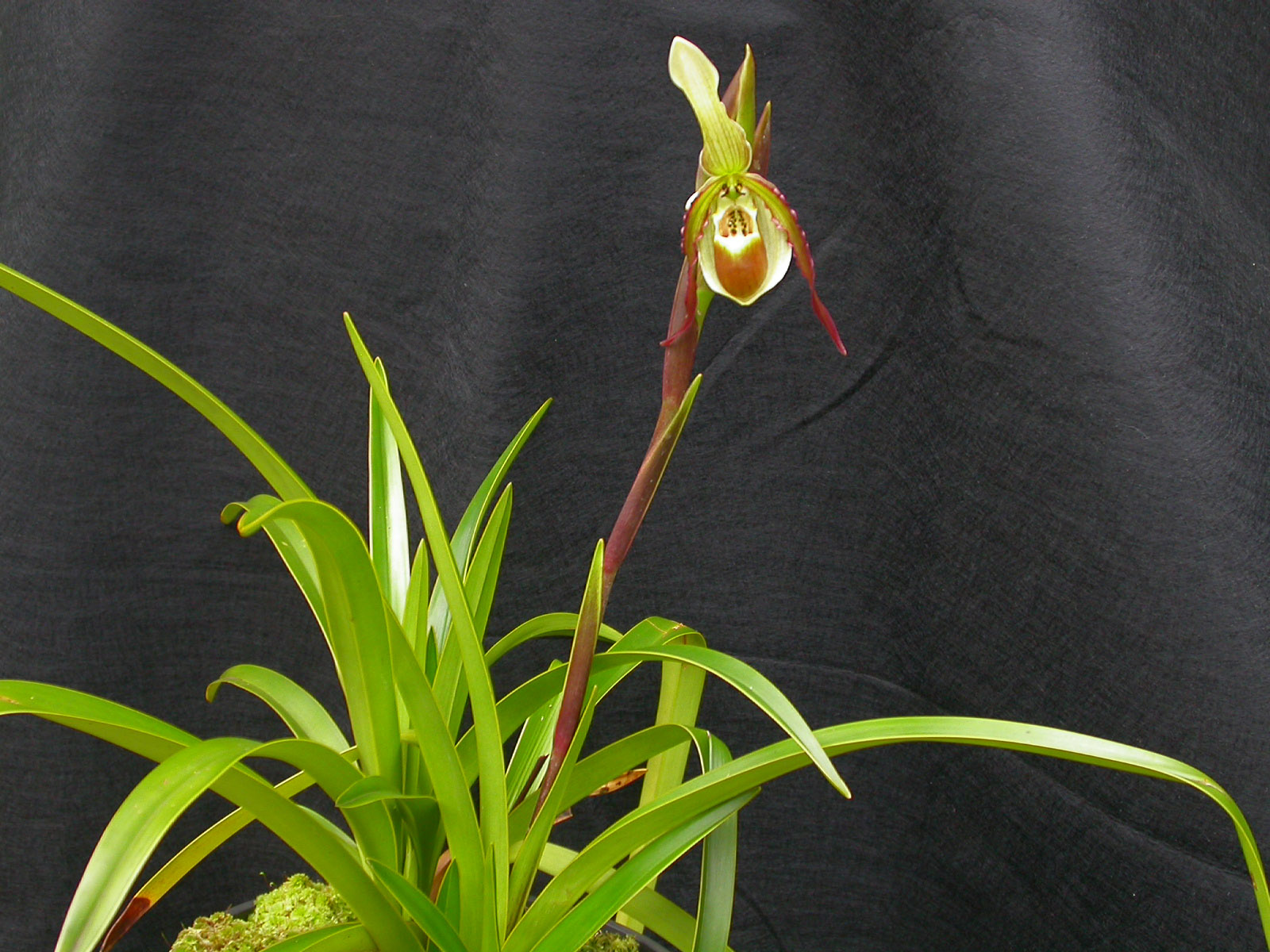
- Flower of Phragmipedium vittatum

Scientific classification
- Kingdom: Plantae
- Clade: Tracheophytes
- Clade: Angiosperms
- Clade: Monocots
- Order: Asparagales
- Family: Orchidaceae
- Subfamily: Cypripedioideae
- Genus: Phragmipedium
- Species: P. vittatum

Binomial name
- Phragmipedium vittatum (Vell.) Rolfe

Synonyms
- Cypripedium vittatum Vell.; Selenipedium vittatum (Vell.) Rchb.f.; Cypripedium paulistanum Barb.Rodr.; Cypripedium vittatum var. breve Rchb.f.; Cypripedium binotii auct.; Paphiopedilum vittatum (Vell.) Stein; Selenipedium paulistanum (Barb.Rodr.) Rolfe; Selenipedium vittatum var. breve Cogn.; Paphiopedilum paulistanum (Barb.Rodr.) Pfitzer

= Phragmipedium vittatum =

Species of orchid

Phragmipedium vittatum is a species of orchid endemic to west-central and southeastern Brazil.
