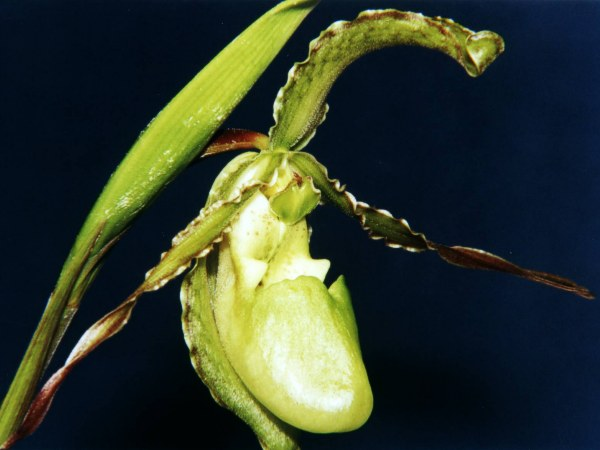
- Flower of Phragmipedium boissierianum

Scientific classification
- Kingdom: Plantae
- Clade: Tracheophytes
- Clade: Angiosperms
- Clade: Monocots
- Order: Asparagales
- Family: Orchidaceae
- Subfamily: Cypripedioideae
- Genus: Phragmipedium
- Species: P. boissierianum

Binomial name
- Phragmipedium boissierianum (Rchb.f.) Rolfe

Synonyms
- Selenipedium boissierianum Rchb.f.; Cypripedium boissierianum (Rchb.f.) Rchb.f.; Paphiopedilum boissierianum (Rchb.f.) Stein

= Phragmipedium boissierianum =

Species of plant

Phragmipedium boissierianum is a species of orchid occurring from southern Ecuador to Peru.
