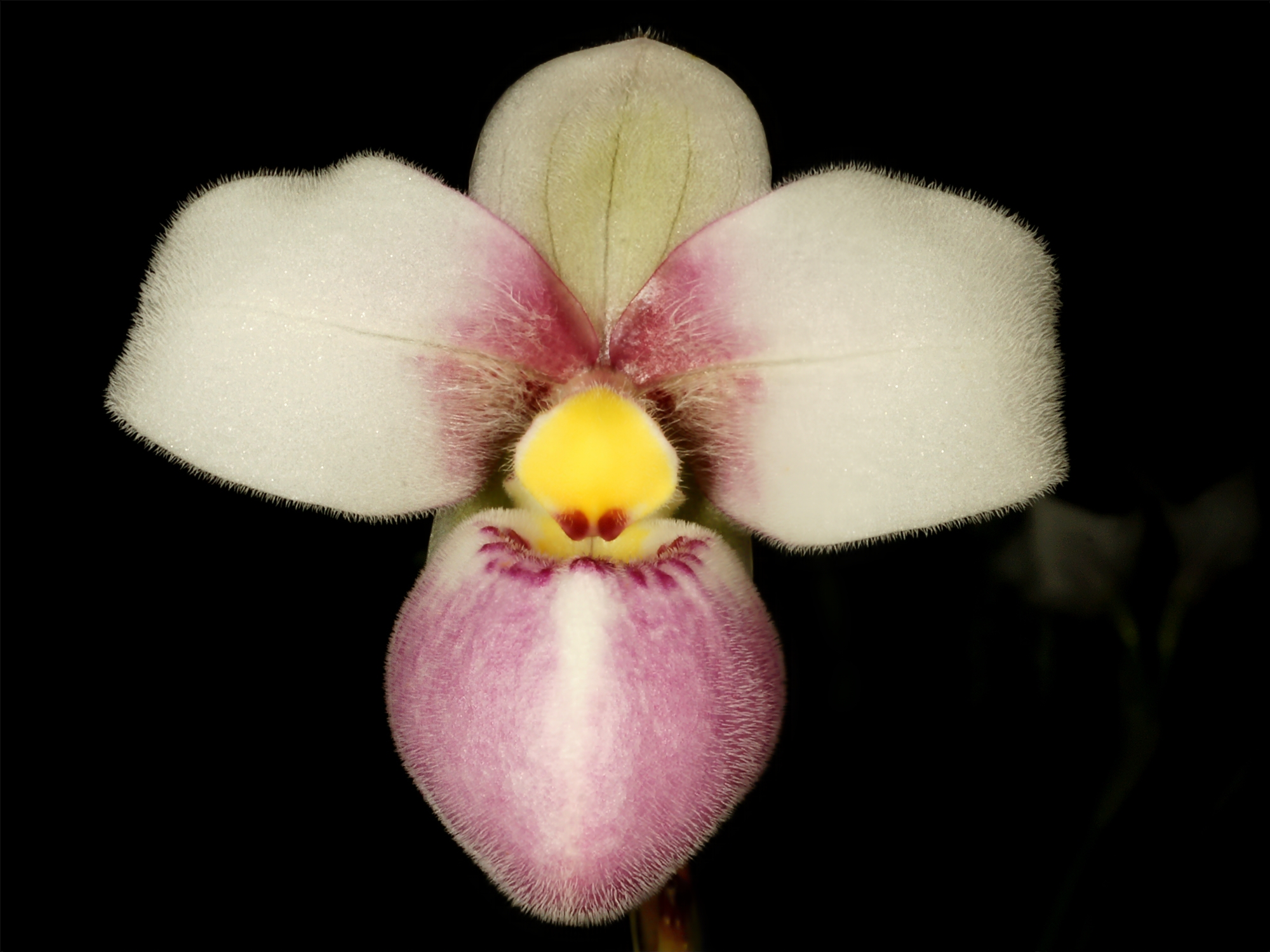
- Flower of Phragmipedium schlimii

Conservation status
- Endangered (IUCN 3.1)

Scientific classification
- Kingdom: Plantae
- Clade: Tracheophytes
- Clade: Angiosperms
- Clade: Monocots
- Order: Asparagales
- Family: Orchidaceae
- Subfamily: Cypripedioideae
- Genus: Phragmipedium
- Species: P. schlimii

Binomial name
- Phragmipedium schlimii (Linden ex Rchb.f.) Rolfe

Synonyms
- Selenipedium schlimii Linden ex Rchb.f.; Cypripedium schlimii Linden ex Rchb.f.; Paphiopedilum schlimii (Linden ex Rchb.f.) Stein; Cypripedium schlimii var. albiflorum Linden; Phragmipedium schlimii var. albiflorum (Linden) Braem; Phragmipedium schlimii f. albiflorum (Linden) O.Gruss

= Phragmipedium schlimii =

Species of orchid

Phragmipedium schlimii is a species of orchid endemic to Colombia.
