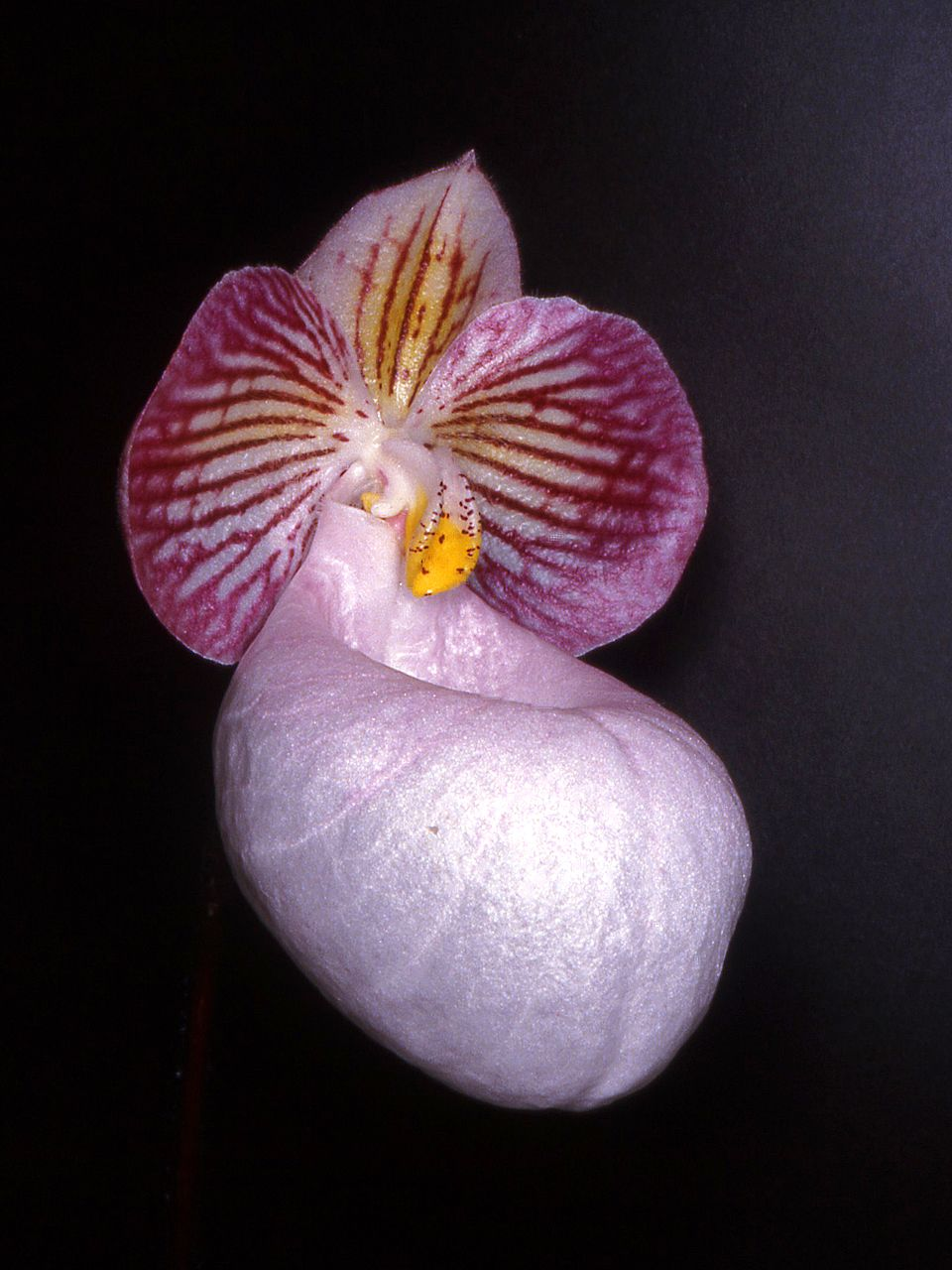

Conservation status
- Critically Endangered (IUCN 3.1)
- CITES Appendix I

Scientific classification
- Kingdom: Plantae
- Clade: Tracheophytes
- Clade: Angiosperms
- Clade: Monocots
- Order: Asparagales
- Family: Orchidaceae
- Subfamily: Cypripedioideae
- Genus: Paphiopedilum
- Species: P. micranthum

Binomial name
- Paphiopedilum micranthum Tang & F.T.Wang

Synonyms
- Paphiopedilum micranthum ssp. eburneum Fowlie; Paphiopedilum micranthum var. alboflavum Braem; Paphiopedilum micranthum var. glanzeanum O.Gruss & Roeth; Paphiopedilum micranthum f. alboflavum (Braem) Braem; Paphiopedilum micranthum f. glanzeanum (O.Gruss & Roeth) O.Gruss & Roeth; Paphiopedilum micranthum var. oblatum Z.J.Liu & J.Yong Zhang; Paphiopedilum globulosum Z.J.Liu & S.C.Chen

= Paphiopedilum micranthum =

Silver slipper orchid

Species of orchid

Paphiopedilum micranthum, described in 1951, is commonly known as the silver slipper orchid or hard-leaved pocket orchid. It blooms during late winter to early summer with one flower per inflorescence. As opposed to its close sibling Paph. malipoense, the flowers of Paph. micranthum have no fragrance.

== Distribution ==
Paphiopedilum micranthum is found from northern Vietnam to western and northern Guangxi, southeastern Yunnan and western Guizhou (China), at elevations of 460 to 1600 meters. The plant is found on cliffs and in crevices which contain leaf litter, limestone, and clay. The area is subjected to fog in the winter and heavy rain from late spring to summer.

== Culture ==
Keep plant in moderately shaded area with intermediate temperatures around 30 °F to 88 °F and humidity of 60 to 80%. The plant is not easy to bloom and requires a well-drained mix such as a mixture of gravel, perlite and bark. Keep plant cool during the winter. The plant needs a high pH sins it grows in a lime rock area in nature.

== Varieties ==
- Paphiopedilum micranthum var. alboflavum
- Paphiopedilum micranthum var. eburneum: yellow sepals, yellow petals with red veins, white lip
- Paphiopedilum micranthum var. glanzeanum: white petals and sepals with shades of yellow, white lip.
- Paphiopedilum micranthum var. guanxii: pink sepals, pink petals with red veins, white lip
