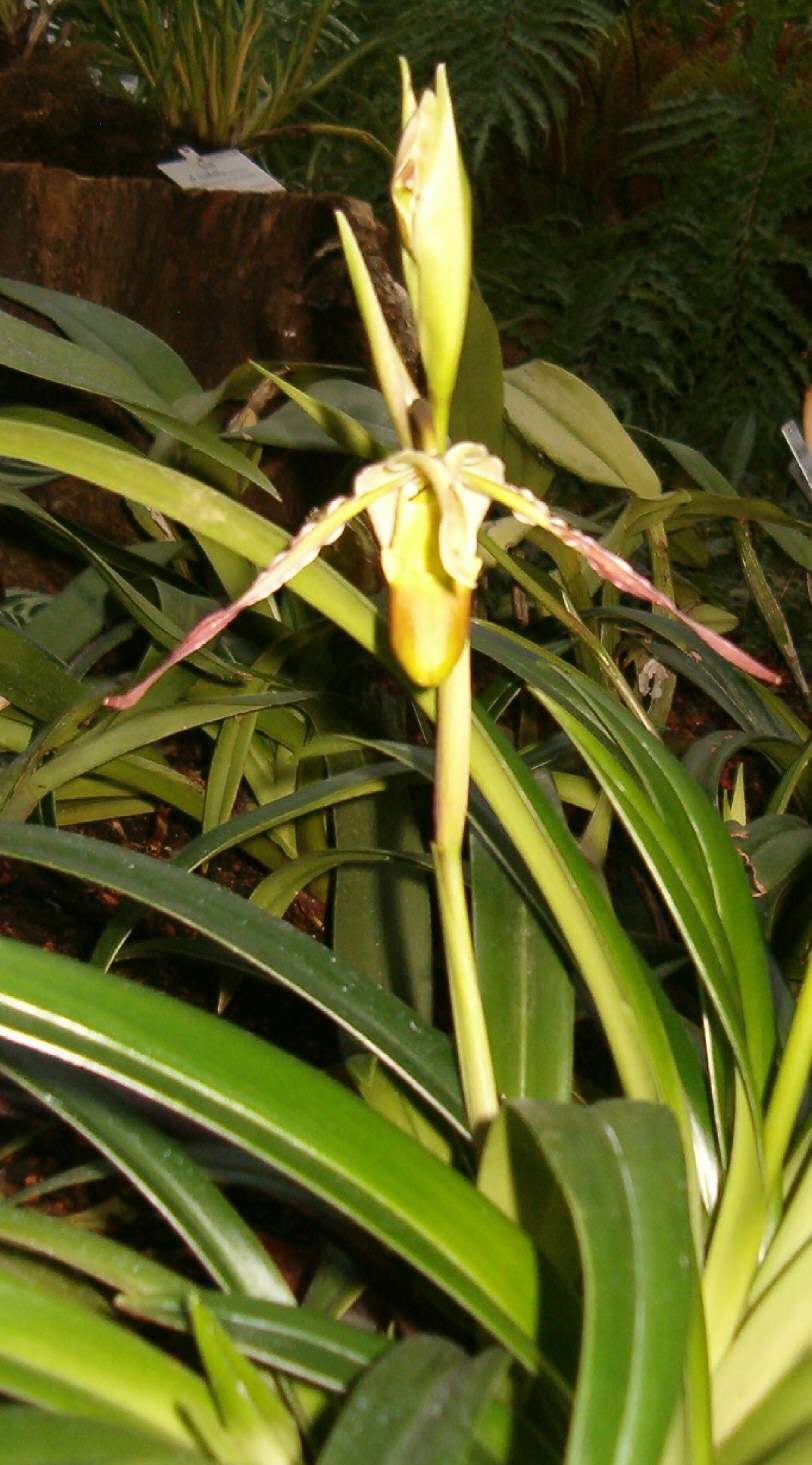
- Flower of Phragmipedium longifolium

Scientific classification
- Kingdom: Plantae
- Clade: Tracheophytes
- Clade: Angiosperms
- Clade: Monocots
- Order: Asparagales
- Family: Orchidaceae
- Subfamily: Cypripedioideae
- Genus: Phragmipedium
- Species: P. longifolium

Binomial name
- Phragmipedium longifolium (Warsz. & Rchb.f.) Rolfe

Synonyms
- Cypripedium longifolium Warsz. & Rchb.f.; Selenipedium longifolium (Warsz. & Rchb.f.) Rchb.f.; Cypripedium hartwegii Rchb.f.; Selenipedium hartwegii (Rchb.f.) Rchb.f.; Cypripedium reichenbachii W.Bull; Selenipedium dariense Rchb.f.; Selenipedium reichenbachii Endres ex Rchb.f.; Selenipedium roezlii Rchb.f.; Cypripedium roezlii Regel; Cypripedium dariense Rchb.f.; Cypripedium hincksianum Rchb.f.; Selenipedium hincksianum Rchb.f.; Cypripedium reichenbachianum auct.; Paphiopedilum longifolium (Warsz. & Rchb.f.) Pfitzer; Cypripedium gracile H.J.Veitch; Selenipedium gracile (H.J.Veitch) Desbois; Cypripedium longifolium var. gracile (H.J.Veitch) Rolfe; Phragmipedium longifolium var. hincksianum (Rchb.f.) Stein; Paphiopedilum roezlii (Rchb.f.) Pfitzer; Paphiopedilum hartwegii (Rchb.f.) Pfitzer; Paphiopedilum hincksianum (Rchb.f.) Pfitzer; Phragmipedium longifolium var. darienense (Rchb.f.) Hallier f.; Phragmipedium longifolium var. roezlii (Rchb.f.) Hallier f.; Phragmipedium hartwegii (Rchb.f.) Pfitzer; Phragmipedium longifolium var. gracile (H.J.Veitch) Pfitzer; Phragmipedium dariense (Rchb.f.) Garay; Phragmipedium hincksianum (Rchb.f.) Garay; Phragmipedium roezlii (Rchb.f.) Garay; Phragmipedium hartwegii var. baderi Roeth & O.Gruss; Phragmipedium christiansenianum O. Gruss & Roeth; Phragmipedium hartwegii f. baderi (Roeth & O.Gruss) O.Gruss; Phragmipedium longifolium f. gracile (H.J.Veitch) O.Gruss; Phragmipedium longifolium f. minutum O.Gruss

= Phragmipedium longifolium =

Species of orchid

Phragmipedium longifolium is a species of orchid ranging from Costa Rica to Ecuador. Phragmipedium longifolium is a herb found natively in the coastal and Andean regions of Ecuador, among other surrounding countries.
