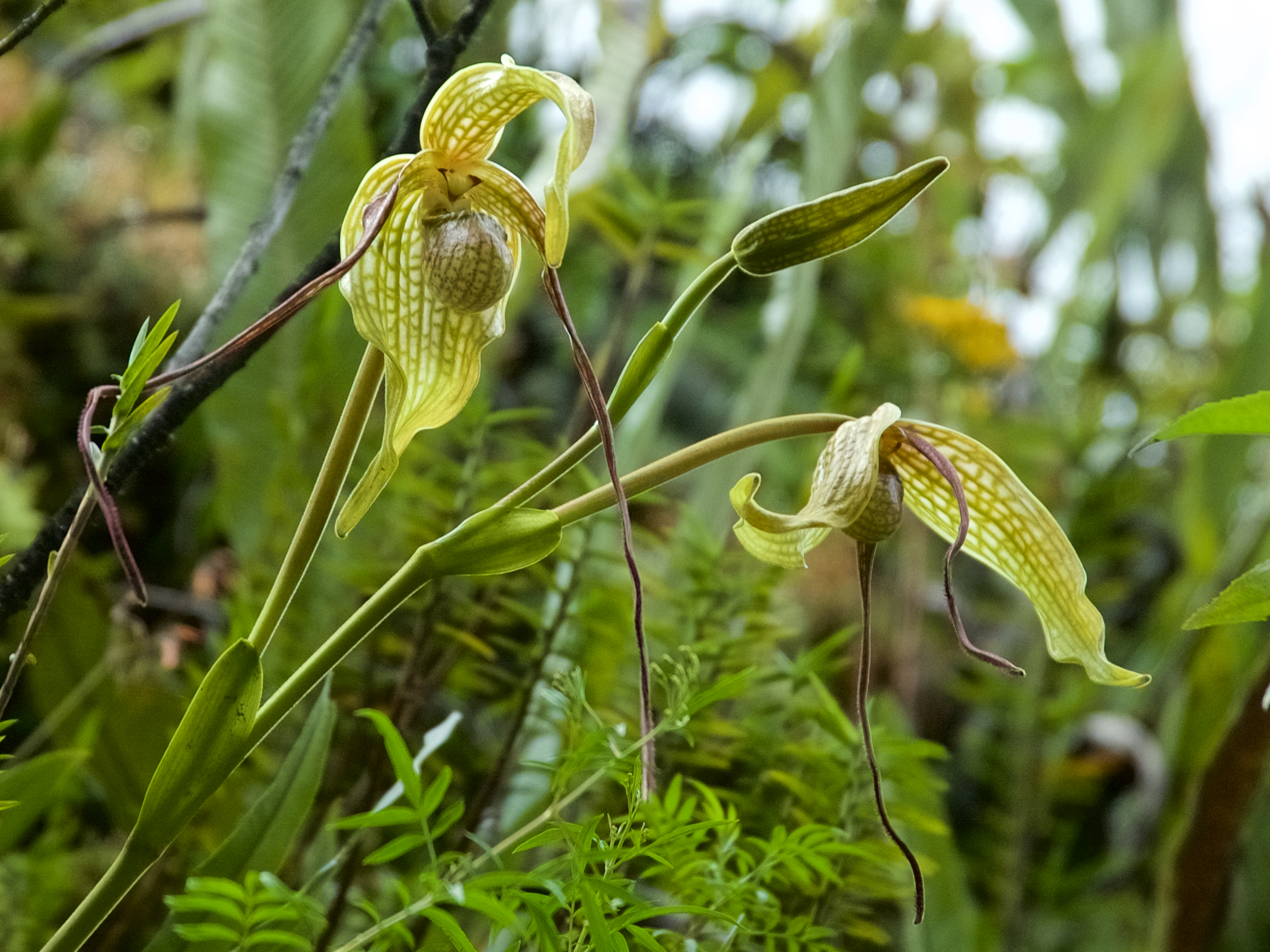
- Phragmipedium caudatum in situ in southern Peru

Conservation status
- CITES Appendix I

Scientific classification
- Kingdom: Plantae
- Clade: Tracheophytes
- Clade: Angiosperms
- Clade: Monocots
- Order: Asparagales
- Family: Orchidaceae
- Subfamily: Cypripedioideae
- Genus: Phragmipedium; Rolfe

Type species
- Phragmipedium caudatum

Synonyms
- Uropedium Lindl.; Phragmipedilum Rolfe

= Phragmipedium =

Genus of orchids

Phragmipedium is a genus of the Orchid family (Orchidaceae) (Subfamily Cypripedioideae) and the only genus comprised in the tribe Phragmipedieae and subtribe Phragmipediinae. The name of the genus is derived from the Greek phragma, which means "division", and pedium, which means "slipper" (referring to the pouch). It is abbreviated 'Phrag' in trade journals.

About 20 species of these lady's slipper orchids are known from SW Mexico, Central and tropical South America.

All Phragmipedium species are listed under Appendix I of the Convention on International Trade in Endangered Species (CITES), meaning that commercial international trade in wild-sourced specimens is prohibited, while non-commercial trade is regulated.

== Taxonomy ==
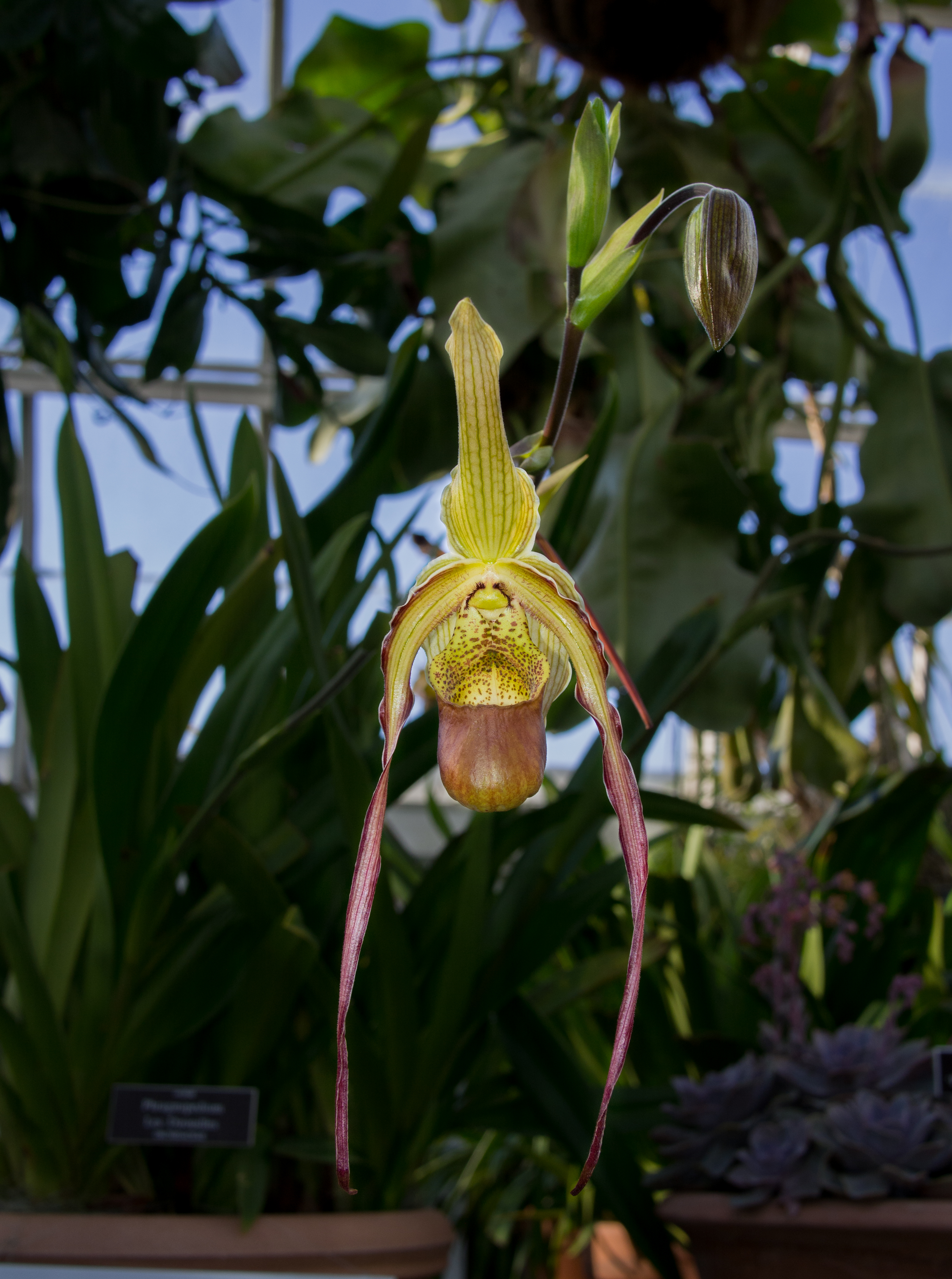
Phragmipedium "les dirouilles" cultivar

The genus Phragmipedium is divided into several sections:

- Phragmipedium: P. caudatum, P. exstaminodium, P. lindenii
- Himantopetalum: P. caricinum, P. christiansenianum, P. pearcei, P. klotzscheanum, P. richteri, P. tetzlaffianum
- Platypetalum: P. lindleyanum
- Lorifolia: P. boissierianum, P. hirtzii, P. longifolium, P. vittatum
- Micropetalum: P. besseae, P. besseae var. dalessandroi, P. fischeri, P. schlimii
- Schluckebieria: P. kovachii

The exact number of species is still being discussed among specialists: O. Gruss recognizes 20 species, compared to the 15 species accepted by Lucile M. McCook (see References).

Most Phragmipedium species are either terrestrial, epiphytic or lithophytic in habit. They show a unique shieldlike staminode, long, moustache-like petals and a 3-locular ovary. The large pouchlike lip is curved inwards at the margins. The acute leaves attain a length of about 80 cm. The stem lacks pseudobulbs and grows about 80 cm (31 in) high, showing 2 to 3 flowers.

Phragmipedium besseae was first found in Peru by Elizabeth Locke Besse in 1981. Soon afterwards, the site was plundered and destroyed by orchid hunters. Seed was preserved to avert extinction. This orchid is unusual because its flowers have a bright orange-red to almost strong salmon-red color (there is also a yellow variety), unseen in any lady's slipper orchid. The oval-shaped petals are wide. The narrow leaves are elliptic in shape. It has since been used extensively in hybridization.

Phragmipedium caudatum is considered a complex, i.e. it could contain several species or subspecies, based on differences in flower size and color. This orchid with a short stem is semi-terrestrial, semi-lithophytic to epiphytic, depending on the substrate . The cream-colored flowers are laced with greenish stripes. The lateral spiraling, drooping petals are red-tinted and very long, even reaching the soil. They grow on wet, moss-covered hillsides.

Phragmipedium lindleyanum, named after John Lindley, forms a rosette of five long linear leaves with a yellow margin, reaching a length of 50 cm (20 in). The erect raceme can grow as high as 1 m. It is many-flowered and sometimes branched at the basis. The flowers open in succession, giving the orchid a long blooming period. The hoary flowers are green with brown veins. The glabrous, pouchlike lip is yellow, with red veins.

Phragmipedium longifolium, described in 1852 by H.G. Reichenbach f. and J. v. Warscewicz, has long lanceolate leaves without yellow margin, growing to a length of 60 cm (24 in). The inflorescence reaches a length of 1 m (3 ft 3 in), with about 10 flowers, opening in succession. The long lateral petals are purplish green. The rather small glabrous labellum has a green color.

Allied genera include Paphiopedilum, Selenipedium, Cypripedium and the monotypic Mexipedium.

There are many interspecific hybrids. Rare crossings have been made between Phragmipedium and Paphiopedilum.

The genus Uropedium Lindl. is generally included in Phragmipedium.

=== Species ===
The following species ordered by sections are recognized by Plants of the World Online As of May 2024:

Section	Image	Name	Distribution
Himantopetalum		Phragmipedium caricinum (Lindl. & Paxton) Rolfe	Bolivia.
Himantopetalum		Phragmipedium pearcei (Veitch ex J.Dix) Rauh & Senghas	Ecuador to N. Peru.
Himantopetalum		Phragmipedium klotzschianum (Rchb.f.) Rolfe	SE. Venezuela to Guyana and N. Brazil.
Lorifolia		Phragmipedium boissierianum (Rchb.f. & Warsz.) Rolfe	S. Ecuador to Peru.
Lorifolia		Phragmipedium cabrejosii Damian, M.Díaz & Pupulin	Peru
Lorifolia		Phragmipedium hirtzii Dodson	N. Ecuador.
Lorifolia		Phragmipedium longifolium (Warsz. & Rchb.f.) Rolfe	Costa Rica to Ecuador.
Lorifolia		Phragmipedium vittatum (Vell.) Rolfe	WC. & SE. Brazil.
Micropetalum		Phragmipedium besseae Dodson & J.Kuhn	Ecuador to N. Peru.
Micropetalum		Phragmipedium ramiroi Kolan. & Szlach.	Colombia
Micropetalum		Phragmipedium schlimii (Linden ex Rchb.f.) Rolfe	Colombia
Platypetalum		Phragmipedium lindleyanum (R.H.Schomb. ex Lindl.) Rolfe	N. South America to Pernambuco, Brazil.
Phragmipedium		Phragmipedium caudatum (Lindl.) Rolfe	Bolivia to Peru.
Phragmipedium		Phragmipedium guianense Sambin & Braem	French Guyana
Phragmipedium		Phragmipedium humboldtii (Warsz.) J.T.Atwood & Dressler	Mexico, Guatemala, Honduras, Nicaragua, Costa Rica and Panama
Phragmipedium		Phragmipedium lindenii (Lindl.) Dressler & N.H.Williams	Venezuela to Ecuador.
Phragmipedium		Phragmipedium warszewiczianum (Rchb.f.) Schltr.	S Mexico to Panama.
Schluckebieria		Phragmipedium kovachii J.T.Atwood, Dalström & Ric.Fernández	San Martin, Peru

=== Natural hybrids ===
The following natural hybrids are recognized:

Image	Name	Parentage	Distribution
	Phragmipedium × pfitzerianum O.Gruss	P. longifolium × P. warszewiczianum.	Ecuador
	Phragmipedium × richteri Roeth & O.Gruss	P. boissierianum × P. pearcei	Ecuador to N. Peru
	Phragmipedium × talamancanum Pupulin & M.Díaz	P. humboldtii × P. longifolium	Costa Rica to Panama
