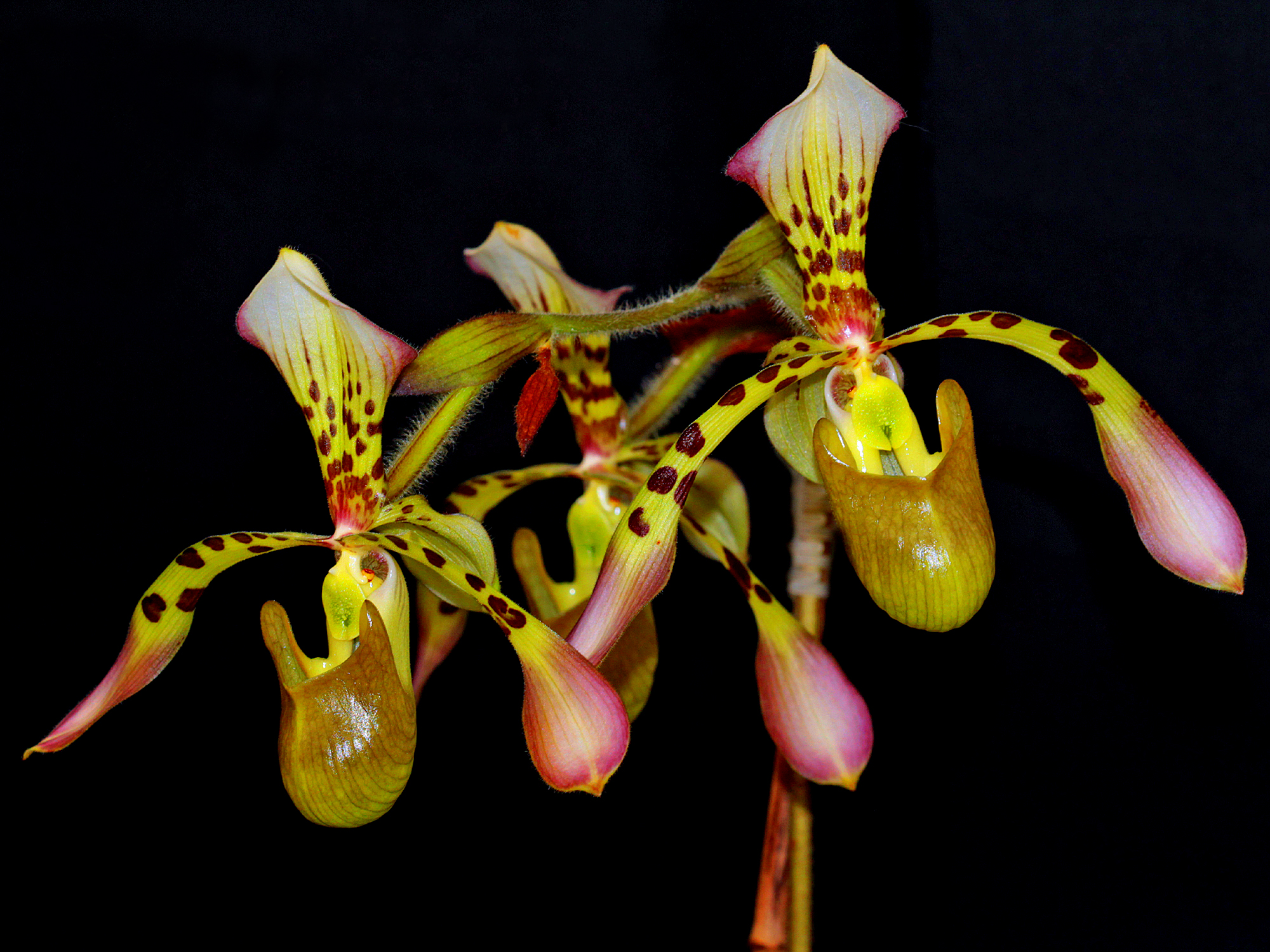
- Paphiopedilum lowii

Scientific classification
- Kingdom: Plantae
- Clade: Tracheophytes
- Clade: Angiosperms
- Clade: Monocots
- Order: Asparagales
- Family: Orchidaceae
- Subfamily: Cypripedioideae
- Genus: Paphiopedilum
- Subgenus: Paphiopedilum subg. Polyantha (Pfitzer) Brieger (1971)

Type species
- Paphiopedilum lowii

Species
- See text

= Paphiopedilum subg. Polyantha =

Subgenus of flowering plants

Paphiopedilum subgenus Polyantha is a subgenus of the genus Paphiopedilum. Species in this section have more than one flower per inflorescence.

== Distribution ==
Plants from this section are found from western China down to Philippines, Malaysia, Indonesia, and Papua New Guinea.

== Species ==
Paphiopedilum subgenus Polyantha comprises the following species:

Image	Name	Distribution	Elevation (m)
	Paphiopedilum adductum Asher 1983	Philippines (Bokidnon and Mindanao)	1,200–1,300 metres (3,900–4,300 ft)
	Paphiopedilum dianthum Tang & Wang 1940	China(Yunnan, Guangxi), North Vietnam	460–1,060 metres (1,510–3,480 ft)
	Paphiopedilum gigantifolium Braem, Baker & Baker 1997	southern Sulawesi	0–980 metres (0–3,215 ft)
	Paphiopedilum glanduliferum (Blume) Pfitzer 1895	Irian Jaya Coast, Northwestern New Guinea, and Indonesia	0–1,700 metres (0–5,577 ft)
	Paphiopedilum haynaldianum (Rchb. f.) Pfitzer 1895	Philippines(Negros and Luzon )	0–1,400 metres (0–4,593 ft)
	Paphiopedilum intaniae Cavestro 2000	Indonesia (Sulawesi) )	700–1,070 metres (2,300–3,510 ft)
	Paphiopedilum kolopakingii Fowlie 1984	Borneo (Kalimantan)	550–1,000 metres (1,800–3,280 ft)
	Paphiopedilum lowii (Lindl.) Pfitzer 1895	Borneo, Sumatra, Java, and Indonesia	200–1,700 metres (660–5,580 ft)
	Paphiopedilum ooii Koop. 1999	Malaysia (Sabah)	1,050 metres (3,440 ft)
	Paphiopedilum parishii [Rchb.f] Stein 1894	northern Thailand, Myanmar, and China (Yunnan)	1,000–1,400 metres (3,300–4,600 ft)
	Paphiopedilum philippinense [Rchb.f]Stein 1892	Borneo, Guimaras Island, Philippines (Negros, Augusan, Surigao del Norte, Mindinao, and Palawan)	0–500 metres (0–1,640 ft)
	Paphiopedilum platyphyllum Yukawa ex Gruss 2001	Malaysia (Bukit Kana)	800 metres (2,600 ft)
	Paphiopedilum randsii Fowlie 1969	Philippines (Angusan)	460–500 metres (1,510–1,640 ft)
	Paphiopedilum rothschildianum (Rchb. f.) Pfitzer 1895	Borneo (Sabah)	460–850 metres (1,510–2,790 ft)
	Paphiopedilum sanderianum (Rchb.f.) Stein 1892	northwestern Borneo (Gunung Mulu)	100–500 metres (330–1,640 ft)
	Paphiopedilum stonei (Hook.f.) Pfitzer 1895	Borneo (Sarawak)	61–820 metres (200–2,690 ft)
	Paphiopedilum supardii Braem & Lob 1985	Borneo (Balikpapan and Kalimantan)	550–880 metres (1,800–2,890 ft)
	Paphiopedilum wilhelminae L.O.Williams 1942	Indonesia (Irian Jaya)	61–820 metres (200–2,690 ft)
