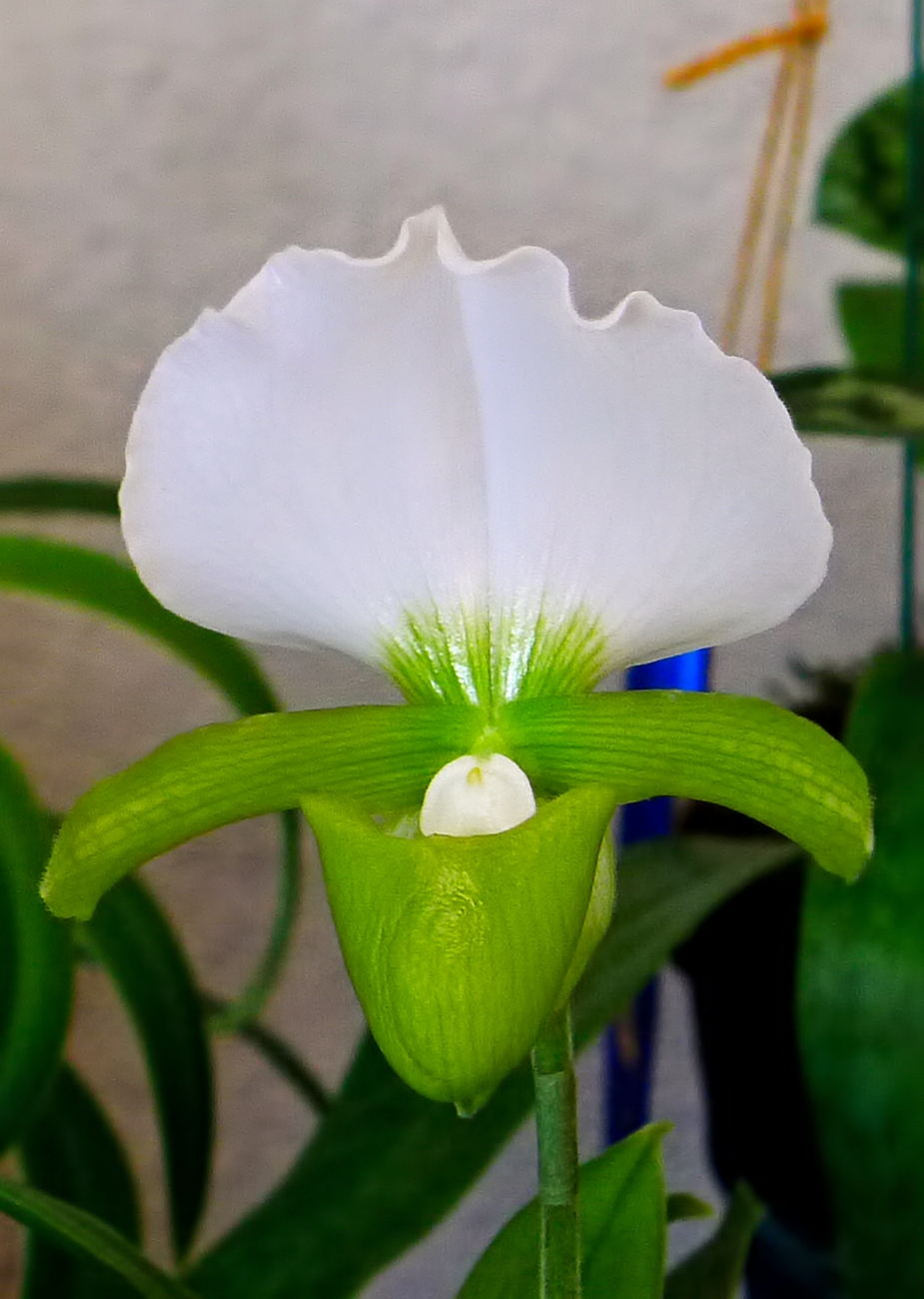
- Paphiopedilum charlesworthii var. alba

Scientific classification
- Kingdom: Plantae
- Clade: Tracheophytes
- Clade: Angiosperms
- Clade: Monocots
- Order: Asparagales
- Family: Orchidaceae
- Subfamily: Cypripedioideae
- Genus: Paphiopedilum
- Subgenus: Paphiopedilum subg. Paphiopedilum; Karasawa & Saito 1982

Type species
- Paphiopedilum insigne

Species
- See text

= Paphiopedilum subg. Paphiopedilum =

Subgenus of flowering plants

Paphiopedilum subgenus Paphiopedilum is a subgenus of the genus Paphiopedilum.

== Distribution ==
Plants from this section are found from Bhutan, Bangladesh, south to Myanmar, Thailand, Laos and Vietnam to west China.

== Species ==
Paphiopedilum subgenus Paphiopedilum comprises the following species:

Image	Name	Distribution	Elevation (m)
	Paphiopedilum barbigerum Tang & F.T.Wang 1940	China(Yunnan, Guizhou, and Guangxi), Vietnam, and Thailand.	300–760 metres (980–2,490 ft)
	Paphiopedilum charlesworthii (Rolfe) Pfitzer 1895	Assam India, Myanmar, Thailand, and SW China	1,200–1,600 metres (3,900–5,200 ft)
	Paphiopedilum coccineum Perner & Herrmann 2000	Vietnam	600–1,000 metres (2,000–3,300 ft)
	Paphiopedilum druryi (Bedd.) Pfitzer 1895	South India	1,500–1,800 metres (4,900–5,900 ft)
	Paphiopedilum erythroanthum	China(Yunnan)	1,300 metres (4,300 ft)
	Paphiopedilum exul (Ridl.) Kervoche 1894	Thailand	6–30 metres (20–98 ft)
	Paphiopedilum fairrieanum	India(Himalayas and Sikkim), Bhutan	1,300–2,200 metres (4,300–7,200 ft)
	Paphiopedilum gratrixianum (Mast.) Guillaumin 1924	Laos(Pak Song), Vietnam	910–1,900 metres (2,990–6,230 ft)
	Paphiopedilum helenae Aver. 1996	Vietnam (Cao Bang)	600–850 metres (1,970–2,790 ft)
	Paphiopedilum henryanum Braem 1987	China(Yunnan, Guangxi)	910–1,400 metres (2,990–4,590 ft)
	Paphiopedilum herrmannii Füchs & Reisinger 1995	Vietnam	700–900 metres (2,300–3,000 ft)
	Paphiopedilum hirsutissimum (Lindl. ex Hook. f.) Pfitzer 1892	Bangladesh, India (Assam), Thailand, Vietnam, Laos, southern China.	700–1,800 metres (2,300–5,900 ft)
	Paphiopedilum insigne [Lindley]Pfitz 1888	India (Assam, Meghalaya, Manipur), Nepal, Myanmar	910–1,500 metres (2,990–4,920 ft)
	Paphiopedilum notatisepalum	China (Yunnan)	1,300 metres (4,300 ft)
	Paphiopedilum papilio-laoticus Schuit., Luang Aphay & Iio 2018	Laos (Sulivong Luangaphay)	
	Paphiopedilum spicerianum [Rchb.f]Pfitz. 1888	Barak and Sonai river gorges in Assam, India	370–1,550 metres (1,210–5,090 ft)
	Paphiopedilum stenolomum Z.J.Liu, O.Gruss & L.J.Chen 2011	China(Yunnan)	
	Paphiopedilum tigrinum Koop. & N. Hasegawa 1990	Myanmar and China	1,300–1,900 metres (4,300–6,200 ft)
	Paphiopedilum tranlienianum O.Gruss & H.Perner 1998	Vietnam.	400–750 metres (1,310–2,460 ft)
	Paphiopedilum vejvarutianum O.Gruss & Roellke 2003	Thailand (Kanchanaburi)	500–750 metres (1,640–2,460 ft)
	Paphiopedilum villosum (Lindl.) Pfitzer 1895	Assam India; Northern Burma; Northern Thailand; and Yunnan China	1,200–1,500 metres (3,900–4,900 ft)
