= Paphiopedilum intaniae =

Conservation status
- Critically Endangered (IUCN 3.1)

Scientific classification
- Kingdom: Plantae
- Clade: Tracheophytes
- Clade: Angiosperms
- Clade: Monocots
- Order: Asparagales
- Family: Orchidaceae
- Subfamily: Cypripedioideae
- Genus: Paphiopedilum
- Species: P. intaniae

Binomial name
- Paphiopedilum intaniae Cavestro

Species of orchid

Paphiopedilum intaniae, commonly known as the intani paphiopedilum, is a critically endangered species of slipper orchid, endemic to the island of Sulawesi in Indonesia. It was formally described in 2000 by Dr. William Cavestro in the Rhone-Alpes Orchidées journal. This species is part of the genus Paphiopedilum and is closely related to Paphiopedilum philippinense, P. randsii, and P. stonei.

== Description ==
Paphiopedilum intaniae is a terrestrial herbaceous orchid with 4 to 7 linear, leathery green leaves that are obtuse at the apex and range from 25 to 40 cm in length. It produces an erect, brown-pubescent inflorescence 35 to 50 cm long, bearing 3 to 8 flowers, each measuring approximately 10 to 12 cm across.

The flowers are distinctive with lanceolate dorsal sepals striated in brown, and narrow, non-twisted petals marked with brown maculations and striations. Notably, the petals bear 4 to 6 small, ciliate warts near their bases - a feature absent in related species. The lip is pale yellow and reticulated with pale brown, and the staminode is bilobed with a reticulate pattern and a small central notch.

Key distinguishing features from P. stonei include a shorter, hairy ovary and pedicel, differences in petal ornamentation, and the unique shape and structure of the staminode.

== Distribution and habitat ==
Paphiopedilum intaniae is known only from a restricted area near Gunung Morowali in east-central Sulawesi, Indonesia, at elevations of approximately 700 to 1,070 meters above sea level. It grows on limestone cliffs and sandstone hills, typically rooted in moss and humus-filled crevices between rocks. The habitat is characterized by high rainfall from autumn through spring and moderate precipitation in summer, with conditions rarely becoming dry.

== Cultivation ==
This orchid requires intermediate to warm temperatures and moderate to bright light. It is best cultivated in a well-draining medium such as fir bark with perlite or sphagnum moss. Watering every four to five days is recommended, avoiding salt accumulation in the medium. Slight temperature drops for several weeks may induce flowering. Buds develop richer coloration when shaded.

== Conservation status ==
According to the IUCN Red List, Paphiopedilum intaniae is listed as Critically Endangered. The species has an estimated extent of occurrence and area of occupancy of just 4 km², with a single known subpopulation of fewer than 50 mature individuals. The main threats to Paphiopedilum intaniae include illegal collection for the horticultural trade, ongoing habitat destruction due to deforestation, and the overall vulnerability associated with its small population size and limited range. These factors have led to a continued decline in both population numbers and habitat quality.

== Conservation measures ==
Conservation efforts for Paphiopedilum intaniae include legal protection under Appendix I of CITES, which prohibits international trade in wild-collected specimens. Additional recommended actions involve protecting and managing its known habitat, promoting ex situ conservation through artificial propagation, and using cultivated specimens in trade to reduce pressure on wild populations. Further field surveys are suggested to locate any additional populations, along with ongoing monitoring of the existing site and population dynamics.

== Taxonomic note ==
While described as a distinct species, the taxonomic status of Paphiopedilum intaniae has been debated. Some experts, including Braem (2004), have suggested it may be a natural hybrid, possibly involving P. philippinense, P. parishii, or P. dianthum. However, this hypothesis remains unconfirmed pending cytogenetic studies.
