= Paphiopedilum adductum =

Conservation status
- Critically Endangered (IUCN 3.1)

Scientific classification
- Kingdom: Plantae
- Clade: Tracheophytes
- Clade: Angiosperms
- Clade: Monocots
- Order: Asparagales
- Family: Orchidaceae
- Subfamily: Cypripedioideae
- Genus: Paphiopedilum
- Species: P. adductum

Binomial name
- Paphiopedilum adductum Asher (1983)

Species of orchid

Paphiopedilum adductum is a species of slipper orchid in the family Orchidaceae. It is endemic to Mindanao Island of the Philippines. Its natural habitat is subtropical or tropical moist lowland forests. It is threatened by habitat loss and overcollection.

== Taxonomy ==
P. adductum was first officially described in Orchid Digest in 1983, with it epithet derived from Latin adductum ("adducted"), referring to the staminode's shape which are prominently bent backwards. During the time, it was often confused with P. elliotianum (now P. rothschildianum).

== Description ==
P. adductum is a wet tropical biome, perennial slipper orchid with leaves of 6 leaves of 23–26 centimetres (9.1–10.2 in) long and about 4 centimetres (1.6 in) wide, being dark green in colour with a paler margin. Its purple, pubescent inflorescence, being 20–34 centimetres (7.9–13.4 in) tall, consists of 2 or 3 flowers measuring 6–10 centimetres (2.4–3.9 in) wide and 14–18 centimetres (5.5–7.1 in) tall.

P. adductum has a single variant, P. adductum var. anitum, which has a darker coloration.

== Distribution ==
P. adductum is endemic to Mindanao in the Philippines, specifically around the area of Bukidnon, in elevations of 1,250–1,350 metres (4,100–4,430 ft) and mean temperatures of 19–23 °C (66–73 °F).

== Cultivation ==
P. adductum is considered to be difficult to cultivate as its new roots are generated only once annually, thus needed proper timing. Nevertheless, various hybrids are available with P. adductum, such as with P. glanduliferum ("Predacious"), with P. philippinense ("Addicted Phillip"), and with P. glaucophyllum ("Bianka").
