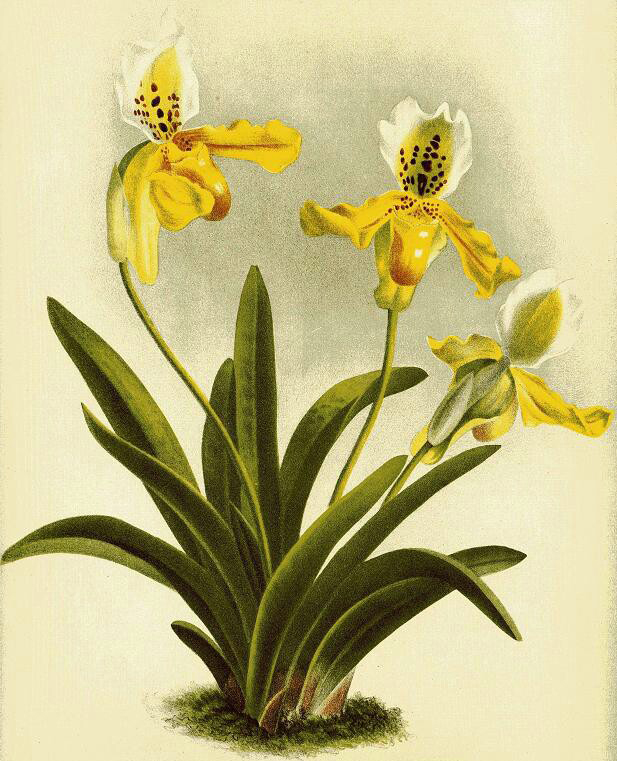
- Flower of Paphiopedilum exul

Scientific classification
- Kingdom: Plantae
- Clade: Tracheophytes
- Clade: Angiosperms
- Clade: Monocots
- Order: Asparagales
- Family: Orchidaceae
- Subfamily: Cypripedioideae
- Genus: Paphiopedilum
- Species: P. exul

Binomial name
- Paphiopedilum exul (Ridl.) Rolfe

Synonyms
- Cypripedium insigne var. exul Ridl. (basionym); Cypripedium exul (Ridl.) Rolfe; Paphiopedilum exul var. aureum auct.; Cordula exul (Ridl.) Rolfe; Paphiopedilum exul f. aureum (auct.) O.Gruss & Roellke

= Paphiopedilum exul =

Species of orchid

Paphiopedilum exul is a species of slipper orchid endemic to the Krabi region in peninsular Thailand. Its greenish yellow flowers appear from February to May. Various hybrids are cultivated involving P. exul.

== Taxonomy ==
P. exul was first described by Henry Nicholas Ridley in 1891, originally as Cypripedium insigne (now P. insigne) var. exul, where he originally procured the orchid by a native collector from Siam to his working place in Singapore. The epithet of P. exul is based on Latin exsilium ("in exile"), due to its geographical separation from typical habitats of P. insigne. It was shortly after reclassified as a standalone species of C. exul by Rolfe in Le livre des orchidées in 1894, before the genus was reclassified by him to Paphiopedilum in 1896.

== Description ==
P. exul is a terrestrial or lithophytic herb, with an erect growth form which grows in a humus medium. consists of 4 to 5 leaves of 15–35 centimetres (5.9–13.8 in) in length and 1.5–3 centimetres (0.59–1.18 in) wide, with above surface being bright to yellow-green in colour, while its lower surface is keeled. Its green, shortly purple-pubescent inflorescence, being 13–18 centimetres (5.1–7.1 in) long, has a single flower that blooms up to 5–7 centimetres (2.0–2.8 in) wide. Peak flowering occurs in April and May.

== Distribution ==
P. exul is endemic to the limestone islands of the Krabi region in southern Thailand, from sea level elevation to 50 metres (160 ft), with mean temperature range of 26–28 °C (79–82 °F).

== Biochemical profile ==
A 2024 isolation research discovered a new alkyl benzoquinone, and a new trans-stilbenoid, together with several known stilbenoids and flavonoids from P. exul roots and leaves, with one of the identified molecules was highly cytotoxic to cancer cells.
