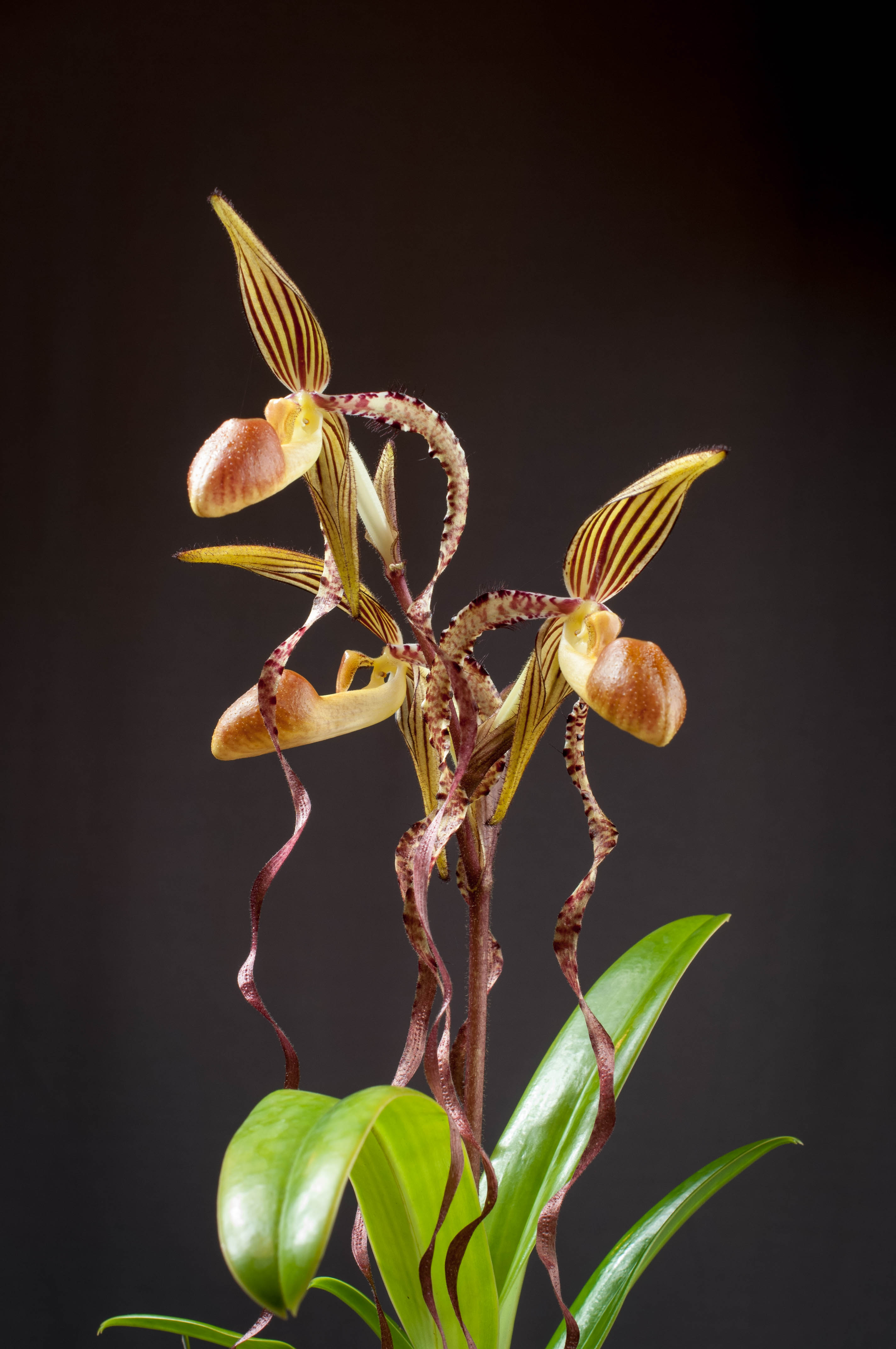

Scientific classification
- Kingdom: Plantae
- Clade: Tracheophytes
- Clade: Angiosperms
- Clade: Monocots
- Order: Asparagales
- Family: Orchidaceae
- Subfamily: Cypripedioideae
- Genus: Paphiopedilum
- Species: P. sanderianum

Binomial name
- Paphiopedilum sanderianum (Rchb.f.) Stein

Synonyms
- Cypripedium sanderianum Rchb.f. (basionym); Cordula sanderiana (Rchb.f.) Rolfe

= Paphiopedilum sanderianum =

Species of orchid

Paphiopedilum sanderianum is a rare species of orchid endemic to northwestern Borneo (Gunung Mulu). First discovered in 1885 by F. Sander's collector, J. Foerstermann, the orchid became renowned for the remarkable length of its petals, which can measure over 1 m long. The largest in recent times was one grown in 1999 by Dr. John M. Doherty with petals 90 cm long. Although P. sanderianum has been used as a parent in a number of crosses, none of the resulting hybrids have so far matched the extraordinary lengths of this species' petals. However, soon after the turn of the 20th century, this rare orchid was lost to cultivation and thought to be extinct in the wild, until its rediscovery in 1978 by Ivan Nielson. The wild population of Paphiopedilum sanderianum grows protected in Gunung Mulu National Park.

== Species description ==
- medium-sized, hot to warm growing, lithophytic species from Borneo.
- Mature plants will bloom with 2-5 simultaneously opening reddish brown flowers that are 7–10 cm wide, with spiraling lateral sepals that can reach a meter in length.
- each growth fan will contain 4-5 glossy light green leaves, that are up to 45 cm long and 4–6 cm wide
- flower lifespan: 5–7 weeks
- Flask to flowering approx: 6yrs.
- chromosome count: 2n=26

== Habitat data ==
- Distribution - found in and around Gunung Mulu National Park
- Elevation: 100–500 m
- Peak Flowering in the Wild: April–June
- Ecology: found at the top of steep dolomite limestone pinnacles
- Mean Temperature Range: 22-25 °C
- Light: moderately deep shade
- Medium: calcareous, pH 7.3-7.5, mosses and leaf litter, roots attached to rock
- Water: high amount of annual rainfall, spread throughout the year
