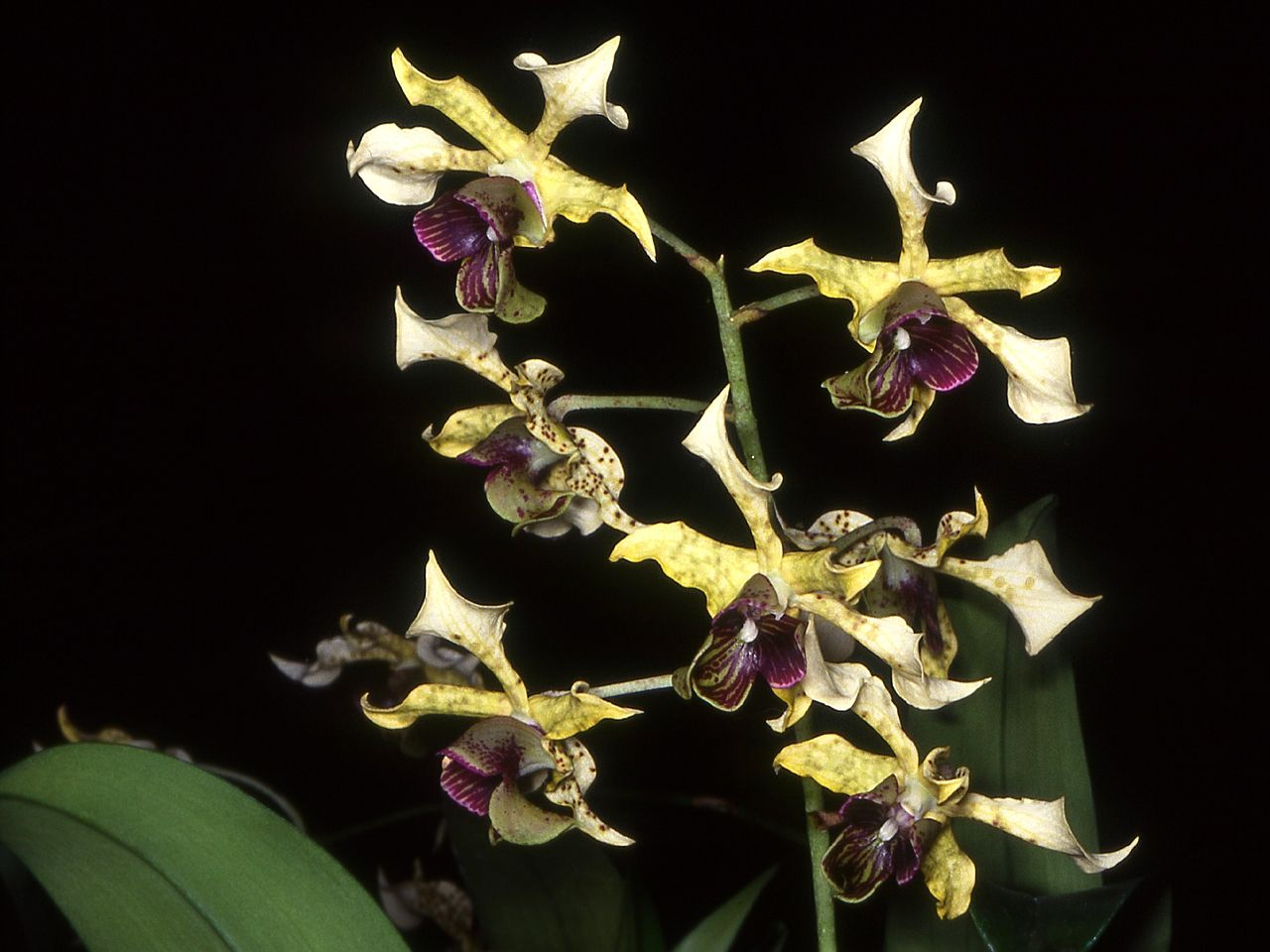

Conservation status
- Vulnerable (IUCN 3.1)
- CITES Appendix II

Scientific classification
- Kingdom: Plantae
- Clade: Tracheophytes
- Clade: Angiosperms
- Clade: Monocots
- Order: Asparagales
- Family: Orchidaceae
- Subfamily: Epidendroideae
- Genus: Dendrobium
- Species: D. atroviolaceum

Binomial name
- Dendrobium atroviolaceum Rolfe

Synonyms
- Dendrobium macgregorii F.Muell. & Kraenzl.; Latourea atroviolacea (Rolfe) Brieger; Latourorchis atroviolacea (Rolfe) Brieger; Sayeria atroviolacea (Rolfe) Rauschert

= Dendrobium atroviolaceum =

Species of orchid

Dendrobium atroviolaceum is a species of epiphytic orchid endemic to eastern New Guinea. It was described by English botanist Robert Allen Rolfe in 1890 based on a specimen collected by James Veitch & Sons.

== Distribution and habitat ==
Dendrobium atroviolaceum is known from the D'Entrecasteaux Islands and the Louisiade Archipelago in Papua New Guinea. It grows on rainforest trees at altitudes of 200–800 m (660–2,620 ft).

== Description ==
Dendrobium atroviolaceium is a compact, upright plant. The pseudobulbs are furrowed, measuring 10–30 cm (3.9–11.8 in) long, swollen in the upper half and tapered towards the base of the plant. Each pseudobulb bears up to six stiff, dark green leaves at its apex. The inflorescence is an erect raceme measuring up to 20 cm (7.9 in) long and bearing up to twenty fragrant, long-lasting flowers that face downwards. The flowers are large, each measuring 4–6 cm (1.6–2.4 in) across. The petals and sepals are cream and marked with purple dots. The fleshy labellum is green on the outside but marked with rich violet-purple stripes on the inside.

== Conservation status ==
Dendrobium atroviolaceum is listed as vulnerable the International Union for Conservation of Nature's Red List under criteria B1ab(iii) and B2ab(iii), based on the limited number of locations at which this species is present in the wild and the threat of habitat degradation. The number of plants that remain in the wild is not known, but a 2018 Red List assessment estimated the extent of occurrence to be around 13,800 km^{2} (5,300 sq mi). The same assessment noted that further surveys are urgently needed to confirm the current distribution and population size of D. atroviolaceum, and to ascertain the status of its habitat.

D. atroviolaceum is threatened by droughts, landslides, and cyclones, as well as small-scale agriculture, mining, and logging. Though protected under the Convention on International Trade in Endangered Species of Wild Fauna and Flora, the threat of poaching remains.

== Cultivation ==
Dendrobium atroviolaceum has been used extensively in the breeding of hybrid orchids. In cultivation, it requires warm, humid conditions and filtered sunlight. It can tolerate night temperatures as low as 5 °C (41 °F) as long as daytime temperatures remain warm. Flowering can occur at any time, but typically occurs from autumn to spring. The flowers may last for three months or more.
