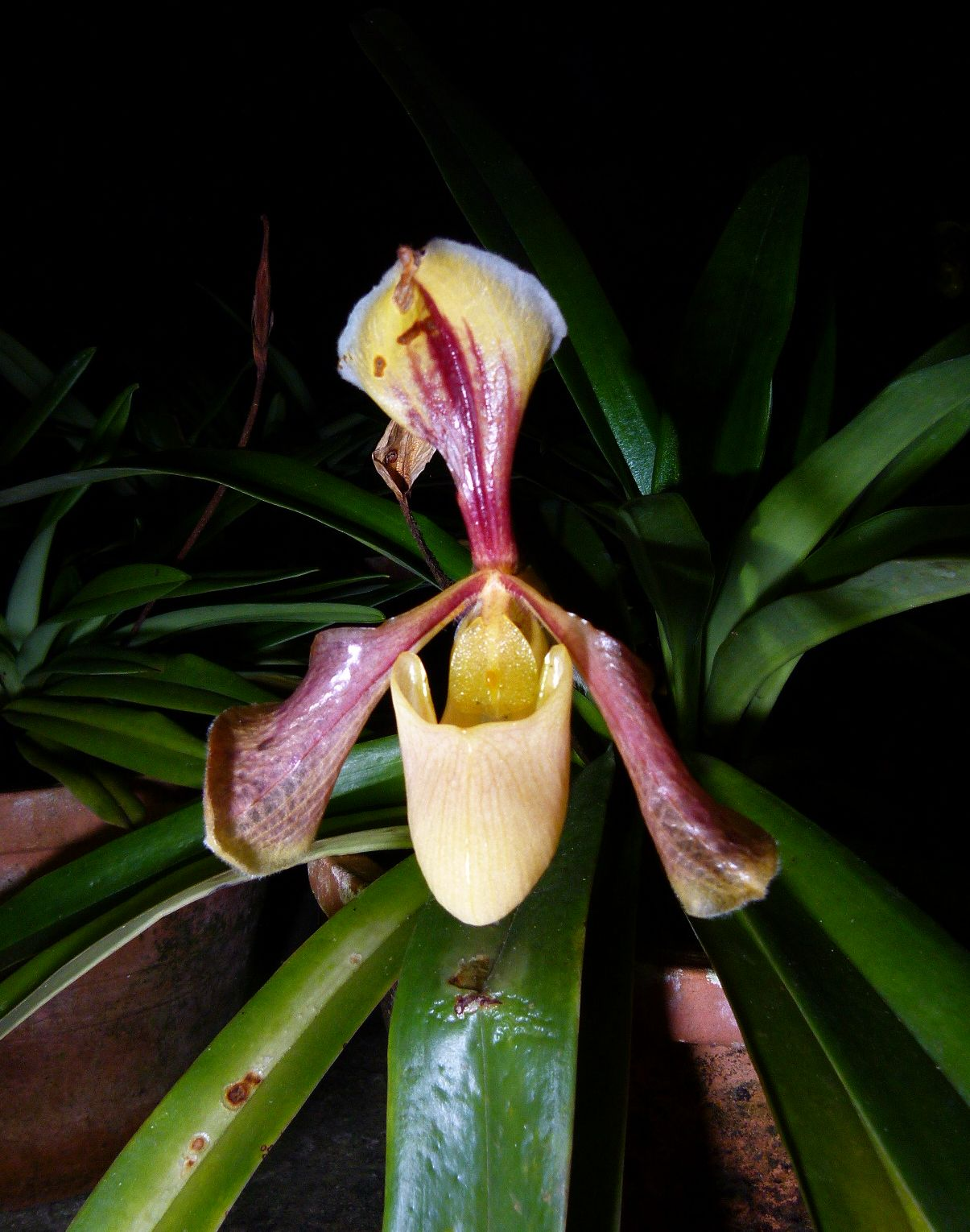
- Flower of Paphiopedilum villosum

Scientific classification
- Kingdom: Plantae
- Clade: Tracheophytes
- Clade: Angiosperms
- Clade: Monocots
- Order: Asparagales
- Family: Orchidaceae
- Subfamily: Cypripedioideae
- Genus: Paphiopedilum
- Species: P. villosum

Binomial name
- Paphiopedilum villosum (Lindl.) Stein

Synonyms
- Cypripedium villosum Lindl. (basionym); Cordula villosa (Lindl.) Rolfe; Paphiopedilum villosum f. aureum Braem; Paphiopedilum densissimum Z.J.Liu & S.C.Chen; Paphiopedilum macranthum Z.J.Liu & S.C.Chen; Paphiopedilum villosum var. fuscoroseum Aver.; Paphiopedilum villosum var. fuscoviride Aver.; Paphiopedilum villosum f. fuscoroseum (Aver.) O.Gruss & M.Wolff; Paphiopedilum villosum f. fuscoviride (Aver.) O.Gruss & M.Wolff; Paphiopedilum cornutum Liu, Gruss & Chen 2011

= Paphiopedilum villosum =

Species of orchid

Paphiopedilum villosum is a species of orchid found Assam, southern China and the Myanmar states of Kachin, Kayar, Shan and the Upper Sagaing region. The population is declining across its range and the species is listed as vulnerable by the IUCN due to habitat degradation and poaching for the global plant trade.
