= Oeceoclades ugandae =

Scientific classification
- Kingdom: Plantae
- Clade: Tracheophytes
- Clade: Angiosperms
- Clade: Monocots
- Order: Asparagales
- Family: Orchidaceae
- Subfamily: Epidendroideae
- Genus: Oeceoclades
- Species: O. ugandae

Binomial name
- Oeceoclades ugandae (Rolfe) Garay & P.Taylor

Synonyms
- Eulophia ugandae Rolfe

Species of orchid

Oeceoclades ugandae is a terrestrial orchid species in the genus Oeceoclades that is native to parts of tropical Africa, including west tropical Africa (Ghana and Ivory Coast), west-central tropical Africa (Gulf of Guinea islands and the Democratic Republic of the Congo), northeast tropical Africa (Ethiopia), and east tropical Africa (Kenya and Uganda). It was first described by the British botanist Robert Allen Rolfe in 1913 as Eulophia ugandae and later transferred to the genus Oeceoclades in 1976 when Leslie Andrew Garay and Peter Taylor resurrected and revised that genus. The English botanist V.S. Summerhayes treated this species as a synonym of O. latifolia, but Garay and Taylor noted that while the two species share a superficial resemblance in the appearance of the labellum, they are distinct in vegetative morphology. The labellum of O. ugandae also has two swellings or protuberances between the lateral and midlobes, a feature that O. latifolia lacks.
