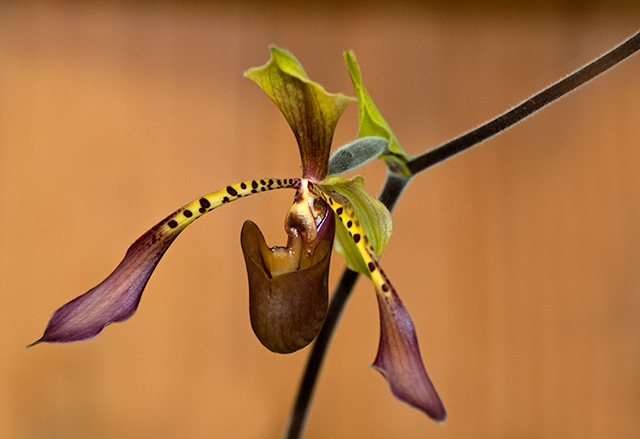
- Flower of Paphiopedilum lowii

Scientific classification
- Kingdom: Plantae
- Clade: Tracheophytes
- Clade: Angiosperms
- Clade: Monocots
- Order: Asparagales
- Family: Orchidaceae
- Subfamily: Cypripedioideae
- Genus: Paphiopedilum
- Species: P. lowii

Binomial name
- Paphiopedilum lowii (Lindl.) Stein (1892)

Synonyms
- Cypripedium lowii Lindl. (basionym); Cypripedium cruciforme Zoll. & Moritzi; Cordula lowii (Lindl.) Rolfe; Paphiopedilum lowii var. aureum P.J.Cribb; Paphiopedilum lowii f. aureum (P.J.Cribb) P.J.Cribb

= Paphiopedilum lowii =

Species of orchid

Paphiopedilum lowii is a species of orchid that occurs in Indonesia, Malaysia, and the Philippines.
