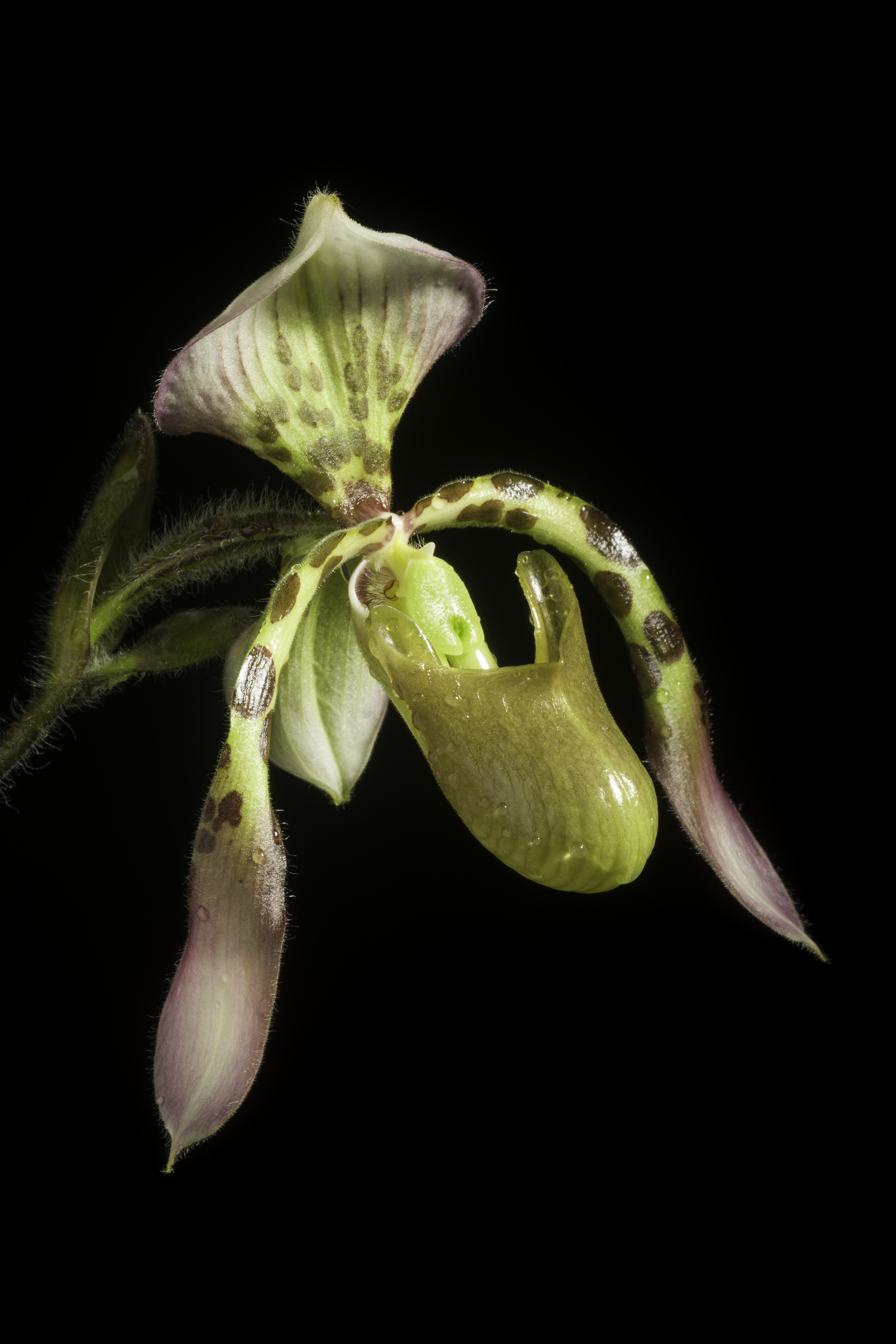
- Flower of Paphiopedilum haynaldianum

Scientific classification
- Kingdom: Plantae
- Clade: Tracheophytes
- Clade: Angiosperms
- Clade: Monocots
- Order: Asparagales
- Family: Orchidaceae
- Subfamily: Cypripedioideae
- Genus: Paphiopedilum
- Species: P. haynaldianum

Binomial name
- Paphiopedilum haynaldianum (Rchb.f.) Stein

Synonyms
- Cypripedium haynaldianum Rchb.f. (basionym); Cordula haynaldiana (Rchb.f.) Rolfe; Paphiopedilum haynaldianum f. album Asher ex O.Gruss & Roeth

= Paphiopedilum haynaldianum =

Species of orchid

Paphiopedilum haynaldianum is a species of orchid endemic to the islands of Negros and Luzon of the Philippines.

== Varieties ==
- Paphiopedilum haynaldium var. laurae
