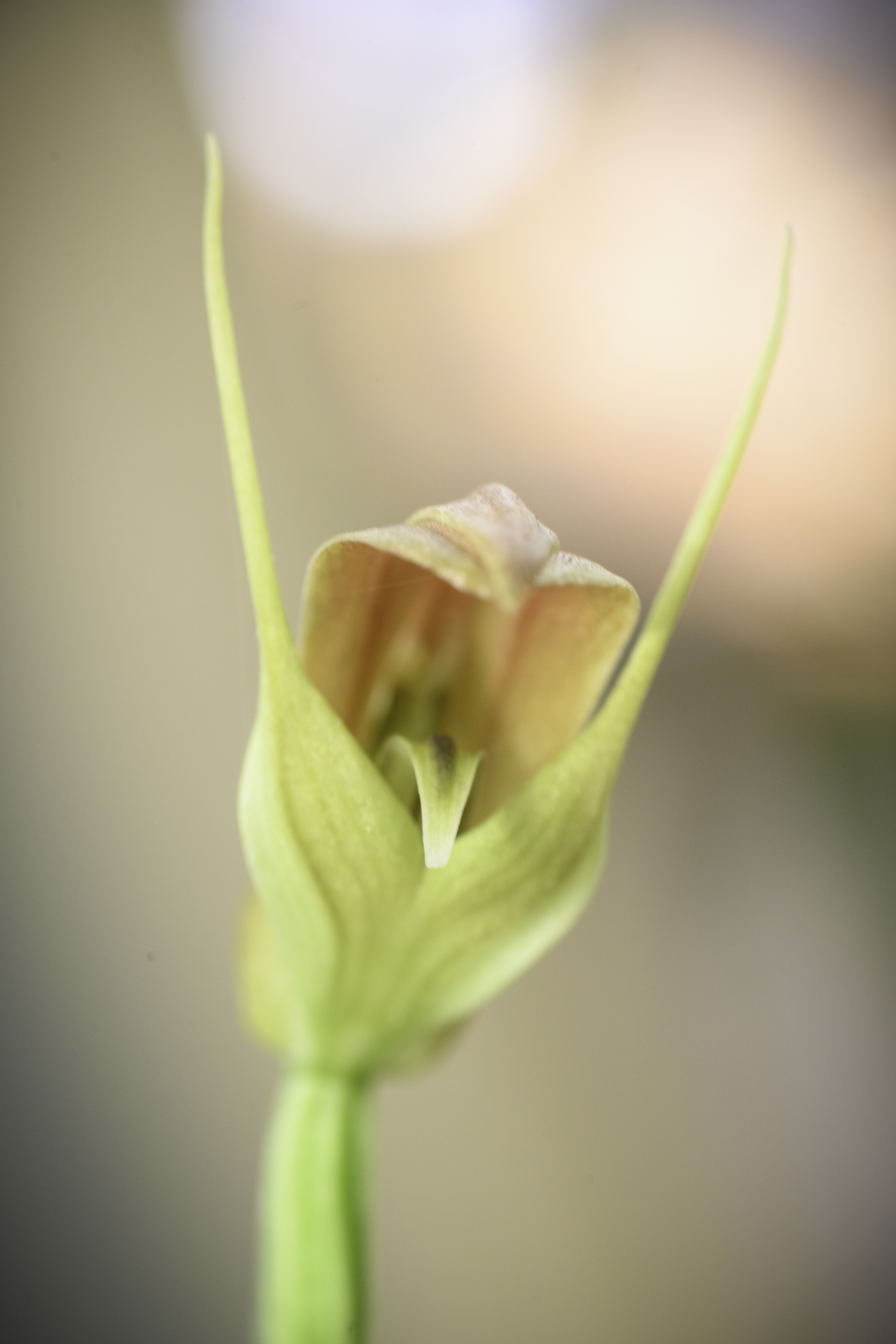

Scientific classification
- Kingdom: Plantae
- Clade: Embryophytes
- Clade: Tracheophytes
- Clade: Angiosperms
- Clade: Monocots
- Order: Asparagales
- Family: Orchidaceae
- Subfamily: Orchidoideae
- Tribe: Cranichideae
- Genus: Pterostylis
- Species: P. papuana

Binomial name
- Pterostylis papuana Rolfe

Synonyms
- Pterostylis arfakensis (J.J.Sm.) D.L.Jones & M.A.Clem.; Pterostylis braemii H.Mohr; Pterostylis novoguineensis Ridl.; Pterostylis papuana var. arfakensis J.J.Sm.; Pterostylis papuana var. seranica J.J.Sm.

= Pterostylis papuana =

Species of orchid

Pterostylis papuana is a plant in the orchid family Orchidaceae and is endemic to New Guinea and the Maluku and Solomon Islands. It typically grows to a height of about 180 mm (7.1 in), the leaves at the base oblong to egg-shaped, 25–30 mm (0.98–1.18 in) long and 11–14 mm (0.43–0.55 in) wide on a petiole 13–20 mm (0.51–0.79 in) long. Each plant has a single pale green and white flower tinged with reddish-brown, the dorsal sepal oblong and about 50 mm (2.0 in) long, the lateral sepals and petals 25 mm (0.98 in) long. The labellum is narrowly lance-shaped and 20–22 mm (0.79–0.87 in) long.

This orchid was first formally described in 1899 by Robert Allen Rolfe in the Kew Bulletin of Miscellaneous Information from specimens collected on Mount Scratchley at an altitude of 12,200 ft (3,700 m).
