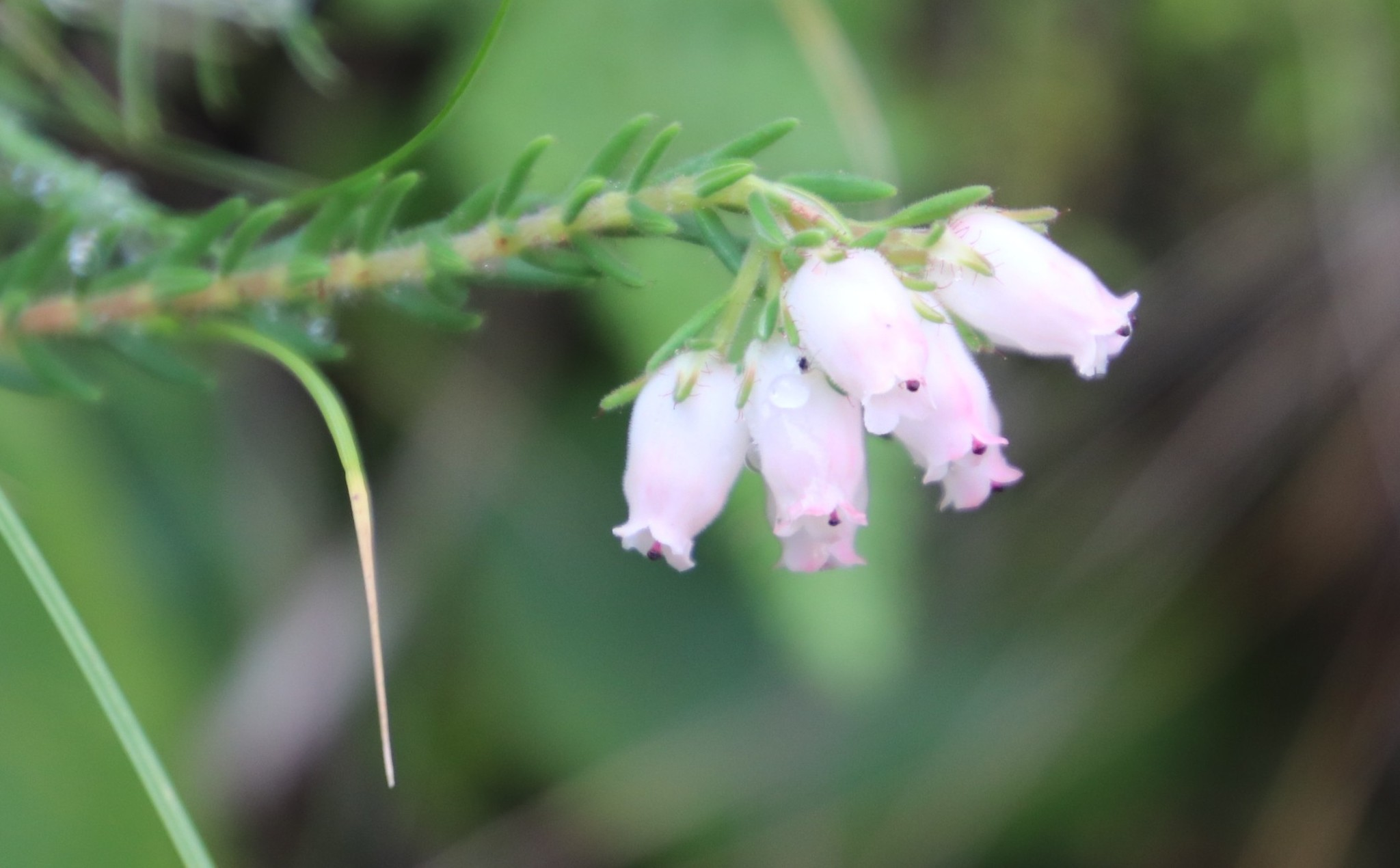

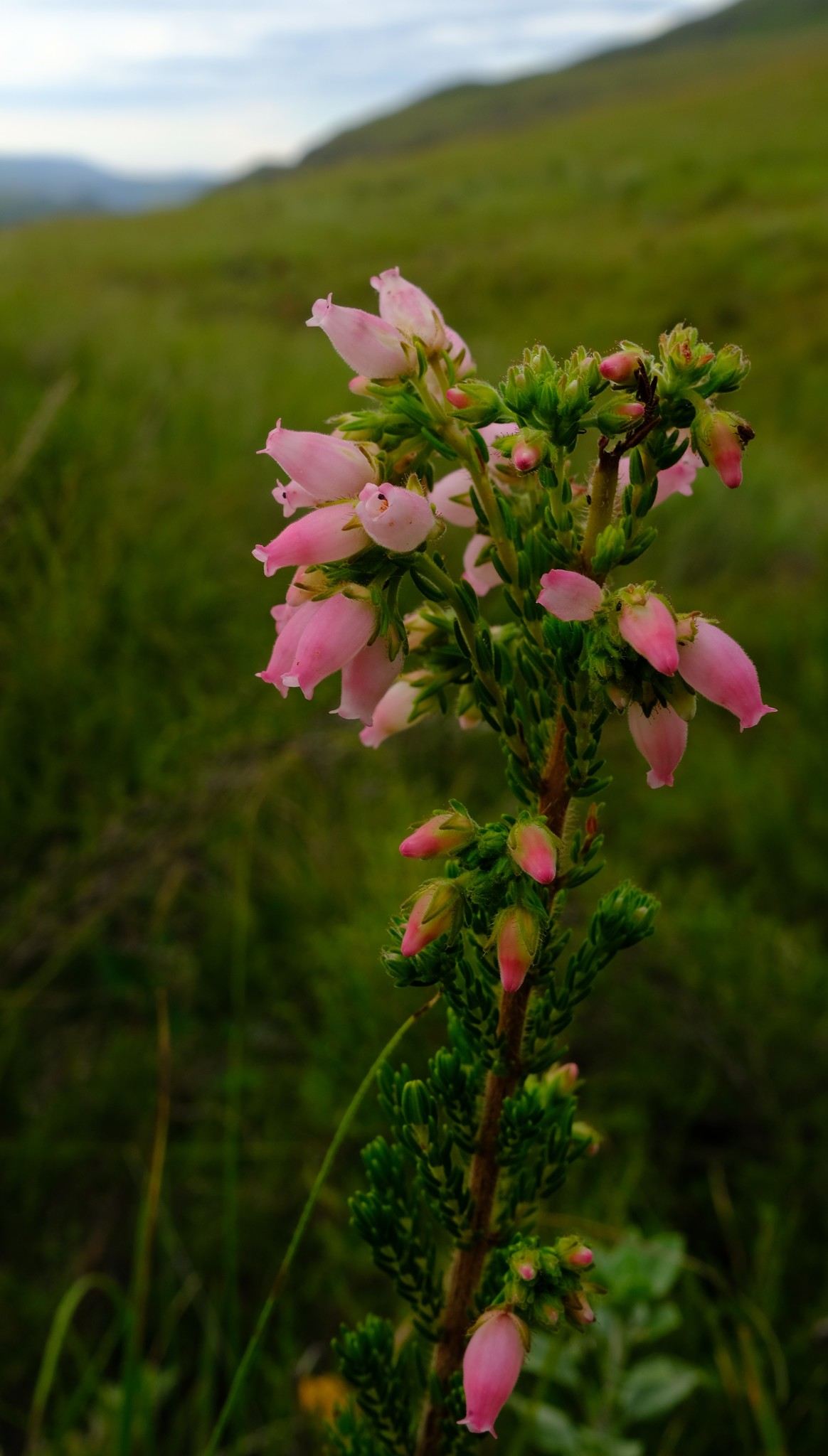

Scientific classification
- Kingdom: Plantae
- Clade: Tracheophytes
- Clade: Angiosperms
- Clade: Eudicots
- Clade: Asterids
- Order: Ericales
- Family: Ericaceae
- Genus: Erica
- Species: E. oatesii

Binomial name
- Erica oatesii Rolfe, (1889)

= Erica oatesii =

Species of flowering plant

Erica oatesii, the winter fire heath, is a plant belonging to the genus Erica. The species is native to the Free State, KwaZulu-Natal, Limpopo, Mpumalanga, North West, and Eswatini provinces of South Africa.
