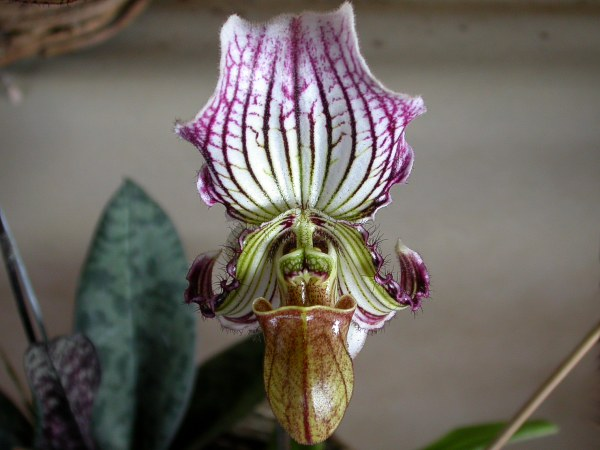
- Flower of Paphiopedilum fairrieanum

Scientific classification
- Kingdom: Plantae
- Clade: Tracheophytes
- Clade: Angiosperms
- Clade: Monocots
- Order: Asparagales
- Family: Orchidaceae
- Subfamily: Cypripedioideae
- Genus: Paphiopedilum
- Species: P. fairrieanum

Binomial name
- Paphiopedilum fairrieanum (Rchb.f.) Stein

Synonyms
- Cypripedium fairrieanum Lindl. (basionym); Cypripedium assamicum Linden ex K.Koch & Fintelm.; Cordula fairrieana (Lindl.) Rolfe; Paphiopedilum fairrieanum var. bohlmannianum Matho; Paphiopedilum fairrieanum var. giganteum Pradhan; Paphiopedilum fairrieanum var. nigrescens Pradhan; Paphiopedilum fairrieanum f. bohlmannianum (Matho) Braem

= Paphiopedilum fairrieanum =

Species of orchid

Paphiopedilum fairrieanum is a species of orchid occurring from the eastern Himalaya to Assam.

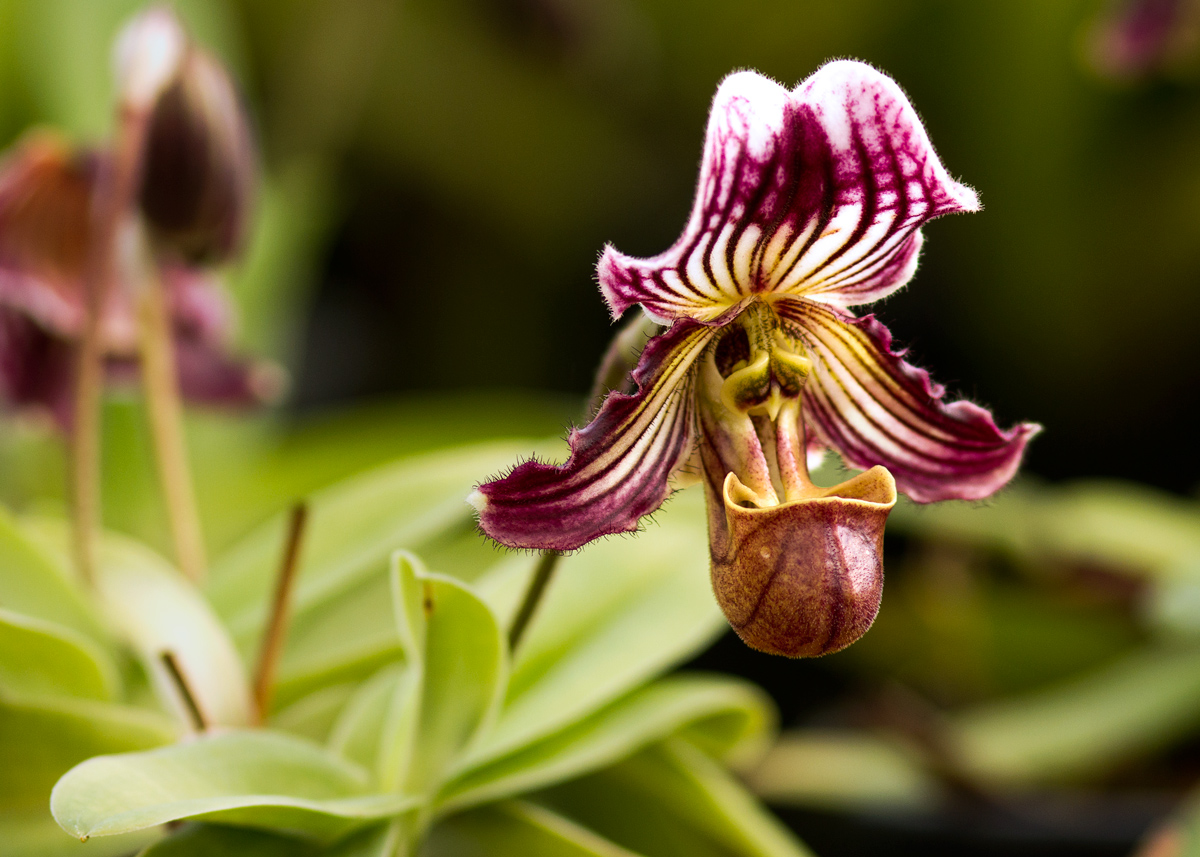
Paphiopedilum fairrieanum orchid from Eastern Himalayas, India
