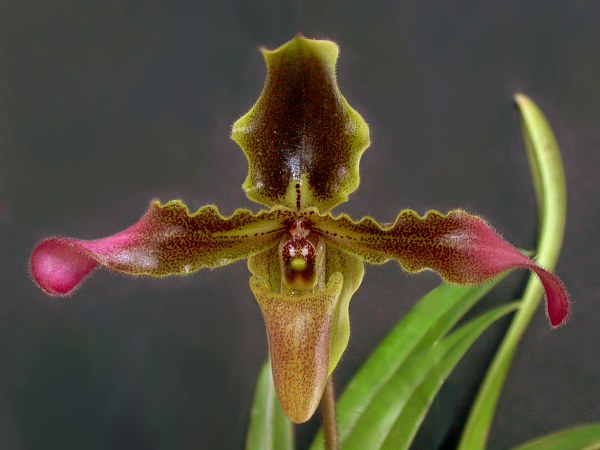
- Flower of Paphiopedilum hirsutissimum

Scientific classification
- Kingdom: Plantae
- Clade: Tracheophytes
- Clade: Angiosperms
- Clade: Monocots
- Order: Asparagales
- Family: Orchidaceae
- Subfamily: Cypripedioideae
- Genus: Paphiopedilum
- Species: P. hirsutissimum

Binomial name
- Paphiopedilum hirsutissimum (Lindl. ex Hook.) Stein

Synonyms
- Cypripedium hirsutissimum Lindl. ex Hook. (basionym); Cordula hirsutissima (Lindl. ex Hook.) Rolfe

= Paphiopedilum hirsutissimum =

Species of orchid

Paphiopedilum hirsutissimum is a species of orchid ranging from Assam to southern China.
