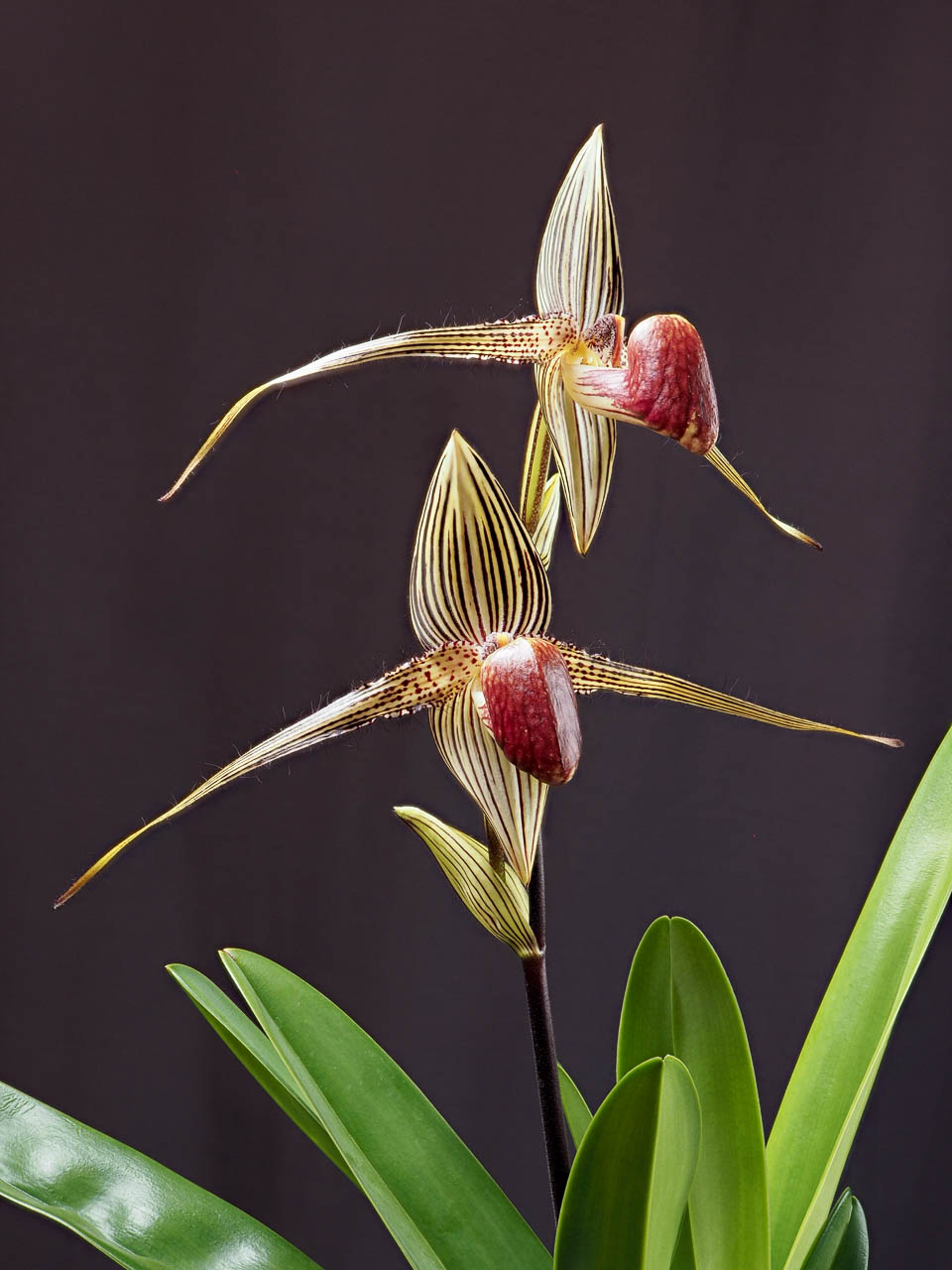

Conservation status
- Critically Endangered (IUCN 3.1)

Scientific classification
- Kingdom: Plantae
- Clade: Tracheophytes
- Clade: Angiosperms
- Clade: Monocots
- Order: Asparagales
- Family: Orchidaceae
- Subfamily: Cypripedioideae
- Genus: Paphiopedilum
- Species: P. rothschildianum

Binomial name
- Paphiopedilum rothschildianum (Rchb.f.) Stein 1888

Synonyms
- Cypripedium rothschildianum Rchb.f. (basionym); Cordula rothschildiana (Rchb.f.) Rolfe; Cypripedium elliottianum O'Brien; Cypripedium neoguineense Linden; Paphiopedilum elliottianum (O'Brien) Stein; Paphiopedilum rothschildianum var. elliottianum (O'Brien) Pfitzer

= Paphiopedilum rothschildianum =

Rothschild's slipper orchid

Paphiopedilum rothschildianum, commonly known as the Gold of Kinabalu orchid or Rothschild's slipper orchid, is a large, clear-leafed species of orchid. It blooms with tall inflorescence of up to six large flowers that are 5-13 inches. It is unique to the Corypetalum group for holding its petals almost horizontally, giving the flower a distinctive appearance. The peak flowering period of this plant is from April to May.

== Origin and Preservation ==
Paphiopedilum rothschildianum is endemic to Mount Kinabalu on Borneo Island, which is a part of the Malaysian state of Sabah. Paphiopedilum rothschildianum has been known as "The King of Orchids", as it is one of the most sought-after and rarest species of orchid in the world.

It was first described in the 19th century by Heinrich Gustav Reichenbach which caused a flurry in those who were seeking to obtain it at any cost. After its discovery, the location was kept a secret by the company Sander & Sons, to purposefully misguide those seeking to find it. It was published that Paphiopedilum rothschildianum was located in New Guinea instead of Mount Kinabalu, where it had actually originated. Due to this misinformation regarding its habitat, the orchid was thought to be extinct until the late 1950s. In 1959, two populations of Paphiopedilum rothschildianum were discovered at the base of Mount Kinabalu, drawing the attention of orchid collectors worldwide.

As of today, Paphiopedilum rothschildianum is critically endangered. The number of individuals found in its natural habitat continues to decrease due to the illegal poaching of Paphiopedilum rothschildianum for regional and international trade, which has continued despite the plants occurring in a protected area. The orchid is highly sought after, with prices reaching as high as US$5000 for a single plant. Furthermore, continued exploitation for horticulture, as well as other disturbances such as mining activities, logging, and habitat destruction (by fire in one specific case), have also been to blame for the significant decrease in Paphiopedilum rothschildianum's natural occurrence.

Preservation attempts are currently underway to protect the orchid, and it is hoped that in the future, propagated Paphiopedilum rothschildianum may be reintroduced into its natural habitat. In the meantime, preservation attempts such as fencing the protected areas and securing them more fully have been suggested, alongside more community awareness so that Paphiopedilum rothschildianum may be able to thrive in the future.

== Distribution ==
Paphiopedilum rothschildianum is found in the rainforests around Mount Kinabalu in northern Borneo, at elevations between 500 and 1200 meters above sea level. It commonly grows as a terrestrial in ultramafic soil but is also found growing as a lithophyte in leaf-litter on ultramafic cliffs, usually near a river. Paphiopedilum rothschildianum is part of a large number of orchid species endemic to the island of Borneo (more specifically, Kinabalu Park) due to the ultramafic soils which characterize the area and have led to the evolution of many other endemic plant species. Ultramafic soil occurs when high concentrations of elements such as chromium, cobalt, and nickel are found. Paphiopedilum rothschildianum is not restricted to growing in ultramafic soils, but it does seem to account for its success on the island.

== Reproduction ==
The flower has a green and red spotted petal, which attracts parasitic flies through resemblance to the aphids they lay eggs on. As the flies brush against the stigma, they release any previously collected pollen and more is deposited onto their bodies from the anther.

== Growth and characteristics ==
Paphiopedilum rothschildianum is a terrestrial, or in some cases, lithophytic species that grows in warm to cool environments. It is rather easy to grow, but takes between 4–5 years to flower, a period which can be prolonged if it is grown in shade. In the summer, Paphiopedilum rothschildianum has an optimal temperature range between 28 and 29 °C during the day and 16-17 °C at night. In winter, the optimal temperature range is between 26 and 27 °C and 15-17 °C at night. Significant temperature differences are beneficial to Paphiopedilum rothschildianum; the region of Mount Kinabalu to which it is endemic has noticeable temperature drops and fluctuations which has caused the orchid to become adapted to this habitat type. Additionally, because Paphiopedilum rothschildianum is often found growing near flowing water, usually about 6–12 meters above streams, humidity is also a necessary component when trying to grow it in places outside of its natural habitat.
