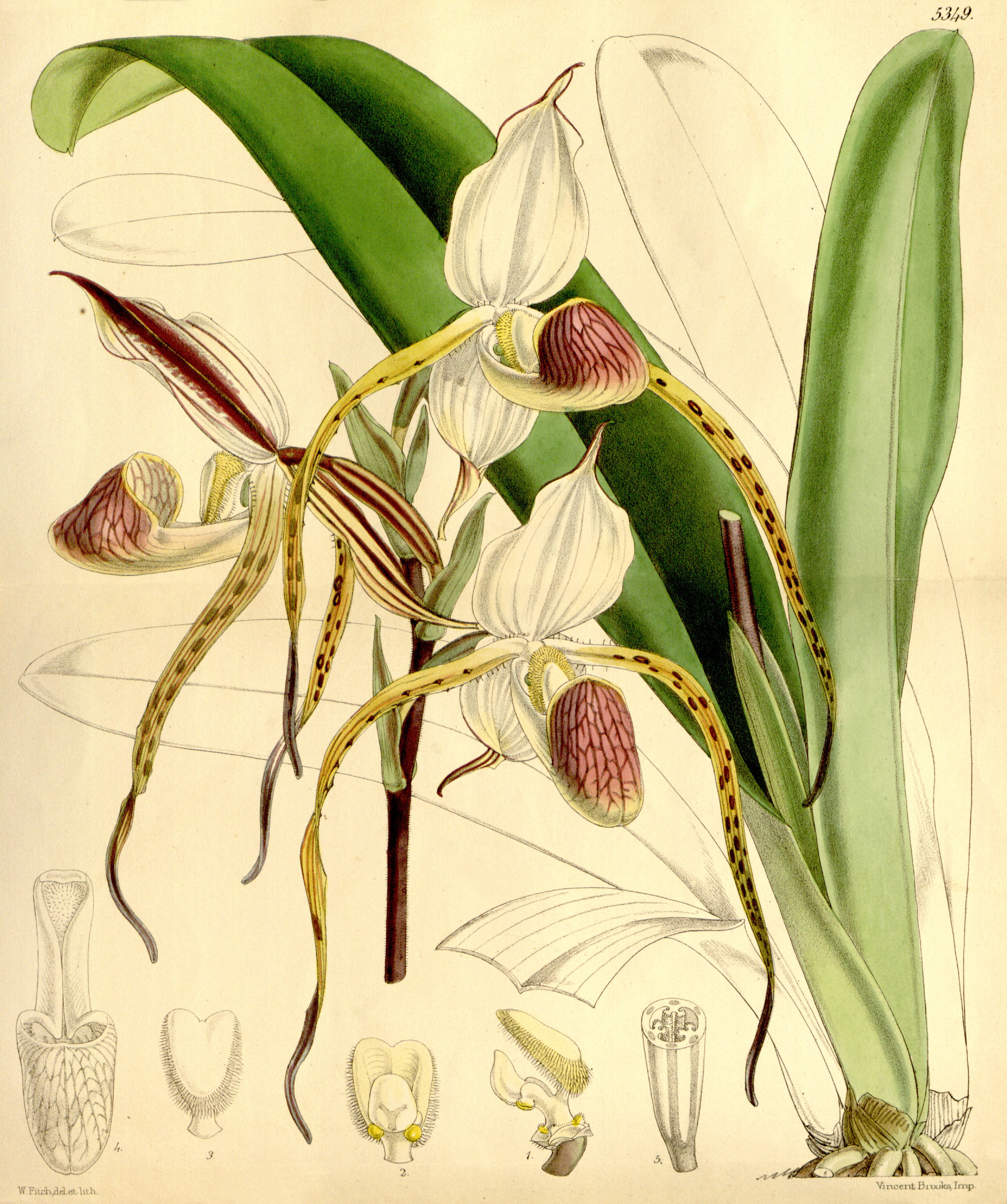
- Botanical illustration by Walter Hood Fitch, 1862

Conservation status
- Critically Endangered (IUCN 3.1)

Scientific classification
- Kingdom: Plantae
- Clade: Tracheophytes
- Clade: Angiosperms
- Clade: Monocots
- Order: Asparagales
- Family: Orchidaceae
- Subfamily: Cypripedioideae
- Genus: Paphiopedilum
- Species: P. stonei

Binomial name
- Paphiopedilum stonei (Hook.) Stein

Synonyms
- Cypripedium stonei Hook. (basionym); Cypripedium platytaenium Rchb.f.; Cordula stonei (Hook.) Rolfe

= Paphiopedilum stonei =

Species of orchid

Paphiopedilum stonei is a species of orchid, native to Borneo.

== Distribution and habitat ==
Paphiopedilum stonei is endemic to Borneo, where it is confined to Sarawak. Its habitat is on limestone cliff slopes at elevations of 60–700 m (200–2,300 ft).

== Conservation ==
Paphiopedilum stonei has been assessed as critically endangered on the IUCN Red List. Its distribution is limited to a few disjoint subpopulations in Sarawak. It is threatened by unsustainable collection as an ornamental plant and by destruction of its habitat due to logging and land conversion for agriculture.
