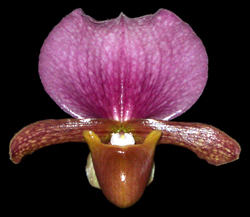

Conservation status
- Endangered (IUCN 3.1)

Scientific classification
- Kingdom: Plantae
- Clade: Tracheophytes
- Clade: Angiosperms
- Clade: Monocots
- Order: Asparagales
- Family: Orchidaceae
- Subfamily: Cypripedioideae
- Genus: Paphiopedilum
- Species: P. charlesworthii

Binomial name
- Paphiopedilum charlesworthii (Rolfe) Pfitzer

Synonyms
- Cypripedium charlesworthii Rolfe (basionym); Cordula charlesworthii (Rolfe) Rolfe; Cypripedium crawshayae O'Brien; Paphiopedilum charlesworthii f. sandowiae Braem; Paphiopedilum charlesworthii f. crawshayae (O'Brien) O.Gruss

= Paphiopedilum charlesworthii =

Species of orchid

Paphiopedilum charlesworthii or the Charlesworth paphiopedilum is a species of plant in the family Orchidaceae available in eastern Burma, Thailand, China, and Assam. Numerous hybrids are successfully cultivated.

== Taxonomy ==
P. charlesworthii was originally described by Rolfe in 1893 as a Cypripedium species, through a sample taken by R. Moore in Burma, with the epithet derived from an English cultivator, J. Charlesworth, who introduced the species to Europe. It was then reclassified as a Paphiopedilum species the following year by Pfitzer.

== Description ==
P. charlesworthii is a medium-sized, epiphitic or semi-terrestrial evergreen orchid. It consists of 4 to 6 leaves up to 15 centimetres (5.9 in) long and 3 centimetres (1.2 in) wide, with its upper side being green, and the underside is pale green, purple spots at the base. Its inflorescence grows within 8–15 centimetres (3.1–5.9 in) in length, and is colored pale green with maroon spots, and shortly pubescent. The inflorescence consists of a single flower blooming up to 9 centimetres (3.5 in) wide, with lime-green, brown-veined pouch and petals, and white, pink-patterned dorsal sepals, with peak flowering occurs in September and October. A natural albino form is available, fma. sandowiae.

== Distribution and habitat ==
P. charlesworthii is mainly distributed to the Shan States of northern Burma, in addition to adjacent bordering areas of northern Thailand, and Yunnan, China. It grows in humus and vegetative debris on limestone rock in elevations of 1,200–1,600 metres (3,900–5,200 ft), with mean temperature range of 12–22 °C (54–72 °F). It is also discovered in Assam, India.
