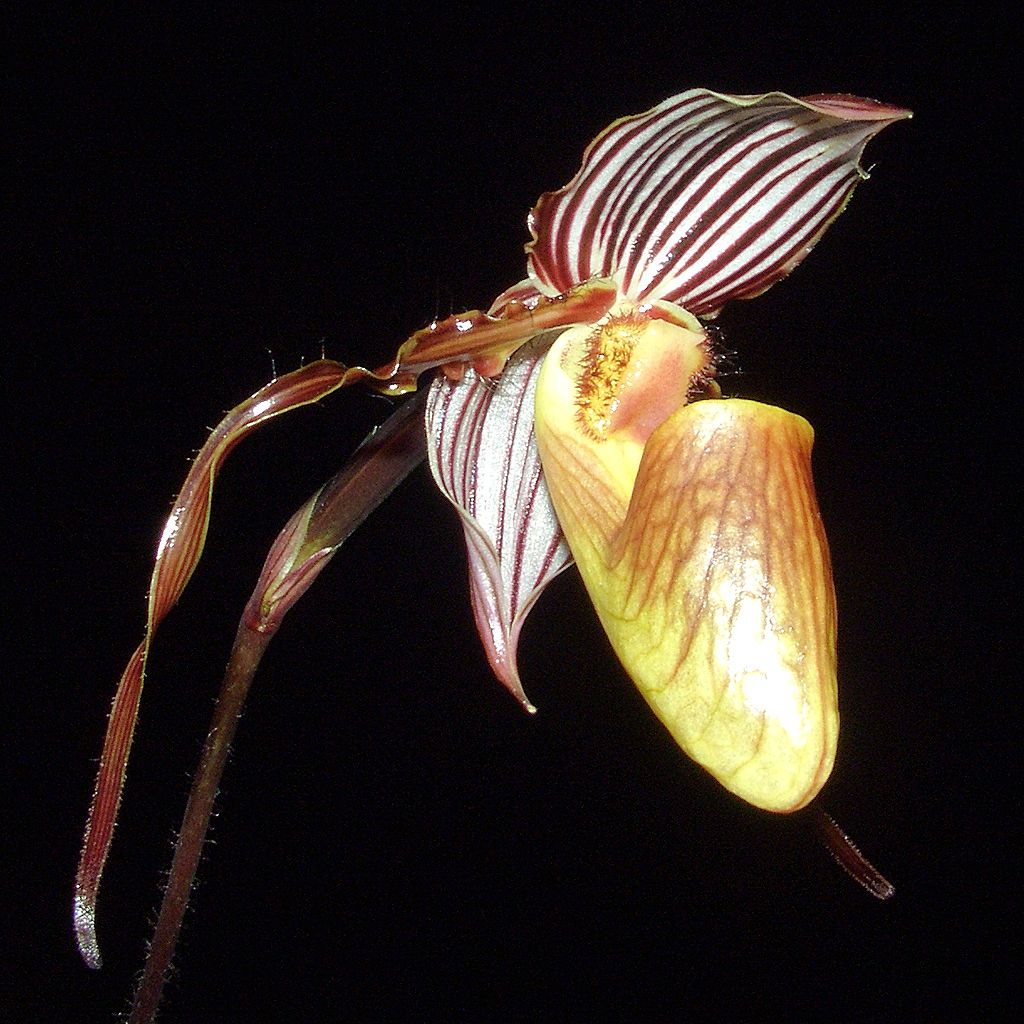
- Flower of Paphiopedilum glanduliferum

Scientific classification
- Kingdom: Plantae
- Clade: Tracheophytes
- Clade: Angiosperms
- Clade: Monocots
- Order: Asparagales
- Family: Orchidaceae
- Subfamily: Cypripedioideae
- Genus: Paphiopedilum
- Species: P. glanduliferum

Binomial name
- Paphiopedilum glanduliferum (Blume) Stein

Synonyms
- Cypripedium glanduliferum Blume (basionym); Cordula glandulifera (Blume) Rolfe; Cypripedium gardineri Guillemard; Cypripedium praestans Rchb.f.; Cypripedium praestans var. kimballianum Linden & Rodigas; Paphiopedilum gardineri (Guillemard) Pfitzer; Paphiopedilum praestans (Rchb.f.) Pfitzer; Cordula praestans (Rchb.f.) Rolfe; Paphiopedilum glanduliferum var. gardineri (Guillemard) Braem; Paphiopedilum glanduliferum var. praestans (Rchb.f.) Braem; Paphiopedilum glanduliferum var. kimballianum (Linden & Rodigas) Fowlie

= Paphiopedilum glanduliferum =

Species of orchid

Paphiopedilum glanduliferum is a species of orchid endemic to northwestern New Guinea (Irian Jaya Coast, Northwestern New Guinea and Indonesia).
