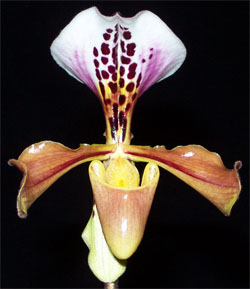

Conservation status
- Critically Endangered (IUCN 3.1)

Scientific classification
- Kingdom: Plantae
- Clade: Tracheophytes
- Clade: Angiosperms
- Clade: Monocots
- Order: Asparagales
- Family: Orchidaceae
- Subfamily: Cypripedioideae
- Genus: Paphiopedilum
- Species: P. gratrixianum

Binomial name
- Paphiopedilum gratrixianum (Masters) Rolfe

Synonyms
- Cypripedium gratrixianum Mast. (basionym); Cypripedium gratrixianum B.S.Williams; Cordula gratrixiana (Rolfe) Rolfe; Paphiopedilum villosum var. gratrixianum (Rolfe) Braem

= Paphiopedilum gratrixianum =

Species of orchid

Paphiopedilum gratrixianum is a species of plant in the family Orchidaceae found from Laos to Vietnam.
