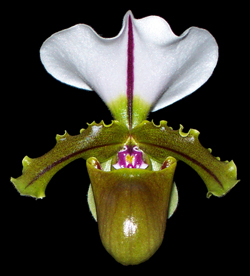

Conservation status
- Endangered (IUCN 3.1)

Scientific classification
- Kingdom: Plantae
- Clade: Tracheophytes
- Clade: Angiosperms
- Clade: Monocots
- Order: Asparagales
- Family: Orchidaceae
- Subfamily: Cypripedioideae
- Genus: Paphiopedilum
- Species: P. spicerianum

Binomial name
- Paphiopedilum spicerianum (Rchb.f) Pfitzer 1888

Synonyms
- Paphiopedilum spicerianum f. immaculatum; Cypripedium spicerianum Rchb.f. (basionym); Cordula spiceriana (Rchb.f.) Rolfe

= Paphiopedilum spicerianum =

Species of orchid

Paphiopedilum spicerianum is a species of flowering plant in the family Orchidaceae. It is said to be endemic to Assam (India) but might actually be rather widespread, though nowhere common, between Bhutan and northwestern Myanmar.
