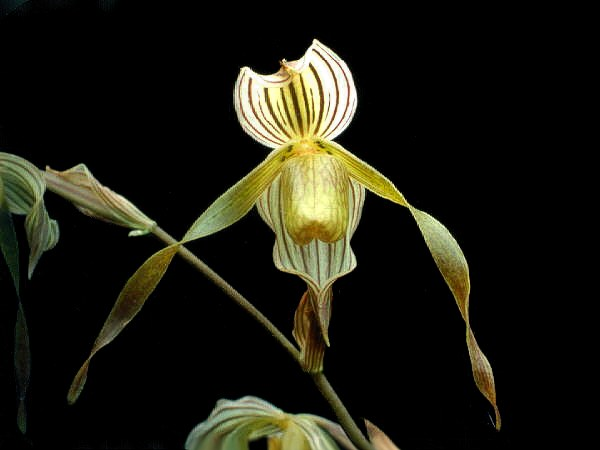
- Flower of Paphiopedilum kolopakingii

Scientific classification
- Kingdom: Plantae
- Clade: Embryophytes
- Clade: Tracheophytes
- Clade: Angiosperms
- Clade: Monocots
- Order: Asparagales
- Family: Orchidaceae
- Subfamily: Cypripedioideae
- Genus: Paphiopedilum
- Species: P. kolopakingii

Binomial name
- Paphiopedilum kolopakingii Fowlie

Synonyms
- Paphiopedilum topperi Braem & H.Mohr

= Paphiopedilum kolopakingii =

Species of orchid

Paphiopedilum kolopakingii is a species of orchid endemic to Borneo. The species is named after A. Kolopaking, an orchid collector from East Java who first flowered the plants in cultivation. This orchid is considered as high-valued economically.

== Description ==
P. kolopakingii is characterized with 8–10 strap-shaped, obtuse and clear green leaves blooming in the spring stout, with 6–14 flowers 40–70 centimetres (16–28 in) long, which are densely pubescent, purple, terete inflorescence with elliptic-lanceolate, acuminate, purple striped floral bracts, having honeysuckle-scented flowers. This orchid has the most flowers open at once among the Paphiopedilum species. Its sepals are whitish with dark red-brown or dark brown venation, while its petals are green, veined with red or brown. The lip is olive-green to ochre with darker veins. Flowering in the wild occurs from January till March. It is similar morphologically to P. ooii, but P. ooii can be distinguished by its shorter and ovate dorsal sepal, spirally twisted petals, a shorter lip and a white staminode with a less hairy margin.

The orchid grows on steep slopes in hill and lower montane forests, clustered among rocks over steep river gorges at altitudes of 600–1,100 metres (2,000–3,600 ft).

== Distribution ==
This species is endemic in Borneo, primarily in north-central Kalimantan in Indonesia, especially around the headwaters of the Barito River, although it has also been discovered in Sabah, specifically at the eastern side of Mount Kinabalu.

== Hybrids ==
The first P. kolopakingii hybrid was cultivated in 1994, with cultivated hybrids including rothschildianum × kolopakingii, kolopakingii × philippinense, kolopakingii × sanderianum, and haynaldianum × kolopakingii.
