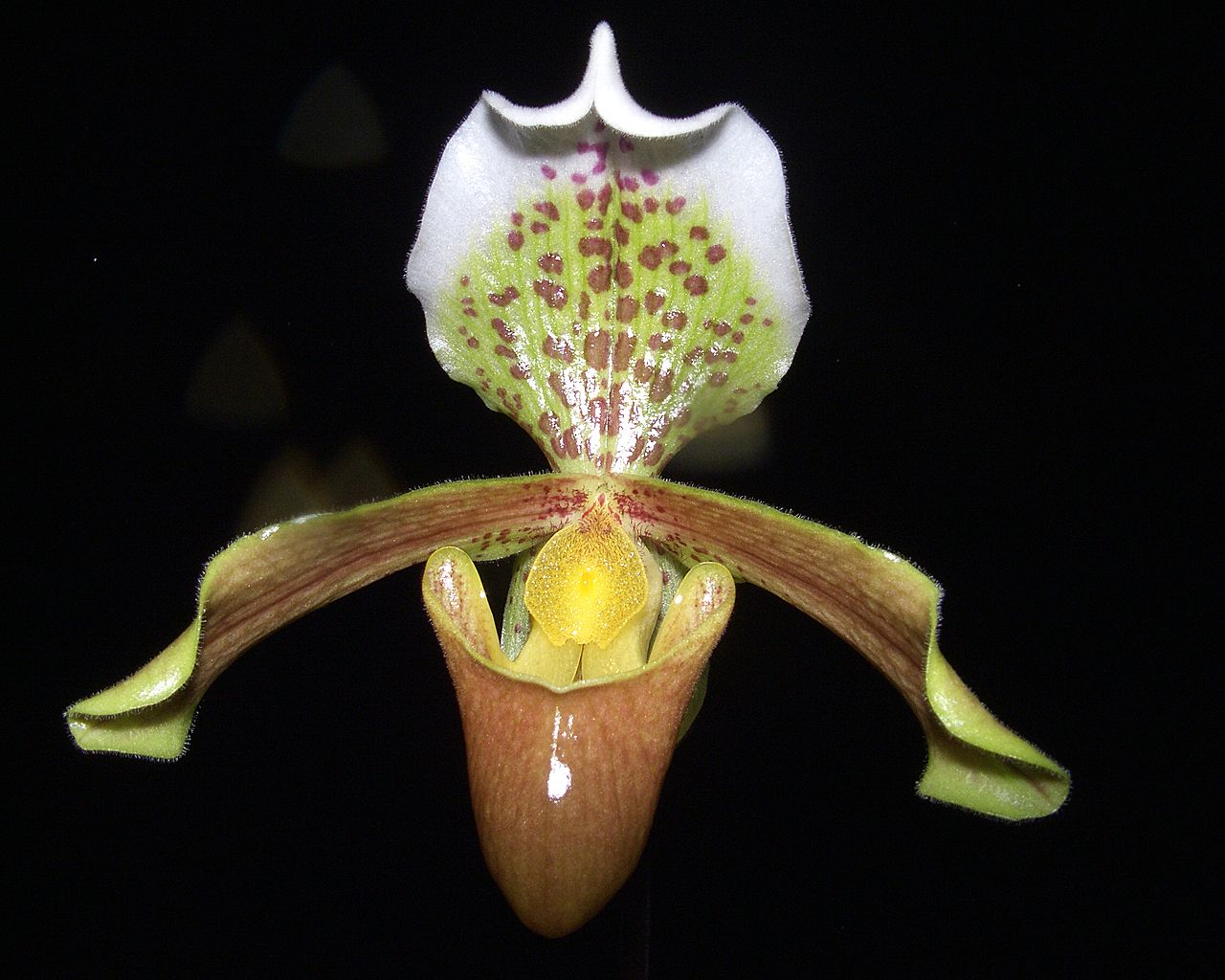
- Flower of Paphiopedilum insigne

Scientific classification
- Kingdom: Plantae
- Clade: Tracheophytes
- Clade: Angiosperms
- Clade: Monocots
- Order: Asparagales
- Family: Orchidaceae
- Subfamily: Cypripedioideae
- Genus: Paphiopedilum
- Species: P. insigne

Binomial name
- Paphiopedilum insigne (Wall. ex Lindl.) Pfitzer

Synonyms
- Cypripedium insigne Wall. ex Lindl. (basionym); Cordula insignis (Wall. ex Lindl.) Raf.; Cypripedium insigne var. sanderae Rchb.f.; Cypripedium insigne var. sanderianum Rolfe; Paphiopedilum macfarlanei F.G.Mey.; Paphiopedilum insigne f. sanderae (Rchb.f.) O.Gruss & Roeth; Paphiopedilum insigne f. sanderianum (Rolfe) O.Gruss & Roeth

= Paphiopedilum insigne =

Species of orchid

Paphiopedilum insigne is an Asian species of slipper orchid and the type species of the genus Paphiopedilum. Its name is derived from the Latin insigne, meaning 'badge of honor' due to the magnificent flower. In the 19th century it was very popular among European and American orchid growers, causing it to become very rare in the wild due to over collecting. There are many varieties of it and hybrids with it.

== Description ==
Terrestrial herb. Leaves 5–6, up to 32 cm long, 2.5–3 cm wide, leathery, ligulate, blade light green, underside purple spotted at base. Scape, erect, up to 25 cm long, terminating in a solitary flower, green, shortly purple-pubescent; elliptic or oblong-elliptic bract, obtuse, up to 5 cm long, glabrous, purple spotted at base. Flowers 7–12 cm wide; variable in colour; dorsal sepal with white apical portion with raised purple spots on inner margin, base pale green with brown spots; petals linear-oblong, margin wavy, glabrous, yellow-brown. Lip helmet shaped, yellow or yellowish-green with purple-brown shade, staminode yellow. Fl. & Fr. : October–December.

== Distribution ==
This species is native to the Khasi hills in the Indian states of Assam and Meghalaya, and the adjoining Sylhet region of Bangladesh. It is also reported from northwest Yunnan in China. It was originally described based a specimen from Sylhet, but because there have been no further reports of this species from this region, it could be extinct there due to over collection and habitat destruction. Reports from Thailand and Myanmar are uncertain or erroneous and if ever present there this species is likely extinct there.

== Habitat ==
It grows in humus and debris in crevices and among grasses and shrubs on steep open dolomitic limestone rock slopes and cliffs above streams, rivers and waterfalls at an altitude of 1000–1600 meters. Unique pictures of the plant in its natural habitat can be viewed here.

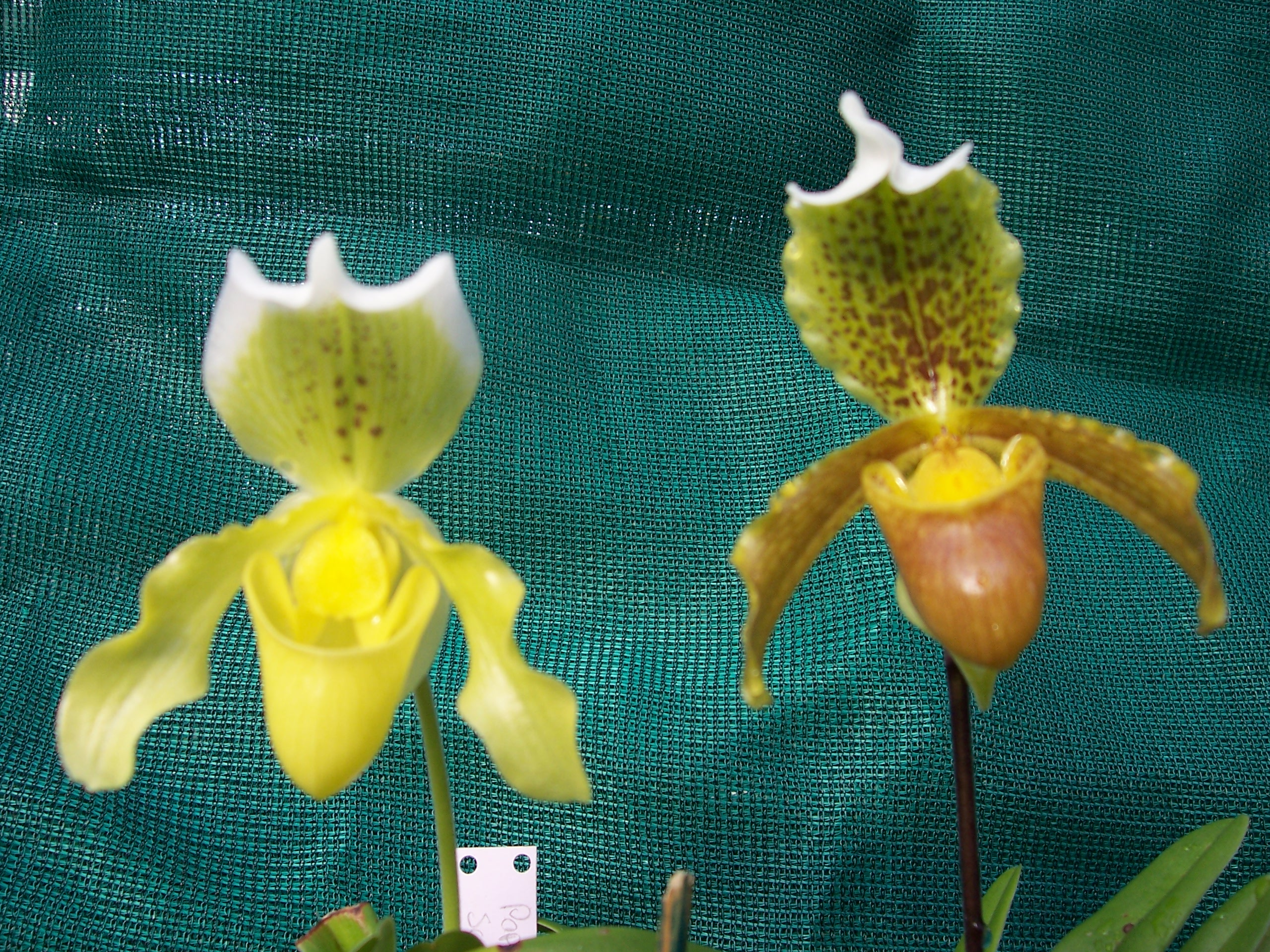

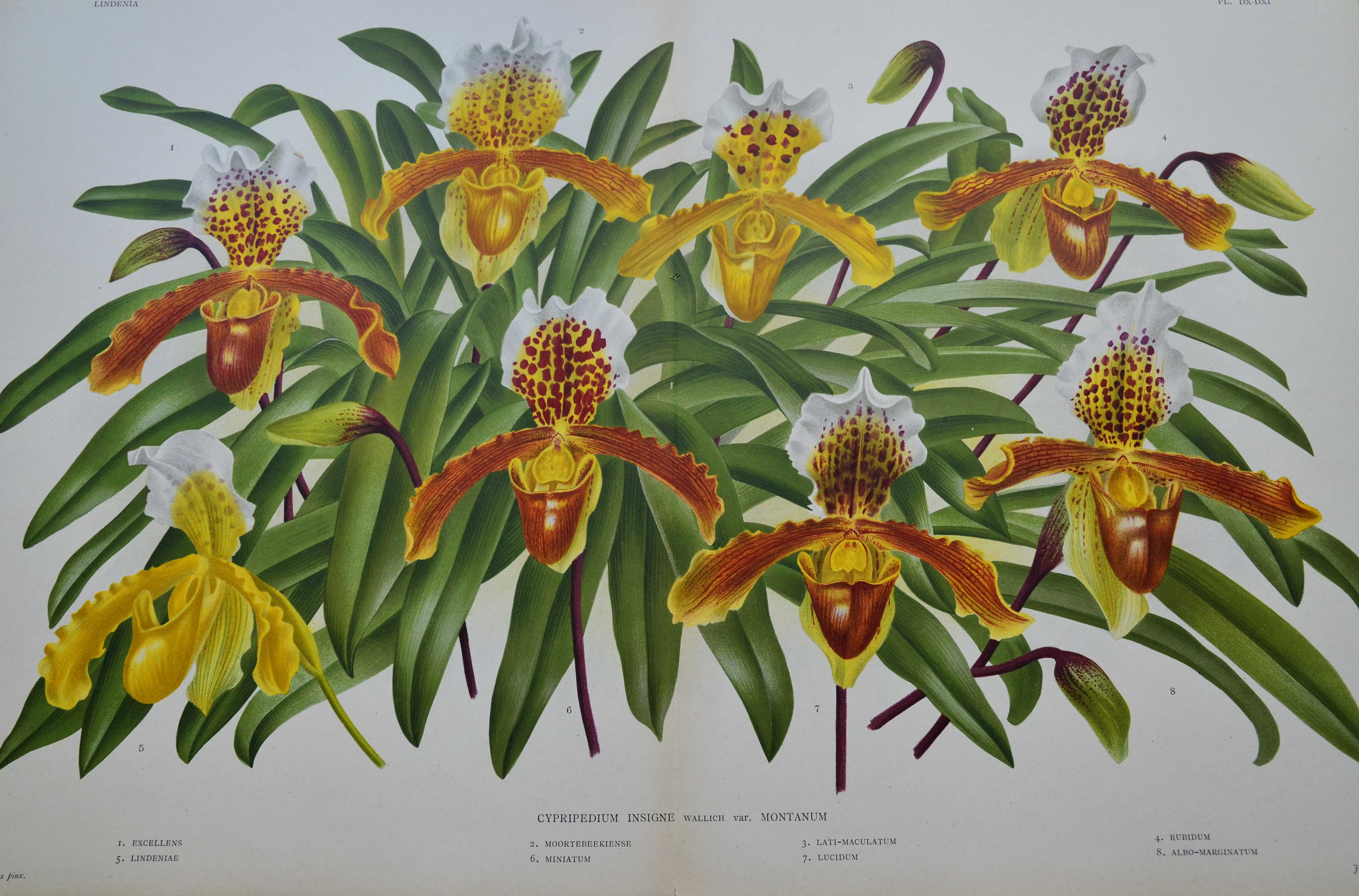

== Varieties ==
Many varieties are given in 19th and early 20th century literature, but not all were formally described and most are synonyms. The type variety is mooreana, which is shown in the photo together with variety sanderae, the semi-alba color form. The painting shows the diverse forms of the variety montanum, which isn't really a variety but rather a product name that 19th century European importers used to describe a series of varieties and forms with narrower leaves and richly marked flowers that were harvested from a different mountain region than the ones imported before. Nathaniel Wallich sent the first living insigne plants to the UK from the Sylhet region. Later William Griffith discovered it in the Khasi Hills in Meghalaya. The variety sanderae came out of an importation of montanum by Frederick Sander. It was sold in 1890 at £250, the equivalent of about £35,000 in 2021.

== Conservation status ==
Due to ruthless collection for international trade in the 19th and 20th century, current poaching for regional trade, and destruction of its habitat, the species has become very rare.
