= Paphiopedilum ooii =

Conservation status
- Critically Endangered (IUCN 3.1)

Scientific classification
- Kingdom: Plantae
- Clade: Tracheophytes
- Clade: Angiosperms
- Clade: Monocots
- Order: Asparagales
- Family: Orchidaceae
- Subfamily: Cypripedioideae
- Genus: Paphiopedilum
- Species: P. ooii

Binomial name
- Paphiopedilum ooii Koop. (1999)

Species of orchid

Paphiopedilum ooii is a species of slipper orchid native to Mount Kinabalu on Borneo. It is named after Michael Ooi, a slipper orchid enthusiast from Malaysia.

== Description ==
P. ooii is known as an obligate ultramafic species. Its flowers are 3 centimetres (1.2 in) wide, large sized, with warm to cool growing, and grows on terrestrial or lithophyte on rocks with 6–8 leaves that are characterised as suberect, oblong-lanceolate, rounded, and dark green in color. The species blooms in 4 to 12 flowered inflorescence in the winter characterized as terminal, erect, and arcuate, with length spanning to 1.5 metres (4.9 ft). It is similar morphologically to P. kolopakingii, but can be distinguished by its shorter and ovate dorsal sepal, spirally twisted petals, a shorter lip and a white staminode with a less hairy margin.

== Distribution and habitat ==
Paphiopedilum ooii is found in a single location on Mount Kinabalu on the island of Borneo, in Sabah state of Malaysia. It is often a lithophyte growing on rocks, cracks and crevices in cliffs near rivers and slopes of eroded serpentine, within altitudes of 600–1,100 metres (2,000–3,600 ft) and 1,500–1,600 metres (4,900–5,200 ft) above sea level.

== Conservation ==
The known population is very small, existing only in a single location in Kinabalu Park, estimated at 40 individuals. It is threatened with habitat loss from human activities and from commercial collecting. Its population is declining, and its conservation status is assessed as Critically Endangered. By 2015, the single population was recorded to be disappeared due to illegal poaching.
