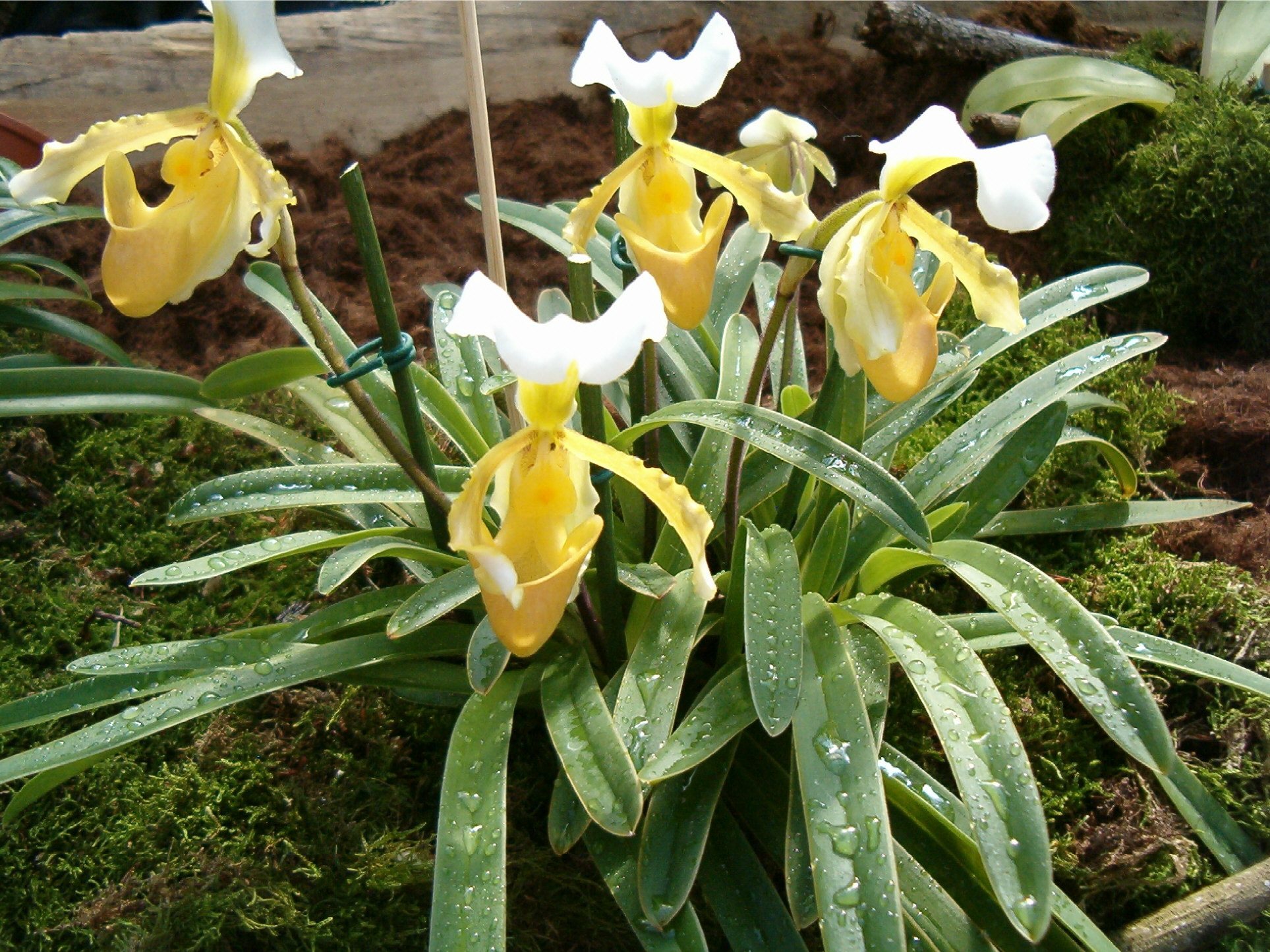

Conservation status
- Endangered (IUCN 3.1)

Scientific classification
- Kingdom: Plantae
- Clade: Tracheophytes
- Clade: Angiosperms
- Clade: Monocots
- Order: Asparagales
- Family: Orchidaceae
- Subfamily: Cypripedioideae
- Genus: Paphiopedilum
- Species: P. barbigerum

Binomial name
- Paphiopedilum barbigerum Tang & Wang (1940)

Synonyms
- Paphiopedilum insigne var. barbigerum (Tang & Wang) Braem

= Paphiopedilum barbigerum =

Species of orchid

Paphiopedilum barbigerum is a species of slipper orchid in the family Orchidaceae known commonly as the beard carrying paphiopedilum. It is native to China, Vietnam, and Thailand. Several cultivated hybrids are available with P. barbigerum. It is an endangered species due to habitat destruction and overcollection for horticultural trade.

== Taxonomy ==
P. barbigerum was originally described by Tang and Wang in 1940, based on samples from Guizhou, China. The epithet is derived from Latin barba ("beard"), referring to the tuft of hairs at the base of its petals.

== Description ==
This orchid grows in soil, on rocks, or on tree trunks in limestone habitat types. It produces 4 to 6 linear, solid green leaves of 8–20 centimetres (3.1–7.9 in) long and 0.5–2 centimetres (0.20–0.79 in) wide. Its light green, shortly pubescent inflorescence measuring up to 16 centimetres (6.3 in) blooms a single flower of up to 6.5 centimetres (2.6 in) wide on a hairy brownish stalk, with peak flowering occurs from October to December. The dorsal sepal is white with a greenish or brownish spot at the base. The synsepal is pale green and the petals are brownish with pale edges. The staminode is yellow. A natural albino form is available, P. barbigerum fma. aureum.

This species is pollinated by hoverflies, in particular Allograpta javana and Episyrphus balteatus.

== Distribution ==
P. barbigerum grows in southern China, specifically around the upstream of the Xi River within the Guizhou, Yunnan, and Guangxi areas, together with northern Vietnam, where it grows in elevations of 300–1,200 metres (980–3,940 ft) with mean temperatures of 11–28 °C (52–82 °F).

The Vietnamese population is known as a variant, P. barbigerum var. lockianum, originally described in 2002. The Thai population, described in 2022, is known as Paphiopedilum barbigerum var. lannaense.
