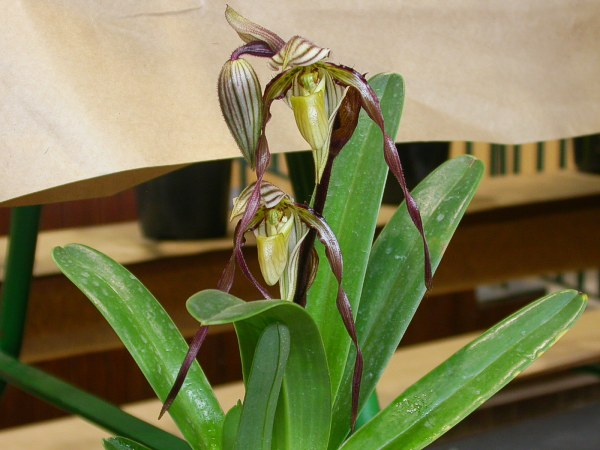

Conservation status
- Near Threatened (IUCN 3.1)

Scientific classification
- Kingdom: Plantae
- Clade: Tracheophytes
- Clade: Angiosperms
- Clade: Monocots
- Order: Asparagales
- Family: Orchidaceae
- Subfamily: Cypripedioideae
- Genus: Paphiopedilum
- Species: P. philippinense

Binomial name
- Paphiopedilum philippinense (Rchb.f.) Stein

Synonyms
- Cypripedium philippinense Rchb.f. (basionym); Cypripedium laevigatum Bateman; Selenipedium laevigatum (Bateman) May; Cypripedium cannartianum Linden; Paphiopedilum laevigatum (Bateman) Pfitzer; Paphiopedilum philippinense f. album Valmayor & D.Tiu; Cordula philippinensis (Rchb.f.) Rolfe; Paphiopedilum philippinense f. alboflavum O.Gruss; Paphiopedilum roebelenii f. alboflavum (O.Gruss) Braem & Chiron

= Paphiopedilum philippinense =

Species of orchid

Paphiopedilum philippinense is a species of orchid occurring from the Philippines to northern Borneo.
