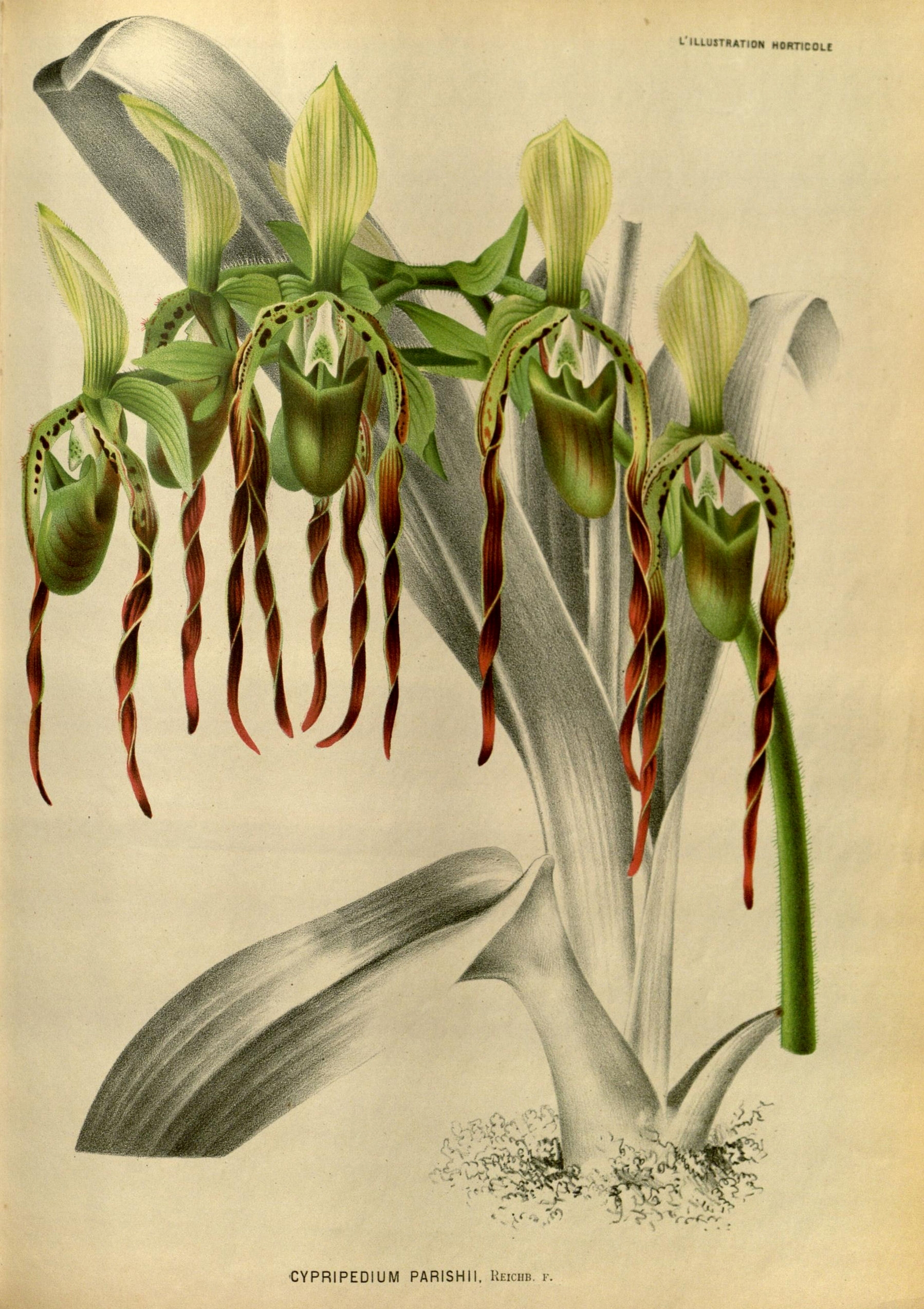
- Illustration from 1875 under the synonym Cypripedium parishii

Conservation status
- Endangered (IUCN 3.1)
- CITES Appendix I (CITES)

Scientific classification
- Kingdom: Plantae
- Clade: Tracheophytes
- Clade: Angiosperms
- Clade: Monocots
- Order: Asparagales
- Family: Orchidaceae
- Subfamily: Cypripedioideae
- Genus: Paphiopedilum
- Species: P. parishii

Binomial name
- Paphiopedilum parishii (Rchb.f.) Stein 1892

Synonyms
- Cypripedium parishii Rchb.f.; Selenipedium parishii (Rchb.f.) André; Cordula parishii (Rchb.f.) Rolfe

= Paphiopedilum parishii =

Species of flowering plant in the orchid family

Paphiopedilum parishii is a species of orchid found in northern and western Thailand, Laos, Myanmar, Yunnan and Assam, in montane forests at 1200–2200 m above sea level. It is named after Charles Samuel Pollock Parish, an English botanist and avid plant collector who had a particular interest in the flora of Myanmar (then Burma).

Plants in this species are described as being epiphytes or lithophytes. They grow in thick moss which occurs on boulders or on the tree branches of Terminalia in humid and shady broad-leaved forests, making them facultative lithophytes.

Paphiopedilum parishii is placed in section Pardalopetalum based on its chromosome count, multifloral inflorescence, distribution and leopard spots on the petals.

== Description ==
The 5–8 leaves are clear green, lingulate, up to 45 by 4.5–7 cm and thick. The 2–7 flowers are 7.5 cm (3.0 in) across and open simultaneously on an inflorescence 50–70 cm (20–28 in) long. The species has spoon-shaped tips on the long, twisted petals. The petals taper from base to apex.

== Reproduction ==
Paphiopedilum parishii is unique in that it evolved a specialised self-pollination mechanism as a possible adaptation to the insect-scarce habitat. The pollen grains and anther liquify and move from the apex of the filament to the stigma. The main pollinator is Allograpta robinsoni, a hoverfly.

== Alternative medicine ==
The plant is used in traditional Chinese medicine for detoxification and to dispel heat, as a mild tranquiliser, to treat febrile rash, pneumonia and depression.
