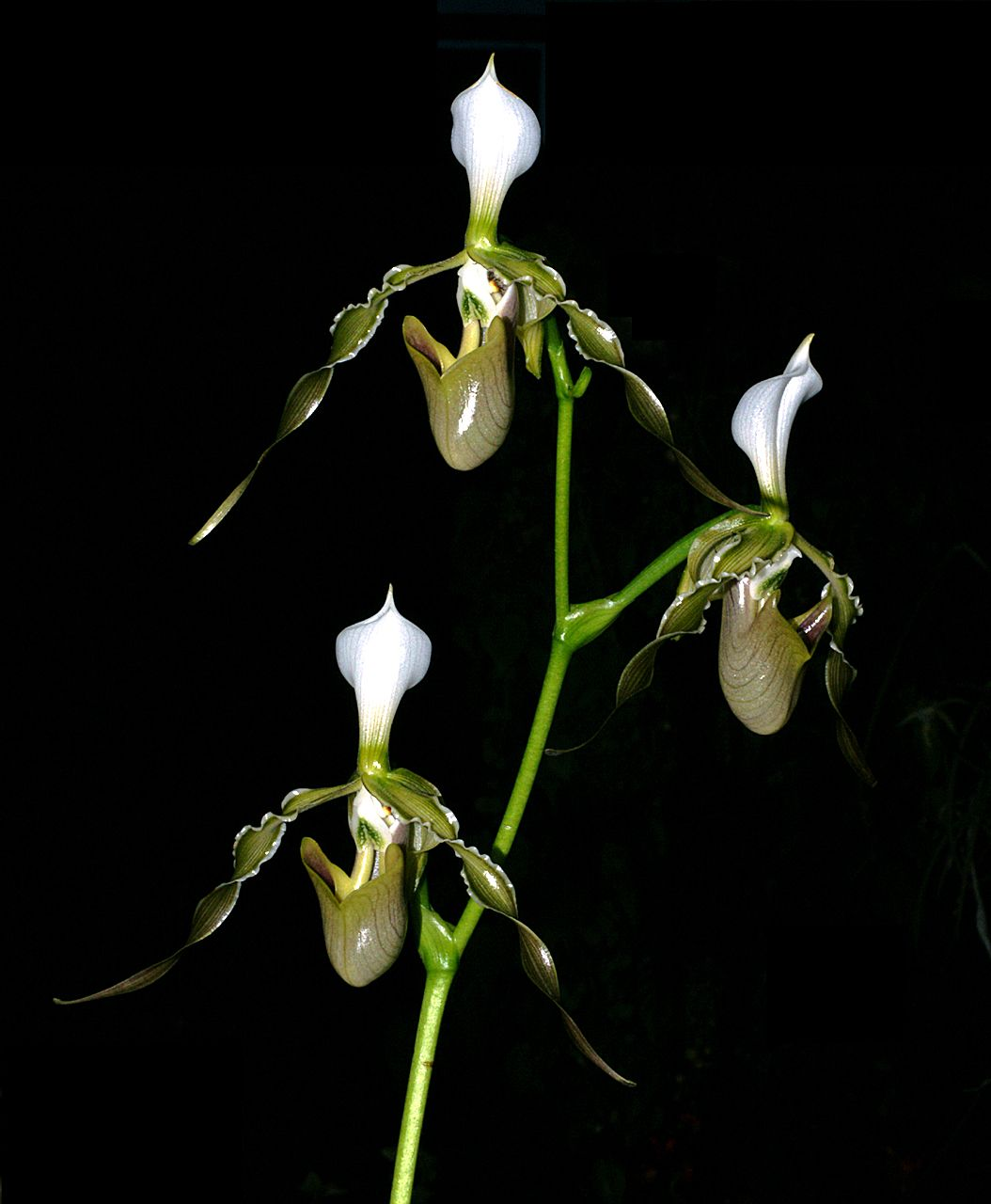

Conservation status
- Endangered (IUCN 3.1)

Scientific classification
- Kingdom: Plantae
- Clade: Tracheophytes
- Clade: Angiosperms
- Clade: Monocots
- Order: Asparagales
- Family: Orchidaceae
- Subfamily: Cypripedioideae
- Genus: Paphiopedilum
- Species: P. dianthum

Binomial name
- Paphiopedilum dianthum Tang & F.T.Wang

Synonyms
- Paphiopedilum parishii var. dianthum (Tang & F.T.Wang) K.Karas. & K.Saito; Paphiopedilum dianthum f. album O.Gruss

= Paphiopedilum dianthum =

Species of orchid

Paphiopedilum dianthum is a species of flowering plant in the orchid family, Orchidaceae. It is native to China, Laos, and Vietnam. It is known commonly as the double flowered paphiopedilum.

This species grows on limestone in forest habitat. It produces 4 to 6 green leathery leaves. It bears 1 to 5 flowers at the top of an erect or arching stalk up to 80 centimeters long. The flower is up to 10 centimeters wide. The dorsal sepal is white with green veining and the synsepal is greenish to yellow-green with green veining. The striped greenish or brownish lateral petals are long and twisted with hairy warts. The lip is helmet-shaped.

The petal warts and helmet-shaped lip petal are likely attractive to a main pollinator of the species, the hoverfly Episyrphus balteatus.

This rare plant has a restricted, fragmented population. It is poached from the wild for use in the horticultural trade, and its habitat is threatened with destruction and degradation.
