= Berthold Stein =

Polish botanist (1847–1899)

- Born: 23 March 1847; Breslau, Province of Silesia, Prussia
- Died: 27 February 1899 (aged 51); Breslau, Province of Silesia, German Empire
- Occupations: Lichenologist and botanist

Berthold Stein (1847–1899) was a Prussian botanist and lichenologist. After working as a disciple (Note: References state this position as "Garteneleve", a German word which has apparently gone out of fashion. At least one source explicitly states that "eleve" doesn't translate as "Assistent". The website dict.cc translates it as "student" or "disciple") at the Botanical Garden in Berlin in 1865 he became superintendent (Note: References in German state this position as "Inspektor") at the Innsbruck Botanical Garden. He held this position from 1873 to 1880, during which he also started to collect lichens. From 1880 to 1890 he was royal superintendent at the University of Wrocław Botanical Garden. Based on a quote in 1879 by Stein himself he can be considered as a student of Gustav Körber. His main area of interest was the flora of Silesia.

He worked extensively on the taxonomy of the genera Masdevallia, Pescatoria (as Pescatorea) and Paphiopedilum in the orchid family.

== Publications ==
=== Books ===
- 1879. Flechten. Kryptogamen-Flora von Schlesien. Second Part. With Ferdinand Cohn. Ed. J.U. Kern, 400 pp.
- 1882. Lichenes Maderenses at Mindanaoenses. Verhandl. der Schlesischen Gesellsch. fur vaterlánd. Kultur.
- 1882. Uebersicht der gegenwärtig in den europäischen gärten cultivirten primeln.
- 1889. Ueber afrikanische Flechten
- 1890. Übersicht über die auf Dr hans meyer's drei Ostafrika-expeditionen (1887–89) gesammelten Flechten
- 1892. Stein's Orchideenbuch. Beschreibung, Abbildung und Kulturanweisung der empfehlenswertesten Arten. Mit 184 in den Text gedruckten Abbildungen.

=== Journals ===
- Drei Cerastien. Österreichische Botanische Zeitschrift. Vol. 28, No. 1 (January 1878), pp. 18–27

== Eponymous taxa ==
- Steinia Zahlbr.
- Acarospora steinii Körb.
- Gyalecta steinii E.K.Novák
- Lecidea steinii Zahlbr.
- Leptorhaphis steinii Körb.
- Populus × steiniana Bornm.
- Primula × steinii Obrist ex Stein. Likely named after the village of Steinach in Austria where this natural hybrid was found. "Im Kalkgeröll des hinteren Önnes im Gschnitsthale bei Steinnach (Central-Alpen Tirols) in 2000 M. Höhe in einem eizigen Rasen gefunden."
- The abbreviation "Stein" is used to indicate Berthold Stein as an authority on the scientific description and classification of plants.
