= Robert Allen Rolfe =

English botanist

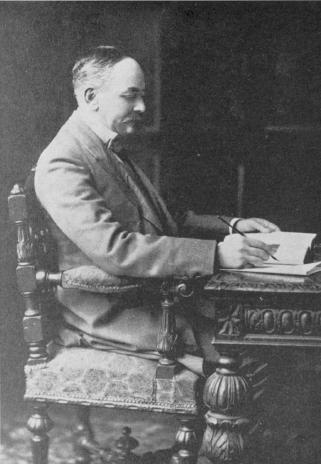

Robert Allen Rolfe (1855, Wilford, Nottinghamshire – 1921, Richmond, Surrey) was an English botanist specialising in the study of orchids. For a time he worked in the gardens at Welbeck Abbey. He entered Kew in 1879 and became second assistant. He was the first curator of the orchid herbarium at the Royal Botanic Gardens, Kew, founded the magazine The Orchid Review, and published many papers on hybrids of different species of orchids.

The genus Allenrolfea of amaranths was named after him by Carl Ernst Otto Kuntze.

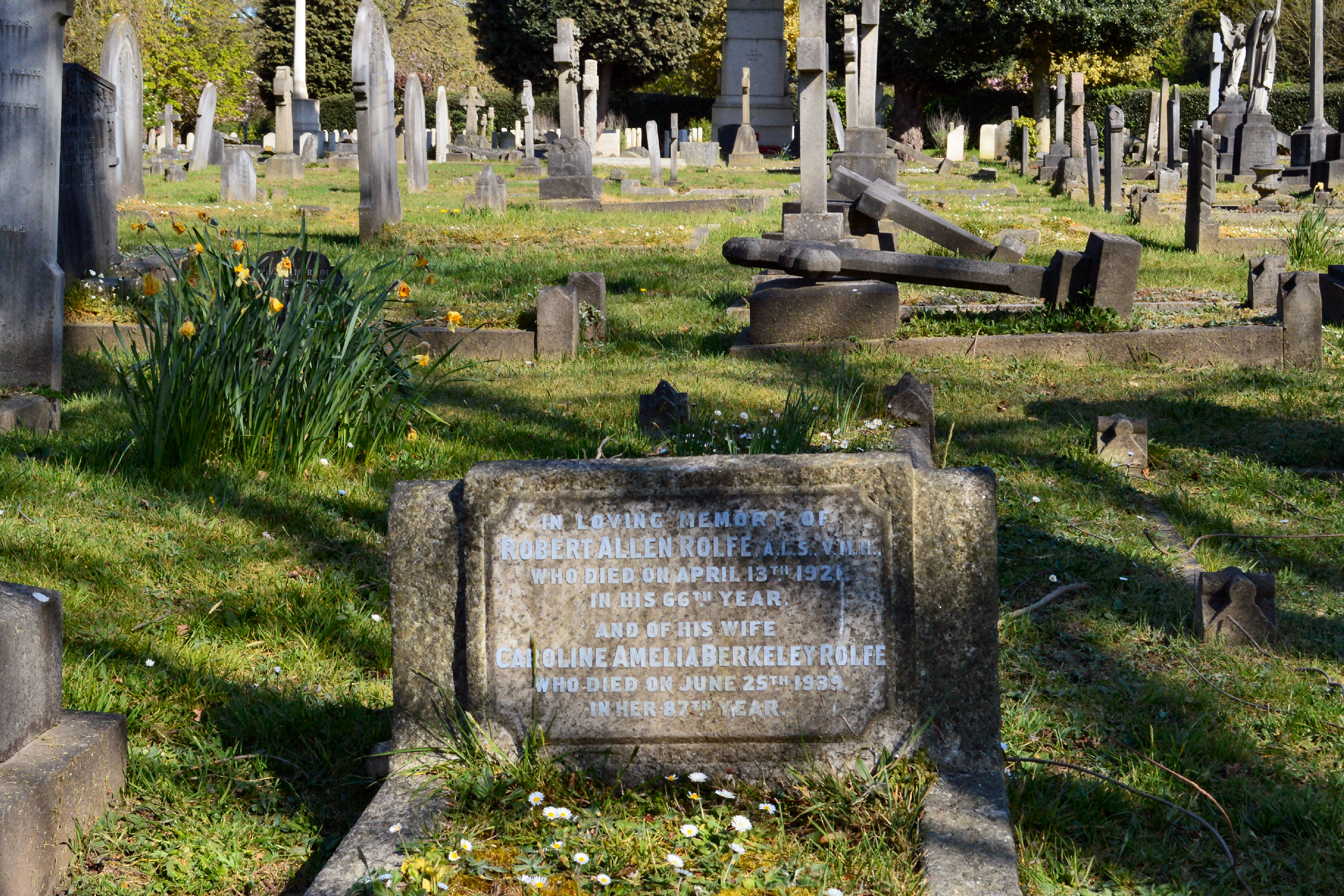
Richmond Cemetery

Rolfe was buried in Richmond Cemetery.

== Works ==
- Rolfe, Robert Allen (1883). "On the Selagineæ described by Linnæus, Bergius, Linnæus, fil., and Thunberg." Botanical Journal of the Linnean Society 20(129): 338–358.
- Rolfe, Robert Allen (1884). "On Hyalocalyx, a new Genus of Turneraceæ from Madagascar." Journal of the Linnean Society of London, Botany 21(134): 256–258.
- Rolfe, Robert Allen (1884). "On the Flora of the Philippine Islands, and its probable Derivation." Botanical Journal of the Linnean Society 21(135): 283–316.
- Rolfe, Robert Allen (1887). On Bigeneric Orchid Hybrids. Botanical Journal of the Linnean Society 24(160): 156–170.
- Rolfe, Robert Allen (1889). A Morphological and Systematic Review of the Apostasieæ. Botanical Journal of the Linnean Society, 25(171): 211–243.
- Rolfe, Robert Allen & Hurst, Charles Chamberlain (1909). The Orchid Stud-Book: An Enumeration of Hybrid Orchids of Artificial Origin, with their parents, raisers, date of first flowering, references to descriptions and figures, and synonymy. With an historical introduction and 120 figures and a chapter on hybridising and raising orchids from seed. Frank Leslie & Co.

== See also ==
- Category:Taxa named by Robert Allen Rolfe
