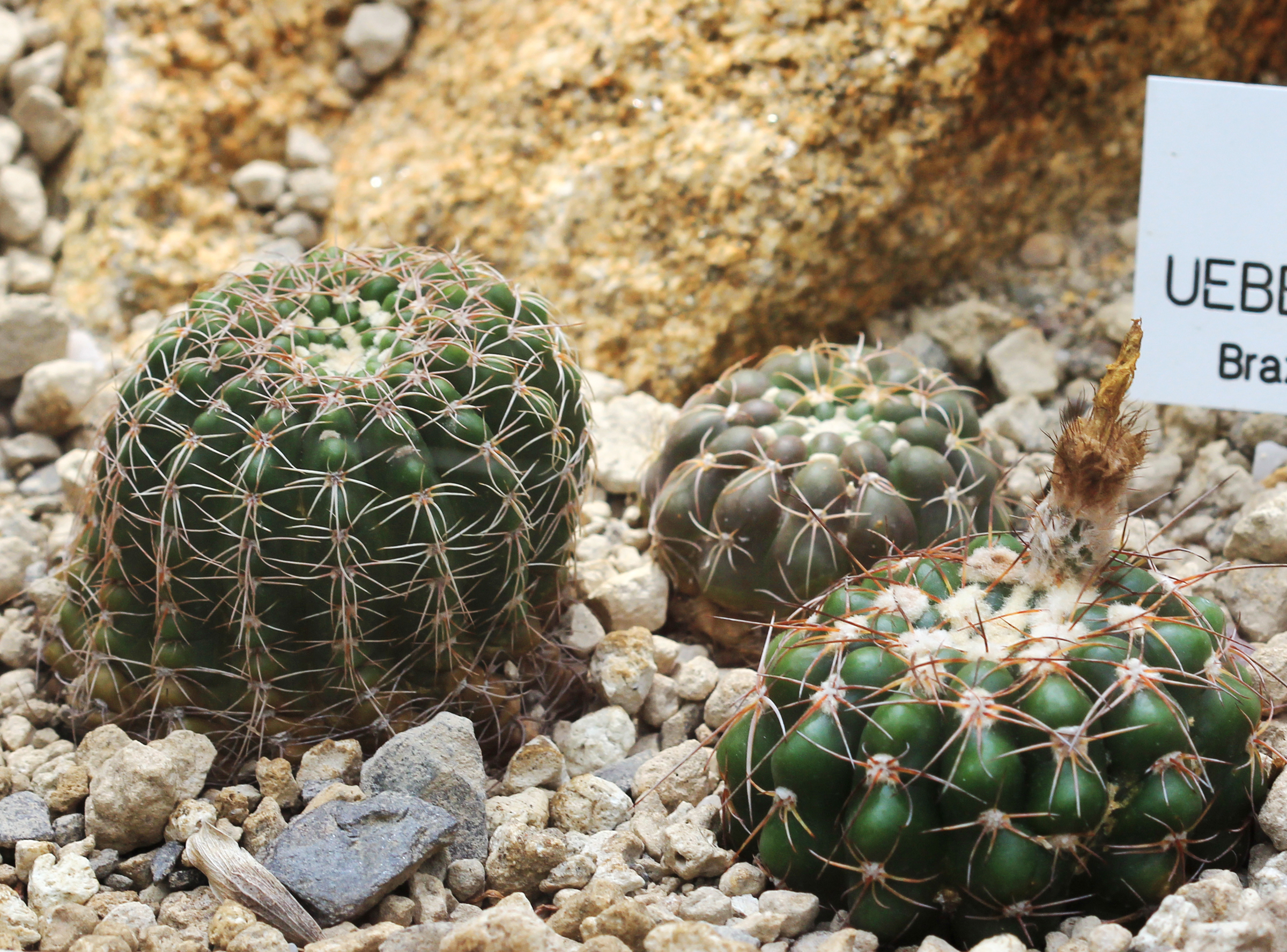
- Parodia werneri

Scientific classification
- Kingdom: Plantae
- Clade: Embryophytes
- Clade: Tracheophytes
- Clade: Spermatophytes
- Clade: Angiosperms
- Clade: Eudicots
- Order: Caryophyllales
- Family: Cactaceae
- Subfamily: Cactoideae
- Tribe: Notocacteae

Type genus
- Notocactus

Genera
- See text

= Notocacteae =

Tribe of cacti

Notocacteae is a tribe of cacti belonging to the subfamily Cactoideae. It is one of the oldest cactus lineages endemic to South America.

== Description ==
Notocacteae are mostly single, rarely tree-like or shrub-like plants. Their mostly spherical, non-articulated shoots are ribbed, ribbed-warty or warty. The small to medium-sized, polysymmetrical to disymmetrical flowers open during the day. Their pericarpel has small scales. The areoles bear bristles or hairs. The fruits that burst or do not burst are usually dry and rarely berry-like. The small to medium-sized seeds are diverse in shape. The hilum and micropyle of the seeds are fused together, a strophiole is often present, and a slimy coating is sometimes present.

== Genera ==
Image	Genus	Synonyms	Living species
	Copiapoa Britton & Rose,1922	Pilocopiapoa	33 species: Copiapoa ahremephiana N.P.Taylor & G.J.Charles; Copiapoa algarrobensis Katt.; Copiapoa angustiflora Helmut Walter, G.J.Charles & Mächler; Copiapoa aphanes Mächler & Helmut Walter; Copiapoa atacamensis Middled.; Copiapoa australis (Hoxey) Helmut Walter & Larridon; Copiapoa calderana F.Ritter; Copiapoa cinerascens (Salm-Dyck) Britton & Rose; Copiapoa coquimbana (Karw. ex Rümpler) Britton & Rose; Copiapoa corralensis I.Schaub & Keim; Copiapoa decorticans N.P.Taylor & G.J.Charles; Copiapoa desertorum F.Ritter; Copiapoa echinoides (Lem. ex Salm-Dyck) Britton & Rose; Copiapoa esmeraldana F.Ritter; Copiapoa fiedleriana (K.Schum.) Backeb.; Copiapoa fusca I.Schaub & Keim; Copiapoa gigantea Backeb.; Copiapoa grandiflora F.Ritter; Copiapoa humilis (Phil.) Hutchison; Copiapoa hypogaea F.Ritter; Copiapoa laui Diers; Copiapoa leonensis I.Schaub & Keim; Copiapoa longispina F.Ritter; Copiapoa longistaminea F.Ritter; Copiapoa marginata (Salm-Dyck) Britton & Rose; Copiapoa megarhiza Britton & Rose; Copiapoa mollicula F.Ritter; Copiapoa montana F.Ritter; Copiapoa pendulina F.Ritter; Copiapoa rupestris F.Ritter; Copiapoa schulziana I.Schaub & Keim; Copiapoa serpentisulcata F.Ritter; Copiapoa taltalensis (Werderm.) Looser
	Eriosyce Phil. 1872	Chilenia, Chileniopsis, Horridocactus, Islaya, Neochilenia, Neoporteria, Pyrrhocactus, Reicheocactus, Rodentiophila, Thelocephala	56 species: Eriosyce andreaeana Katt.; Eriosyce armata (F.Ritter) P.C.Guerrero & Helmut Walter; Eriosyce aspillagae (Söhrens) Katt.; Eriosyce atroviridis (F.Ritter) P.C.Guerrero & Helmut Walter; Eriosyce aurata (Pfeiff.) Backeb.; Eriosyce bulbocalyx (Werderm.) Katt.; Eriosyce calderana (F.Ritter) Ferryman; Eriosyce caligophila R.Pinto; Eriosyce castanea (F.Ritter) P.C.Guerrero & Helmut Walter; Eriosyce chilensis (Hildm. ex K.Schum.) Katt.; Eriosyce clavata (Söhrens ex K.Schum.) Helmut Walter; Eriosyce coimasensis (F.Ritter) P.C.Guerrero & Helmut Walter; Eriosyce crispa (F.Ritter) Katt.; Eriosyce curvispina (Bertero ex Colla) Katt.; Eriosyce duripulpa (F.Ritter) P.C.Guerrero & Helmut Walter; Eriosyce elquiensis (Katt.) P.C.Guerrero & Helmut Walter; Eriosyce engleri (F.Ritter) Katt.; Eriosyce eriosyzoides (F.Ritter) Ferryman; Eriosyce esmeraldana (F.Ritter) Katt.; Eriosyce fankhauseri (F.Ritter) P.C.Guerrero & Helmut Walter; Eriosyce fulva (F.Ritter) P.C.Guerrero & Helmut Walter; Eriosyce garaventae (F.Ritter) Katt.; Eriosyce glabrescens (F.Ritter) P.C.Guerrero & Helmut Walter; Eriosyce heinrichiana (Backeb.) Katt.; Eriosyce iquiquensis (F.Ritter) Ferryman; Eriosyce islayensis (C.F.Först.) Katt.; Eriosyce krausii (F.Ritter) Katt.; Eriosyce kunzei (C.F.Först.) Katt.; Eriosyce laui Lüthy; Eriosyce limariensis (F.Ritter) Katt.; Eriosyce litoralis (F.Ritter) P.C.Guerrero & Helmut Walter; Eriosyce malleolata (F.Ritter) P.C.Guerrero & Helmut Walter; Eriosyce marksiana (F.Ritter) Katt.; Eriosyce megliolii (Rausch) Ferryman; Eriosyce napina (Phil.) Katt.; Eriosyce nigrihorrida (Backeb.) P.C.Guerrero & Helmut Walter; Eriosyce occulta Katt.; Eriosyce odieri (Lem. ex Salm-Dyck.) Katt.; Eriosyce paucicostata (F.Ritter) Ferryman; Eriosyce recondita (F.Ritter) Katt.; Eriosyce riparia (Mächler & Helmut Walter) P.C.Guerrero & Helmut Walter; Eriosyce rodentiophila F.Ritter; Eriosyce senilis (Backeb.) Katt.; Eriosyce simulans (F.Ritter) Katt.; Eriosyce sociabilis (F.Ritter) Katt.; Eriosyce spectabilis Katt., Helmut Walter & J.C.Acosta; Eriosyce spinosior (F.Ritter) P.C.Guerrero & Helmut Walter; Eriosyce strausiana (K.Schum.) Katt.; Eriosyce subgibbosa (Haw.) Katt.; Eriosyce taltalensis (Hutchison) Katt.; Eriosyce tenebrica (F.Ritter) Katt.; Eriosyce umadeave (Fric ex Kreuz.) Katt.; Eriosyce vallenarensis (F.Ritter) Katt.; Eriosyce villicumensis (Rausch) Katt.; Eriosyce villosa (Monv.) Katt.; Eriosyce wagenknechtii (F.Ritter) Katt.
	Eulychnia Phil.		Eulychnia acida Phil.; Eulychnia breviflora Phil.; Eulychnia castanea Phil.; Eulychnia chorosensis P.Klaassen; Eulychnia elata (F.Ritter) Lodé; Eulychnia iquiquensis (K.Schum.) Britton & Rose; Eulychnia ritteri Cullmann; Eulychnia taltalensis (F.Ritter) Hoxey; Eulychnia vallenarensis P.C.Guerrero & Helmut Walter
	Neowerdermannia Fric, 1930		Neowerdermannia chilensis Backeb., 1936; Neowerdermannia vorwerkii Frič (1930)
	Parodia Speg. 1923	Brasilicactus, Brasiliparodia Echinocactus subg. Notocactus, Eriocactus, Notocactus, Wigginsia	66 species: Parodia alacriportana Backeb. & Voll; Parodia allosiphon (Marchesi) N.P.Taylor; Parodia aureicentra Backeb.; Parodia ayopayana Cárdenas; Parodia buiningii (Buxb.) N.P.Taylor; Parodia calvescens (N.Gerloff & A.D.Nilson) Anceschi & Magli; Parodia carambeiensis (Buining & Brederoo) Hofacker; Parodia chrysacanthion (K.Schum.) Backeb.; Parodia claviceps (F.Ritter) F.H.Brandt; Parodia columnaris Cárdenas; Parodia comarapana Cárdenas; Parodia commutans F.Ritter; Parodia concinna (Monv.) N.P.Taylor; Parodia crassigibba (F.Ritter) N.P.Taylor; Parodia curvispina (F.Ritter) D.R.Hunt; Parodia diersiana Jucker; Parodia erinaceus (Haw.) N.P.Taylor; Parodia × erubescens (Osten) D.R.Hunt; Parodia formosa F.Ritter; Parodia fusca (F.Ritter) Hofacker & P.J.Braun; Parodia gaucha M.Machado & Larocca; Parodia gibbulosoides F.H.Brandt; Parodia haselbergii (Haage ex Rümpler) F.H.Brandt; Parodia hausteiniana Rausch; Parodia hegeri Diers, Krahn & Beckert; Parodia herteri (Werderm.) N.P.Taylor; Parodia horrida F.H.Brandt; Parodia horstii (F.Ritter) N.P.Taylor; Parodia ibicuiensis (Prestlé) Anceschi & Magli; Parodia langsdorfii (Lehm.) D.R.Hunt; Parodia larapuntensis Diers & Jucker; Parodia lenninghausii (F.Haage) F.H.Brandt ex Eggli & Hofacker; Parodia linkii (Lehm.) R.Kiesling; Parodia maassii (Heese) A.Berger; Parodia magnifica (F.Ritter) F.H.Brandt; Parodia mairanana Cárdenas; Parodia mammulosa (Lem.) N.P.Taylor; Parodia microsperma (F.A.C.Weber) Speg.; Parodia mueller-melchersii (Frič ex Backeb.) N.P.Taylor; Parodia muricata (Link & Otto ex Pfeiff.) Hofacker; Parodia neoarechavaletae (Havlíček) D.R.Hunt; Parodia neobuenekeri (F.Ritter) Anceschi & Magli; Parodia neohorstii N.P.Taylor; Parodia nigrispina (K.Schum.) F.H.Brandt; Parodia nivosa Backeb.; Parodia nothorauschii D.R.Hunt; Parodia ocampoi Cárdenas; Parodia otaviana Cárdenas; Parodia ottonis (Lehm.) N.P.Taylor; Parodia oxycostata (Buining & Brederoo) Hofacker; Parodia prestoensis F.H.Brandt; Parodia procera F.Ritter; Parodia rechensis (Buining) F.H.Brandt; Parodia ritteri Buining; Parodia roseolutea (Vliet) Hofacker, A.S.Oliveira & R.Pontes; Parodia schumanniana (Nicolai) F.H.Brandt; Parodia schwebsiana (Werderm.) Backeb.; Parodia scopa (Spreng.) N.P.Taylor; Parodia stockingeri (Prestlé) Hofacker & P.J.Braun; Parodia stuemeri (Werderm.) Backeb.; Parodia subterranea F.Ritter; Parodia taratensis Cárdenas; Parodia tenuicylindrica (F.Ritter) D.R.Hunt; Parodia tuberculata Cárdenas; Parodia warasii (F.Ritter) F.H.Brandt; Parodia werdermanniana (Herter) N.P.Taylor
	Rimacactus Mottram 2001		Rimacactus laui (Lüthy) Mottram
	Yavia R.Kiesling & Piltz 2001		Yavia cryptocarpa R.Kiesling & Piltz
