= Ball cactus =

The term ball cactus is usually applied to the species of:

- Parodia (syn. Notocactus), a South American cactus genus often kept as houseplants

It has also been applied to any ball-shaped cactus, notably plants from all of the following genera:

- Coryphantha
- Echinocactus
- Echinomastus
- Escobaria
- Gymnocalycium
- Mammillaria
- Melocactus
- Pediocactus
- Turbinicarpus

And more specifically to:

- Escobaria missouriensis, the Missouri foxtail cactus or common ball cactus
- Escobaria vivipara, the spinystar or purple ball cactus
- Gymnocalycium mihanovichii, the ruby ball or "moon" cactus
- Parodia leninghausii, the golden ball cactus or lemon ball cactus
- Parodia magnifica, the ball cactus or balloon cactus
- Parodia scopa, the silver ball cactus
- Pediocactus simpsonii, the mountain ball cactus
