= Hickenia =

Disambiguation between two genus names

Hickenia is the name of two genera of flowering plants, both named after Cristóbal María Hicken:

- Hickenia Lillo, a genus of Apocynaceae containing one species now reclassified as Morrenia scalae (Hicken) Goyder
- Hickenia Britton & Rose, a genus of Cactaceae which included species now classified as Parodia

The second of these, having been published in Britton and Rose's Cactaceae (1922) is an illegitimate homonym of the former, which was published three years earlier in Physis (Buenos Aires) 4: 422.
