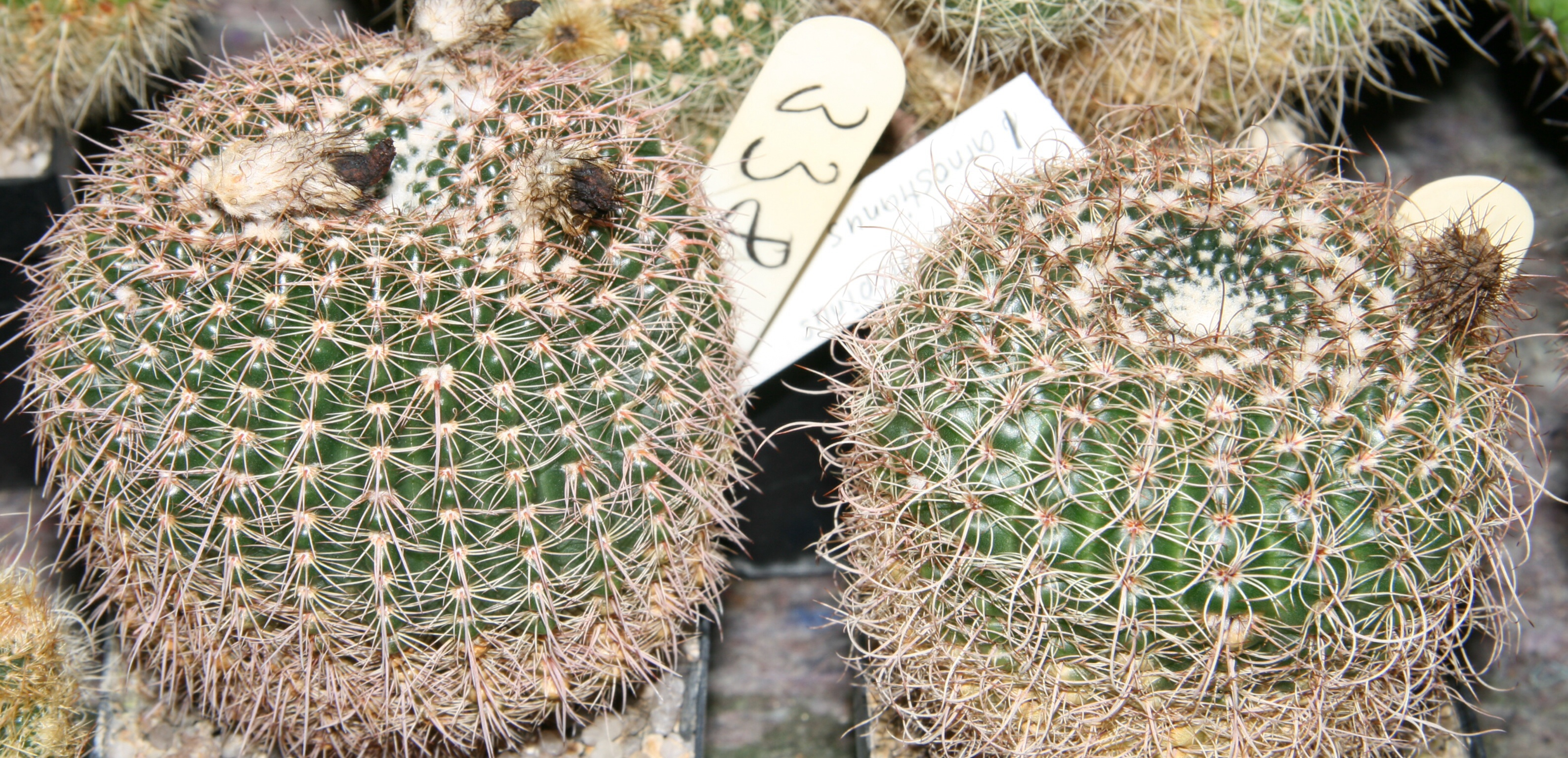

Scientific classification
- Kingdom: Plantae
- Clade: Tracheophytes
- Clade: Angiosperms
- Clade: Eudicots
- Order: Caryophyllales
- Family: Cactaceae
- Subfamily: Cactoideae
- Genus: Parodia
- Species: P. curvispina

Binomial name
- Parodia curvispina (F.Ritter) D.R.Hunt

Synonyms
- Notocactus arnostianus Lisal & Kolerik; Parodia arnostiana (Lisal & Kolarik) Hofacker

= Parodia curvispina =

Species of cactus

Parodia curvispina is a species of cactus in the genus Parodia. The small, squat green plants produce yellow flowers, green fruit and black seeds. The species is found growing in Rio Grande do Sul, Brazil.

== Taxonomy ==
The species was first described as Notocactus arnostianus by Lisal & Kolerik in 1986. Despite objections from hobbyists (among whom Notocactus species were popular) Notocactus (and others) were synonymised under Parodia. The species was given its current name in 1998 by Hofacker.

== Description ==
Parodia curvispina are green to dark green cacti that are 4 to 6 centimetres (1.6 to 2.4 in) in height, and 4 to 8 centimetres (1.6 to 3.1 in) in diameter. There are between 21 and 30 spiralling ribs, with round areoles topped with white wool. Each areole has from one to three central spines which are yellowish brown to yellowish red in color. There are between 12 and 16 radial spines, which curve, and are from straw-yellow to brownish-red in color. The central spines (which are between 5 and 20 millimetres (0.20 and 0.79 in) long) can be difficult to differentiate from the radial spines (which are up to 7 millimetres (0.28 in) in length). The species produces sulphur yellow flowers (which are between 7 and 7.5 centimetres (2.8 and 3.0 in) in diameter), green fruit (which are between 1.6 and 1.8 centimetres (0.63 and 0.71 in) in length by 1.2 to 1.4 centimetres (0.47 to 0.55 in) wide) and cap-shaped black seeds.

== Distribution ==
Parodia curvispina grows typically grows solitarily, occasionally branching. It can be found in Rio Grande do Sul, Brazil.
