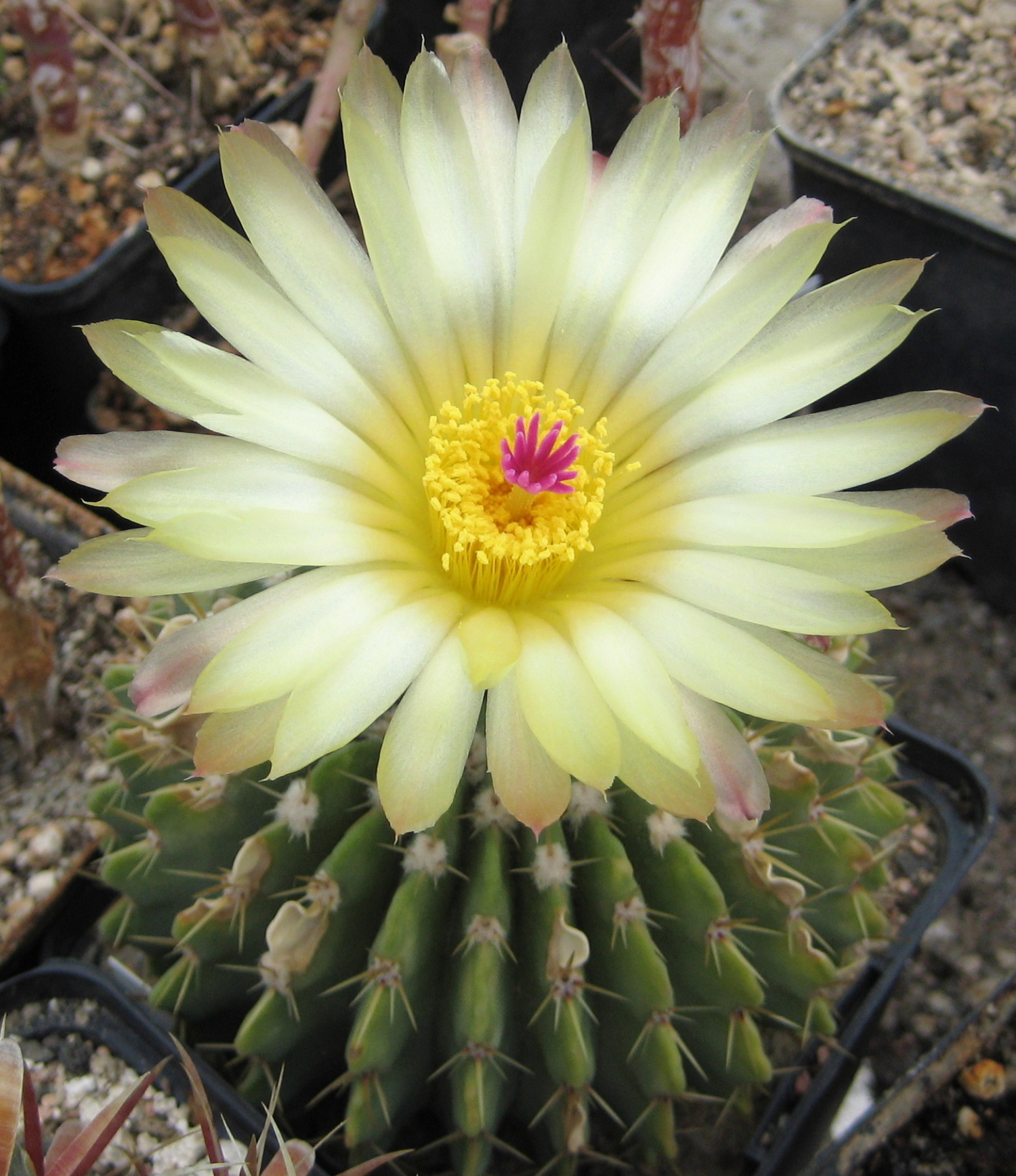

Scientific classification
- Kingdom: Plantae
- Clade: Tracheophytes
- Clade: Angiosperms
- Clade: Eudicots
- Order: Caryophyllales
- Family: Cactaceae
- Subfamily: Cactoideae
- Genus: Parodia
- Species: P. buiningii

Binomial name
- Parodia buiningii (Buxbaum) N.P.Taylor

Synonyms
- Notocactus buiningii Buxbaum

= Parodia buiningii =

Species of plant

Parodia buiningii is a rare species of cactus native to South America. It is a solitary spherical or oblate cactus only a few inches in height with long, yellow spines. It bears yellow flowers, and produces hairy fruit and black seeds. It is found surrounding the towns of Santana do Livramento, Brazil and Rivera, Uruguay.

== Taxonomy ==
The species was first described as Notocactus buiningii by F. Buxbaum in 1968, and was given its current name by N. P. Taylor in 1968, based on Buxbaum's earlier description. Despite objections from hobbyists (among whom Notocactus species were popular) Notocactus (and others) have now been synonymised under Parodia.

== Description ==
The grass-green cacti are up to 8 centimetres (3.1 in) in height by up to 12 centimetres (4.7 in) in width. There are 16 thin ribs which are up to 2 centimetres (0.79 in) in height. They have small tubercles. The areoles, which are sunken under the tubercles, are initially woolly, though they lose the wool as they mature. Each areole has four yellow spines of 20 to 30 millimetres (0.79 to 1.18 in) in length; the spines have dark bases, and form a cross. The cactus produces yellow flowers up to 8 centimetres (3.1 in) in diameter with pericarpels covered in bristles and brown wool. It produces hairy fruit of up to 3 centimetres (1.2 in) in length and matte black seeds.

== Distribution ==
Parodia buiningii grows solitarily. It is found around Santana do Livramento, Rio Grande do Sul, Brazil and the neighboring Rivera, Uruguay. However, the species is rare. It grows sympatrically with Parodia allosiphon, with which it is closely related.
