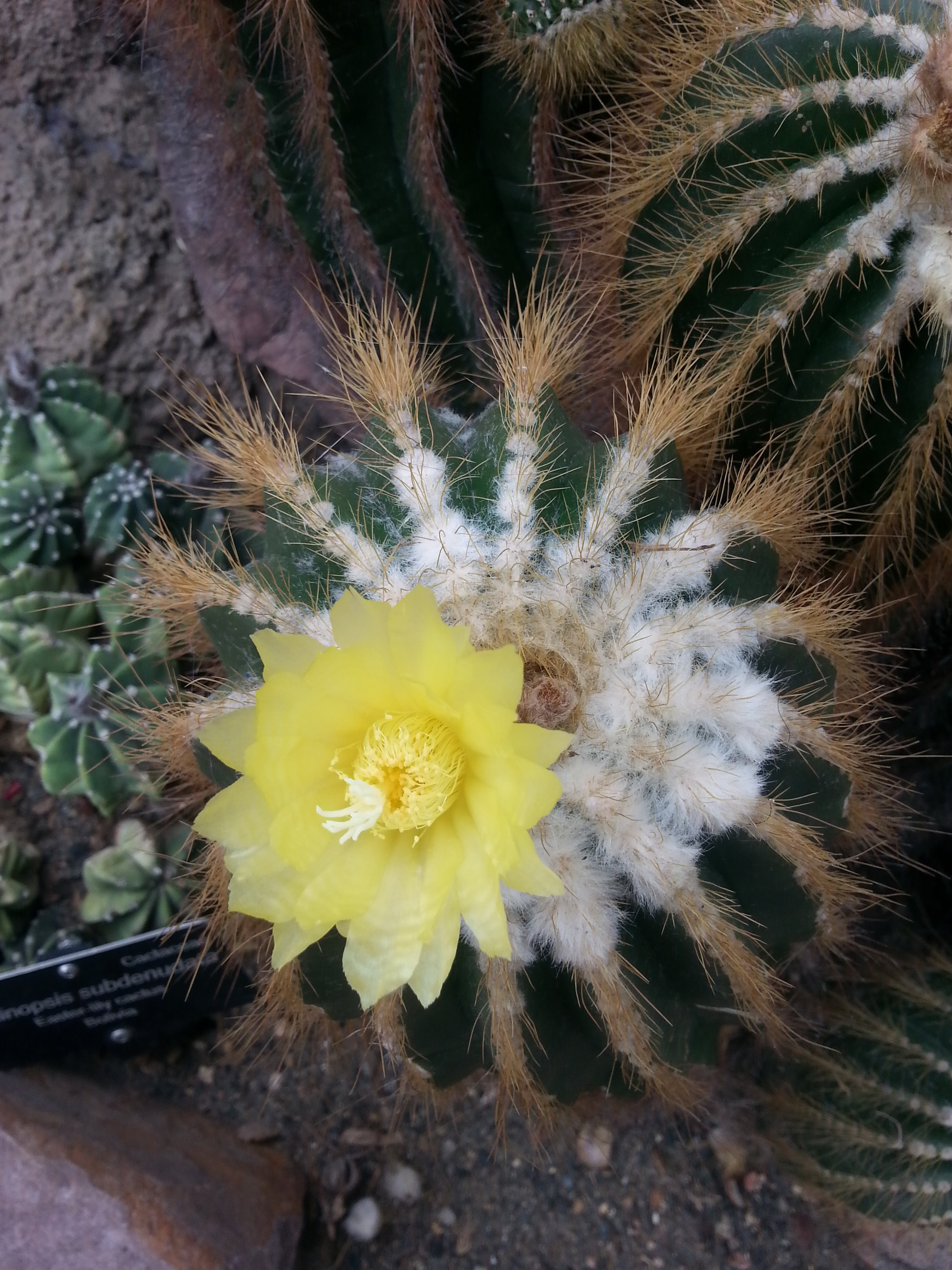

Conservation status
- Endangered (IUCN 3.1)

Scientific classification
- Kingdom: Plantae
- Clade: Tracheophytes
- Clade: Angiosperms
- Clade: Eudicots
- Order: Caryophyllales
- Family: Cactaceae
- Subfamily: Cactoideae
- Genus: Parodia
- Species: P. warasii

Binomial name
- Parodia warasii (F.Ritter) F.H.Brandt

= Parodia warasii =

Species of cactus

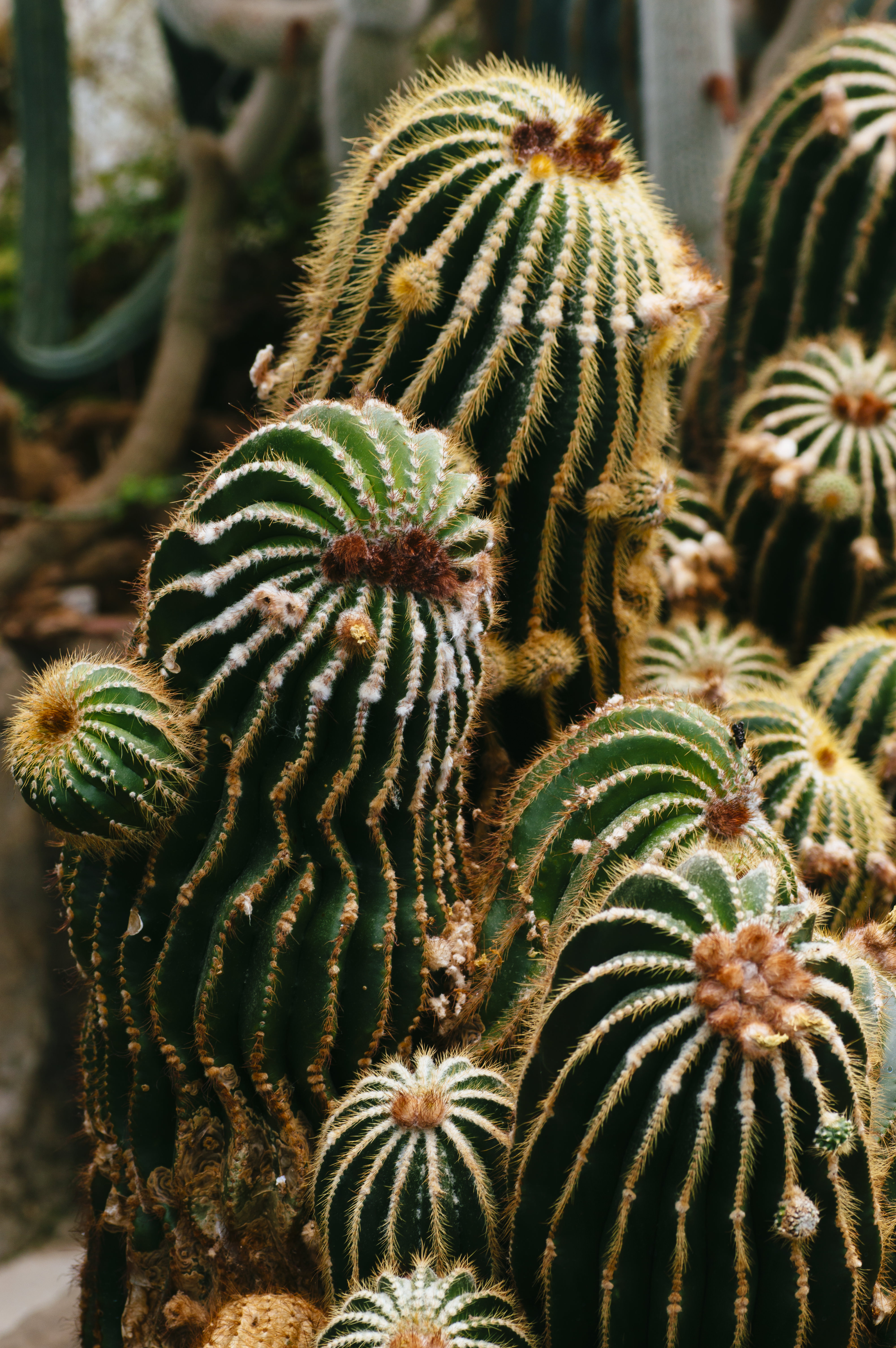
A Parodia warasii in a greenhouse in Kalimpong

Parodia warasii is a cactus native to Brazil. Its small range is threatened by landslides.
