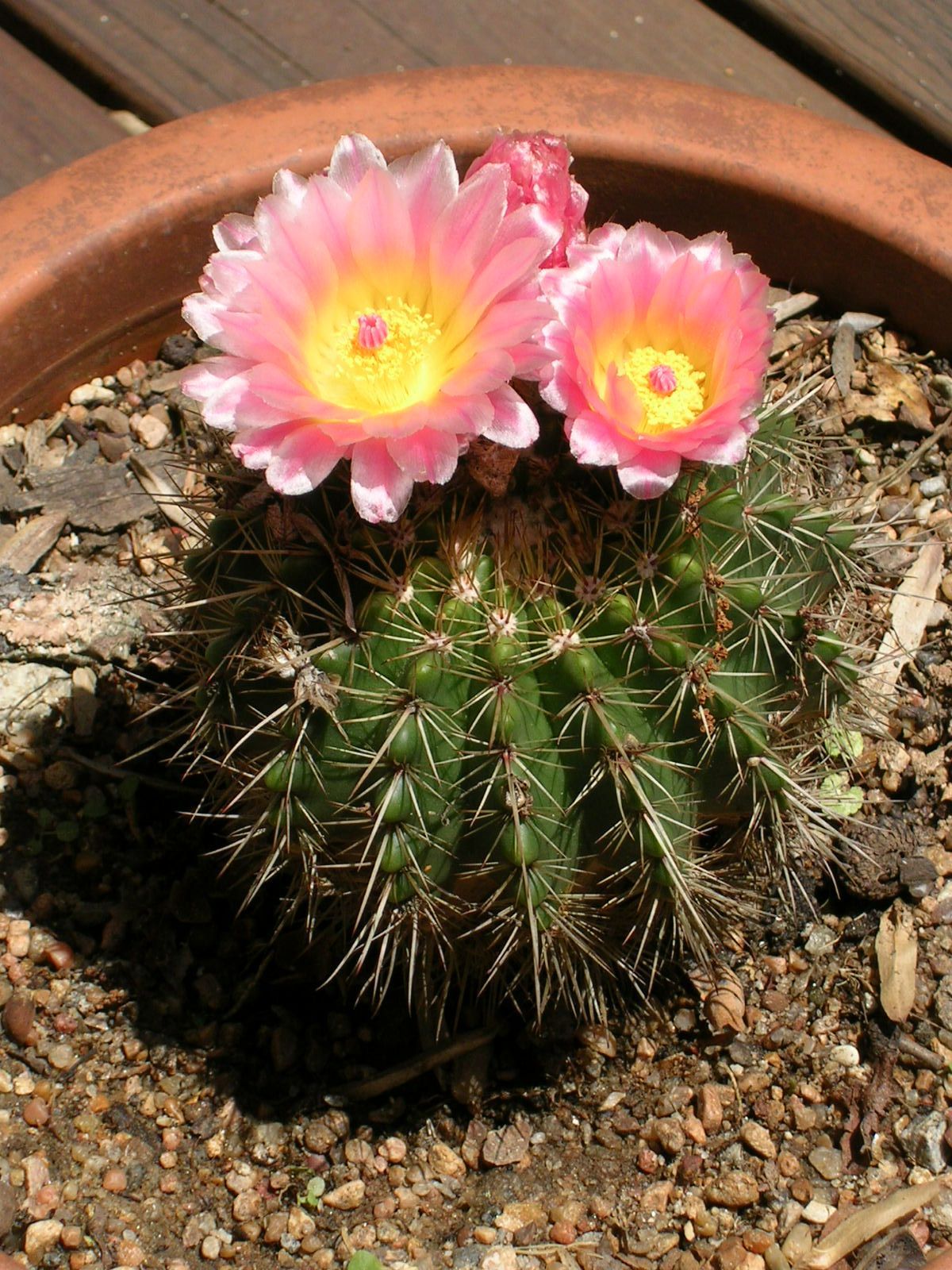

Conservation status
- Critically Endangered (IUCN 3.1)

Scientific classification
- Kingdom: Plantae
- Clade: Tracheophytes
- Clade: Angiosperms
- Clade: Eudicots
- Order: Caryophyllales
- Family: Cactaceae
- Subfamily: Cactoideae
- Genus: Parodia
- Species: P. herteri

Binomial name
- Parodia herteri (Werderm.) N.P.Taylor

Synonyms
- Notocactus herteri (Werderm.) Buining & Kreuz.; Notocactus pseudoherteri Buining

= Parodia herteri =

Species of cactus

Parodia herteri is a species of cactus in the subfamily Cactoideae. It is endemic to Brazil. It was named for botanist Wilhelm Herter. The first description was in 1936 as Echinocactus herteri by Erich Werdermann. It was described as Parodia herteri in 1987 by Nigel Paul Taylor.
