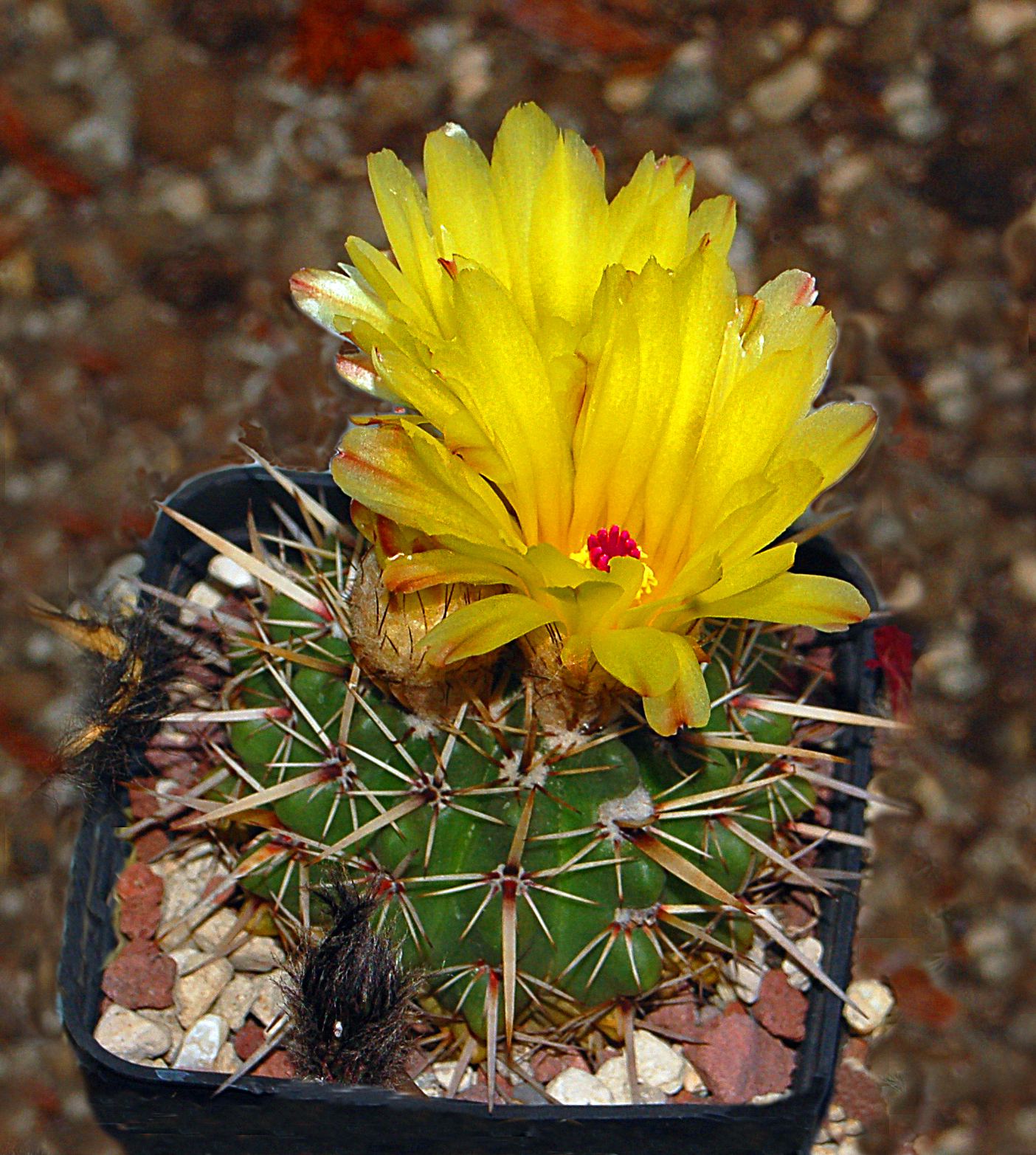
- At the Orto Botanico dell'Università di Genova

Scientific classification
- Kingdom: Plantae
- Clade: Tracheophytes
- Clade: Angiosperms
- Clade: Eudicots
- Order: Caryophyllales
- Family: Cactaceae
- Subfamily: Cactoideae
- Genus: Parodia
- Species: P. mammulosa

Binomial name
- Parodia mammulosa (Lemaire) N.P.Taylor

Synonyms
- Echinocactus floricomus Arech.; Echinocactus mammulosus Lemaire; Notocactus erythracanthus Schlosser et Brederoo; Notocactus eugeniae van Vliet; Notocactus floricomus (Arech.) Backeb., Notocactus macambarensis Prestlé; Notocactus mammulosus (Lem.) Backeb.; Notocactus megalanthus Schl. et Bred.; Notocactus mueller-moelleri Frič ex Fleischer; Notocactus roseoluteus van Vliet

= Parodia mammulosa =

Species of cactus

Parodia mammulosa is a species of succulent plant in the family Cactaceae.

== Description ==
Parodia mammulosa is a perennial globose plant with flattened apex and a dark green surface, reaching a diameter of about 15 cm. The species shows about 18 vertical ribs with large pointed tubercles. The radial spines are about 12, needle-like, up to 1 cm long, while the single central spine reaches 2 cm. The flowers bloom in Spring and usually they are pale yellow, with a diameter of about 5 cm.

== Distribution ==
This species is native to Argentina, Brazil (Rio Grande do Sul) and Uruguay.

== Gallery ==
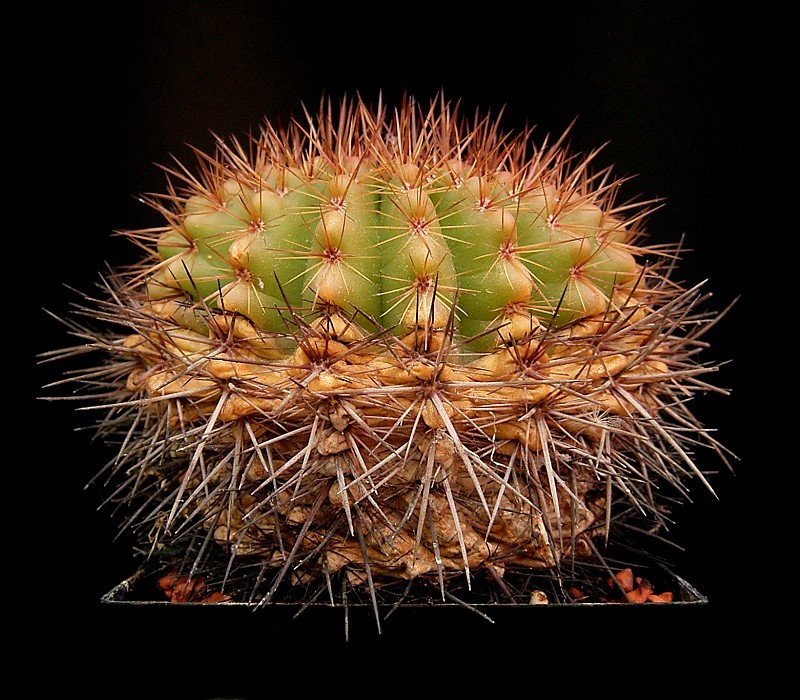

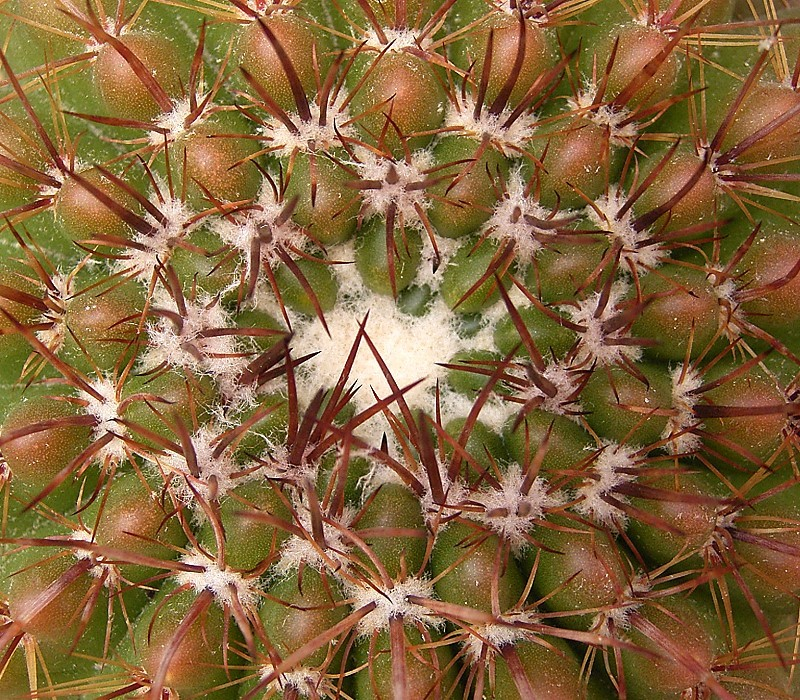

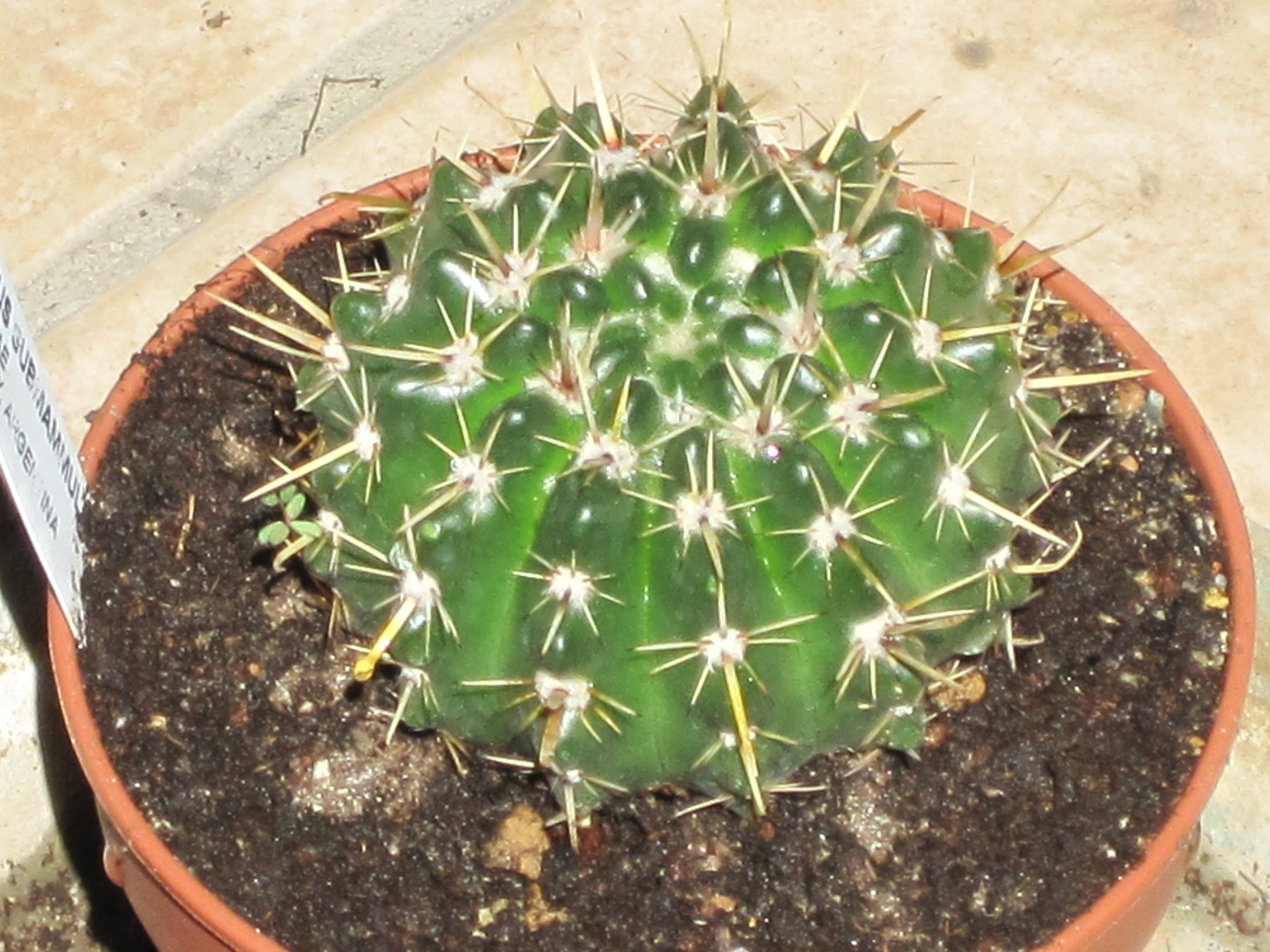

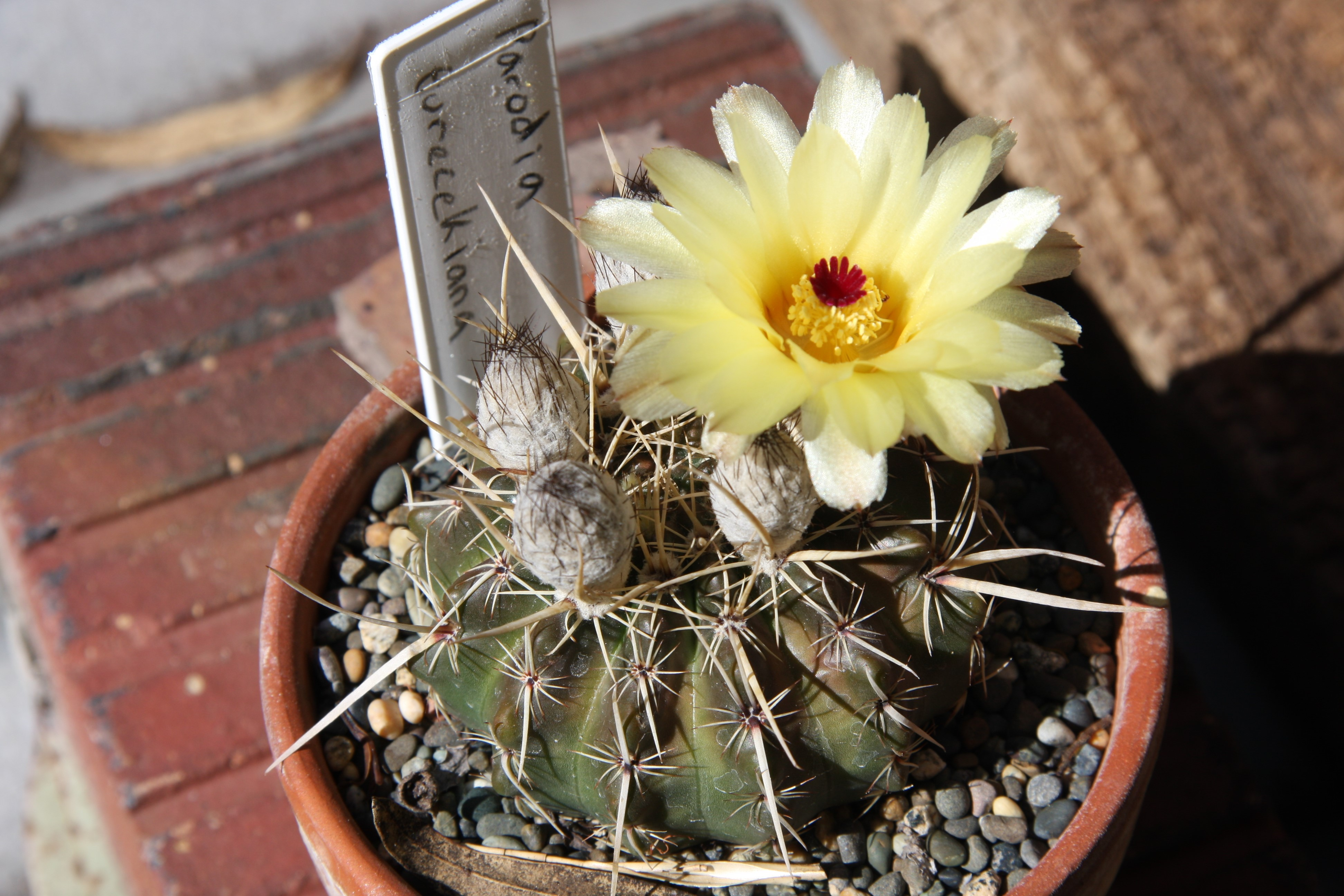
