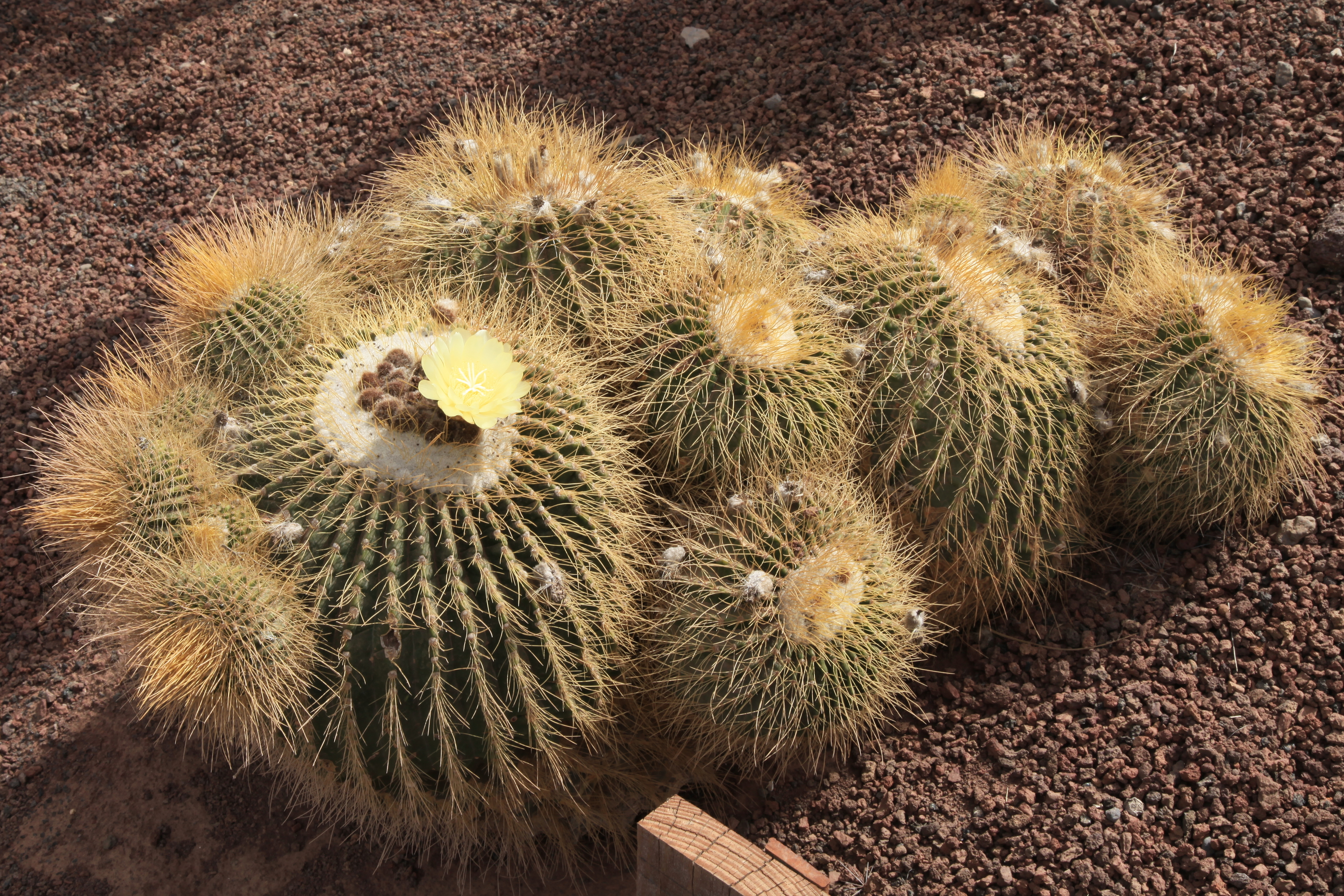

Scientific classification
- Kingdom: Plantae
- Clade: Tracheophytes
- Clade: Angiosperms
- Clade: Eudicots
- Order: Caryophyllales
- Family: Cactaceae
- Subfamily: Cactoideae
- Genus: Parodia
- Species: P. schumanniana

Binomial name
- Parodia schumanniana (Nicolai) F.H.Brandt

Synonyms
- Echinocactus grossei Schumann; Echinocactus schumannianus Nicolai; Eriocactus claviceps Ritter; Notocactus ampliocostatus (Ritt.) Theunissen; Notocactus claviceps (Ritt.) Krainz; Notocactus grossei (Schumann) Frič; Notocactus schumannianus (Nicolai) Frič; Parodia claviceps (Ritt) Brandt; Parodia schumanniana subsp. claviceps (Ritt.) Hofacker

= Parodia schumanniana =

Species of cactus

Parodia schumanniana is a quite rare species of succulent plant in the family Cactaceae. The specific epithet schumanniana honors the cactus specialist Karl Moritz Schumann.

== Description ==
Parodia schumanniana is a perennial globular to columnar plant with a diameter of about 30 cm and a height up to 1.8 meters. The 21-48 well-marked ribs are straight and sharp. The bristle-like, straight to slightly curved spines are initially golden yellow, turning to brown or red and gray later. The one to three central spines, which can sometimes also be absent, are 1 to 3 inches long. The flowers bloom in Summer. They are lemon-yellow to golden yellow, with a diameter of about 4.5 to 6.5 cm. The fruits are spherical to ovoid, covered with dense wool and bristles and have diameters up to 1.5 centimeters. They contains reddish-brown to almost black seeds, which are nearly smooth and 1 to 1.2 millimeters long.

== Distribution ==
This species is distributed in southern Brazil, southern Paraguay and northeastern Argentina. It prefers rocky slopes.

== Subspecies ==
- Parodia schumanniana subsp. schumanniana
- Parodia schumanniana subsp. claviceps (F.Ritter) Hofacker & P.J.Braun
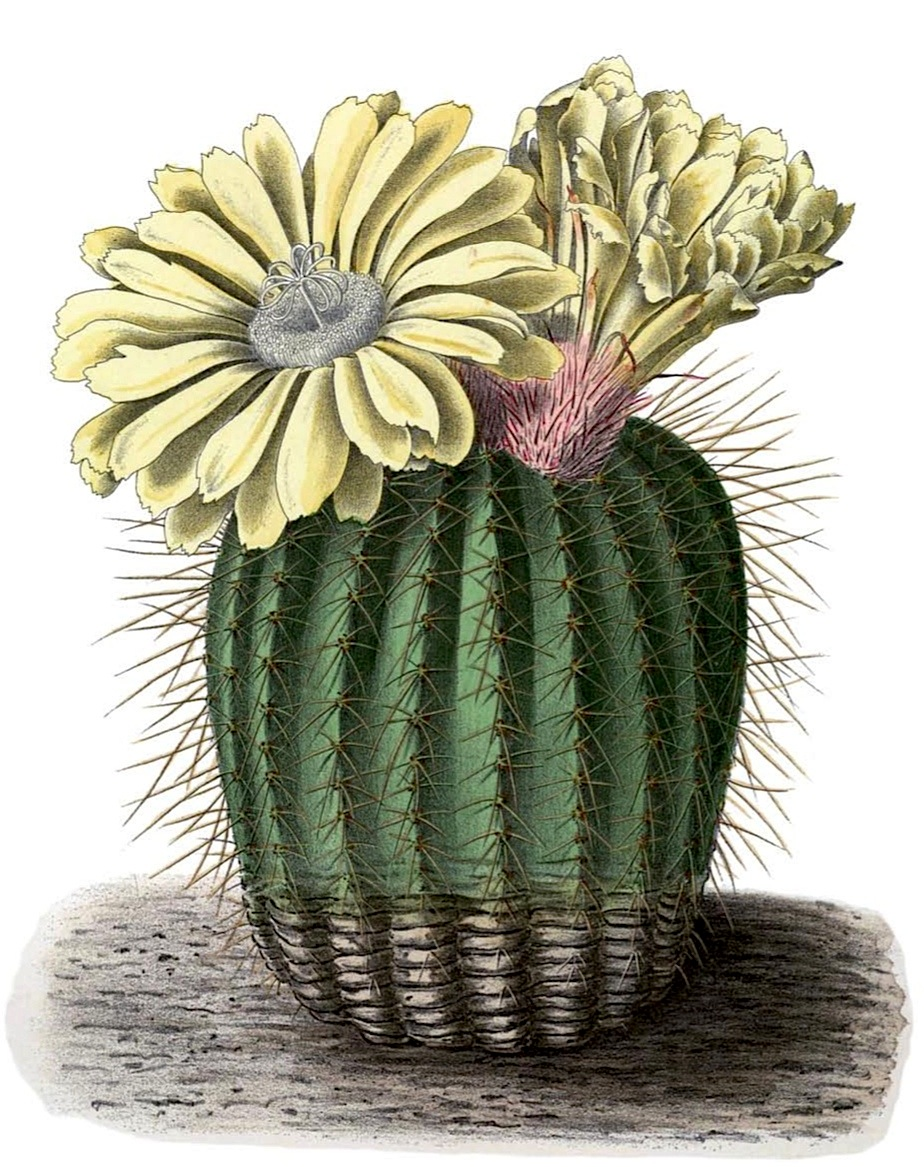
Illustration of Parodia schumanniana from Blühende Kakteen - Iconographia Cactacearum
