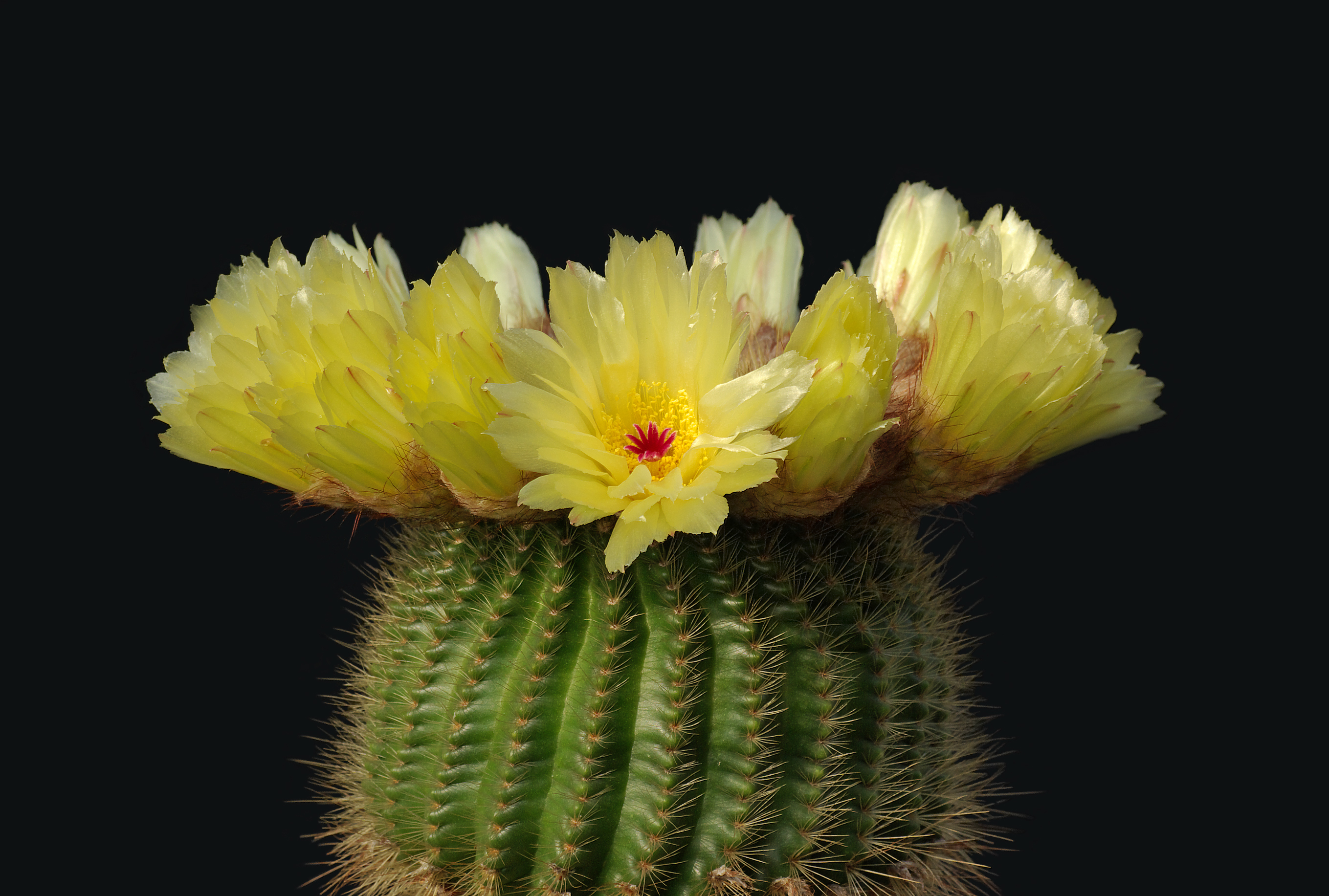

Scientific classification
- Kingdom: Plantae
- Clade: Tracheophytes
- Clade: Angiosperms
- Clade: Eudicots
- Order: Caryophyllales
- Family: Cactaceae
- Subfamily: Cactoideae
- Genus: Parodia
- Species: P. tenuicylindrica

Binomial name
- Parodia tenuicylindrica (F.Ritter) D.R.Hunt

Synonyms
- Notocactus minimus Frič & Kruizinger ex Bruining 1940; Notocactus tenuicylindricus F.Ritter 1970

= Parodia tenuicylindrica =

Species of cactus

Parodia tenuicylindrica is a species of cactus from the genus Parodia. The small green cacti have yellow and red-brown spines, white wool and yellow flowers. They produce yellow-green fruit, and black seeds. P. tenuicylindrica can be found growing individually in Rio Grande do Sul, Brazil.

== Taxonomy ==
The species was originally described as Notocactus minimus by Frič & Kruizinger in 1940, based on a description by Bruining. It was later described as Notocactus tenuicylindricus by Friedrich Ritter. Despite objections from hobbyists (among whom Notocactus species were popular) Notocactus (and others) were synonymised under Parodia. In 1997, based on Ritter's earlier description, D. R. Hunt classified the species as Parodia tenuicylindrica.

== Description ==
Parodia tenuicylindrica are cylindrical cacti which are green to blue-green. In height, they are 4 to 8 centimetres (1.6 to 3.1 in) and are from 2 to 3 centimetres (0.79 to 1.18 in) in width. The plants have 13-21 notched and tuberculate ribs. On top of the tubercles, there are areoles with white wool. The species has straight and stout spines; the radial spines, of which there are between ten and fifteen, are pale yellow, and between 3 and 4 millimetres (0.12 and 0.16 in) in length, while the 2-4 red-brown central spines are between 3 and 6 millimetres (0.12 and 0.24 in) long. The species produces lemon yellow flowers (which are up to 4.3 centimetres (1.7 in) long) and greenish-yellow fruits. The seeds are black oblongs with tubercles.

== Distribution ==
Parodia tenuicylindrica can be found growing solitarily in Rio Grande do Sul, Brazil. It is currently classified as Endangered (EN) on the IUCN Red List, with major threats reported to be fires, cattle grazing due to trampling, agriculture, and forestry.
