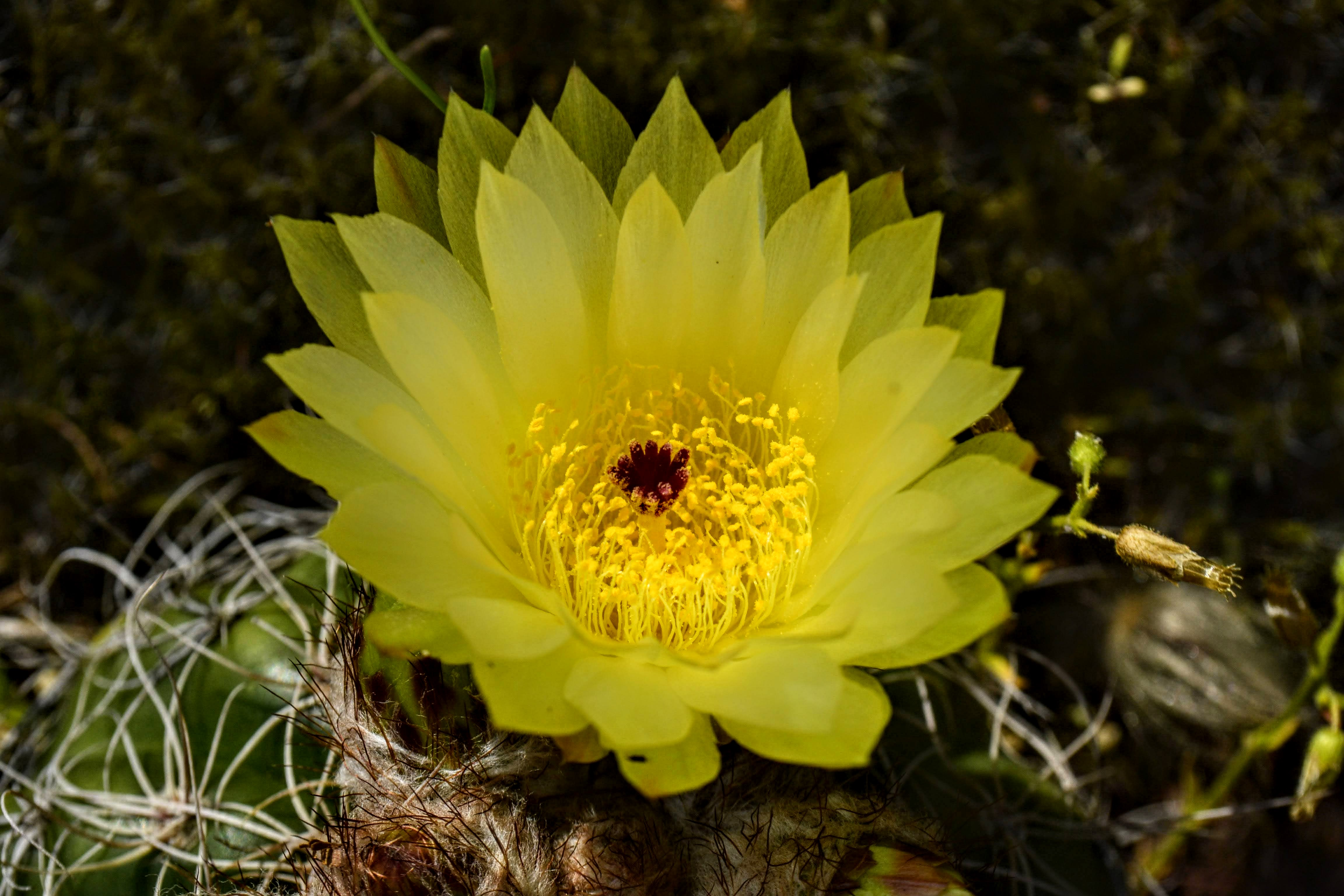

Conservation status
- Vulnerable (IUCN 3.1)

Scientific classification
- Kingdom: Plantae
- Clade: Tracheophytes
- Clade: Angiosperms
- Clade: Eudicots
- Order: Caryophyllales
- Family: Cactaceae
- Subfamily: Cactoideae
- Genus: Parodia
- Species: P. ottonis

Binomial name
- Parodia ottonis (Lehm.) N.P.Taylor

Synonyms
- List: Cactus ottonis Lehm.; Echinocactus ottonis (Lehm.) Link & Otto; Malacocarpus ottonis (Lehm.) Britton & Rose; Notocactus neo-ottoianus Y.Itô; Notocactus ottoianus Y.Itô; Notocactus ottonis (Lehm.) A.Berger; Peronocactus ottonis (Lehm.) Doweld; Echinocactus amambayensis Werderm.; Echinocactus araneolarius Rchb.; Echinocactus arechavaletae Speg.; Echinocactus ottonis var. brasiliensis F.Haage; Echinocactus ottonis f. brasiliensis (F.Haage) Schelle; Echinocactus ottonis var. linkii C.F.Först.; Echinocactus ottonis var. minor C.F.Först.; Echinocactus ottonis var. multiflorus Frič; Echinocactus ottonis var. pallidior Monv. ex Lem.; Echinocactus ottonis f. paraguayensis (K.Schum.) Schelle; Echinocactus ottonis var. paraguayensis K.Schum.; Echinocactus ottonis var. spinosior Monv. ex Lem.; Echinocactus ottonis var. tenuispinus (Link & Otto) Pfeiff.; Echinocactus ottonis f. tenuispinus (Link & Otto) Schelle; Echinocactus ottonis f. tortuosus (Link & Otto) Schelle; Echinocactus ottonis var. tortuosus (Link & Otto) K.Schum.; Echinocactus ottonis var. uruguayus Arechav.; Echinocactus spegazzinii Gürke; Echinocactus tenuispinus Link & Otto; Echinocactus tenuispinus var. minor Link & Otto; Echinocactus tortuosus Link & Otto; Melocactus tenuispinus Link & Otto; Notocactus araneolarius (Rchb.) Herter; Notocactus arechavaletae (Speg.) Herter; Notocactus arechavaletae var. alacriportanus F.Ritter; Notocactus arechavaletae var. aureus F.Ritter; Notocactus arechavaletae var. buenekeri F.Ritter; Notocactus arechavaletae var. horstii F.Ritter; Notocactus arechavaletae var. limiticola F.Ritter; Notocactus arechavaletae var. nanus F.Ritter; Notocactus arechavaletae var. rubescens F.Ritter; Notocactus campestrensis F.Ritter; Notocactus eurypleurus Prestlé; Notocactus glaucinus F.Ritter; Notocactus glaucinus f. densispinus (Bergner) N.Gerloff & Neduchal; Notocactus glaucinus var. depressus F.Ritter; Notocactus glaucinus var. incomptus (N.Gerloff) N.Gerloff & Neduchal; Notocactus globularis F.Ritter; Notocactus grandiensis Bergner; Notocactus incomptus N.Gerloff; Notocactus laetivirens f. densispinus Bergner; Notocactus miniatispinus (F.Ritter) Havlíček; Notocactus minimus var. ruoffii (N.Gerloff) N.Gerloff & Neduchal; Notocactus minusculus Hofacker & K.Herm; Notocactus neo-ottoianus var. schuldtii Y.Itô; Notocactus neo-ottoianus var. stenogonus (Backeb.) Y.Itô; Notocactus neo-ottoianus var. tenuispinus (Link & Otto) Y.Itô; Notocactus neo-ottoianus var. tortuosus (Link & Otto) Y.Itô; Notocactus ottonis var. acutangularis F.Ritter; Notocactus ottonis var. albispinus Backeb.; Notocactus ottonis f. aureus (F.Ritter) N.Gerloff & Neduchal; Notocactus ottonis f. elegans (Backeb. & Voll) Havlíček; Notocactus ottonis var. elegans Backeb. & Voll; Notocactus ottonis f. globularis (F.Ritter) N.Gerloff & Neduchal; Notocactus ottonis var. globularis (F.Ritter) Bergner; Notocactus ottonis subsp. horstii (F.Ritter) Doweld; Notocactus ottonis var. janousekianus Papoušek; Notocactus ottonis var. minusculus (Hofacker & K.Herm) N.Gerloff & Neduchal; Notocactus ottonis var. nigrispinus Luck; Notocactus ottonis subvar. rubrispinus Prestlé; Notocactus ottonis var. schuldtii Kreuz.; Notocactus ottonis var. stenogonus Backeb.; Notocactus oxycostatus f. miniatispinus (F.Ritter) N.Gerloff; Notocactus oxycostatus var. occidentalis N.Gerloff; Notocactus oxycostatus var. schuldtii (Kreuz.) N.Gerloff; Notocactus oxycostatus f. securituberculatus (F.Ritter) N.Gerloff; Notocactus ruoffii N.Gerloff; Notocactus securituberculatus F.Ritter; Notocactus securituberculatus var. miniatispinus F.Ritter; Notocactus spegazzinii Vích; Notocactus spegazzinii var. alacriportanus (F.Ritter) Vích; Notocactus spegazzinii var. aureus (F.Ritter) Vích; Notocactus spegazzinii var. buenekeri (F.Ritter) Vích; Notocactus spegazzinii var. horstii (F.Ritter) Vích; Notocactus spegazzinii var. limiticola (F.Ritter) Vích; Notocactus spegazzinii var. nanus (F.Ritter) Vích; Notocactus spegazzinii var. rubescens (F.Ritter) Vích; Notocactus tenuispinus (Link & Otto) Herter; Notocactus tenuispinus f. cristatus P.V.Heath; Notocactus uruguayus (Arechav.) Herter; Opuntia ottonis G.Don; Parodia amambayensis (Werderm.) Borg; Parodia glaucina (F.Ritter) Hofacker & M.Machado; Parodia nothominuscula Hofacker; Parodia nothominuscula subsp. gravior Hofacker; Parodia ottonis subsp. horstii (F.Ritter) Hofacker; Parodia ottonis var. tortuosa (Link & Otto) N.P.Taylor; Parodia paraguayensis Speg.; Peronocactus minusculus (Hofacker & K.Herm) Doweld; Peronocactus ottonis subsp. horstii (F.Ritter) Doweld

= Parodia ottonis =

Species of cactus

Parodia ottonis, also known as Indian head cactus, is a species of flowering plant in the family Cactaceae. This cactus species is found in Argentina, Brazil, Paraguay and Uruguay. There are two recognized subspecies. The epithet ottonis honors the German botanist Christoph Friedrich Otto.

== Description ==
The plant at first grows individually and later forms groups. The light to dark green or blue-green spherical shoots are often tapered towards the base. They reach diameters of 3 to 15 centimeters. The six to 16 distinct ribs are rounded or sharp-edged. There are usually only a few areoles on each rib. The bristle-like thorns that spring from them are straight, curved or twisted. The one to four central spines are brownish, reddish brown or yellowish and have a length of 0.8 to 4 centimeters. The four to 15 spines are whitish to yellowish or brownish and 0.5 to 3 centimeters long.

The usually yellow flowers, rarely orange-red or red, reach lengths of 5 to 6 centimeters and would appear in late summer. Its flower tube is covered with brownish wool and bristles. The scars are dark red. The thick-walled egg-shaped to short cylindrical fruits tear open. They have diameters from 0.9 to 1.3 centimeters. The fruits contain, often very numerous, bell-shaped, glossy black seeds, which are strongly humped.

== Range ==
Parodia ottonis is common in southern Brazil, southern Paraguay, Uruguay, and northeastern Argentina.

== Taxonomy ==
The first description as Cactus ottonis by Johann Georg Christian Lehmann was published in 1827. Nigel Paul Taylor presented the type 1987 in the genus Parodia. Other nomenclatural synonyms are Echinocactus ottonis (Lehm.) Link & Otto (1830), Malacocarpus ottonis (Lehm.) Britton & Rose (1922), Notocactus ottonis (Lehm.) A.Berger (1929) and Peronocactus ottonis (Lehm.)

The following subspecies are distinguished:

- Parodia ottonis subsp. ottonis
- Parodia ottonis subsp. Horstii (F. Knight)

== Gallery ==
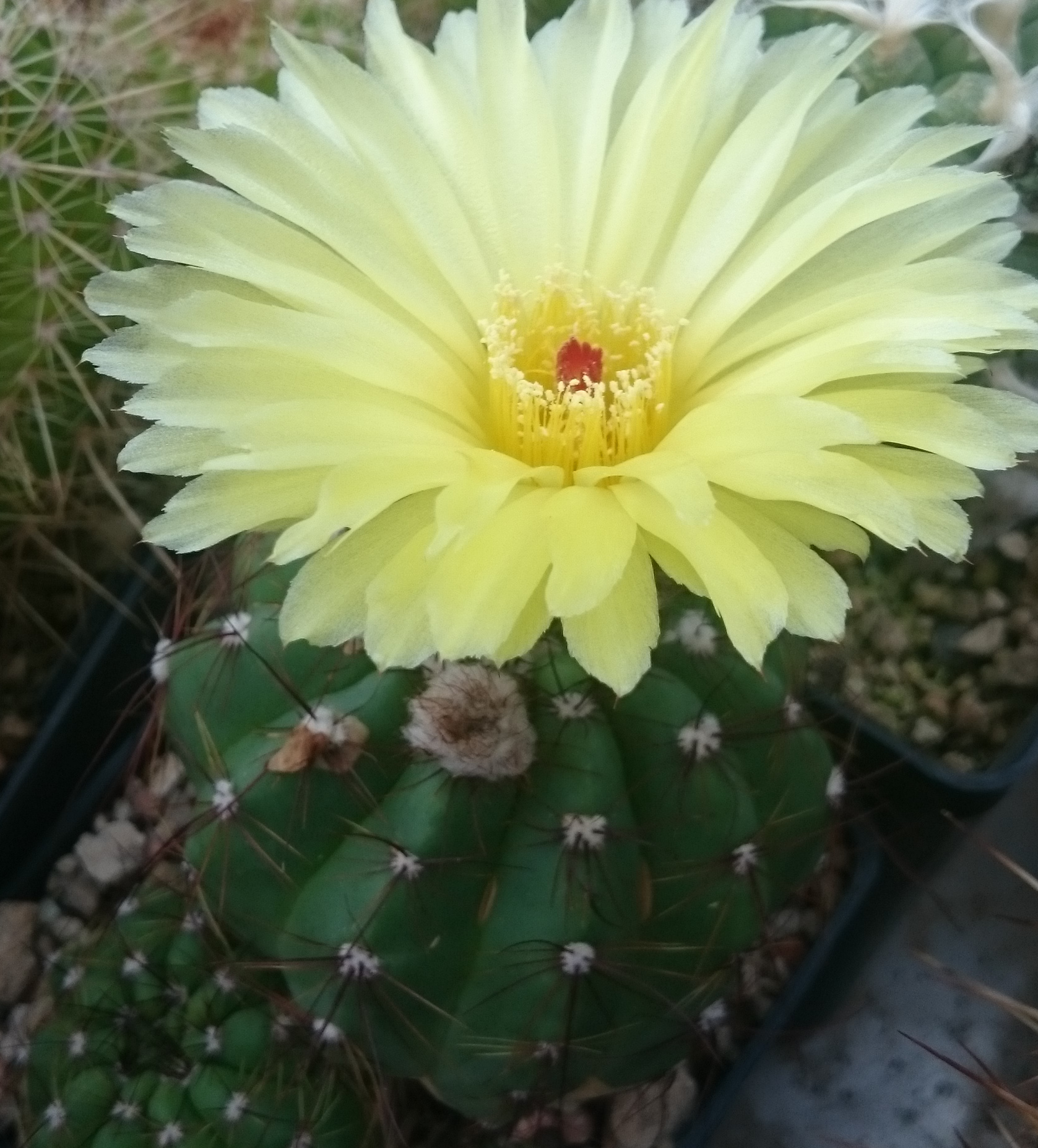
A flowering specimen

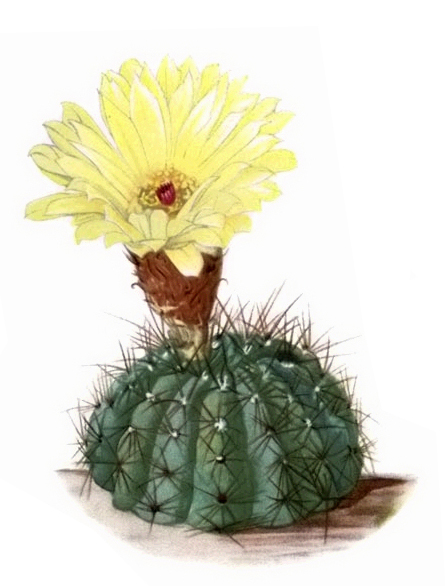
Botanical illustration

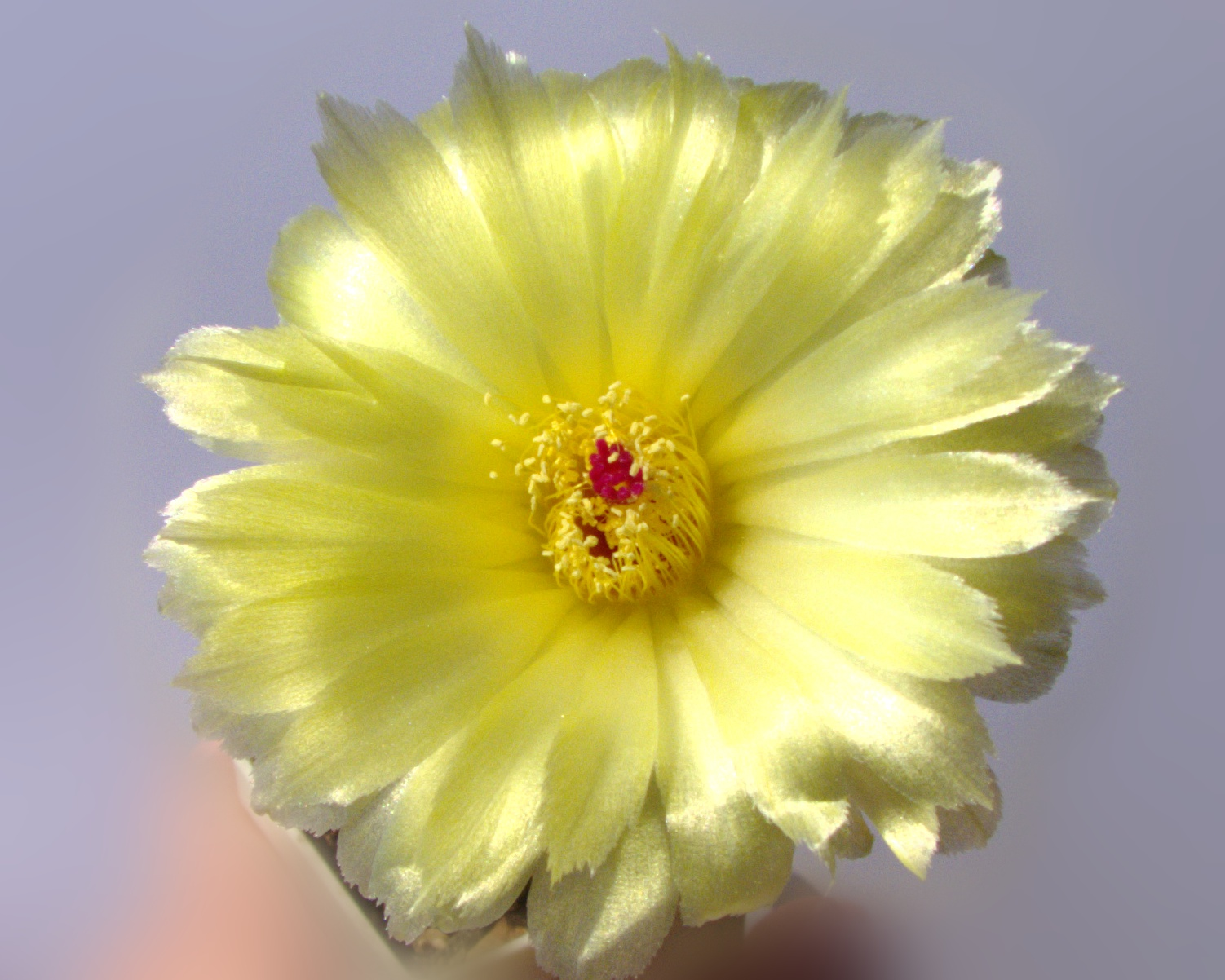
Flower closeup

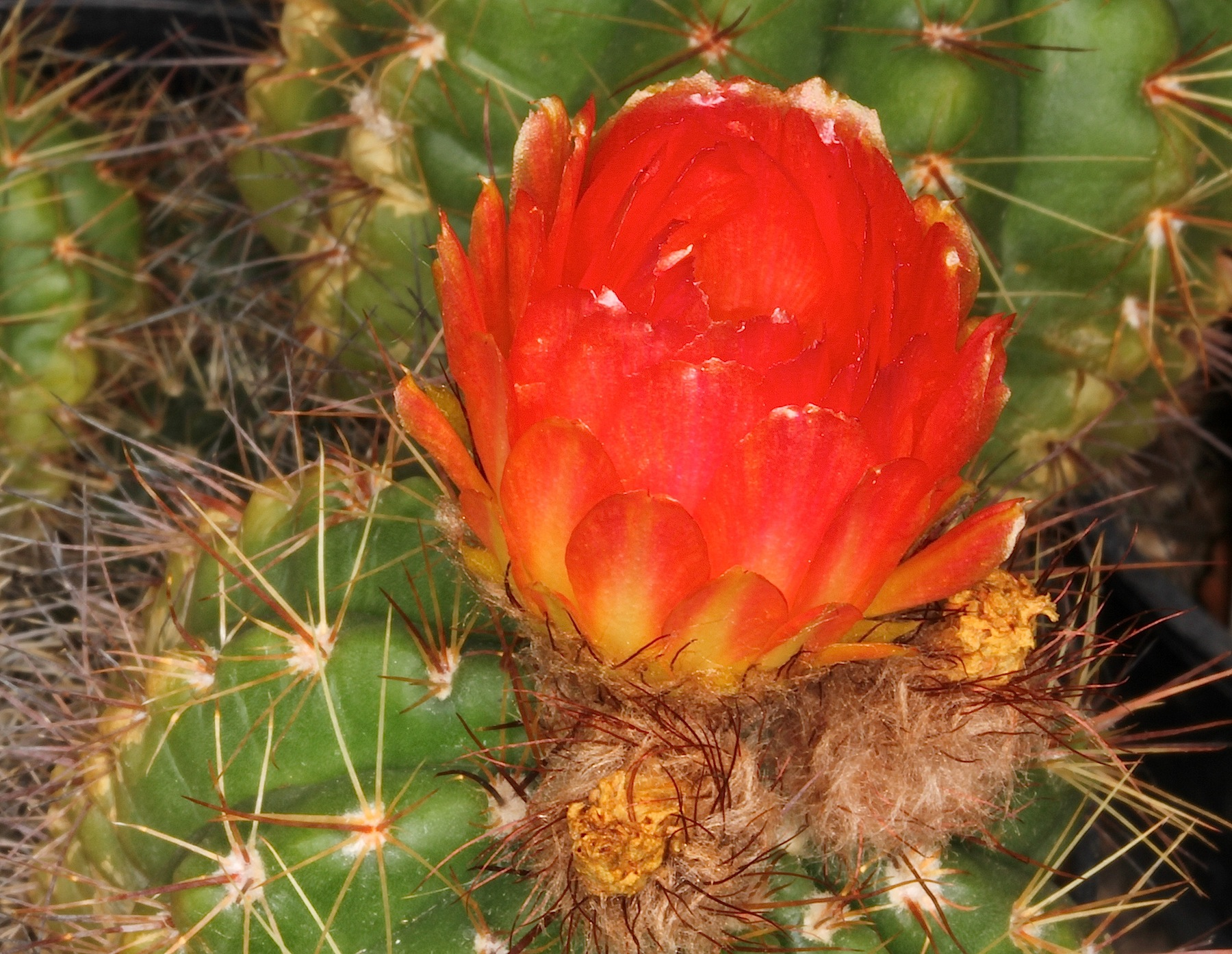
Side view of flower
