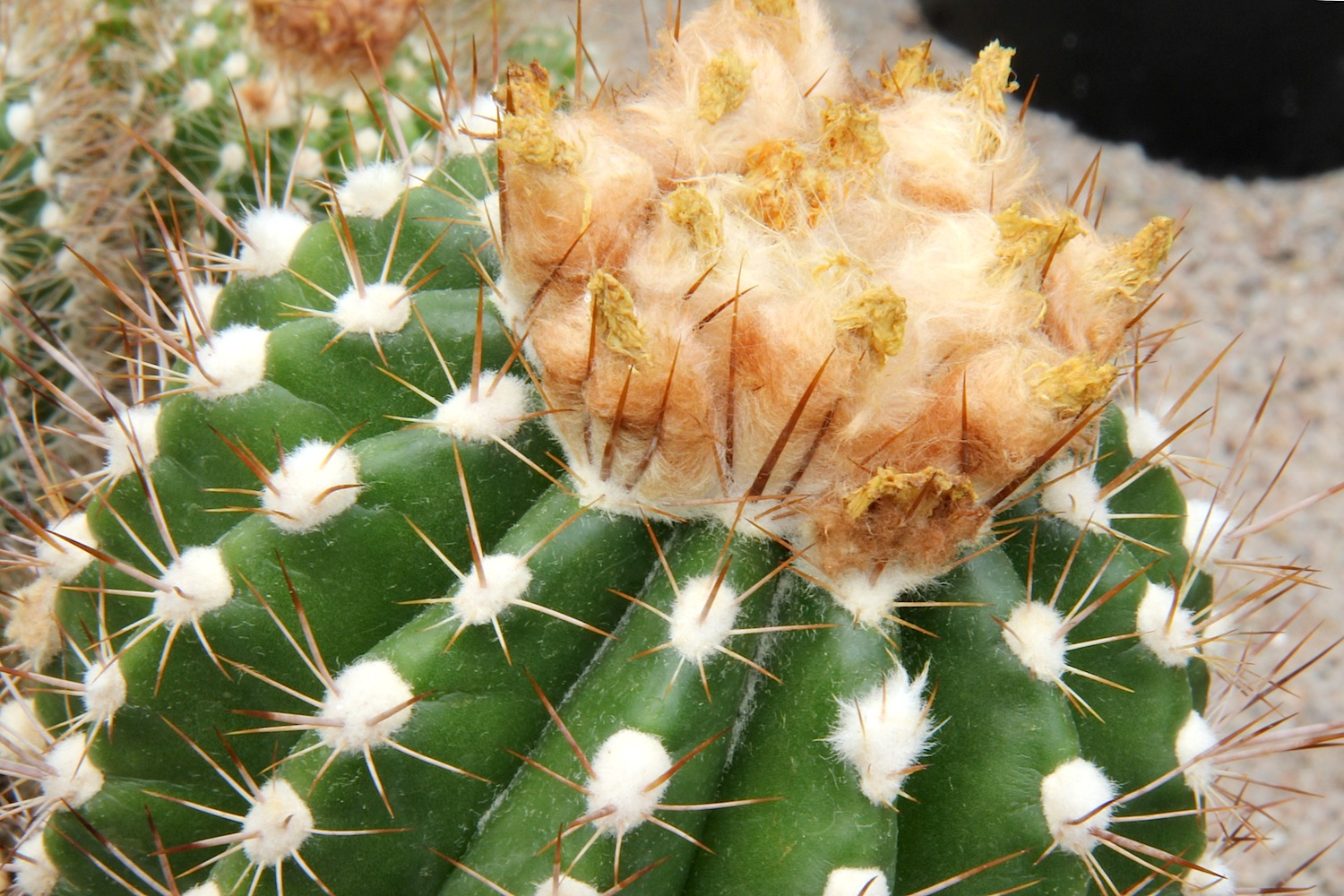

Conservation status
- Near Threatened (IUCN 3.1)

Scientific classification
- Kingdom: Plantae
- Clade: Tracheophytes
- Clade: Angiosperms
- Clade: Eudicots
- Order: Caryophyllales
- Family: Cactaceae
- Subfamily: Cactoideae
- Genus: Parodia
- Species: P. columnaris

Binomial name
- Parodia columnaris Cárdenas, 1951

Synonyms
- Parodia legitima F.H.Brandt

= Parodia columnaris =

Species of cactus

Parodia columnaris is a species of cactus in the subfamily Cactoideae. It is endemic to Bolivia. It was described in 1951 by Martín Cárdenas.
