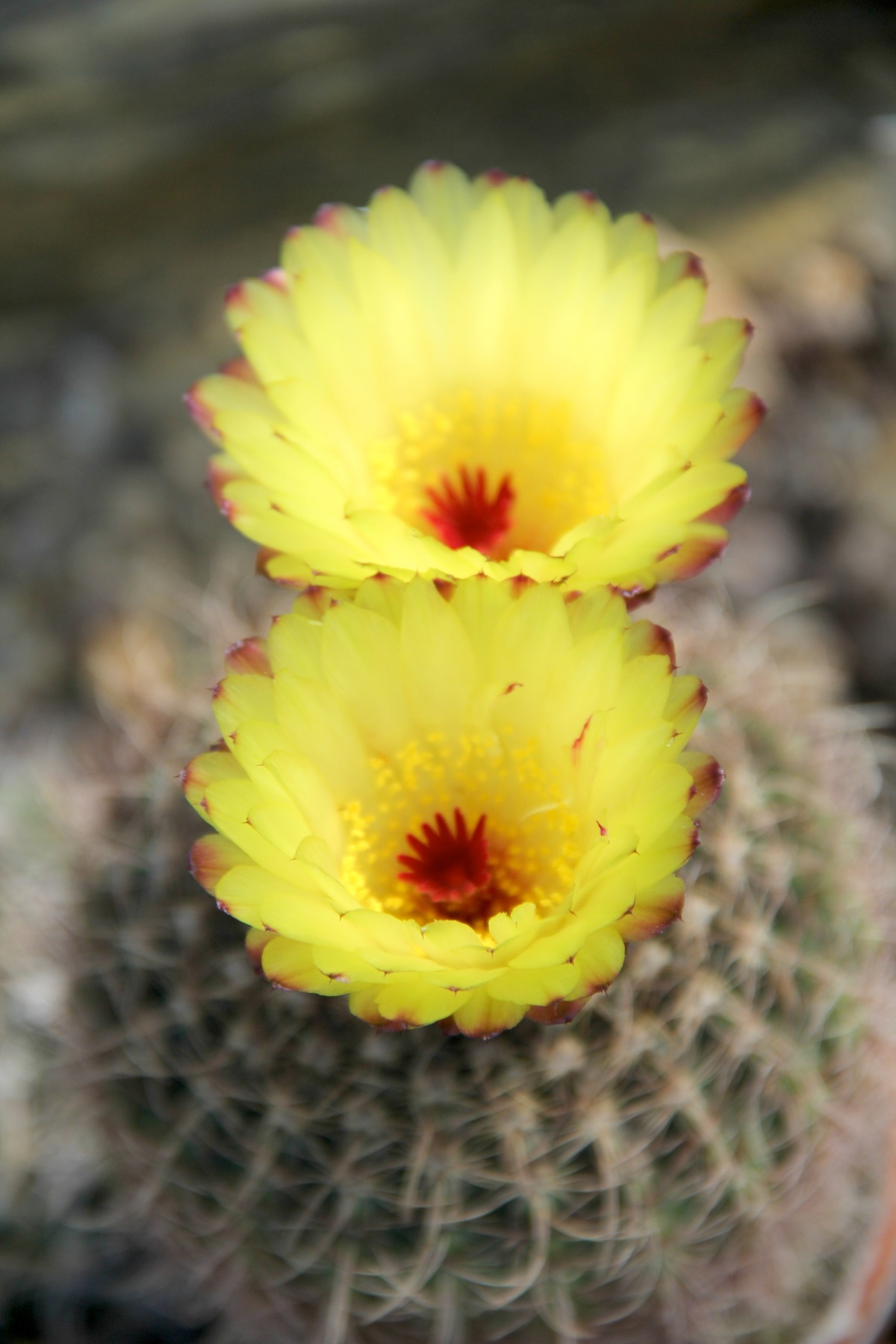
- Flowers
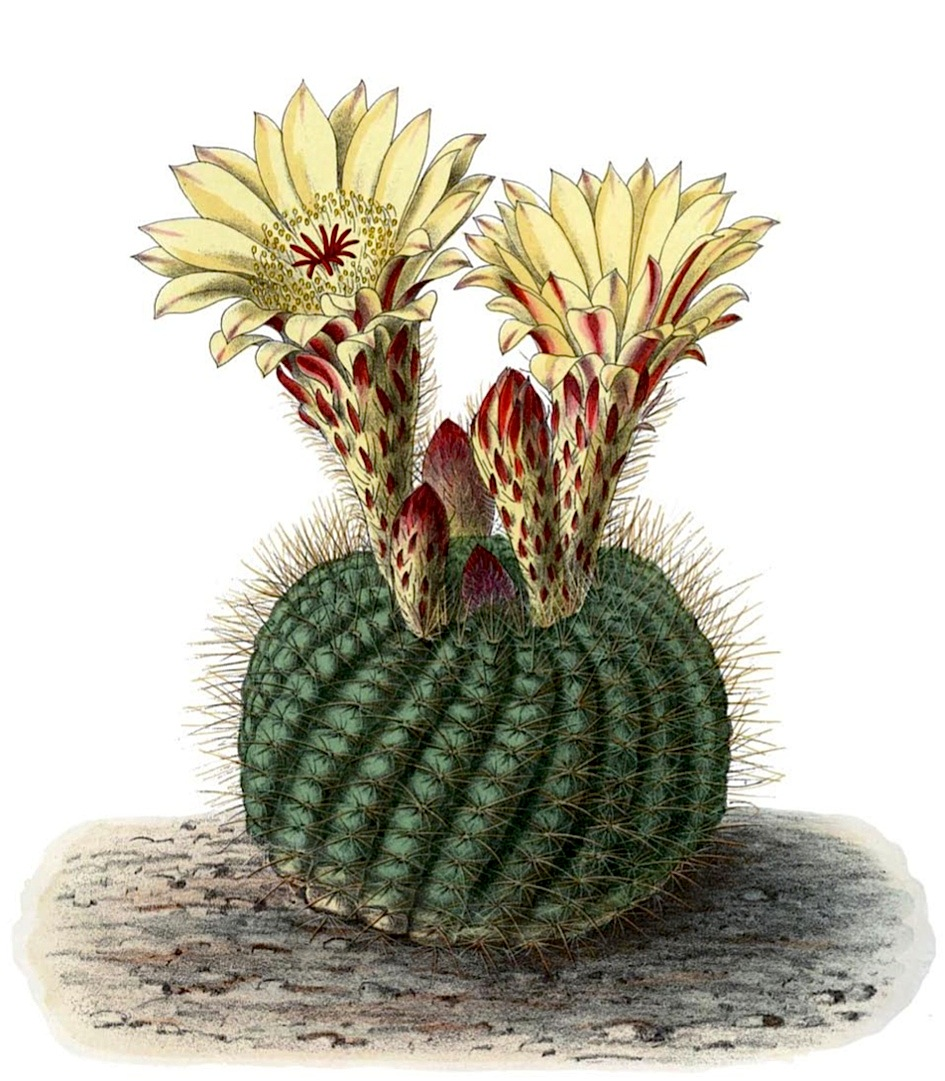
- Botanical illustration

Scientific classification
- Kingdom: Plantae
- Clade: Embryophytes
- Clade: Tracheophytes
- Clade: Angiosperms
- Clade: Eudicots
- Order: Caryophyllales
- Family: Cactaceae
- Subfamily: Cactoideae
- Genus: Parodia
- Species: P. concinna

Binomial name
- Parodia concinna (Monv.) N.P.Taylor

Synonyms
- List: Astrophytum caespitosum (Britton & Rose) Halda & Malina; Echinocactus apricus Arechav.; Echinocactus caespitosus Speg.; Echinocactus concinnus Monv.; Echinocactus concinnus var. joadii (Hook.f.) Arechav.; Echinocactus concinnus var. tabularis Cels ex Rümpler; Echinocactus joadii Hook.f.; Echinocactus tabularis (Cels ex Rümpler) Cels ex K.Schum.; Frailea caespitosa (Speg.) Britton & Rose; Malacocarpus apricus (Arechav.) Britton & Rose; Malacocarpus caespitosus (Speg.) Hosseus; Malacocarpus concinnus (Monv.) Britton & Rose; Malacocarpus tabularis (Cels ex Rümpler) Britton & Rose; Notocactus agnetae Vliet; Notocactus agnetae var. aureispinus Vliet; Notocactus agnetae var. minor Vliet; Notocactus apricus (Arechav.) A.Berger; Notocactus apricus var. concinnus (Monv.) Y.Itô; Notocactus apricus var. tabularis (Cels ex Rümpler) Y.Itô; Notocactus blaauwianus Vliet; Notocactus blaauwianus var. enormis Vliet; Notocactus bommeljei Vliet; Notocactus brederooianus Prestlé; Notocactus caespitosus (Speg.) Backeb.; Notocactus concinnioides W.Prauser; Notocactus concinnus (Monv.) A.Berger; Notocactus concinnus var. aceguensis N.Gerloff; Notocactus concinnus f. agnetae (Vliet) N.Gerloff & Neduchal; Notocactus concinnus subsp. agnetae (Vliet) Doweld; Notocactus concinnus var. apricus (Arechav.) P.V.Heath; Notocactus concinnus var. caespitosus (Speg.) N.Gerloff & Neduchal; Notocactus concinnus var. eremiticus (F.Ritter) N.Gerloff; Notocactus concinnus var. gibberulus (Prestlé) N.Gerloff; Notocactus concinnus subsp. multicostatus (Buining & Brederoo) Doweld; Notocactus concinnus var. pororensis Dumon; Notocactus concinnus var. rubrigemmatus (W.R.Abraham) N.Gerloff; Notocactus concinnus var. tabularis (Cels ex Rümpler) P.V.Heath; Notocactus eremiticus F.Ritter; Notocactus gibberulus Prestlé; Notocactus joadii (Hook.f.) Herter; Notocactus multicostatus Buining & Brederoo; Notocactus multicostatus var. blaauwianus (Vliet) N.Gerloff & Neduchal; Notocactus olimarensis Prestlé; Notocactus rubrigemmatus W.R.Abraham; Notocactus tabularis (Cels ex Rümpler) A.Berger; Notocactus tabularis subsp. bommeljei (Vliet) Lodé; Notocactus tabularis f. bommeljei (Vliet) N.Gerloff & Neduchal; Notocactus tabularis subsp. muricatus (Doweld) Doweld; Notocactus tabularis var. setispinus W.Prauser; Parodia caespitosa (Speg.) N.P.Taylor; Parodia concinna subsp. agnetae (Vliet) Hofacker; Parodia concinna subsp. blaauwiana (Vliet) Hofacker; Parodia tabularis (Cels ex Rümpler) D.R.Hunt; Parodia tabularis subsp. bommeljei (Vliet) Hofacker; Peronocactus concinnus (Monv.) Doweld; Peronocactus concinnus subsp. agnetae (Vliet) Doweld; Peronocactus concinnus subsp. multicostatus (Buining & Brederoo) Doweld; Peronocactus tabularis (Cels ex Rümpler) Doweld; Peronocactus tabularis subsp. muricatus Doweld

= Parodia concinna =

Species of cactus

Parodia concinna, the sun cup, is a species of cactus in the genus Parodia, native to southern Brazil and Uruguay. It has gained the Royal Horticultural Society's Award of Garden Merit.

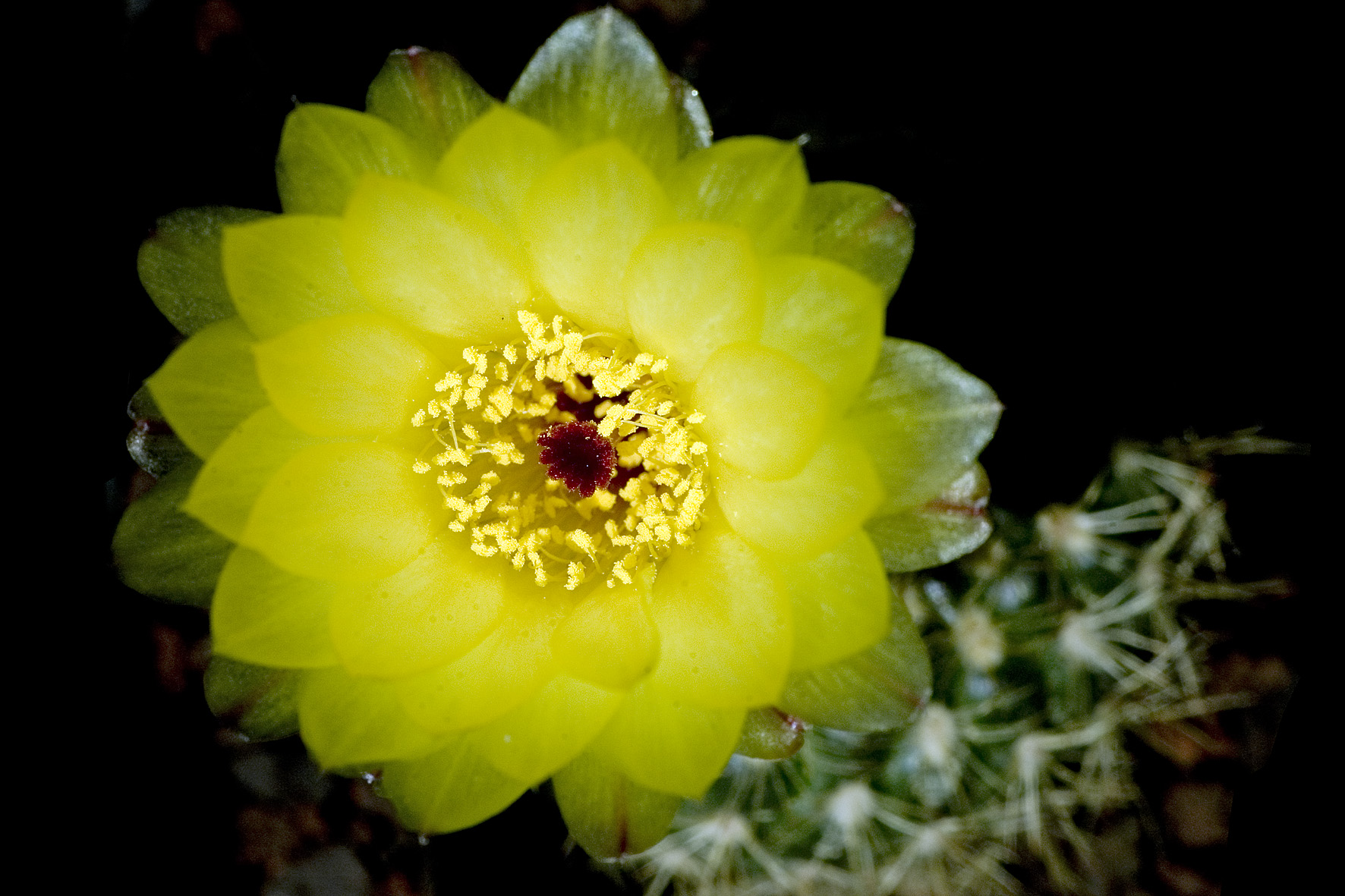
Close-up of flower

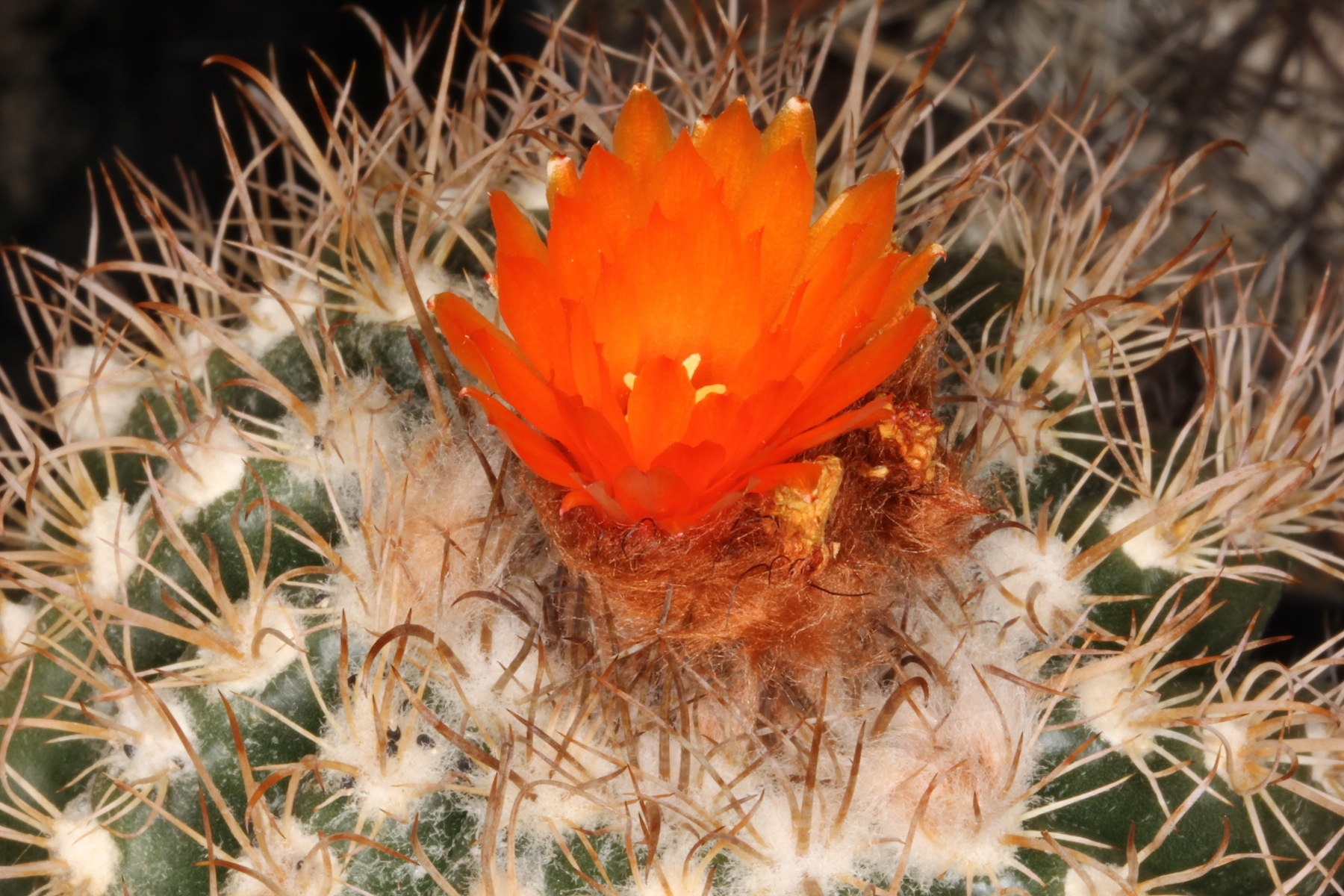
Parodia concinna "subspecies blaauwiana", which is no longer accepted

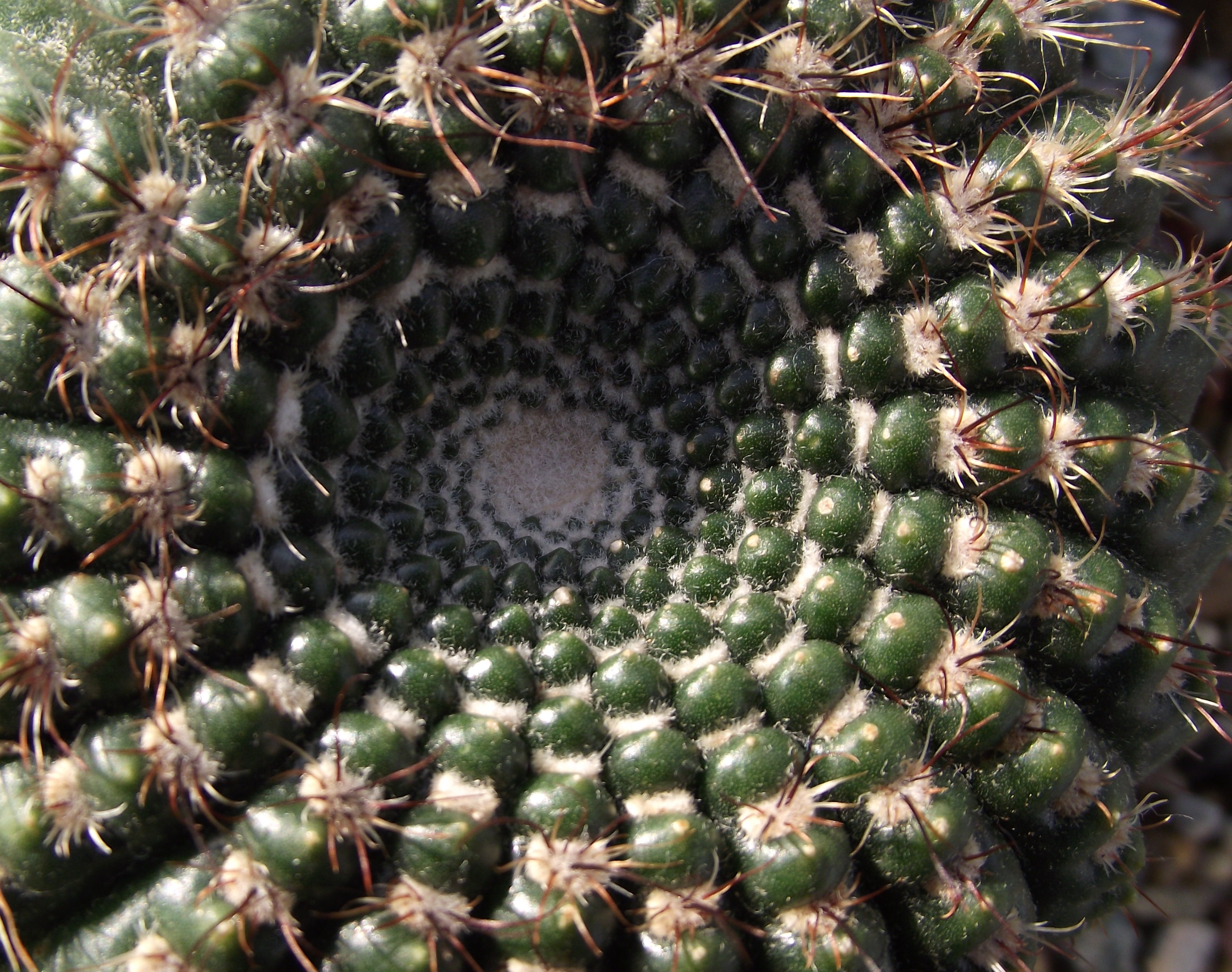
Crown
