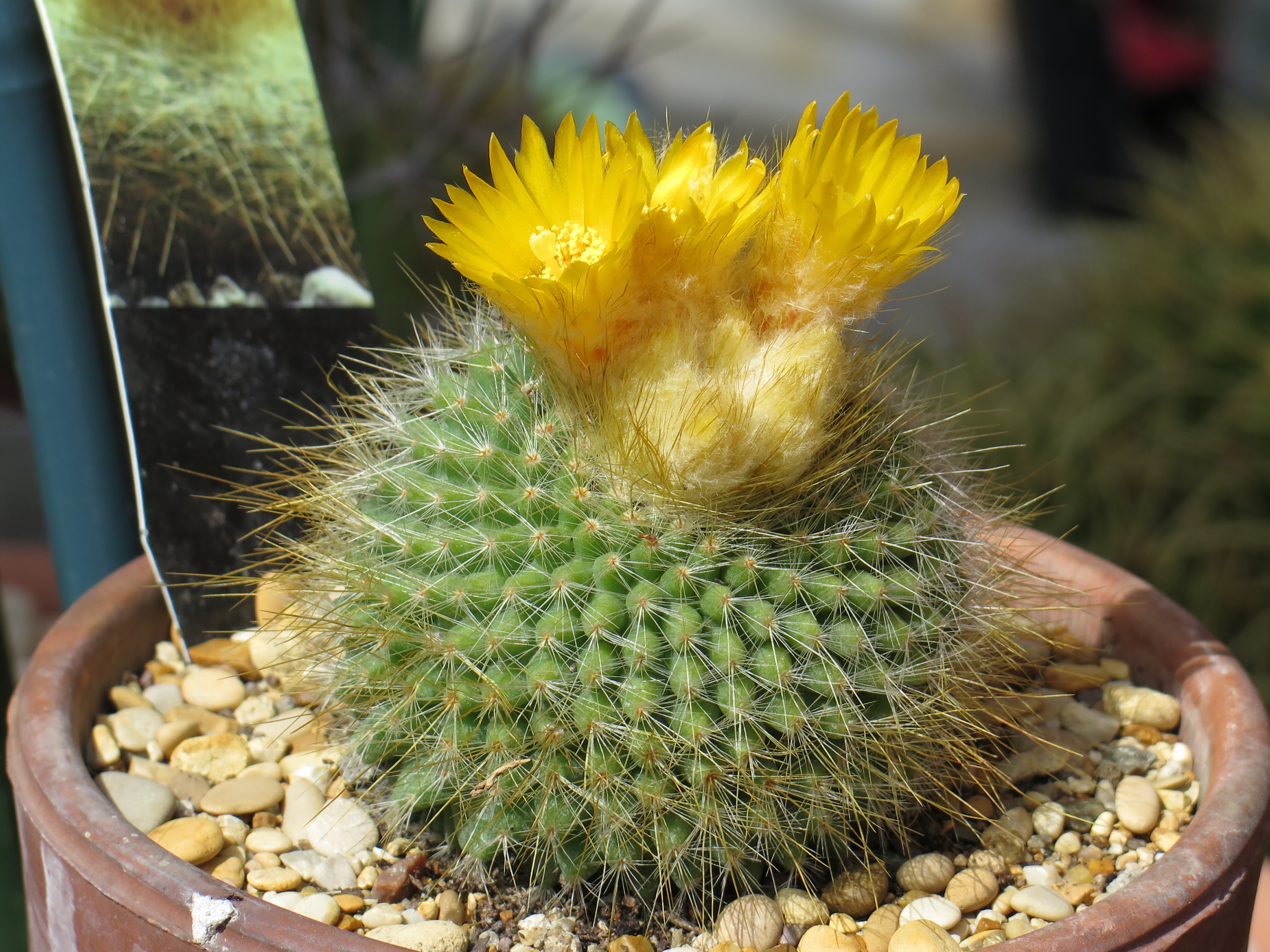
- In bloom
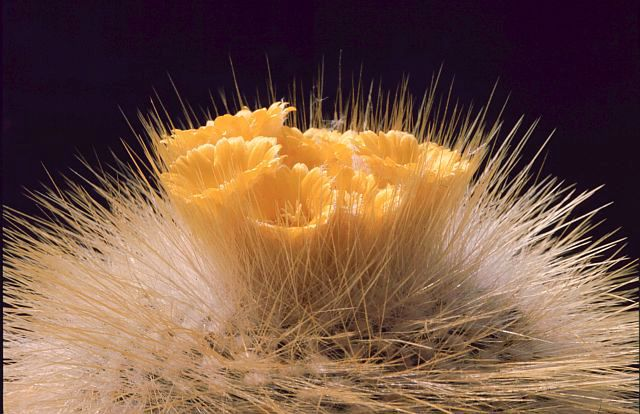
- A puffier specimen

Scientific classification
- Kingdom: Plantae
- Clade: Embryophytes
- Clade: Tracheophytes
- Clade: Angiosperms
- Clade: Eudicots
- Order: Caryophyllales
- Family: Cactaceae
- Subfamily: Cactoideae
- Genus: Parodia
- Species: P. chrysacanthion

Binomial name
- Parodia chrysacanthion (K.Schum.) Backeb.

Synonyms
- List: Bolivicactus saint-pieanus (Backeb.) Doweld; Echinocactus chrysacanthion K.Schum.; Gymnocalycium chrysacanthion (K.Schum.) H.Blossf.; Parodia saint-pieana Backeb.

= Parodia chrysacanthion =

Species of cactus

Parodia chrysacanthion, the golden powder puff, is a species of cactus in the genus Parodia, native to northwest Argentina. It has gained the Royal Horticultural Society's Award of Garden Merit.
