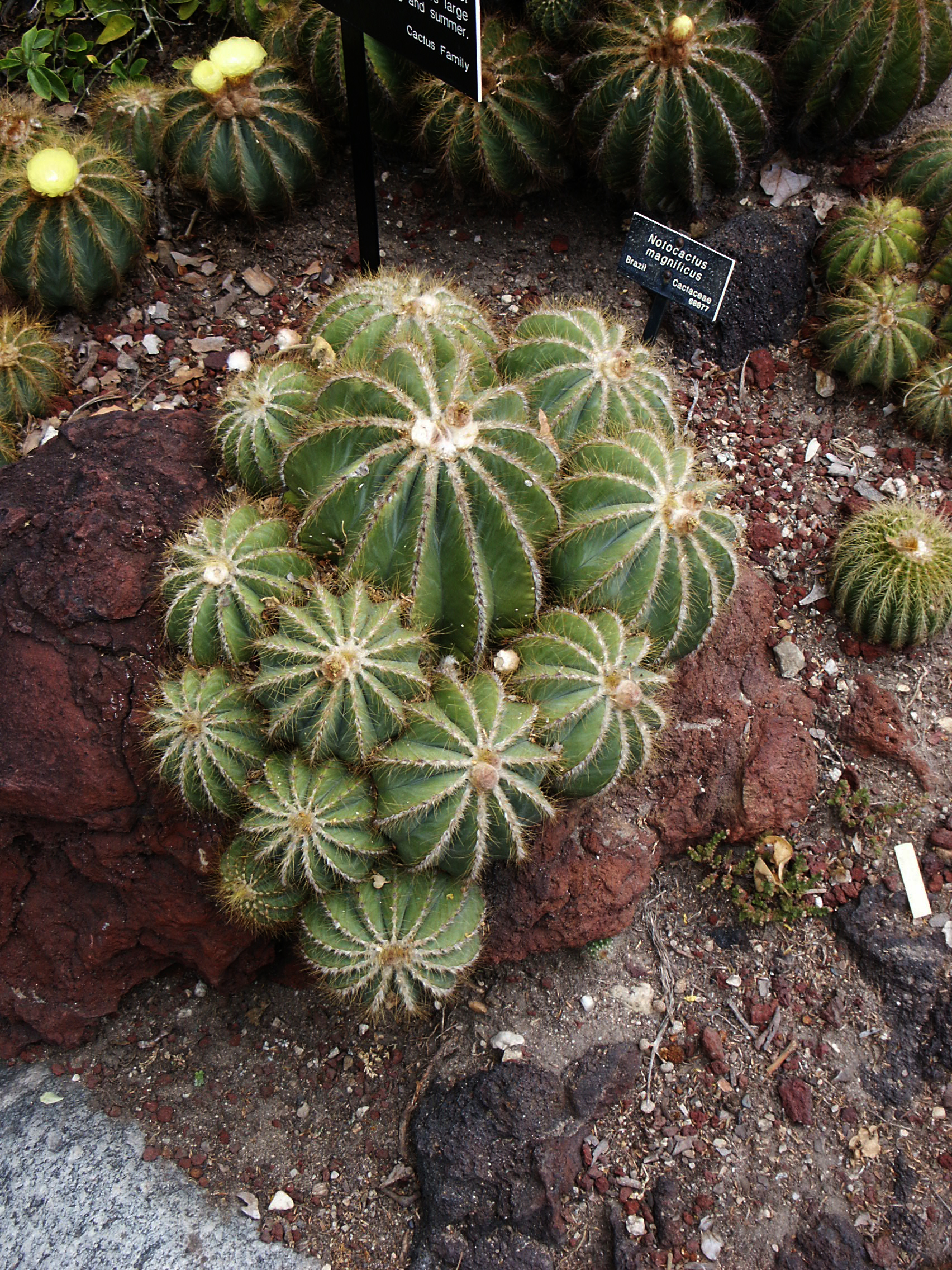
- Parodia magnifica, Huntington Desert Garden

Scientific classification
- Kingdom: Plantae
- Clade: Tracheophytes
- Clade: Angiosperms
- Clade: Eudicots
- Order: Caryophyllales
- Family: Cactaceae
- Subfamily: Cactoideae
- Tribe: Notocacteae
- Genus: Parodia; Speg.

Type species
- Parodia microsperma

Synonyms
- Hickenia Britton & Rose 1922; Microspermia Frič 1929); Neohickenia Frič 1928; Acanthocephala Backeb. 1938; Bolivicactus Doweld 2000; Brasilicactus Backeb. 1942; Brasiliparodia F.Ritter 1979; Brasilocactus Frič ex Kreuz. 1935; Chrysocactus Y.Itô 1950; Dactylanthocactus Y.Itô 1957; Eriocactus Backeb. 1942; Eriocephala Backeb. 1938; Malacocarpus Salm-Dyck 1850; Notocactus (K.Schum.) Frič 1928; Peronocactus Doweld 1999; Ritterocactus Doweld 1999; Sericocactus Y.Itô 1957; Wigginsia D.M.Porter 1964

= Parodia =

Genus of cacti

Parodia is a genus of flowering plants in the family Cactaceae, native to the eastern slopes of the Andes in northwestern Argentina and southwestern Bolivia and in the lowland pampas regions of northeastern Argentina, southern Brazil, eastern Paraguay, and Uruguay. This genus has about 65 species, many of which have been transferred from Eriocactus, Notocactus and Wigginsia. They range from small globose plants to 1 m (3 ft) tall columnar cacti. All are deeply ribbed and spiny, with single flowers at or near the crown. Some species produce offsets at the base. They are popular in cultivation, but must be grown indoors where temperatures fall below 10 °C (50 °F).

== Taxonomy and systematics ==
The first description was published in 1923 by the Italian-Argentinian botanist Carlos Luis Spegazzini. The genus is named after Domingo Parodi, one of the early investigators of the flora of Paraguay. The type species is Echinocactus microspermus. Anatomical and morphological work by David Richard Hunt et al. and Reto Nyffeler led to the incorporation of the genera Brasilicactus, Brasiliparodia, Eriocactus, Notocactus and Wigginsia into the genus Parodia. These studies also suggested the inclusion of the genera Blossfeldia and Frailea.

According to Reto Nyffeler, the genus Parodia can be divided into three subgenera:

- Subgenus Parodia:
  - Group Parodia: (Parodia s. str.)
    The shoots are flat spherical, globular or columnar and rarely sprout. A tuber is rarely present. The shoot tissue usually contains no mucilage, the epidermis is usually tender. The areoles are always on the protuberances. The central and radial spines differ significantly from each other. The central spine is sometimes hooked. The flowers are funnel-shaped, styles and stigmas are always the same color. The soft fruits later dry up and open at their base.
  - Group Notocactus: (Notocactus s.str. + Wigginsia)
    The shoots are flat spherical, globular or columnar and occasionally sprout. A tuber is sometimes present. The shoot tissue usually contains mucus, the epidermis is often hard. The areoles are located in the depressions between the bumps. The central and radial spines differ. The flowers are broadly funnel-shaped to bell-shaped, styles and stigmas are usually differently colored. The fruits, which are often elongated when ripe, open differently.
- Subgenus Eriocactus:
  The shoots are often long columnar in old age and occasionally sprout. The shoot apex is often crooked. The instinctual tissue contains no mucus. The humps are fused into straight ribs. The areoles are located between the protuberances. They are not sunken or only vaguely sunken and are often heavily woolly. The thorns are more or less bristle-like. The light to dark yellow flowers are broadly bell-shaped, styles and stigmas are the same color. The fruits have a hard pericarp and open at the base.

=== Species ===
Species of the genus Parodia according to Plants of the World Online As of January 2023 separated into sections according to Reto Nyffeler:

Subgenus	Section	Image	Scientific name	Distribution
Parodia	Parodia		Parodia aureicentra Backeb.	Argentina (Salta)
Parodia	Parodia		Parodia ayopayana Cárdenas	Bolivia.
Parodia	Parodia		Parodia chrysacanthion (K.Schum.) Backeb.	Argentina (Jujuy)
Parodia	Parodia		Parodia columnaris Cárdenas	Bolivia.
Parodia	Parodia		Parodia comarapana Cárdenas	Bolivia.
Parodia	Parodia		Parodia diersiana Jucker	Bolivia.
Parodia	Parodia		Parodia commutans F.Ritter	Bolivia
Parodia	Parodia		Parodia formosa F.Ritter	Bolivia
Parodia	Parodia		Parodia gibbulosoides F.H.Brandt	Bolivia.
Parodia	Parodia		Parodia hausteiniana Rausch	Bolivia
Parodia	Parodia		Parodia hegeri Diers, Krahn & Beckert	Bolivia
Parodia	Parodia		Parodia horrida F.H.Brandt	Argentina (Salta)
Parodia	Parodia		Parodia larapuntensis Diers & Jucker	Bolivia (Chuquisaca)
Parodia	Parodia		Parodia maassii (Heese) A.Berger	Bolivia to Argentina (Jujuy)
Parodia	Parodia		Parodia mairanana Cárdenas	Bolivia (Santa Cruz).
Parodia	Parodia		Parodia microsperma (F.A.C.Weber) Speg.	Bolivia to NW. Argentina
Parodia	Parodia		Parodia nivosa Backeb.	Argentina (Salta)
Parodia	Parodia		Parodia ocampoi Cárdenas	Bolivia
Parodia	Parodia		Parodia otaviana Cárdenas	Bolivia.
Parodia	Parodia		Parodia prestoensis F.H.Brandt	Bolivia.
Parodia	Parodia		Parodia procera F.Ritter	Bolivia
Parodia	Parodia		Parodia ritteri Buining	Bolivia.
Parodia	Parodia		Parodia schwebsiana (Werderm.) Backeb.	Bolivia
Parodia	Parodia		Parodia stuemeri (Werderm.) Backeb.	Argentina (Jujuy, Salta)
Parodia	Parodia		Parodia subterranea F.Ritter	Bolivia
Parodia	Parodia		Parodia taratensis Cárdenas	Bolivia
Parodia	Parodia		Parodia tuberculata Cárdenas	Bolivia.
Parodia	Notocactus		Parodia allosiphon (Marchesi) N.P.Taylor	Brazil (Rio Grande do Sul) to Uruguay
Parodia	Notocactus		Parodia buiningii (Buxb.) N.P.Taylor	Brazil (Rio Grande do Sul) to Uruguay
Parodia	Notocactus		Parodia calvescens (N.Gerloff & A.D.Nilson) Anceschi & Magli	Brazil (Rio Grande do Sul) to Argentina (Corrientes)
Parodia	Notocactus		Parodia claviceps (F.Ritter) F.H.Brandt	Brazil (Rio Grande do Sul) to Argentina (Misiones).
Parodia	Notocactus		Parodia carambeiensis (Buining & Brederoo) Hofacker	Brazil (Paraná)
Parodia	Notocactus		Parodia concinna (Monv.) N.P.Taylor	Brazil (Rio Grande do Sul) to Uruguay
Parodia	Notocactus		Parodia crassigibba (F.Ritter) N.P.Taylor	Brazil (Rio Grande do Sul)
Parodia	Notocactus		Parodia curvispina (F.Ritter) D.R.Hunt	Brazil (Rio Grande do Sul)
Parodia	Notocactus		Parodia erinaceus (Haw.) N.P.Taylor	Central Colombia, Brazil (Rio Grande do Sul) to NE. & S. Central Argentina
Parodia	Notocactus		Parodia × erubescens (Osten) D.R.Hunt (P. mammulosa x P. concinna)	Uruguay
Parodia	Notocactus		Parodia fusca (F.Ritter) Hofacker & P.J.Braun	S. Brazil.
Parodia	Notocactus		Parodia gaucha M.Machado & Larocca	Brazil (Rio Grande do Sul).
Parodia	Notocactus		Parodia herteri (Werderm.) N.P.Taylor	Brazil (Rio Grande do Sul) to Uruguay.
Parodia	Notocactus		Parodia horstii (F.Ritter) N.P.Taylor	Brazil (Rio Grande do Sul).
Parodia	Notocactus		Parodia ibicuiensis (Prestlé) Anceschi & Magli	Brazil (Rio Grande do Sul ).
Parodia	Notocactus		Parodia langsdorfii (Lehm.) D.R.Hunt	S. Brazil.
Parodia	Notocactus		Parodia linkii (Lehm.) R.Kiesling	S. Brazil to NE. Argentina
Parodia	Notocactus		Parodia mammulosa (Lem.) N.P.Taylor	Brazil (Rio Grande do Sul) to Argentina
Parodia	Notocactus		Parodia mueller-melchersii (Frič ex Backeb.) N.P.Taylor	Brazil (Rio Grande do Sul) to Uruguay
Parodia	Notocactus		Parodia muricata (Link & Otto ex Pfeiff.) Hofacker	S. Brazil.
Parodia	Notocactus		Parodia neoarechavaletae (Havlíček) D.R.Hunt	Uruguay.
Parodia	Notocactus		Parodia neobuenekeri (F.Ritter) Anceschi & Magli	Brazil.
Parodia	Notocactus		Parodia neohorstii N.P.Taylor	Brazil (Rio Grande do Sul)
Parodia	Notocactus		Parodia nothorauschii D.R.Hunt	Uruguay
Parodia	Notocactus		Parodia ottonis (Lehm.) N.P.Taylor	S. Brazil to NE. Argentina.
Parodia	Notocactus		Parodia oxycostata (Buining & Brederoo) Hofacker	Brazil (Rio Grande do Sul).
Parodia	Notocactus		Parodia roseolutea (Vliet) Hofacker, A.S.Oliveira & R.Pontes	Uruguay.
Parodia	Notocactus		Parodia scopa (Spreng.) N.P.Taylor	Brazil (Rio Grande do Sul) to Uruguay
Parodia	Notocactus		Parodia stockingeri (Prestlé) Hofacker & P.J.Braun	Brazil (Rio Grande do Sul).
Parodia	Notocactus		Parodia tenuicylindrica (F.Ritter) D.R.Hunt	Brazil (Rio Grande do Sul)
Parodia	Notocactus		Parodia werdermanniana (Herter) N.P.Taylor	Brazil (Rio Grande do Sul) to Uruguay
Eriocactus (Buxb.) F.H.Brandt			Parodia leninghausii (F.Haage) F.H.Brandt ex Eggli & Hofacker	Brazil (Rio Grande do Sul)
Eriocactus (Buxb.) F.H.Brandt			Parodia magnifica (F.Ritter) F.H.Brandt	Brazil (Rio Grande do Sul)
Eriocactus (Buxb.) F.H.Brandt			Parodia nigrispina (K.Schum.) F.H.Brandt	Paraguay
Eriocactus (Buxb.) F.H.Brandt			Parodia schumanniana (Nicolai) F.H.Brandt	Brazil (Rio Grande do Sul) to Argentina (Misiones)
Eriocactus (Buxb.) F.H.Brandt			Parodia warasii (F.Ritter) F.H.Brandt	Brazil (Rio Grande do Sul)
Brasilicactus (Buxb.) F.H.Brandt			Parodia alacriportana Backeb. & Voll	Brazil
Brasilicactus (Buxb.) F.H.Brandt			Parodia haselbergii (Haage ex Rümpler) F.H.Brandt	Brazil (Rio Grande do Sul)
Brasilicactus (Buxb.) F.H.Brandt			Parodia rechensis (Buining) F.H.Brandt	Brazil (Rio Grande do Sul)

=== Synonyms ===
- Acanthocephala Backeb.
- Brasilicactus Backeb.
- Brasiliparodia F.Ritter
- Brasilocactus Fric (nom. inval.)
- Chrysocactus Y.Itô (nom. inval.)
- Dactylanthocactus Y.Itô
- Eriocactus Backeb.
- Eriocephala Backeb.
- Friesia Fric (nom. inval.)
- Hickenia Britton & Rose
- Jauhisoparodia Blackhat
- Malacocarpus Salm-Dyck
- Microspermia Fric
- Neohickenia Fric
- Notocactus (K.Schum.) Fric
- Sericocactus Y.Itô
- Wigginsia D.M.Porter

== Bibliography ==
- Anderson, Edward F. (2001). The Cactus Family. Pentland, Oregon: Timber Press. ISBN 978-0-88192-498-5.
- Innes, Clive (1995). "Cacti". In Innes, Clive & Wall, Bill (eds.). Cacti, Succulents and Bromeliads. London: Cassell for the Royal Horticultural Society. pp. 11–70. ISBN 978-0-304-32076-9.
- Media related to Parodia at Wikimedia Commons
