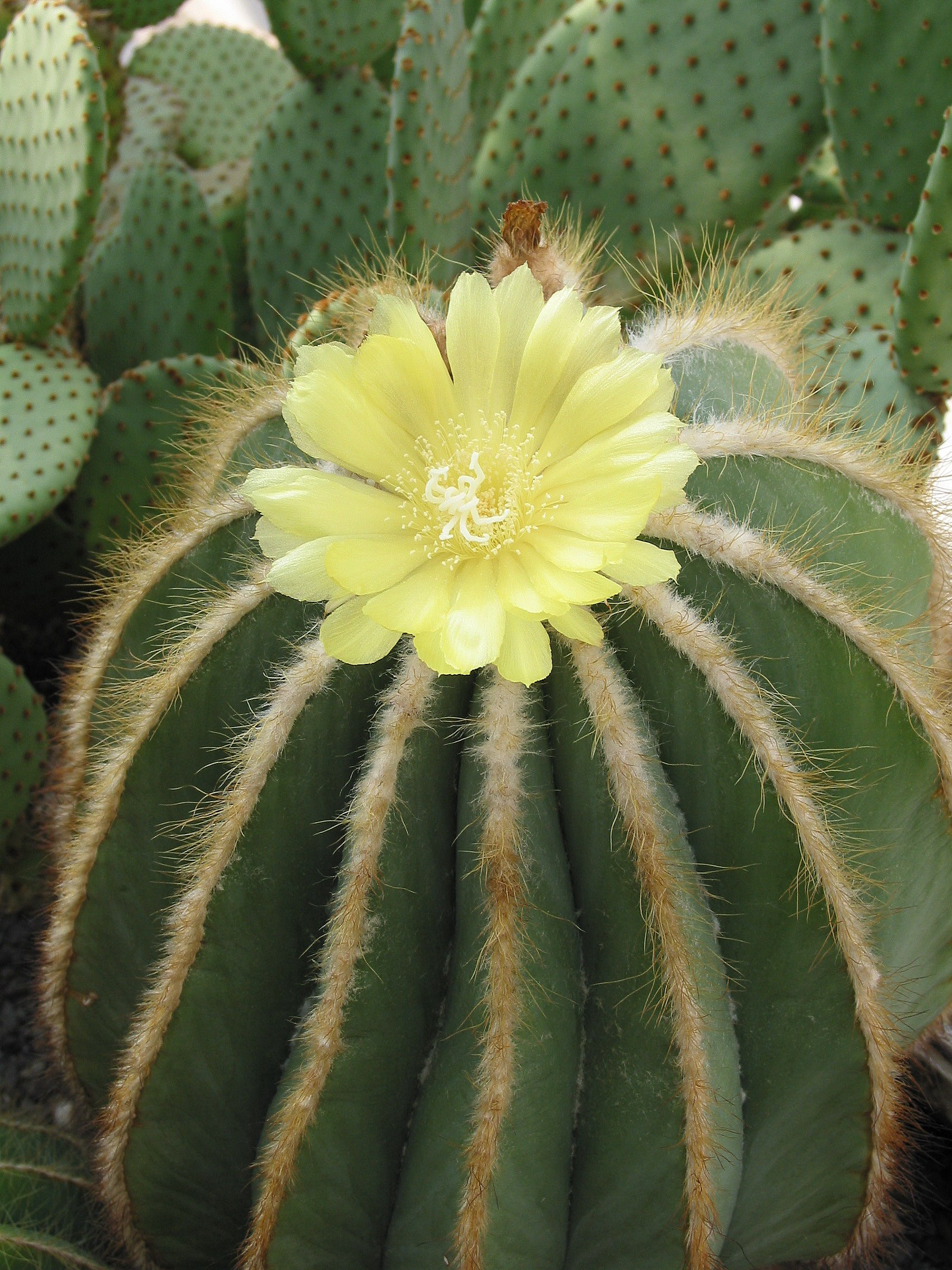

Conservation status
- Endangered (IUCN 3.1)

Scientific classification
- Kingdom: Plantae
- Clade: Tracheophytes
- Clade: Angiosperms
- Clade: Eudicots
- Order: Caryophyllales
- Family: Cactaceae
- Subfamily: Cactoideae
- Genus: Parodia
- Species: P. magnifica

Binomial name
- Parodia magnifica (F.Ritter) F.H.Brandt

= Parodia magnifica =

Species of cactus

Parodia magnifica is a species of flowering plant in the family Cactaceae, native to southern Brazil. One of several species called ball cactus, it is also called balloon cactus. It grows to 7–15 cm (3–6 in) tall by 45 cm (18 in) broad, with heavily ribbed, spherical to columnar, spiny and hairy stems, bearing pale yellow flowers in summer. Its natural habitat is cool, dry temperate grassland at elevations of up to 800 m (2,600 ft). Populations are sparse and fragmented, and it has been designated as "Endangered" by the IUCN Red List.

In cultivation it must be kept above 10 °C (50 °F), so in temperate regions is grown under glass. It has gained the Royal Horticultural Society's Award of Garden Merit.

== Synonyms ==
- Notocactus magnificus
- Eriocactus magnificus

The plant may still be found listed under these synonyms in the horticultural literature.
