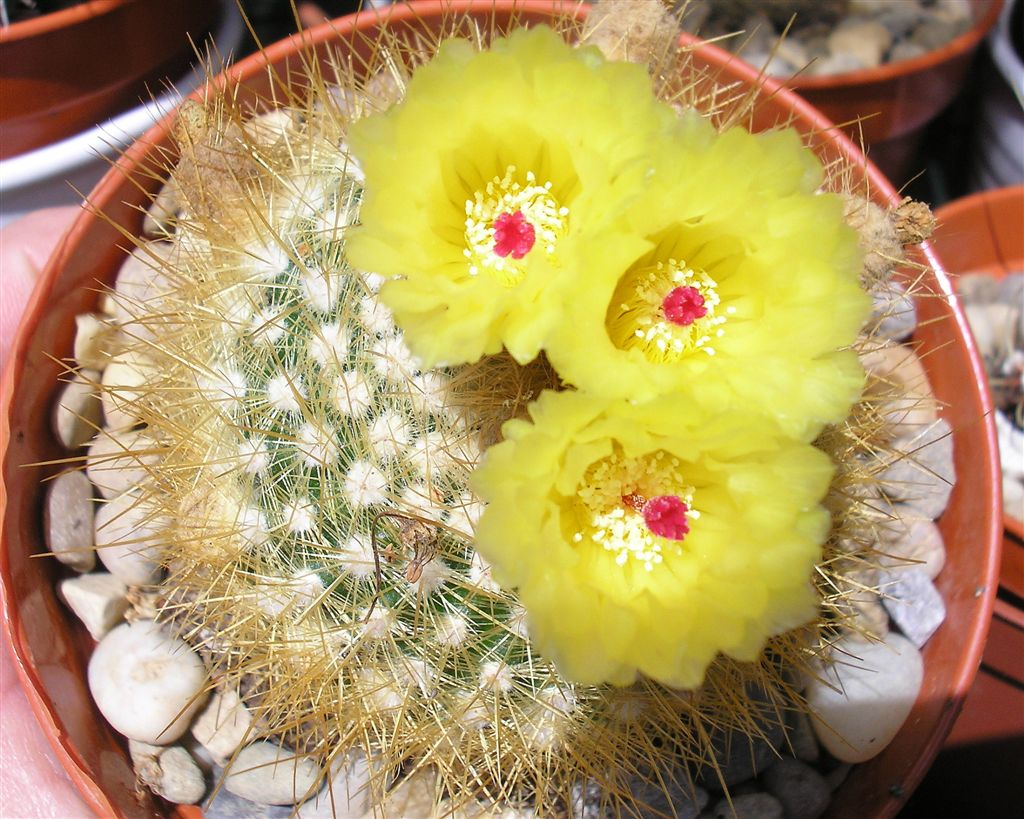

Scientific classification
- Kingdom: Plantae
- Clade: Tracheophytes
- Clade: Angiosperms
- Clade: Eudicots
- Order: Caryophyllales
- Family: Cactaceae
- Subfamily: Cactoideae
- Genus: Parodia
- Species: P. scopa

Binomial name
- Parodia scopa (Spreng.) N.P.Taylor

= Parodia scopa =

Species of cactus

Parodia scopa (syn. Notocactus scopa), the silver ball cactus, is a species of flowering plant in the cactus family Cactaceae, native to upland southern Brazil and Uruguay. It is a ball- or cylinder-shaped cactus growing to 5–50 cm (2–20 in) tall by 10 cm (4 in) broad, with a spiny, woolly crown and pale yellow flowers in summer.

The specific epithet scopa means "broom" and refers to the long spines. The species was transferred from Notocactus to Parodia in 1997 by David Hunt.

In cultivation it requires a minimum temperature of 10 °C (50 °F), therefore in temperate regions it must be grown under glass or as a houseplant.

The subspecies P. scopa subsp. scopa has gained the Royal Horticultural Society's Award of Garden Merit.
