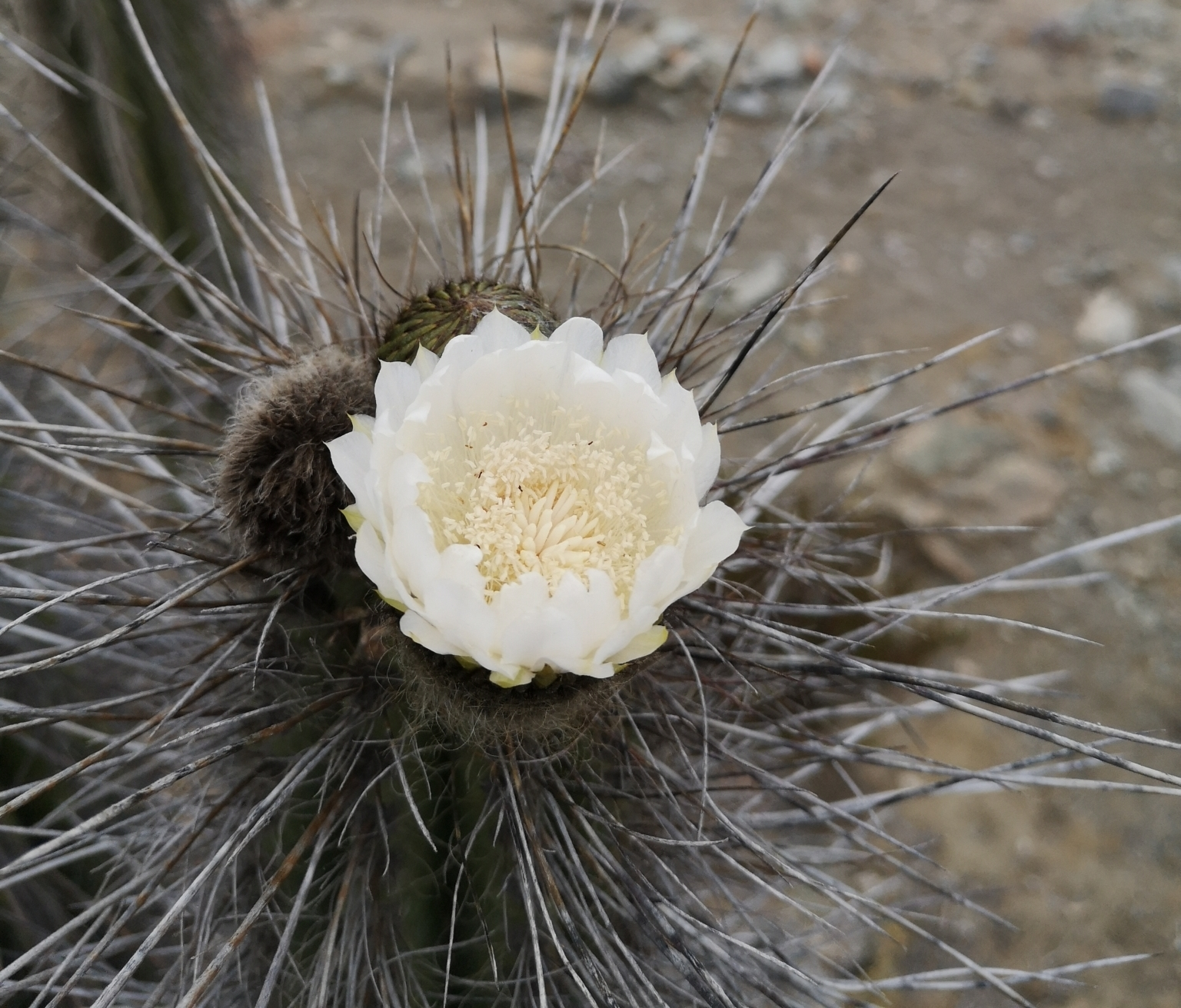

Scientific classification
- Kingdom: Plantae
- Clade: Tracheophytes
- Clade: Angiosperms
- Clade: Eudicots
- Order: Caryophyllales
- Family: Cactaceae
- Subfamily: Cactoideae
- Genus: Eulychnia
- Species: E. taltalensis

Binomial name
- Eulychnia taltalensis (F.Ritter) Hoxey 2011

Synonyms
- Eulychnia breviflora var. taltalensis F.Ritter 1980; Eulychnia iquiquensis subsp. taltalensis (F.Ritter) Guiggi 2020

= Eulychnia taltalensis =

Species of cactus

Eulychnia taltalensis is a species of Eulychnia found in Chile.

== Description ==
Eulychnia taltalensis is a tree-like cactus that grows upright, reaching heights of 3 to 5 meters. It typically branches profusely from its base without forming a distinct trunk, with larger specimens boasting 30 to 50 branches. The stems are grass-green, measuring 6 to 10 cm in diameter and up to 4 meters in length. These stems feature 9 to 14 rounded ribs, about 1.2 to 2 cm high, and areoles spaced roughly 2 cm apart, with a diameter of 0.8 to 1.4 cm. Young areoles are covered in dark brown felt, which may sometimes appear gray and eventually lightens to light gray with age. On sterile stems, spines consist of 3 to 5 robust, straight central spines, about 2 mm thick at the base, growing up to 8 cm long and typically pointing downwards. These brown spines turn gray as they age. Additionally, 6 to 12 short, radiating radial spines, 5 to 10 mm long, range in color from brown to gray. Flowering stems have similar central spines, 3 to 5 in number, but they are thinner, about 1 mm thick, and more flexible, reaching up to 12 cm in length. The radial spines on flowering stems are more numerous, ranging from 10 to 15, and are very thin, flexible, and noticeably longer, measuring up to 6 cm. The flowers, which usually appear near the stem tips and open during the day, are lightly fragrant and measure 5 to 6.5 cm long and 3.5 to 4 cm wide. The floral tube is thick and green, composed of large, mucilage-rich cells, and is covered in numerous green scales hidden by dense, dark brown hairs, occasionally with grayish or golden-yellow hues. The inner part of the floral tube surrounding the ovary is white. The white petals are 1.5 to 2 cm long and 5 to 9 mm wide, with rounded tips and a small terminal point. The thick, white style is 1.5 to 1.8 cm long and bears 19 to 24 pale yellow stigmatic lobes, 3 to 8 mm long. Very numerous white stamens completely fill the open flower, and their anthers are pale yellow. The globose fruit is about 6 cm in diameter, covered in woolly hairs similar to the flower, and has a sour taste. The fruit wall is thick and contains large cells filled with colorless mucilage. The black, matte seeds are approximately 1.5 mm long, 1.0 mm wide, and 0.4 mm thick.

Eulychnia taltalensis and Eulychnia iquiquensis share a similar general morphology, leading to taxonomic confusion. However, E. taltalensis possesses distinct characteristics for identification. A key feature is the differentiation of spines between juvenile and mature flowering stems; juvenile stems have strong, rigid spines, while mature stems have significantly reduced, weaker, and more flexible spines, sometimes appearing almost hairy. This spine dimorphism is also present in Eulychnia iquiquensis and Eulychnia ritteri, but not in other Eulychnia species. E. taltalensis can be further differentiated from E. iquiquensis by the presence of dark brown felt within the areoles and the complete absence of wool or hairs there. In E. taltalensis, dark brown wool is confined to the floral tube and the fruit. Conversely, E. iquiquensis has light-colored wool on both the floral tube and the fruit, along with abundant white wool on its areoles. While these distinctions can be obscured in severely dehydrated wild specimens, they are readily apparent in vigorously growing plants.

The geographic distribution of E. taltalensis, with populations nestled amongst E. iquiquensis, is notable. While not definitively explained, it is hypothesized that E. taltalensis exhibits more vigorous growth and superior adaptation to moister environments, potentially driving its local expansion. In contrast, E. iquiquensis, known for its exceptional drought tolerance, may be less competitive in conditions with greater moisture availability. In cultivation, E. taltalensis seedlings are easily identifiable. They grow faster, forming taller, more slender columns with fewer ribs. From an early stage, they lack wool in the areoles but display well-defined dark felt, a characteristic that persists throughout their development and aids in their identification.

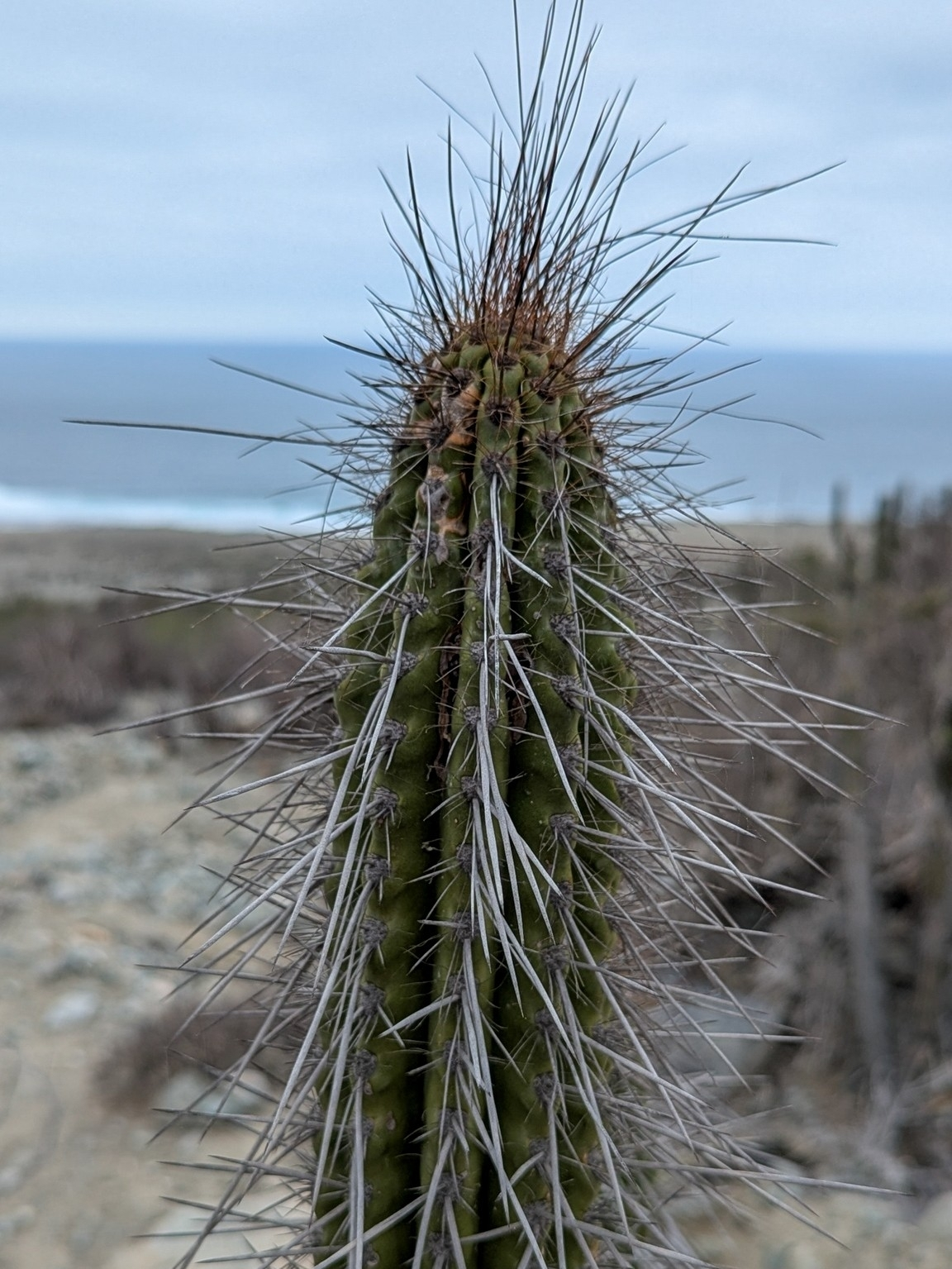
Spines

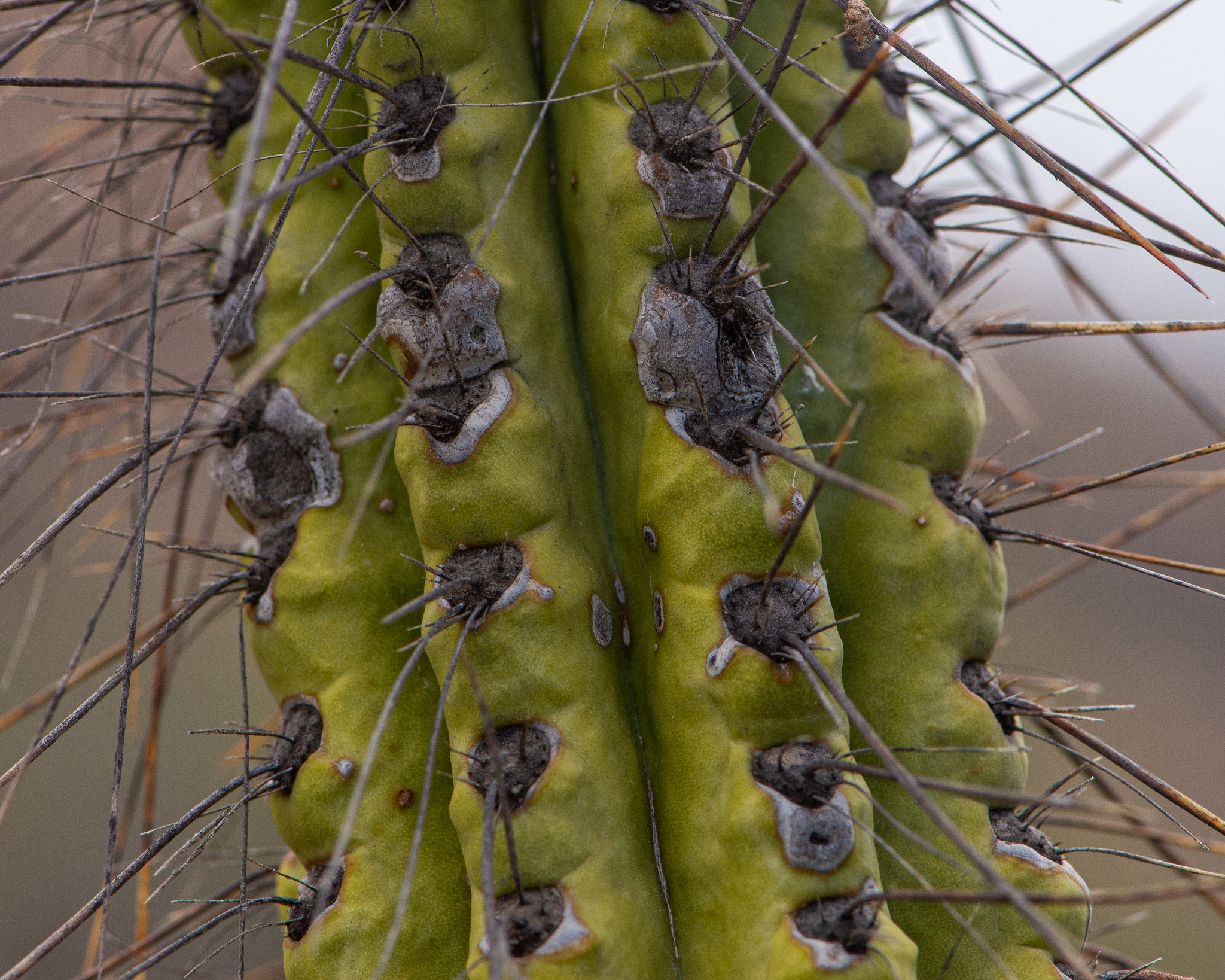
Areole and spines

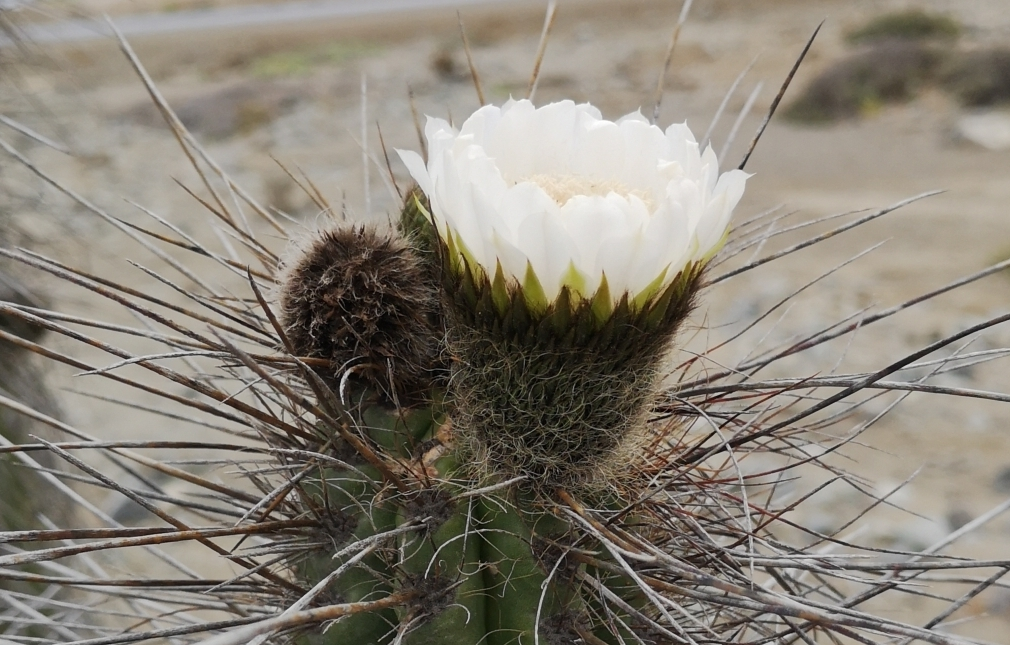
Flower

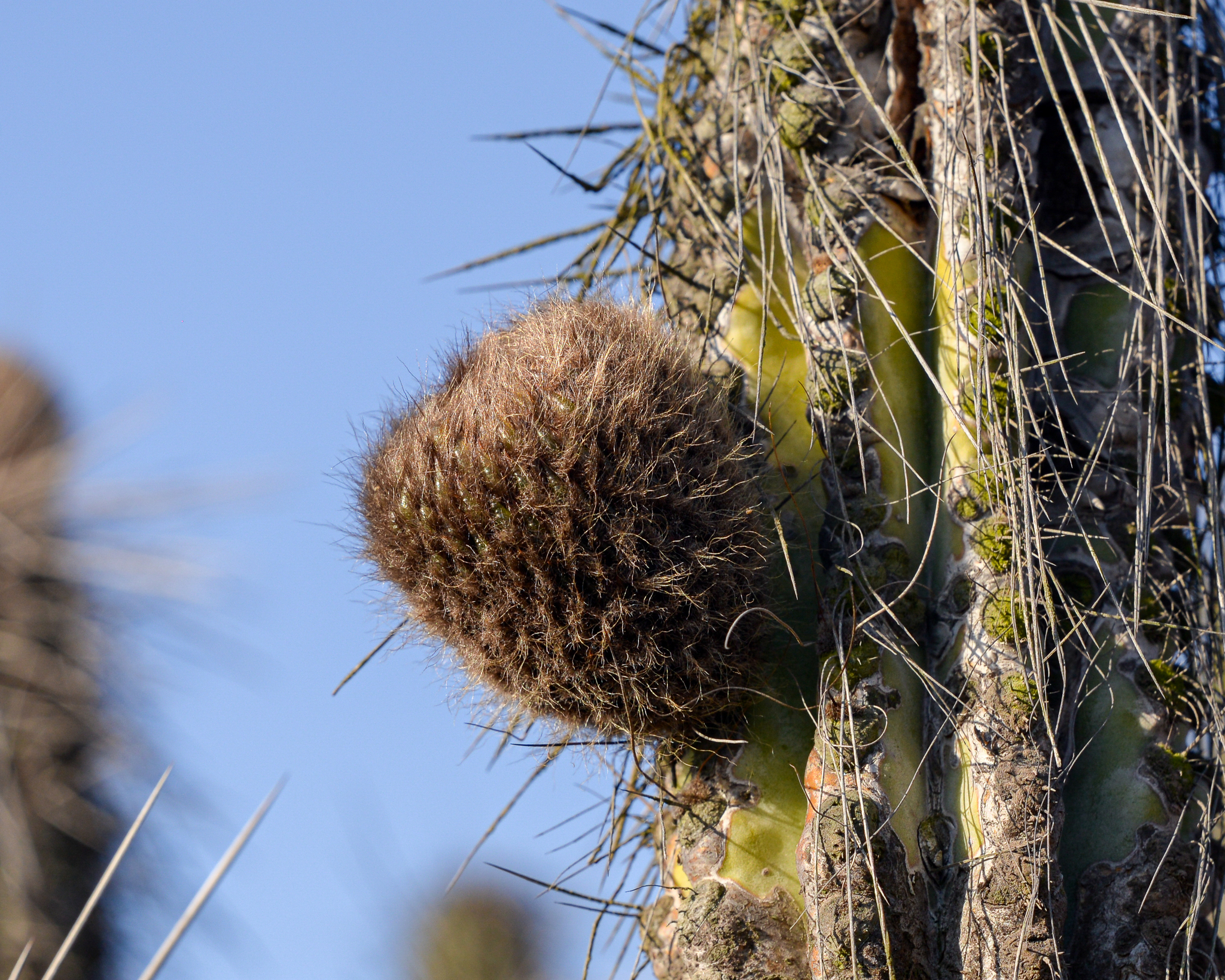
Fruit

== Distribution ==
The species Eulychnia taltalensis is native to a roughly 100-kilometer coastal stretch in northern Chile's Antofagasta Region, extending from Caleta Botija south of Antofagasta to the vicinity of Taltal. It thrives in desert and dry scrub biomes, typically found at elevations from near sea level up to 1200 meters. This arid coastal zone is characterized by steep mountains that descend directly to the sea, and the interaction of this rugged terrain with persistent coastal fogs, known as camanchacas, fosters surprisingly dense plant communities. Within this unique environment, Eulychnia taltalensis prefers to grow on exposed ridges and steep slopes, forming substantial clusters of individuals. These plants are often covered in lichens, indicating the high atmospheric humidity from the fogs and the stable rocky foundations they grow upon.

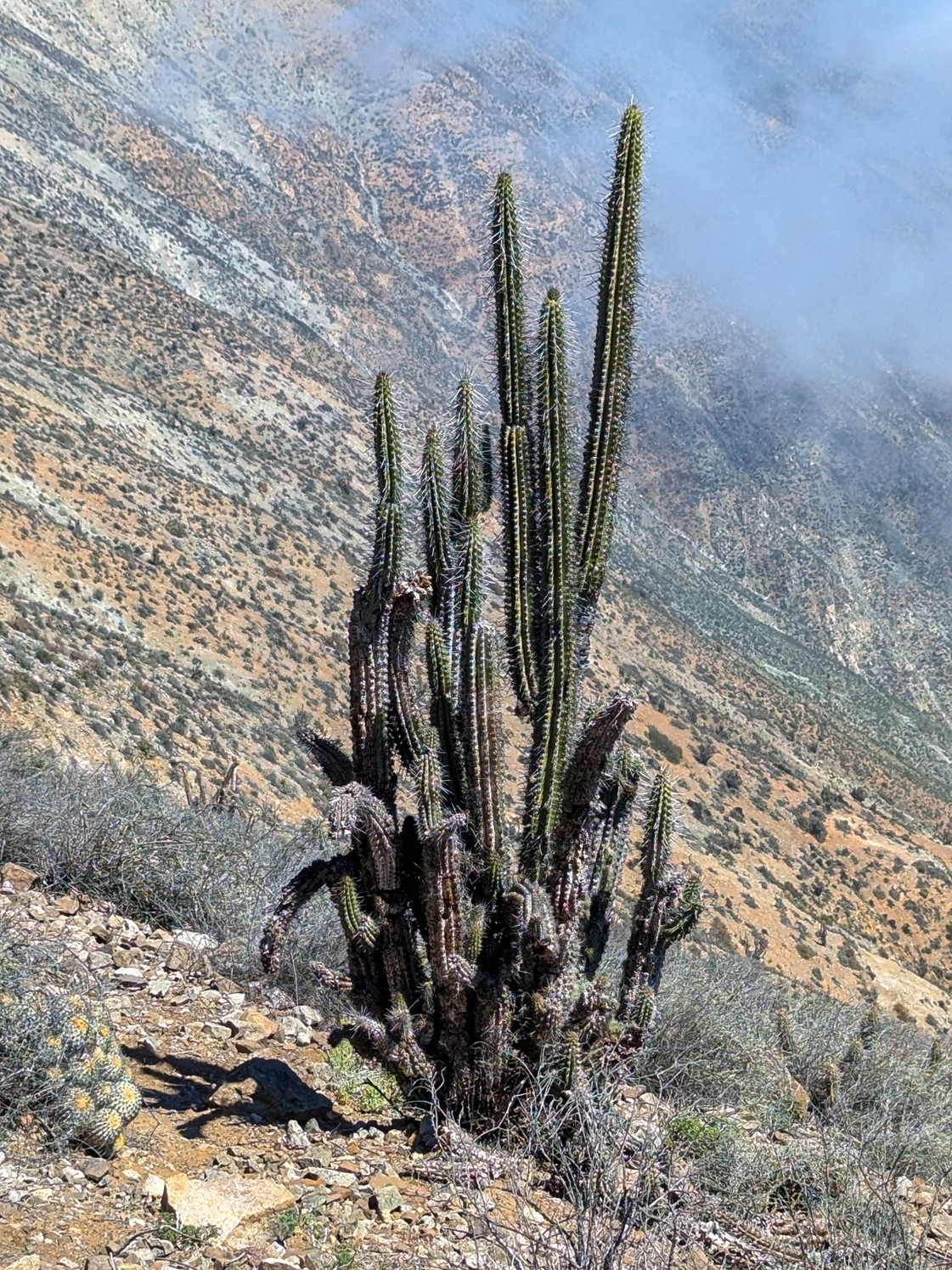
Habitat in Paposo, Taltal, Chile

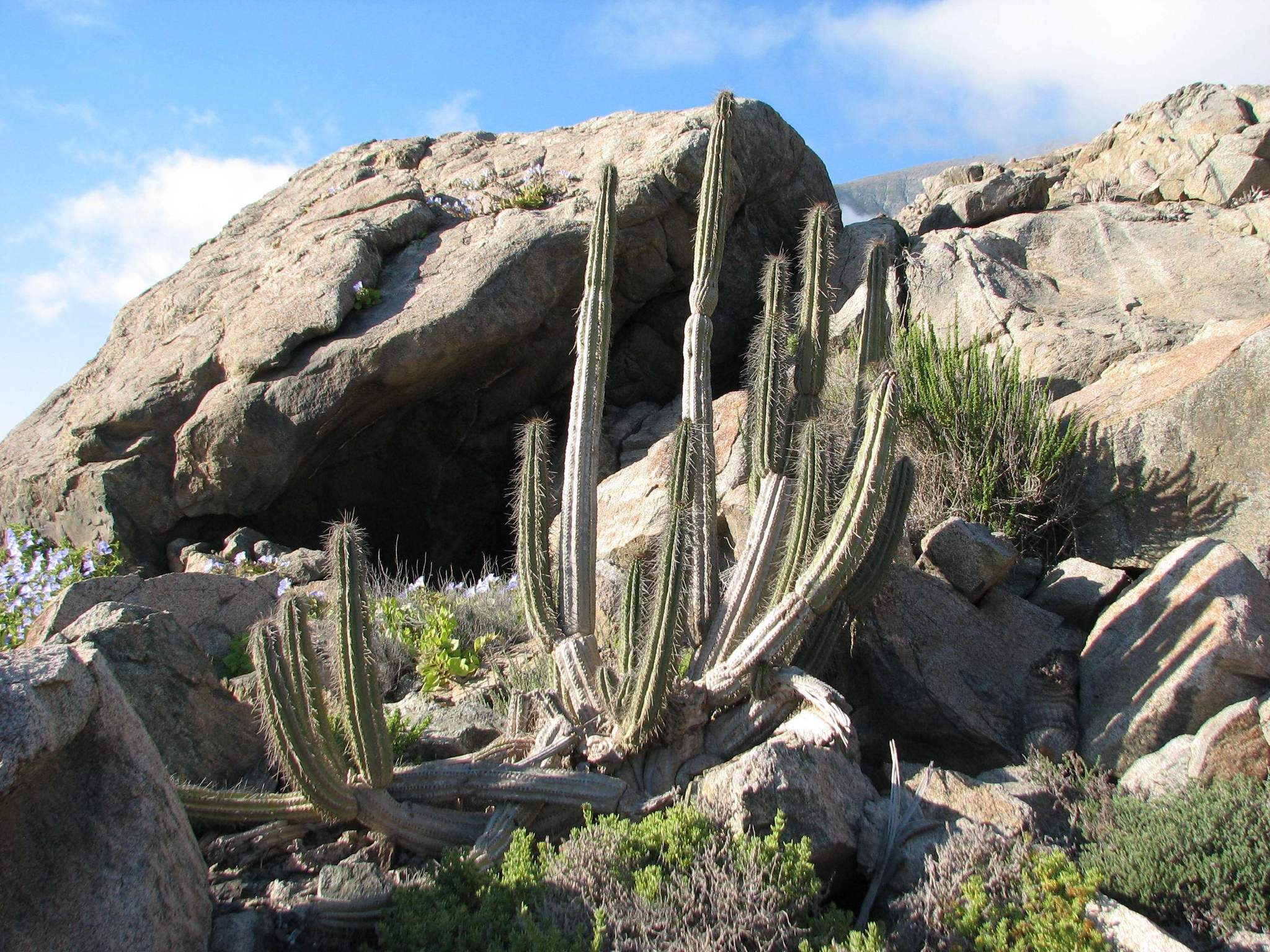
Plant in Paposo, Taltal, Chile

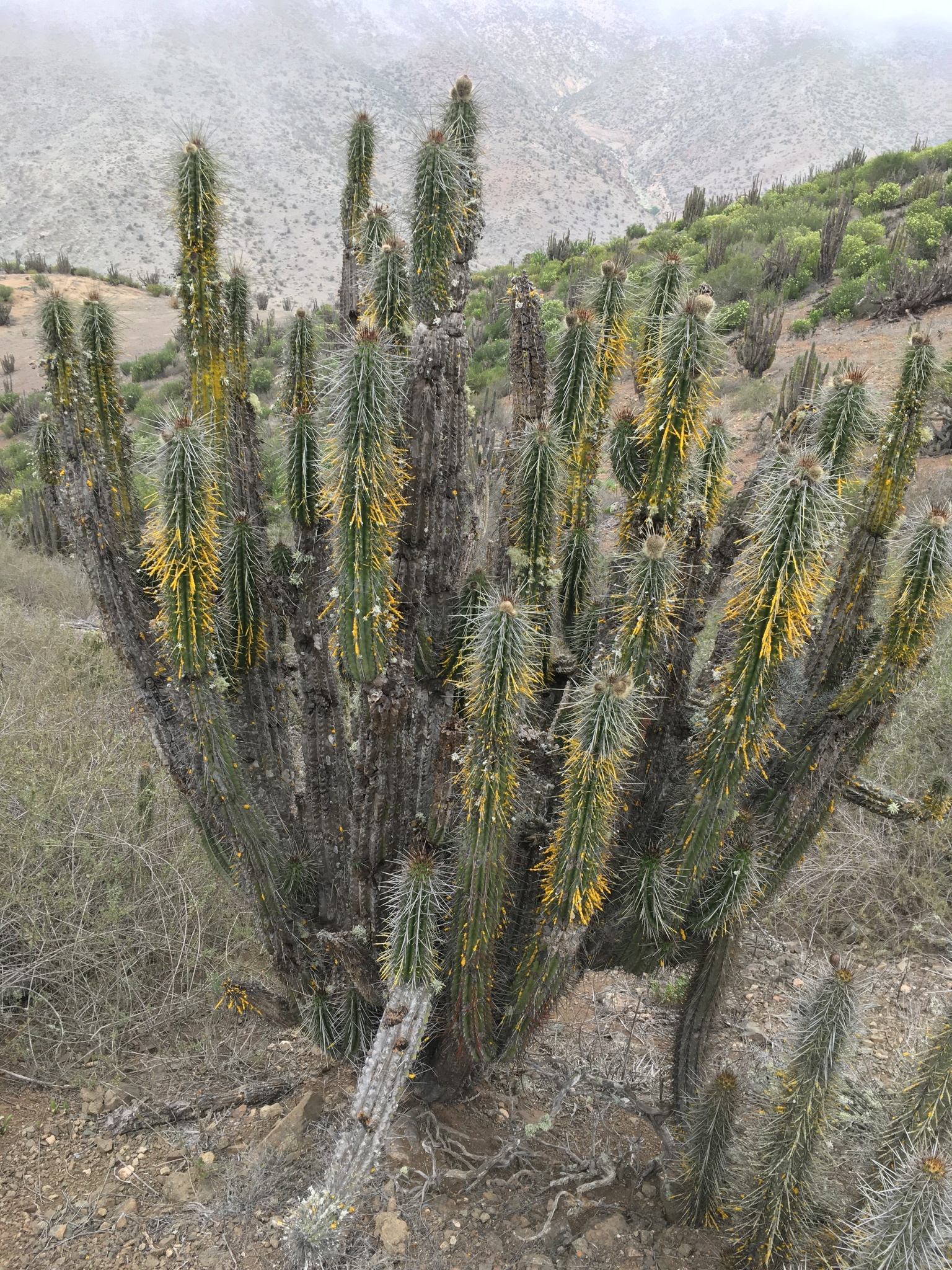

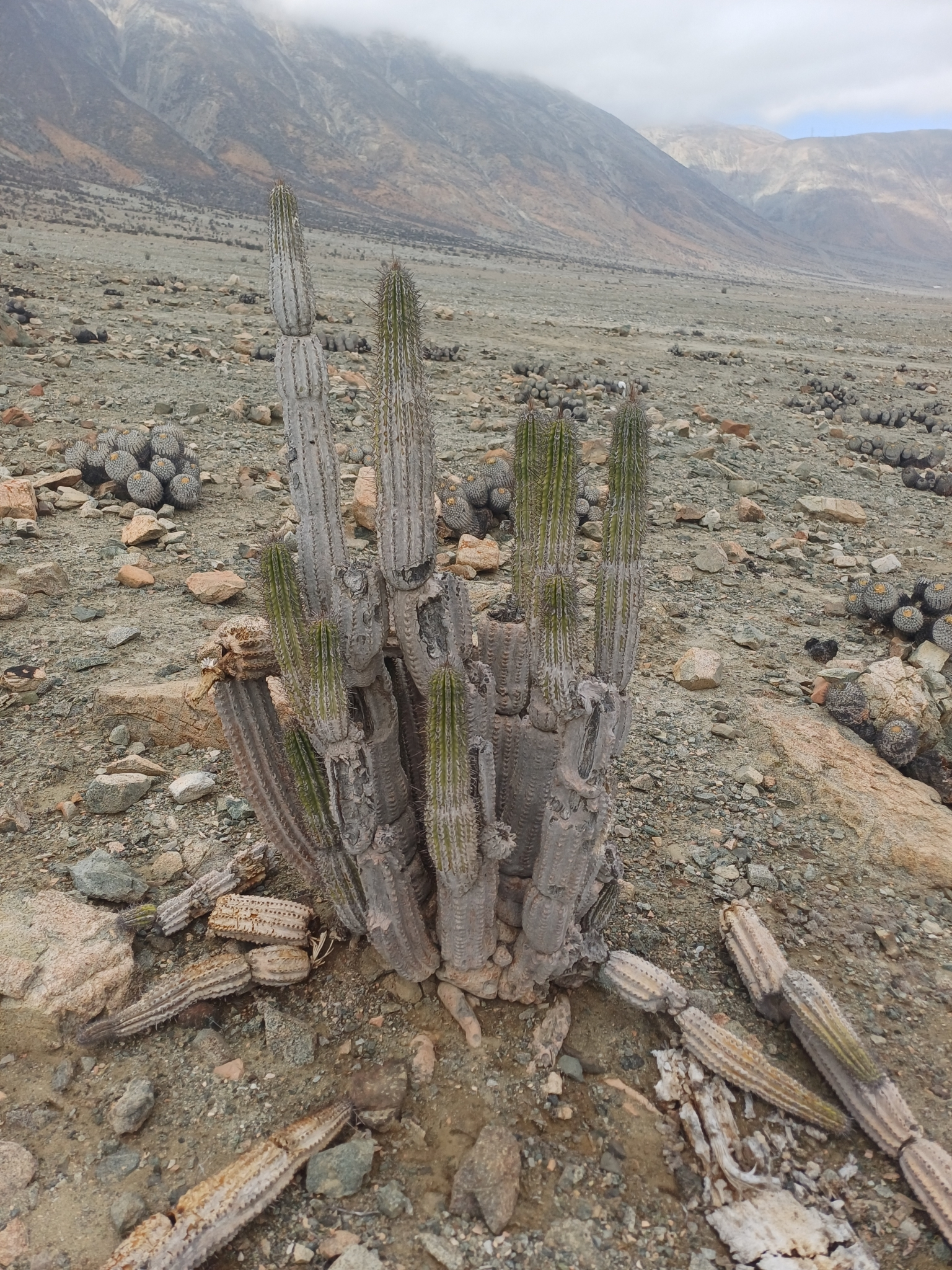

== Taxonomy ==
The species Eulychnia taltalensis was first described in 1980 by Friedrich Ritter as Eulychnia breviflora var. taltalensis. In 2011, Paul Hoxey elevated this variety to species status, renaming it Eulychnia taltalensis. The species name taltalensis refers to its origin near the city of Taltal in Chile's Antofagasta Region, with the suffix -ensis indicating this geographical association.
