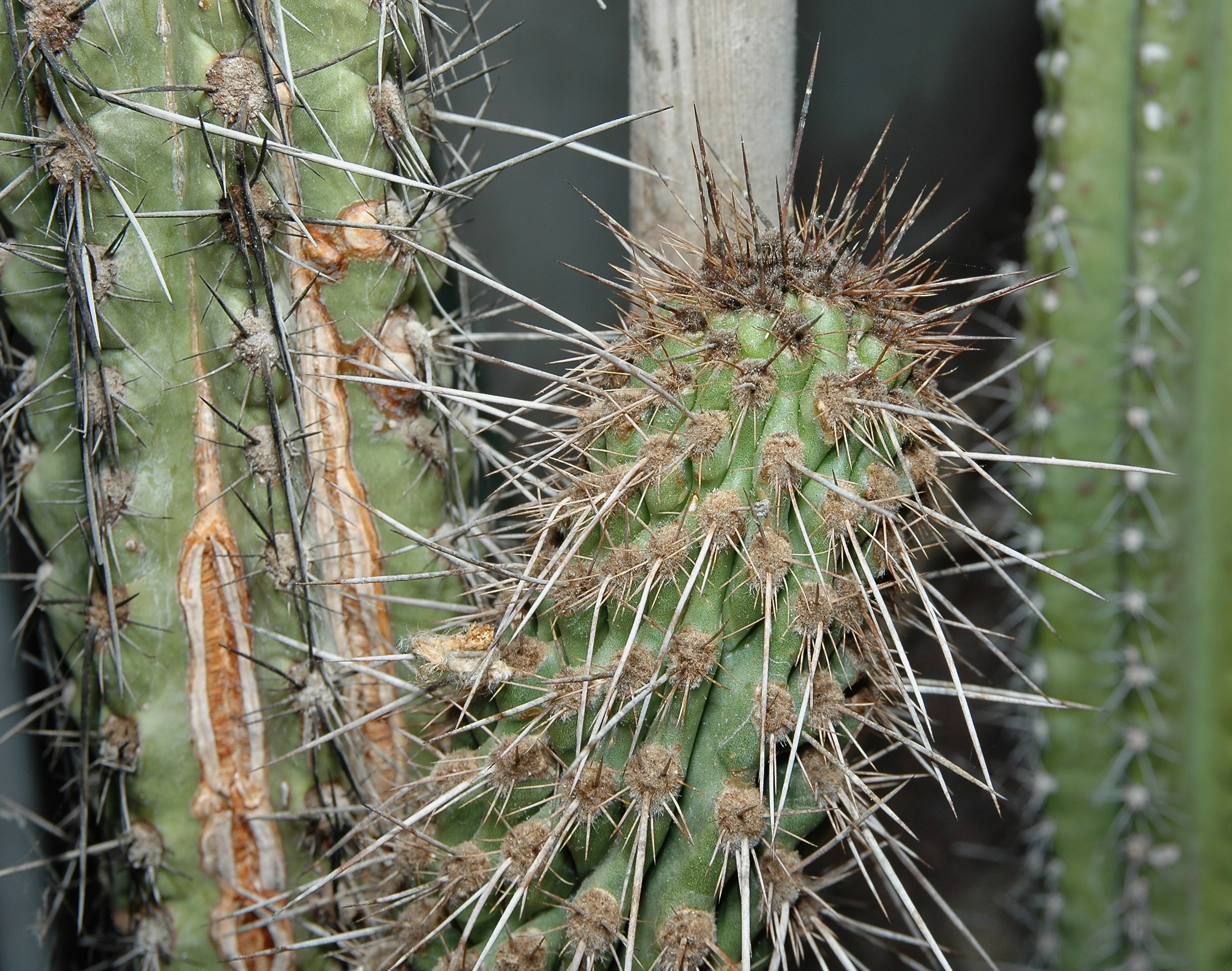
- Eulychnia castanea

Scientific classification
- Kingdom: Plantae
- Clade: Tracheophytes
- Clade: Angiosperms
- Clade: Eudicots
- Order: Caryophyllales
- Family: Cactaceae
- Subfamily: Cactoideae
- Tribe: Notocacteae
- Genus: Eulychnia; Phil. (1860)

Type species
- Eulychnia breviflora

Species
- See text.

Synonyms
- Philippicereus Backeb. (1942)

= Eulychnia =

Genus of cacti

Eulychnia is a genus of candelabriform or arborescent cacti. It includes nine species native to Peru and northern Chile. These desert cacti can survive under very hot conditions—temperatures can reach up to 50 degrees Celsius. Furthermore, this genus of cacti can also survive in some of the driest places in the world such as the Atacama Desert, the driest desert in the world.

== Description ==
Eulychnia species are shrubs or trees, often with abundant branching and sometimes a distinct trunk. Their stems are typically straight and ascending, or may lie decumbent, frequently forming a candelabra-like structure. These cacti possess 8 to 17 prominent ribs, with areoles adorned with wool or long hairs and bearing robust, lengthy spines.

The medium-sized flowers, appearing near the stem tips, are bell-shaped to funnel-shaped and remain open continuously. They range in color from white to pale pink. The pericarp and short floral tube are covered in woolly hairs or bristly spines, along with numerous scales. The resulting fruits are globose and fleshy, with a scaly or hairy surface, and rarely bear spines. The seeds are broadly ovoid, with a matte black or gray color and a finely warty texture.

== Taxonomy ==
The genus Eulychnia, named for its beautiful, candlestick-like columnar stems, was described by German botanist Rodulfo Amando Philippi in his 1860 publication, Florula Atacamensis seu Enumeriatio.

=== Species ===
As of January 2026, Plants of the World Online accepted the following species:

Image	Scientific name	Distribution
	Eulychnia acida Phil.	Chile.
	Eulychnia breviflora Phil.	northern Chile.
	Eulychnia castanea Phil.	Chile
	Eulychnia chorosensis P.Klaassen	Chile
	Eulychnia elata (F.Ritter) Lodé	Chile (Atacama)
	Eulychnia iquiquensis (K.Schum.) Britton & Rose	Chile.
	Eulychnia ritteri Cullmann	Peru (Arequipa)
	Eulychnia taltalensis (F.Ritter) Hoxey	Chile (Antofagasta)
	Eulychnia vallenarensis P.C.Guerrero & Helmut Walter	Chile (Atacama)

== Distribution ==
This genus naturally occurs across parts of South America, specifically in southern Peru and northern and central Chile, where its species primarily grow along the western coastal mountain range, generally at elevations below 1000 meters. These plants are strongly associated with the coastal deserts of Peru and Chile, and influenced by coastal fog, some species can grow to impressive sizes. Within these desert environments, they often form dense populations, becoming a dominant feature of the landscape. While their exact lifespan is unknown, these large specimens are believed to be very long-lived.
