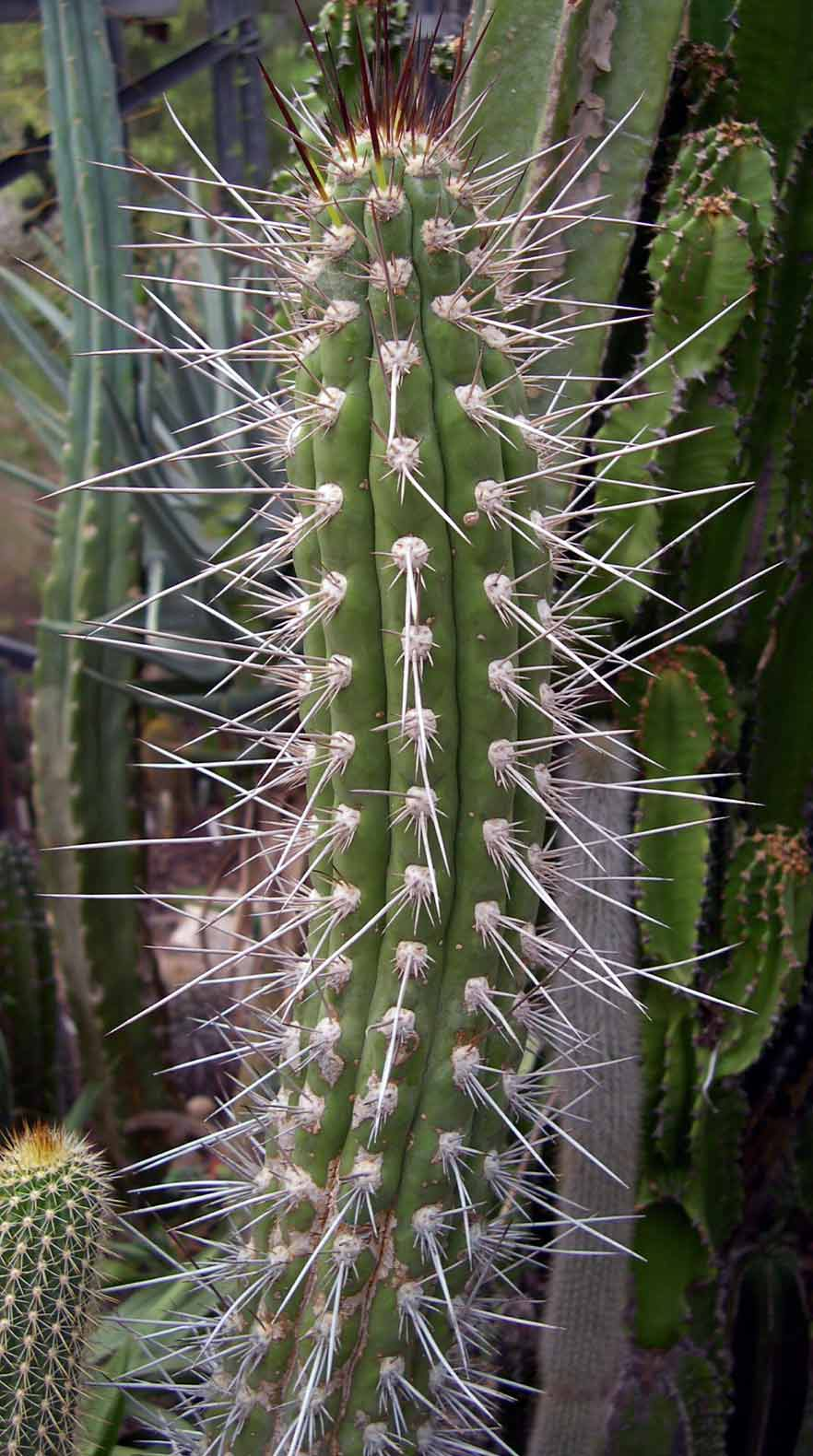

Conservation status
- Endangered (IUCN 3.1)

Scientific classification
- Kingdom: Plantae
- Clade: Tracheophytes
- Clade: Angiosperms
- Clade: Eudicots
- Order: Caryophyllales
- Family: Cactaceae
- Subfamily: Cactoideae
- Genus: Eulychnia
- Species: E. ritteri

Binomial name
- Eulychnia ritteri Cullmann 1985

Synonyms
- Eulychnia breviflora subsp. ritteri (Cullmann) D.R.Hunt 2002; Eulychnia iquiquensis subsp. ritteri (Cullmann) D.R.Hunt 2005

= Eulychnia ritteri =

Species of cactus

Eulychnia ritteri is a species of Eulychnia found in Peru.

== Description ==
Eulychnia ritteri is a cactus species that grows as a tree or shrub, reaching a height of 2 to 4 meters. It exhibits abundant branching from its base, with steep, somewhat greenish-gray stems that are 6 to 8 cm thick and have blunt tips. The stems are marked by 13 to 20 ribs, approximately 1.5 cm high, with rounded edges and nearly parallel, subtly notched sides where the furrows between the ribs become narrower towards the base. Its areoles are closely spaced, rounded, 5 to 7 mm in diameter, and covered in a dense, long, shaggy, grayish-white felt.Initially black to brownish-black, the spines mature to a grayish hue and are straight and needle-like. Around 12 radial spines, 0.5 to 2 cm long, are largely obscured by the felt, while 1 to 4 thin, sharp central spines, 3 to 8 cm long, typically point slightly downward. On higher growth, spines become more thread-like, twisted, and brown to yellowish-brown, measuring 1 to 4 cm, with older trunks developing more numerous, robust central spines.

The flowers, about 2 to 2.3 cm long and opening to approximately 1.5 mm, appear laterally along the branches, from midway to near the tips, and bloom during the day, closing at night. The flowers have about 15 pink petals, 8 to 10 mm long and 3 to 5 mm wide, which are nearly erect and parallel, not spreading, and possess blunt apices. The pericarpel and floral tube are covered in short, narrow, fleshy green scales and white woolly flakes. The floral tube is cup-shaped, 5 to 7 mm long and about 12 mm wide at the top. A significantly reduced nectary ring, forming a hollow ring about 0.5 mm high and 4 mm thick, encircles the base of the style, which is entirely open and nectarless. The white staminal filaments have continuous insertions to the margin, and the pale yellow to golden yellow anthers are positioned about one-quarter of the way up the petals. The thick, white style is 10 mm or less in length, with about 3 mm of this comprising 10–15 whitish, robust stigmatic lobes that are partially fused and located at or slightly below the anther level.

The fruit is a nearly spherical, orange-green berry, 2.5–3 cm in diameter, with a very thick wall and relatively few seeds. Its pulp is colorless, highly mucilaginous, and intensely acidic. The seeds, approximately 1.5 mm long, 0.9 mm wide, and 0.5 mm thick, are dark brown, nearly smooth, matte, and feature a strongly convex back and a small, oval, white hilum on the ventral side.

== Distribution ==
This species is native to southern Peru, specifically along the arid coastal desert of Chala in the Arequipa department. It thrives in desert and dry scrub biomes, preferring extremely dry, rocky terrain on the leeward slopes of hills. These locations, which can be moderately to steeply sloped, benefit from occasional fog from the Pacific Ocean and sporadic rainfall, providing vital moisture. The rocky substrate itself offers an ecological advantage by retaining moisture, moderating soil temperature, and reducing evaporation, thus creating a more favorable microenvironment for the plant's establishment and growth.

Ecologically, the species engages in several interactions. Its flowers are pollinated by a diverse array of insects, including sweat bees (Halictidae, genus Lasioglossum), soldier beetles (Melyridae), and skipper butterflies (Hesperiidae, such as Pyrgus sp.). The plant also plays a structural role, as some individuals are utilized by the bird Pseudasthenes cactorum for nesting material. Furthermore, rodents like the Peruvian mountain viscacha (Lagidium peruanum) consume the fruits, likely aiding in seed dispersal through their droppings.

The accompanying flora in this habitat includes numerous annual plants such as Onoseris odorata, Nolana chancoana, Cristaria multifida, and Malesherbia arequipensis. Perennial species like Trixis cacalioides, Heliotropium krauseanum, Ephedra americana, Waltheria ovata, Galvezia elisensii, and Tillandsia purpurea are also present. Various cacti, including Eriosyce islayensis, Weberbauerocereus weberbaueri, Neoraimondia arequipensis, Cumulopuntia sphaerica, and Haageocereus decumbens, are also found in association. In specific ravines like Febres and Huaccllaco, individuals of this species have been observed partially covered by lichens, indicating the influence of atmospheric humidity and the stable microclimate of these arid coastal regions.

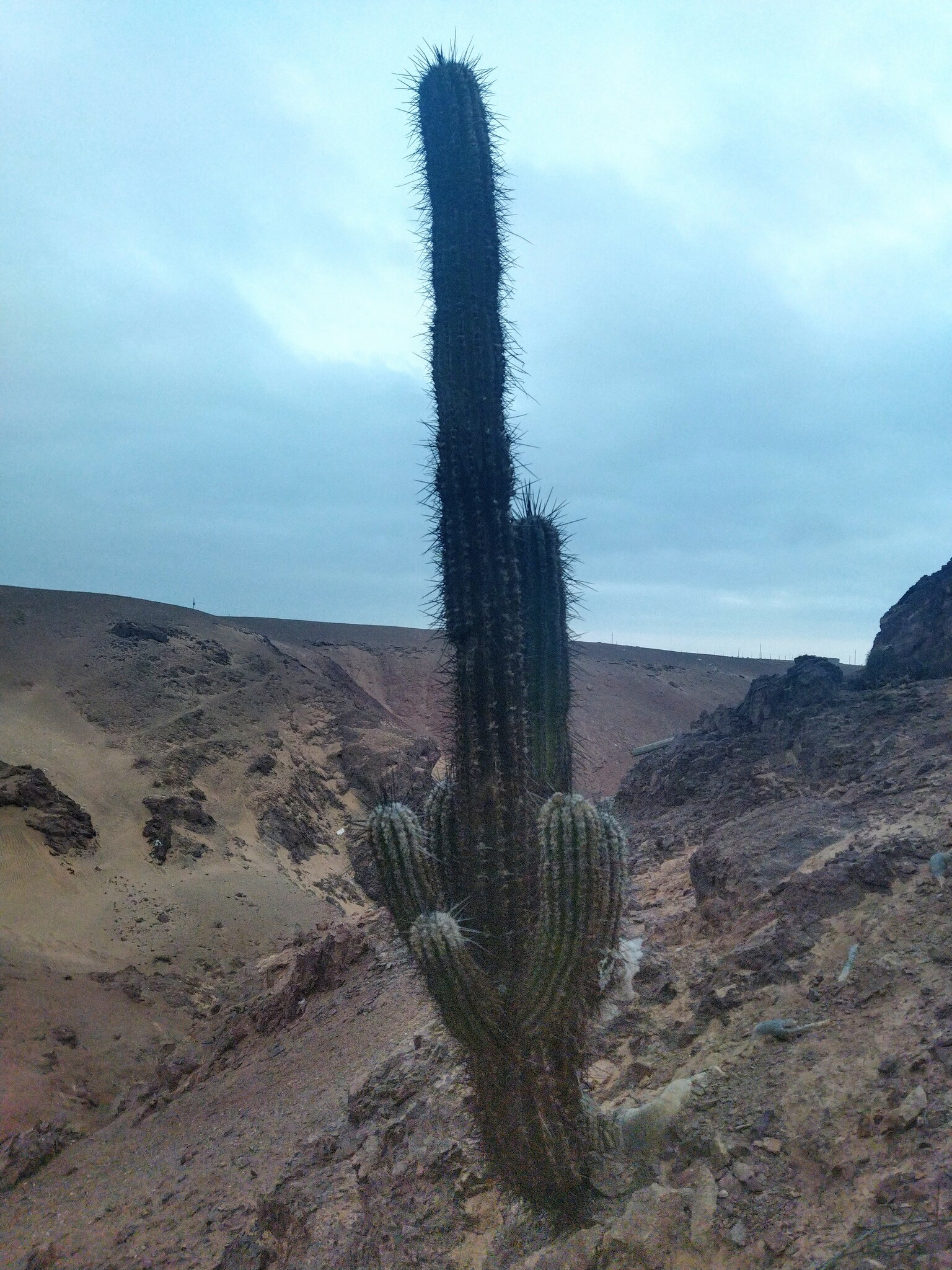
Plant in Chala, Peru

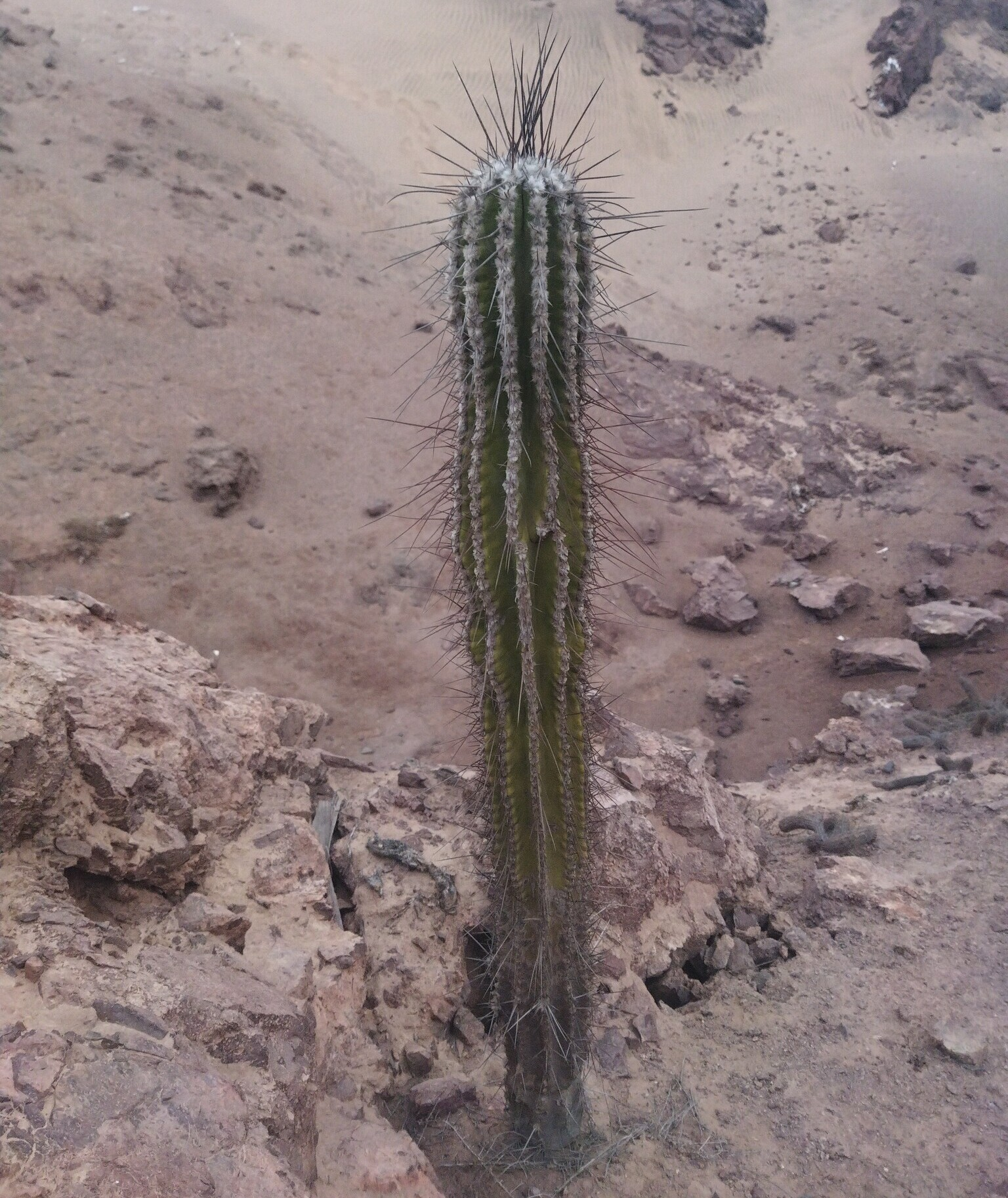

== Taxonomy ==
Eulychnia ritteri, a species discovered and collected by German botanist Friedrich Ritter in Arequipa, Peru, was first described by Wilhelm Cullmann in the scientific journal Kakteen und andere Sukkulenten in 1958. The species was named in Ritter's honor.
