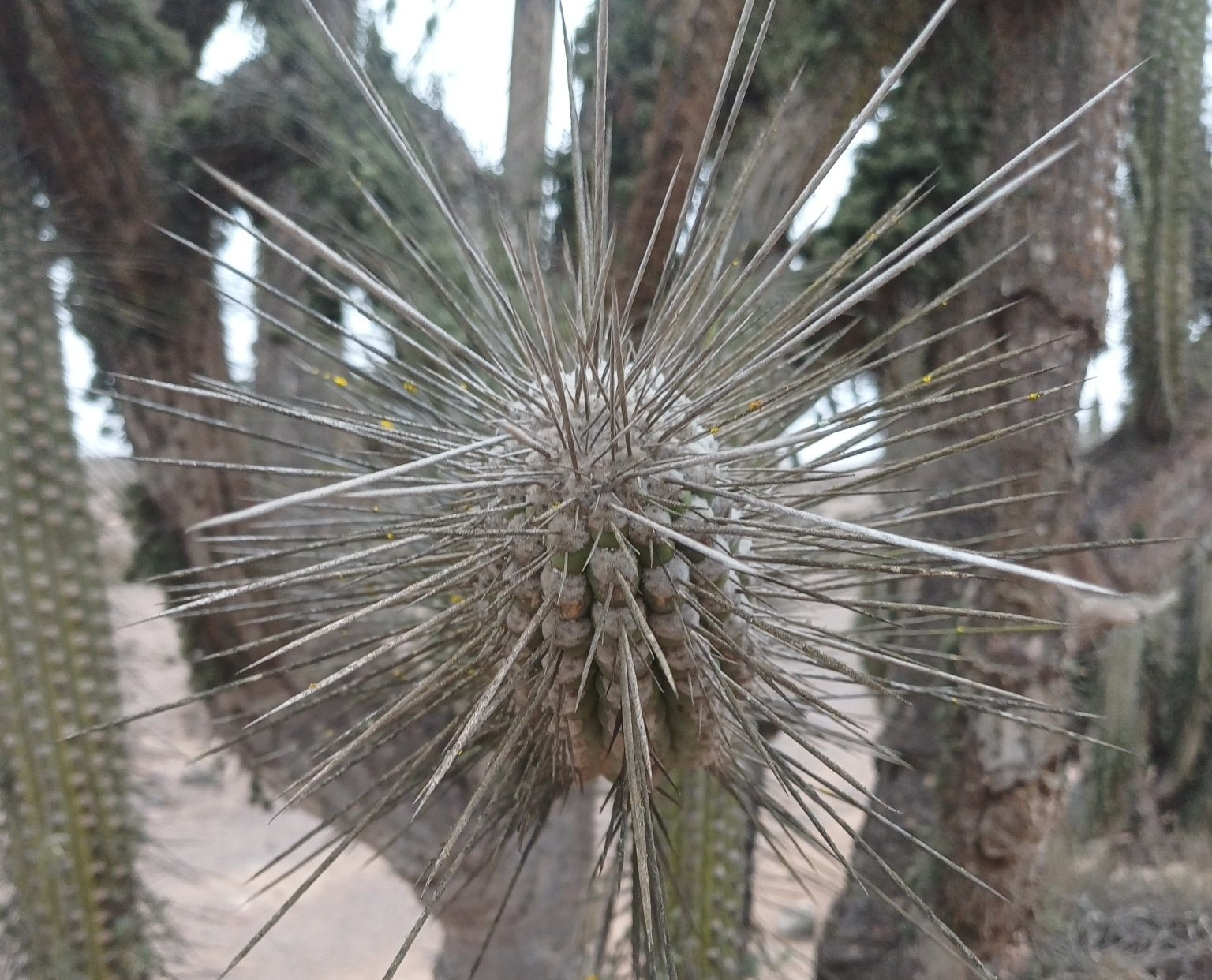

Scientific classification
- Kingdom: Plantae
- Clade: Tracheophytes
- Clade: Angiosperms
- Clade: Eudicots
- Order: Caryophyllales
- Family: Cactaceae
- Subfamily: Cactoideae
- Genus: Eulychnia
- Species: E. elata

Binomial name
- Eulychnia elata (F.Ritter) Lodé, 2020 publ. 2022

Synonyms
- Eulychnia acida var. elata F.Ritter 1980; Philippicereus elatus (F.Ritter) Guiggi 2020

= Eulychnia elata =

Species of cactus

Eulychnia elata is a species of Eulychnia found in Chile.

== Description ==
Eulychnia elata is a tree-like cactus that grows upright, typically reaching heights of 4 to 6 meters, though specimens in the northernmost part of its range, northeast of Copiapó, are smaller, not exceeding 3 meters and possessing thinner branches. The trunk can be up to 40 cm thick, and the plant produces shoots from its base to higher points. Its epidermis is grayish-green, and its branches are 8 to 10 cm in diameter. The stems feature 9 to 13 ribs, each 5 to 8 mm high and 2 to 3 cm wide, separated by straight or slightly wavy furrows. Areoles, covered in gray felt, are 7 to 12 mm in diameter and spaced 5 to 10 mm apart, bearing relatively robust spines.

Flowers usually form at or near the stem tips, measuring 6.5 to 8.5 cm long and opening to 4 to 5 cm wide with a subtle fragrance. The white petals, often marked with a pinkish central stripe, are 2 to 3 cm long and 1 to 1.5 cm wide, with the outermost having a slight greenish tint. The floral receptacle, 3 to 4.5 cm long, curves slightly upward and widens from 1 to 1.5 cm at its base to 3 to 4 cm at the top, where dark brown wool tufts are present. Stamens are concentrated in the lower half of the floral tube and along its margin, with lower ones measuring around 1.6 cm and upper ones about 1 cm. The white style is 2 to 2.5 cm long, bearing 18 to 22 pale cream stigmatic lobes that are 6 to 10 mm long. The fruit retains the woolly covering of the floral receptacle and contains relatively large seeds distinguished by a pointed base, a faint dorsal keel, and a shorter hilum compared to related species.

Eulychnia elata is frequently mistaken for Eulychnia acida due to their similar appearance, but key differences exist. Eulychnia elata is generally larger, growing to 4 to 6 meters compared to E. acida's typical 1.5 to 4 meters. Its stems are also thinner, measuring 8 to 10 cm in diameter with 9 to 13 ribs, whereas E. acida has fewer ribs, ranging from 10 to 16. Furthermore, the flowers of Eulychnia elata are longer, reaching 6.5 to 8.5 cm, surpassing the 5 to 7 cm length found in E. acida.

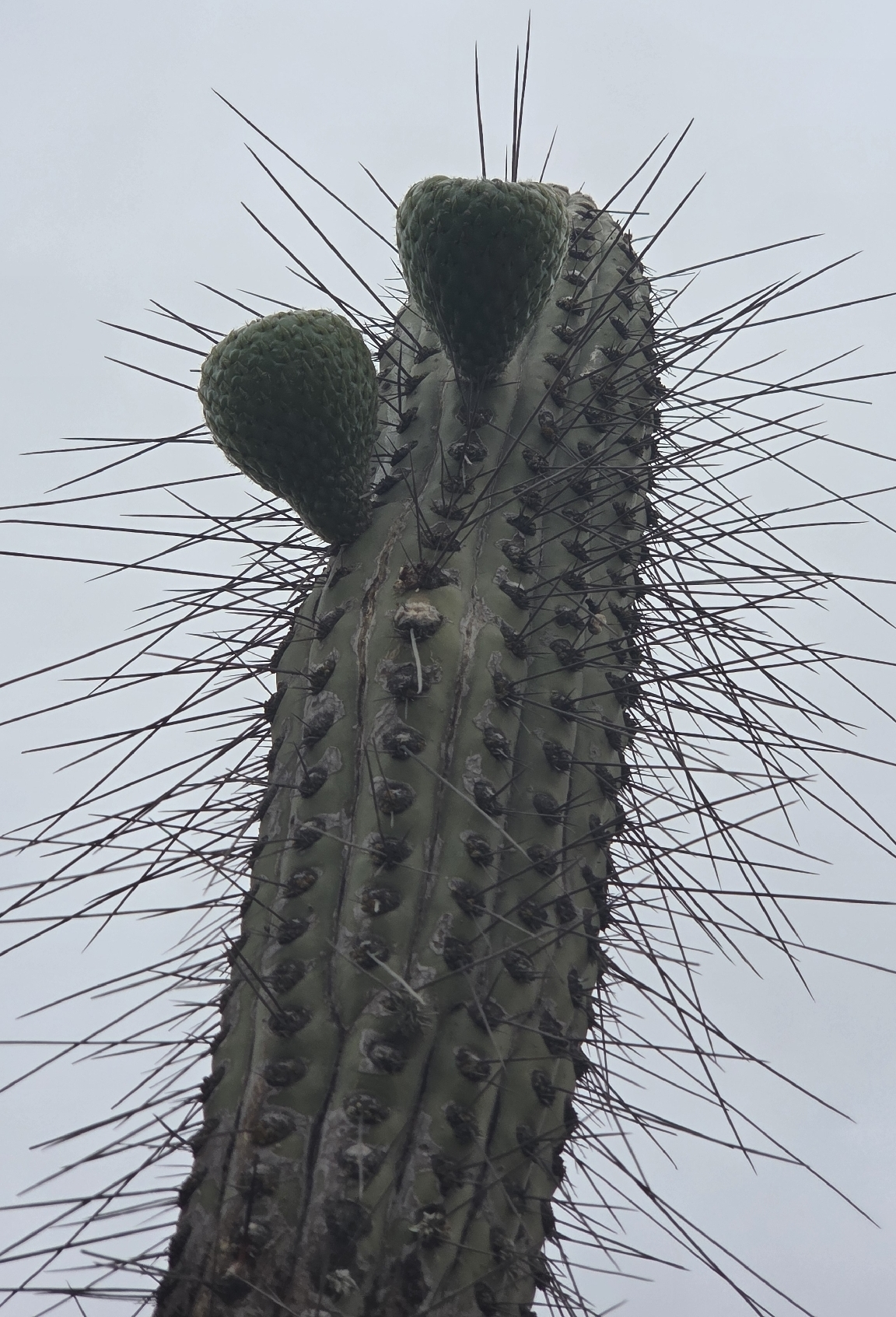
Fruit

== Distribution ==
This species is native to northern Chile, found between the Huasco River valley and northeast of Copiapó in the Atacama Region, where it thrives in desert and dry scrub environments.

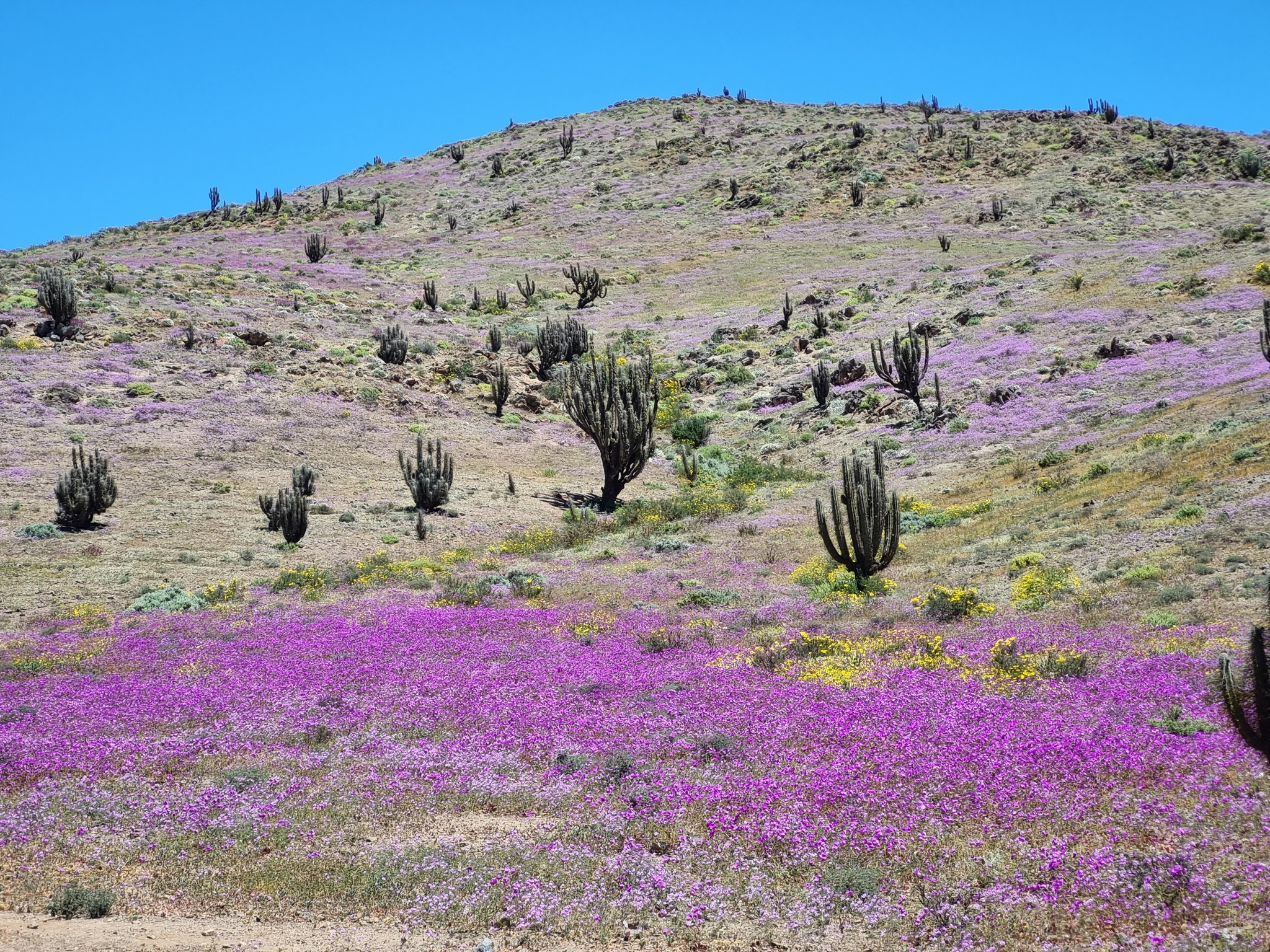

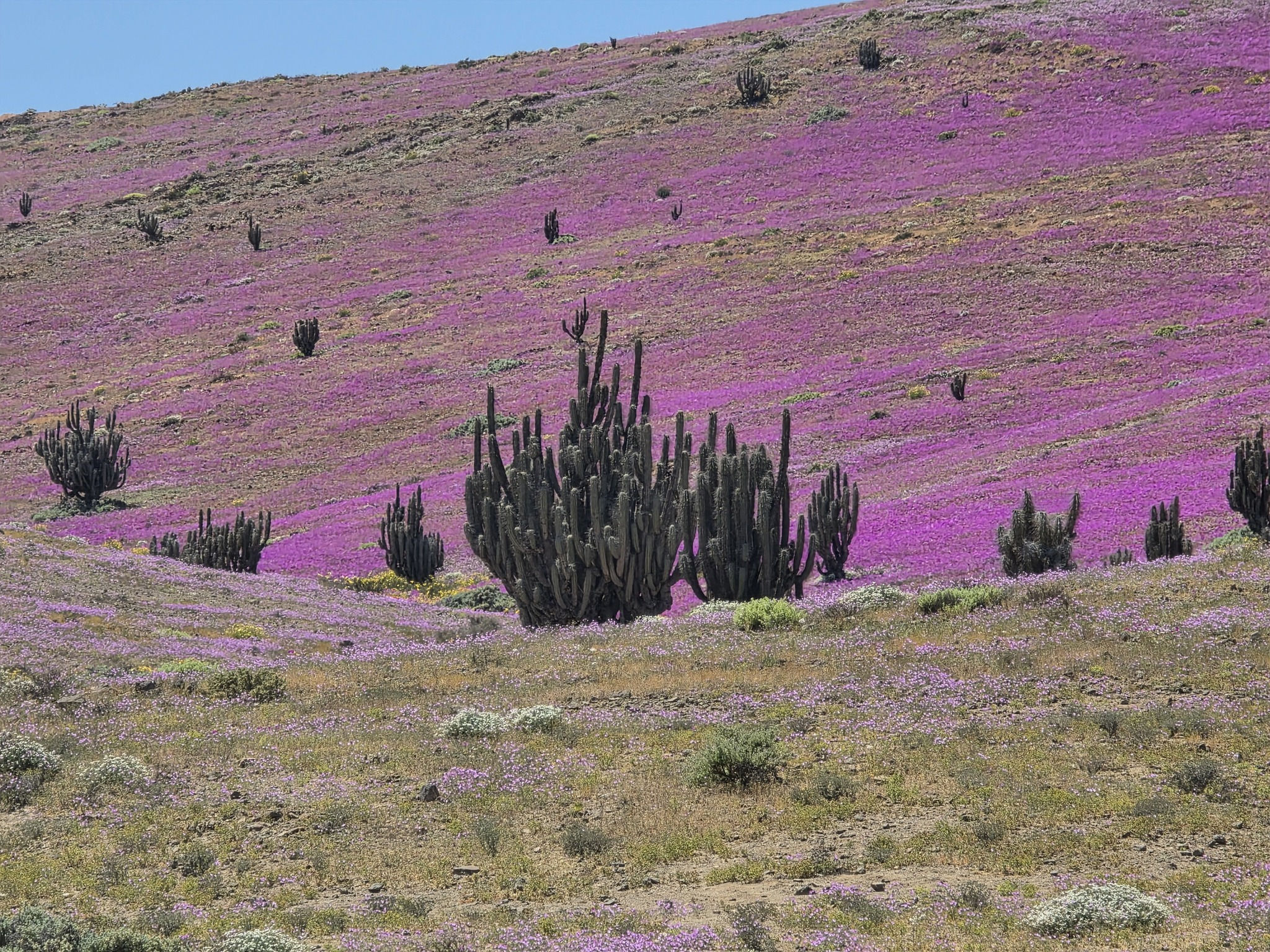
Habitat in Carrizal Alto, Huasco, Chile

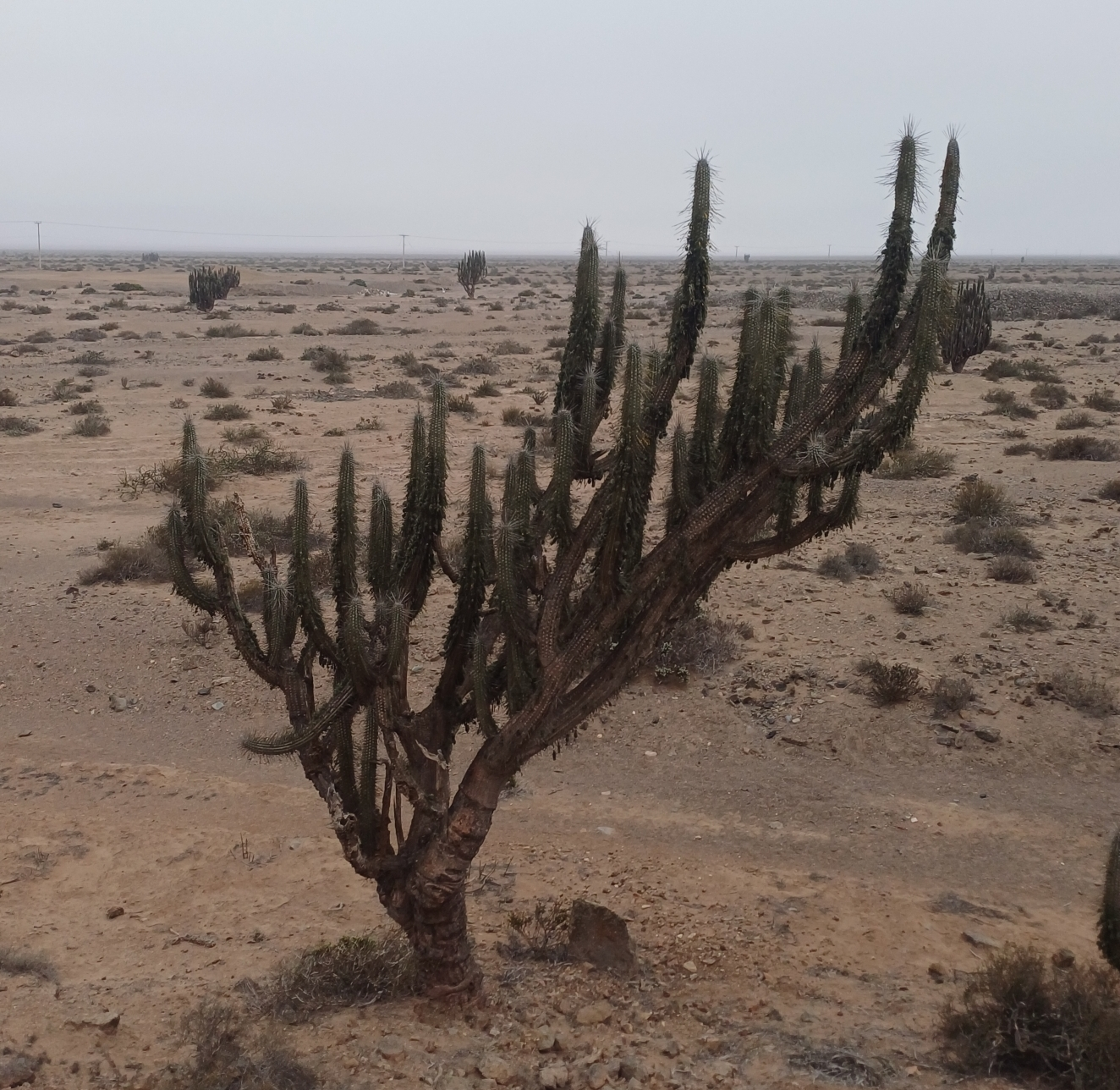
Plant in Hacienda Castilla, Copiapó, Chile

== Taxonomy ==
It was first described in 1980 by Friedrich Ritter as Eulychnia acida var. elata. In 2022, Joël Lodé reclassified it as a distinct species, naming it Eulychnia elata. The name "elata" comes from the Latin word for "raised," "elevated," or "tall," referencing the plant's height.
