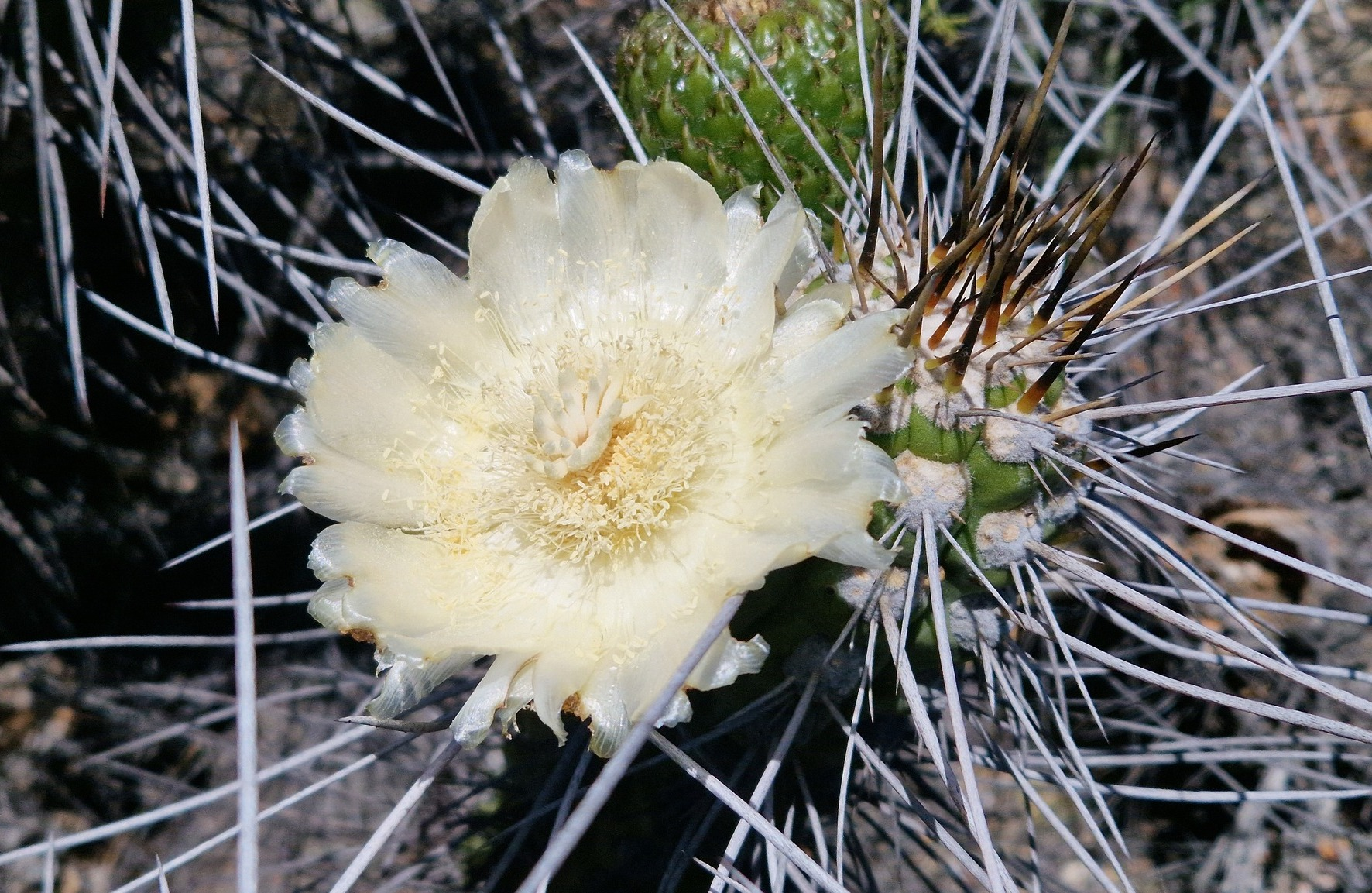

Scientific classification
- Kingdom: Plantae
- Clade: Tracheophytes
- Clade: Angiosperms
- Clade: Eudicots
- Order: Caryophyllales
- Family: Cactaceae
- Subfamily: Cactoideae
- Genus: Eulychnia
- Species: E. vallenarensis

Binomial name
- Eulychnia vallenarensis P.C.Guerrero & Helmut Walter 2019

Synonyms
- Philippicereus vallenarensis (P.C.Guerrero & Helmut Walter) Guiggi 2020

= Eulychnia vallenarensis =

Species of cactus

Eulychnia vallenarensis is a species of Eulychnia found in Chile.

== Description ==
Eulychnia vallenarensis is a shrubby cactus that grows to a height of 1 to 1.5 meters. Its branches are mostly lying flat with the upper portions curving upwards, measuring 8 to 10 cm in diameter and exhibiting a yellowish-green hue. The stem features 8 to 10 low, broad ribs, each 2.5 to 3 cm wide. Areoles, approximately 1 cm in diameter and covered with short gray felt, are spaced 2 to 2.5 cm apart. The cactus has needle-like spines that start blackish and age to gray. Each areole bears zero to five radial spines, 1 to 5 cm long, primarily on the lower portion, and one to three longer central spines, 5 to 15 cm in length.

The white, spatulate flowers, with distinct apexes and green sepals, are subapical to lateral and measure 6 to 8 cm long. The axils of the scaly bracts contain sparse, short, gray wool. The mucilaginous fruit, 5 to 7 cm long, ripens to an orange color and is covered similarly to the flower. Numerous seeds, about 1.5 mm long, have a tuberculate and somewhat ribbed seed coat.

Eulychnia vallenarensis can be distinguished from the morphologically similar Eulychnia acida by its shrubby growth habit, reaching 1–1.5 meters in height, compared to the tree-like form of E. acida which can grow up to 7 meters. Additionally, E. vallenarensis has semi-prostrate branches, whereas E. acida's branches are erect to ascending. Structural differences include smaller stem diameters of 8 to 10 cm and 8 to 10 ribs, in contrast to the 10–16 ribs found in E. acida. Each areole in E. vallenarensis typically has only 1 to 5 radial spines, significantly fewer than the numerous spines characteristic of E. acida.

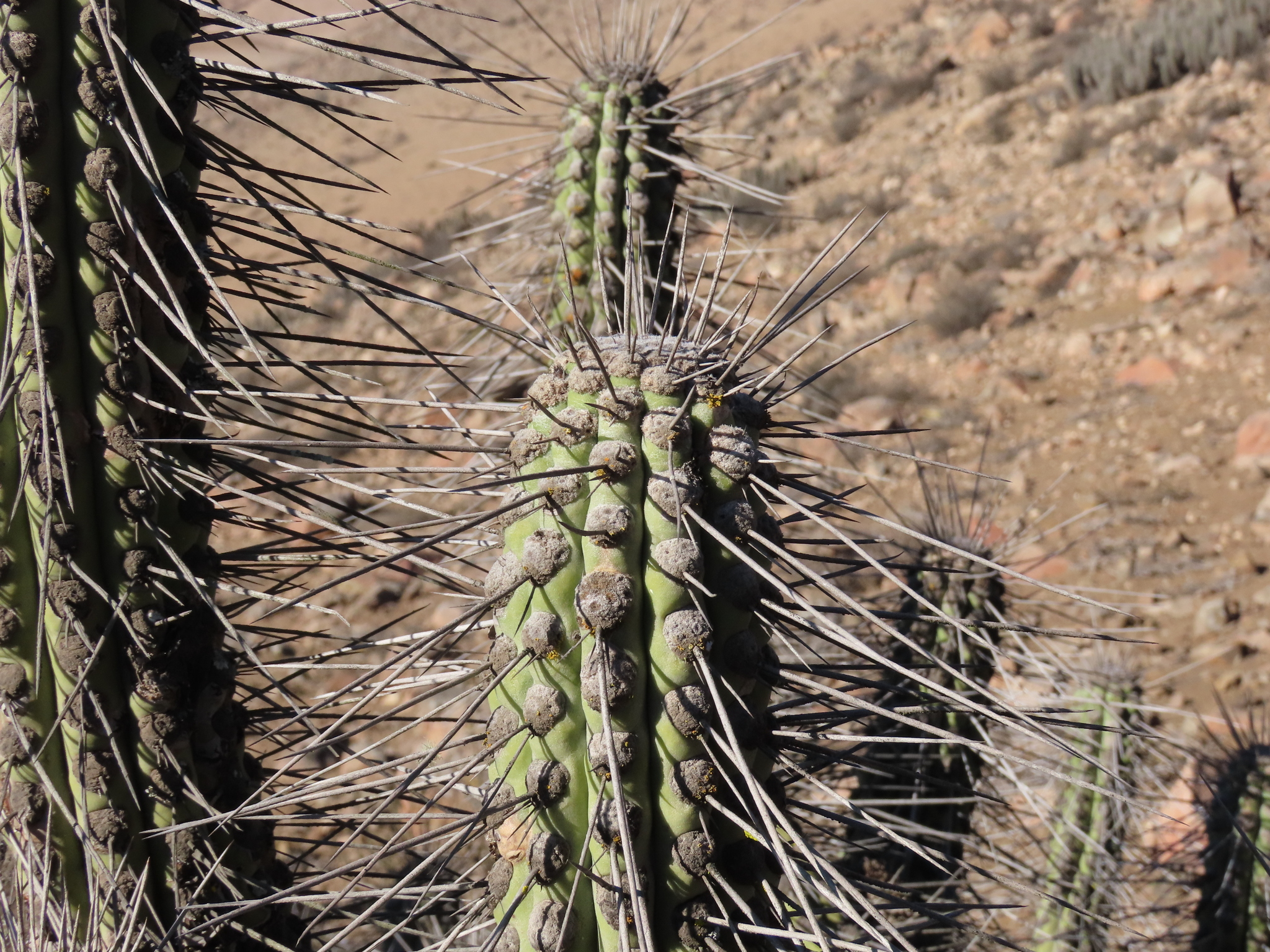
Spines and areoles closeup

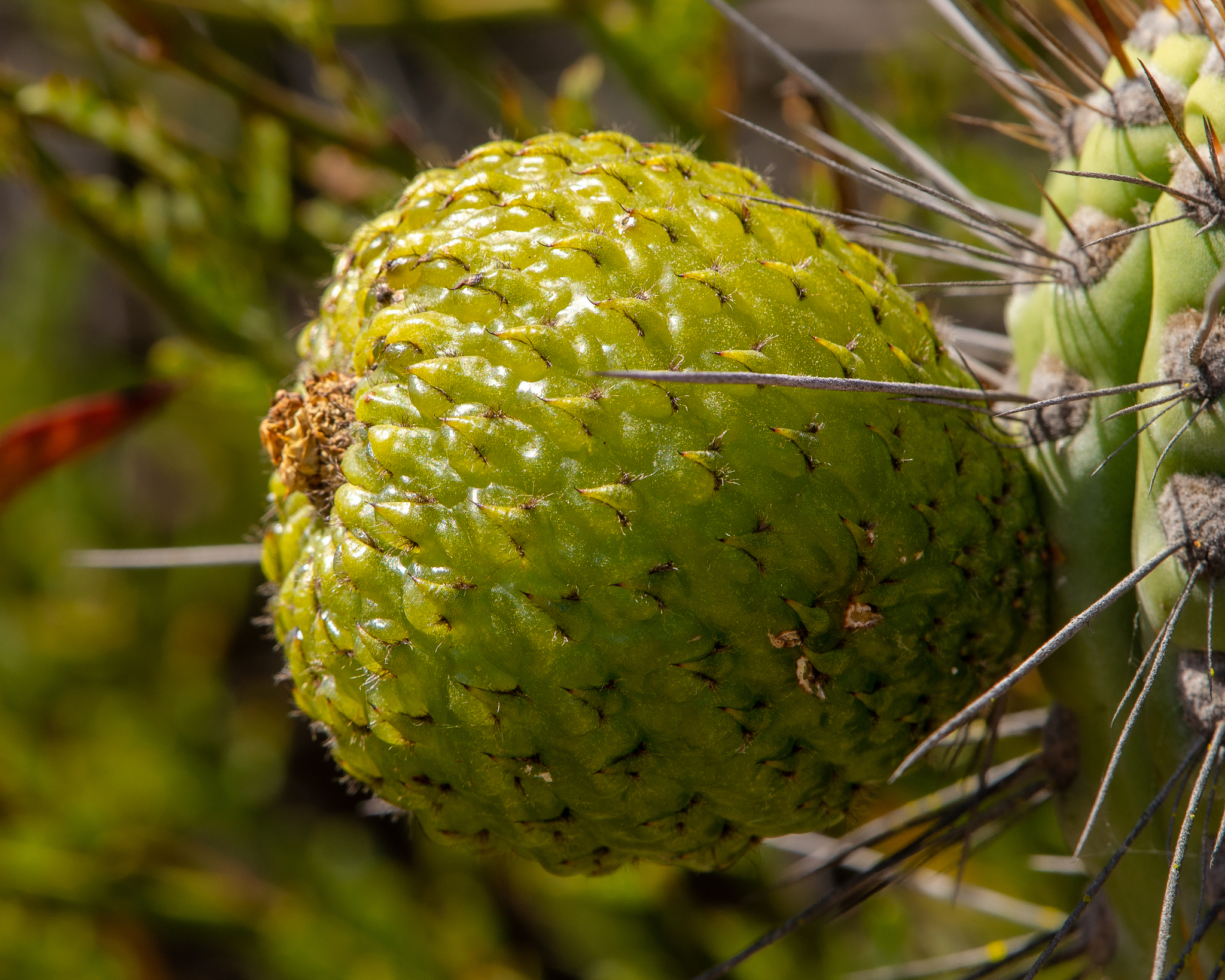
Fruit

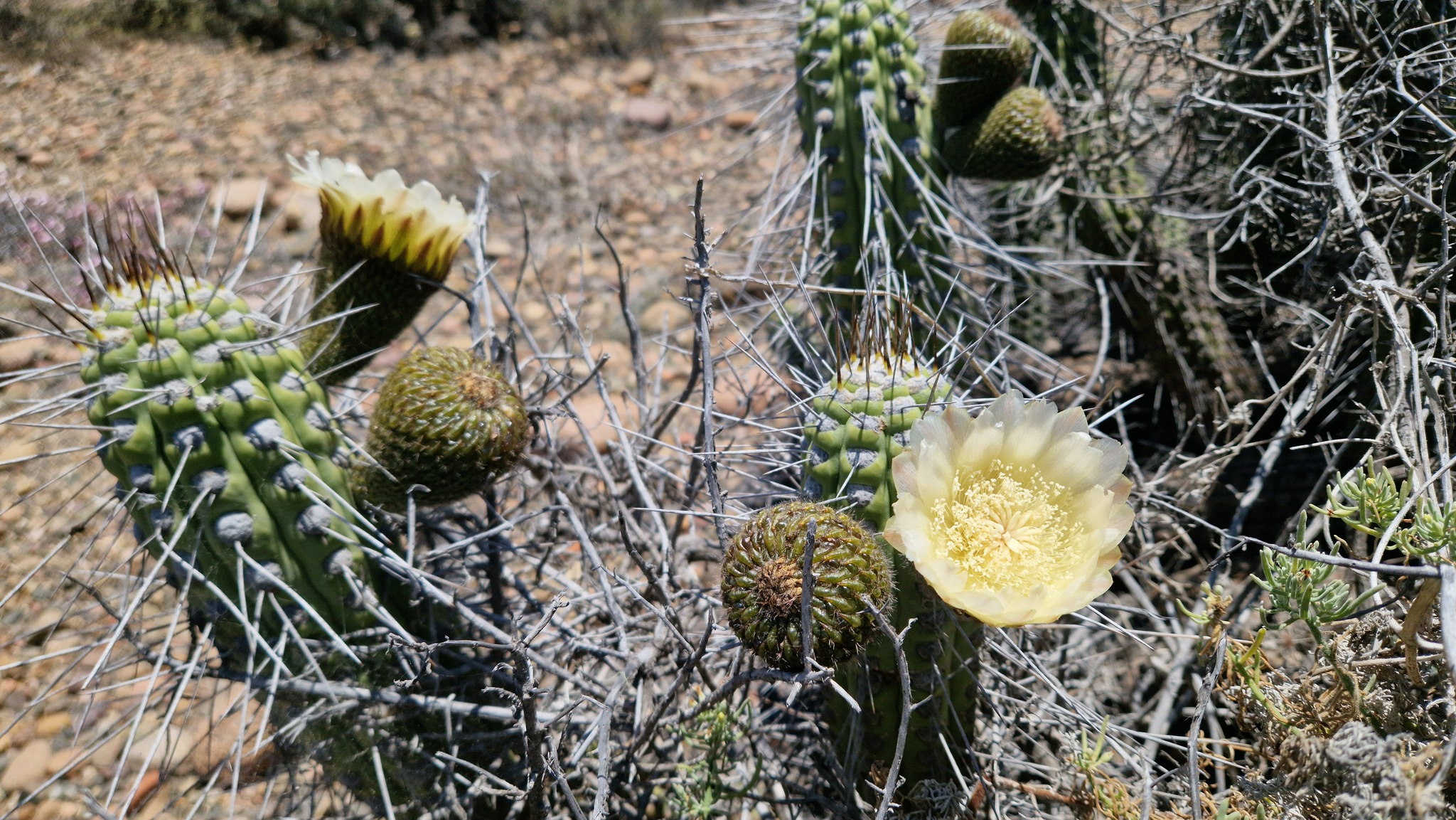
Flowers

== Distribution ==
Eulychnia vallenarensis is native to northern Chile, specifically the Atacama Region, with its range extending from the northern Domeyko area to the Huasco River valley. This species primarily inhabits desert and dry scrub biomes, favoring inland locations away from the coast and can be found at elevations between 600 and 1300 meters.

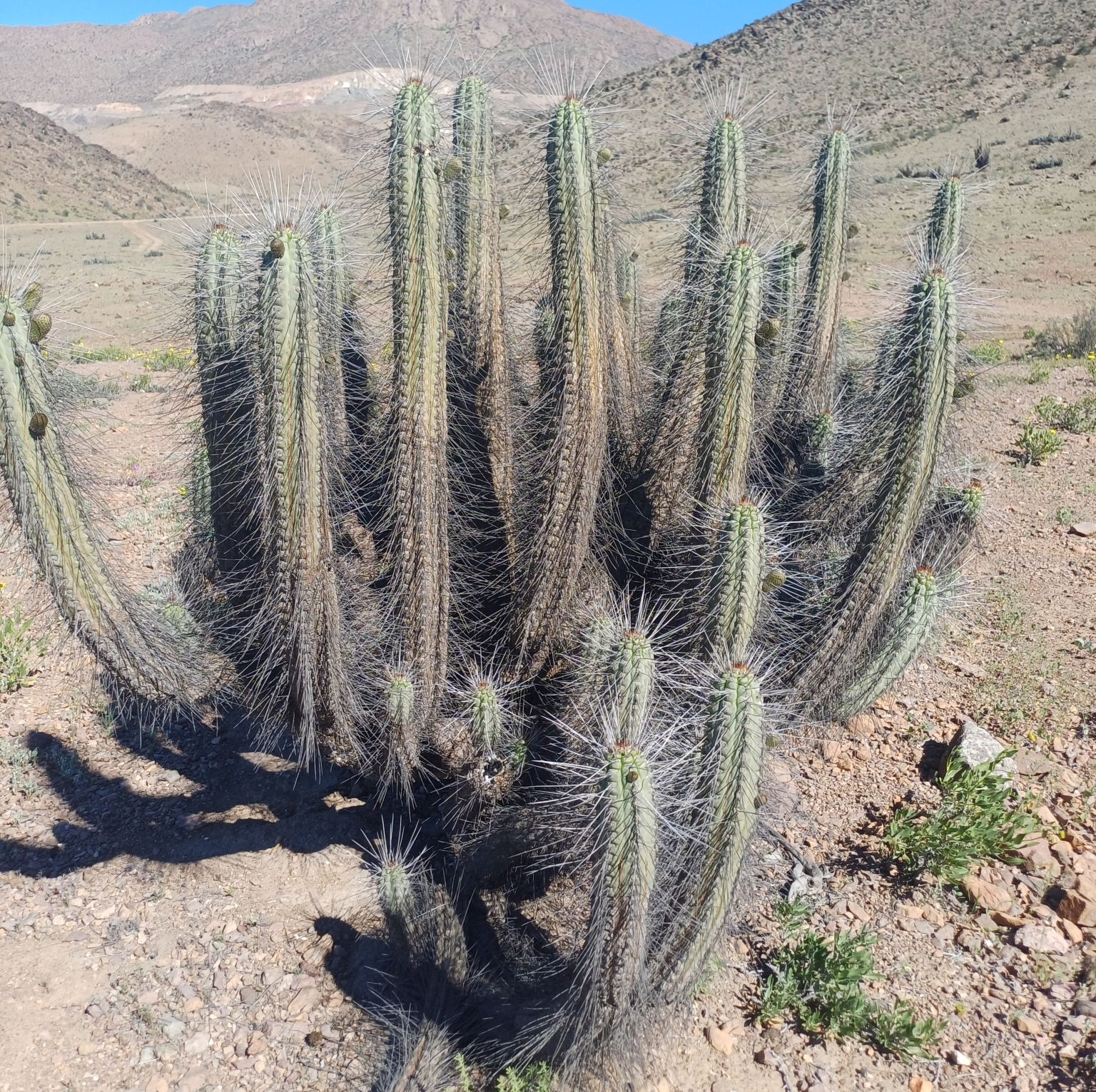
Plant growing in Ventanas, Vallenar, Chile

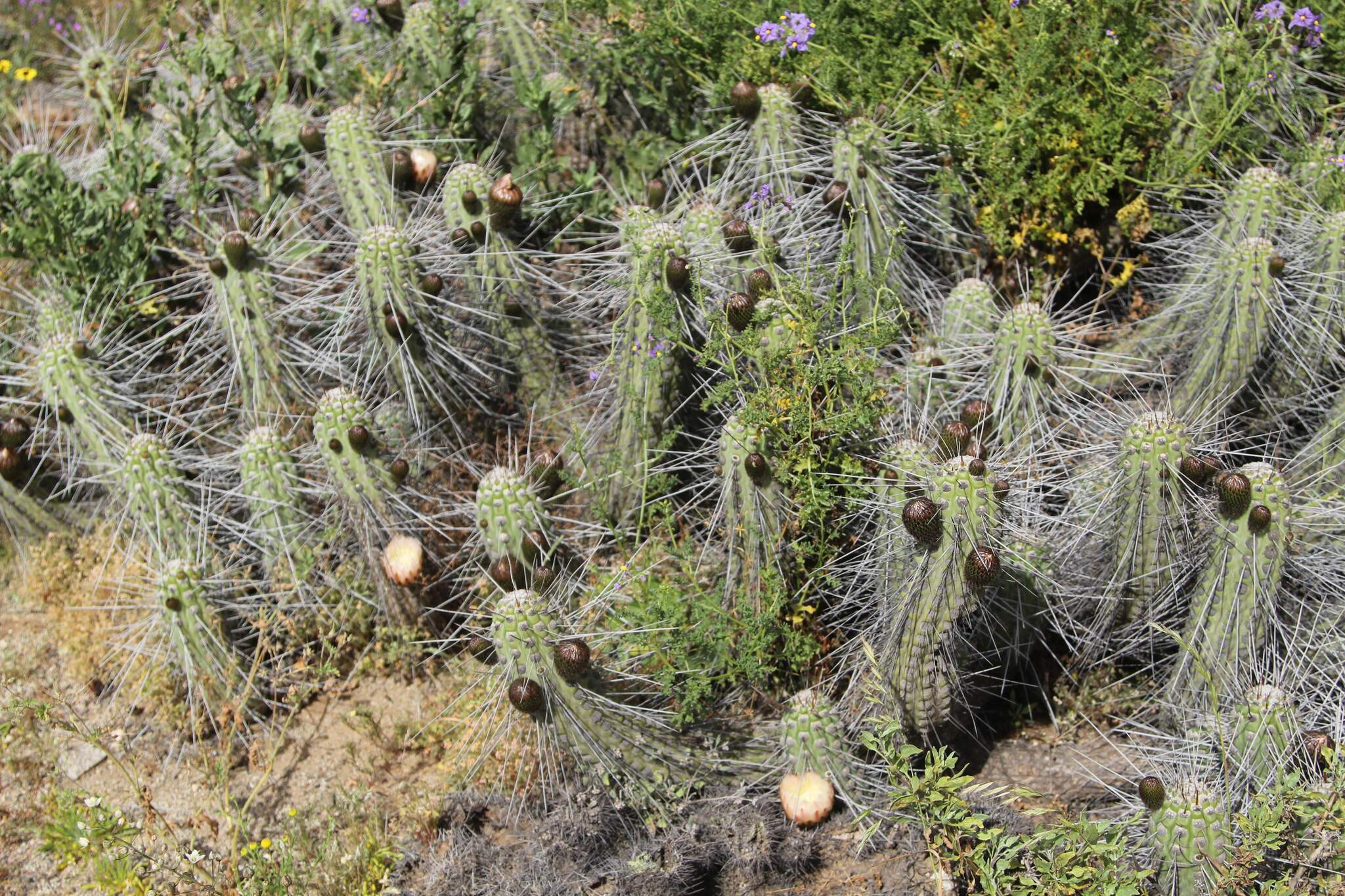
Blooming plant in Freirina, Chile

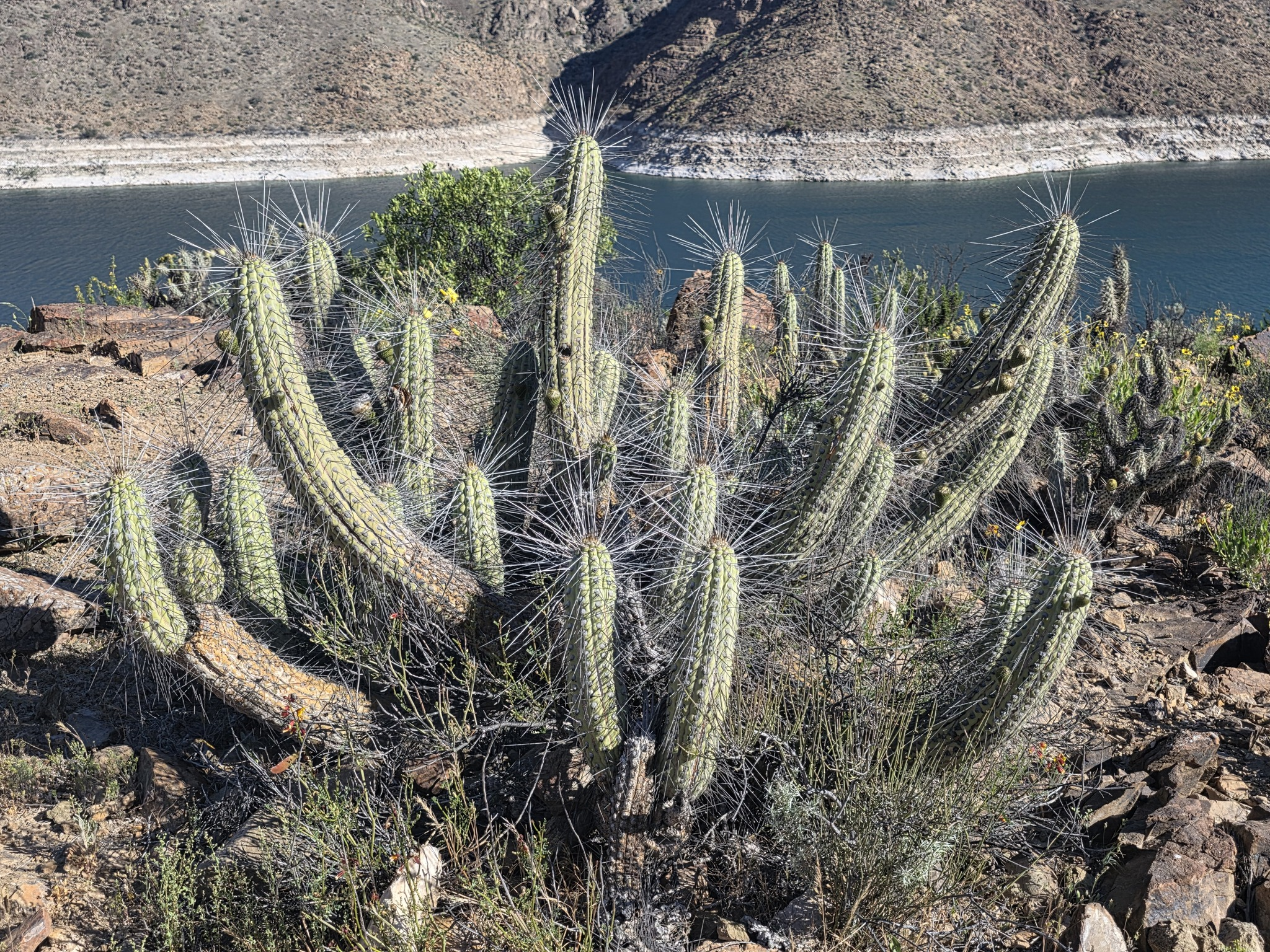
Habitat in Camarones, Vallenar, Chile

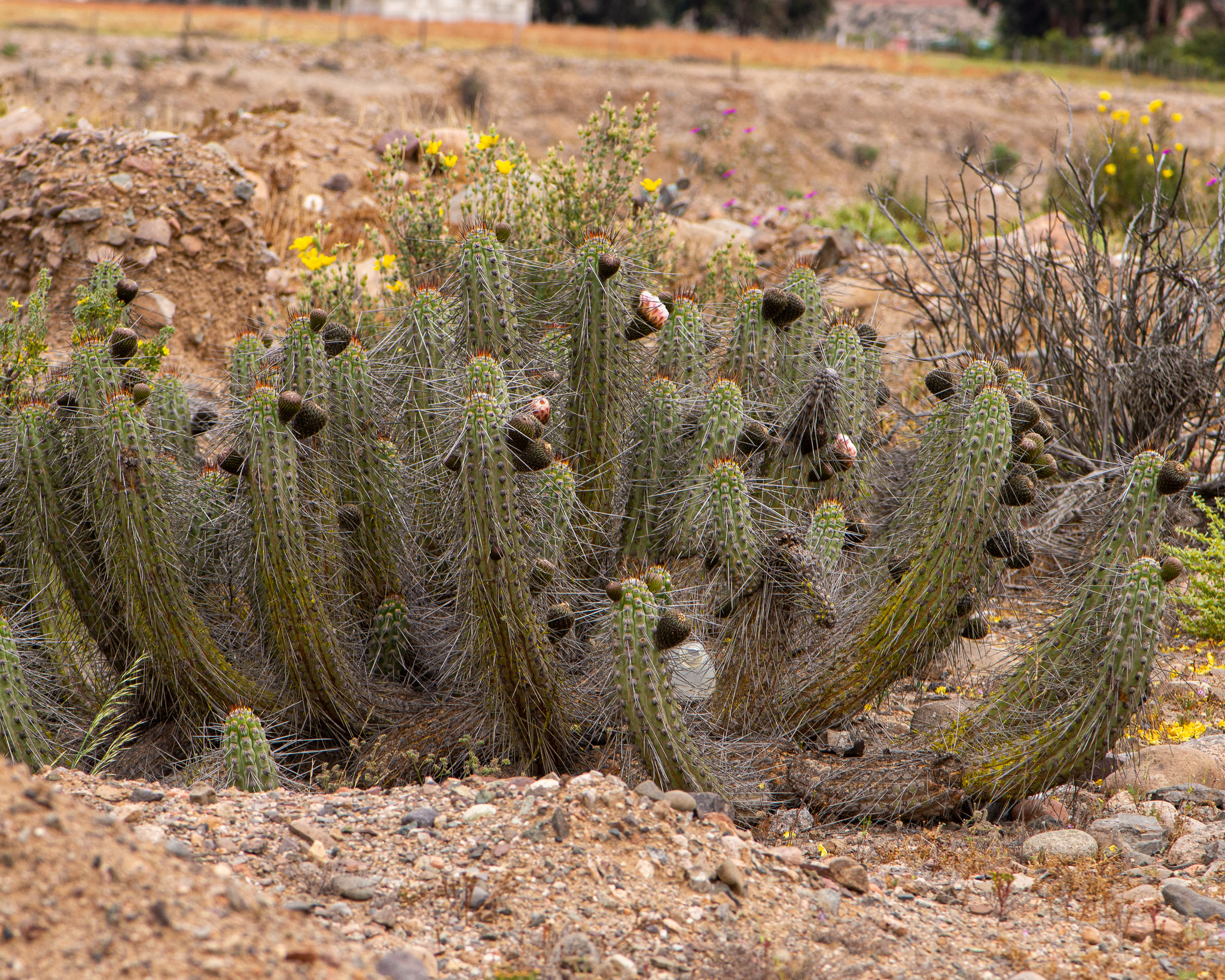
Habitat in Tatara, Freirina, Chile

== Taxonomy ==
This species was first described in 2019 by Helmut Walter and Pablo C. Guerrero in the journal Phytotaxa, the species name vallenarensis refers to Vallenar, a locality in its native Atacama Region where it was discovered.
