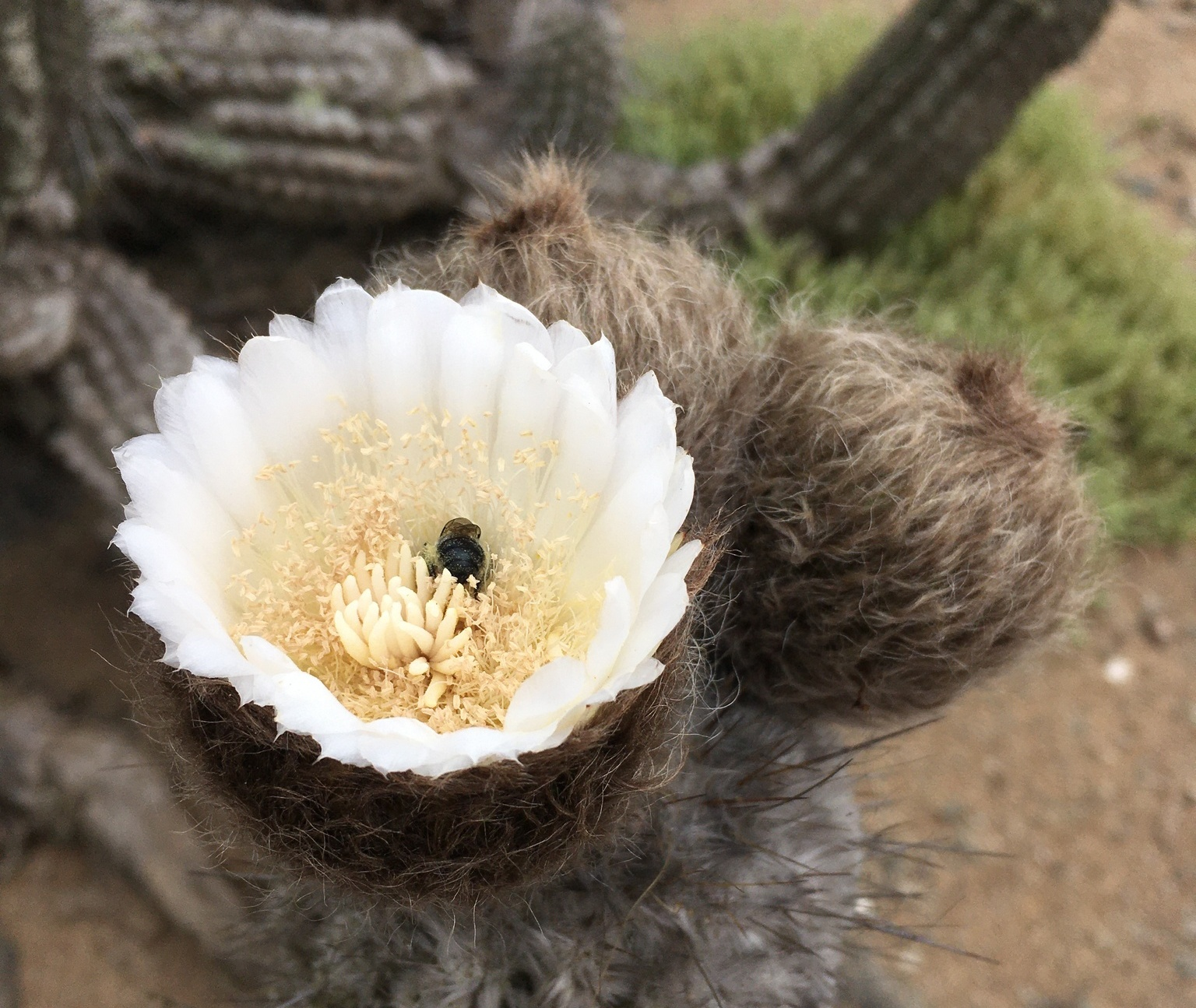

Conservation status
- Least Concern (IUCN 3.1)

Scientific classification
- Kingdom: Plantae
- Clade: Tracheophytes
- Clade: Angiosperms
- Clade: Eudicots
- Order: Caryophyllales
- Family: Cactaceae
- Subfamily: Cactoideae
- Genus: Eulychnia
- Species: E. iquiquensis

Binomial name
- Eulychnia iquiquensis (K.Schum.) Britton & 1920

Synonyms
- Cereus iquiquensis K.Schum. 1904; Eulychnia breviflora subsp. iquiquensis (K.Schum.) D.R.Hunt 2002; Eulychnia aricensis F.Ritter 1964; Eulychnia iquiquensis var. pullilana F.Ritter 1980; Eulychnia morromorenoensis F.Ritter 1980

= Eulychnia iquiquensis =

Species of cactus

Eulychnia iquiquensis is a species of Eulychnia found in Chile.

== Description ==
This tree-like cactus typically grows to 2 to 4 meters tall, occasionally reaching 7 meters, with a short trunk and erect habit. Branching occurs from about 1.5 meters above the ground, mostly from the base, resulting in steep branches. The shoots are dark greenish-gray and measure 7 to 10 cm in diameter.

The stems are characterized by 12 to 13 ribs, sometimes 14, with less common occurrences of 10 or 11. These ribs are about 2 cm high, feature flat, parallel flanks, and have notches separated by narrow grooves. The areoles, approximately 8 mm in diameter, initially have brown felt that quickly turns grayish. These areoles are situated on the upper flank of tubercles, extending to the upper notch and spaced 4 to 8 mm apart.

Spines, numbering 10 to 20 per areole without clear differentiation between central and radial types, are generally straight. Shorter, needle-shaped spines reach about 1 cm or less. Among these, 2 to 4 central spines are notably longer and robust, measuring 3 to 10 cm, and are black, aging to grayish. Thinner spines exhibit yellowish or brownish tones. In taller specimens, spines become more bristly and divergent, and the areoles appear closer together.

Flowers emerge at the stem apex or slightly below, opening only during the day and are odorless or faintly fragrant. They measure 5.5 to 6.5 cm in length with a 5 to 6 cm opening. The petals are white, with outer petals and to a lesser extent inner ones, having fine reddish-brown tips. These petals are 2 to 2.5 cm long, about 5 mm wide, with a short apex that varies from pointed to rounded, and their widest point is near the tip. Only the lower third of the petals is covered in woolly hairs externally, and internally by anthers; the petals remain erect.

The ovary is nearly circular, measuring approximately 2.5 to 3 cm in length and similar in thickness at its upper part. It is covered in dense, narrow greenish scales with brownish tips and long, white, woolly hairs, occasionally light yellow or yellowish-brown. The ovary wall is about 8 mm thick. A honey-yellow nectary, 1 to 1.5 mm high, forms a ring around the style base. The floral tube is bowl-shaped, about 1.5 cm long and 2.8 to almost 4 cm wide, with an exterior similar to the ovary, covered in hairs 2 to 3 cm long.

Numerous white stamens, 1 to 1.5 cm long, are present, with upper stamens being shorter and erect, while lower ones incline towards the style. Cream-colored anthers are mostly at the same height, around the middle of the petals, and are distributed along the floral tube. The pollen is light yellow. The white, robust style measures about 6 mm thick at the base, tapering to 3 to 5 mm at the top, and is approximately 2 cm long. This length includes 7 to 10 mm of 27 to 35 spreading, pale yellow stigmatic lobes that typically reach or exceed the anthers.

The fruit is nearly spherical, green, and measures 6 to 8.5 cm in length and 5 to 6.5 cm in diameter. It is covered in dense white wool similar to the ovary and contains juicy, acidic white or pinkish pulp. The black seeds, approximately 1.7 mm long, 1.0 mm wide, and 0.5 mm thick, have a slight grayish coating and a matte surface, with a pointed basal apex and a subtle dorsal keel. The testa exhibits fine, indistinct tuberculation, occasionally with slight dorsal transverse ribs. The oblong, whitish hilum is located ventrally to subventrally.

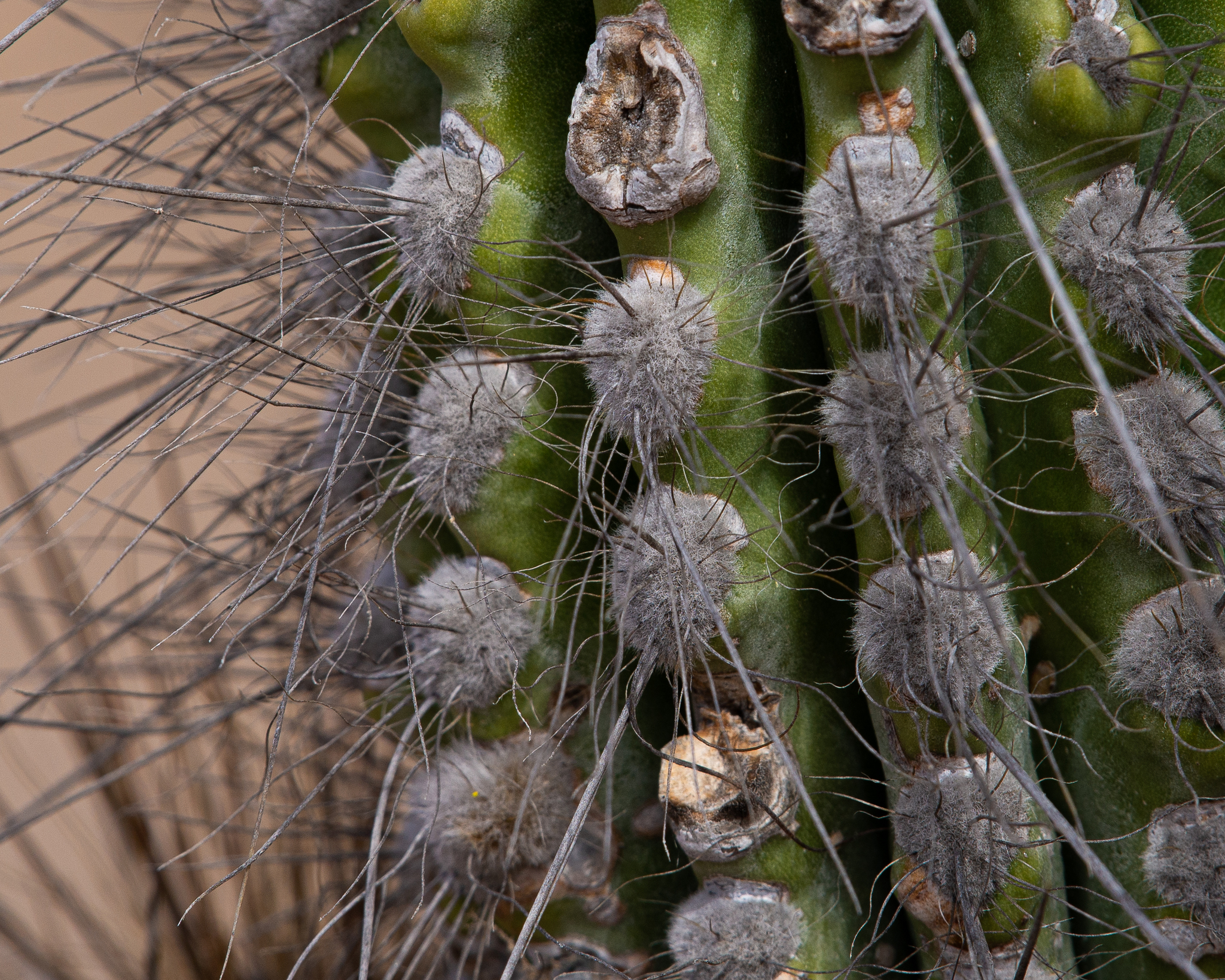
spines

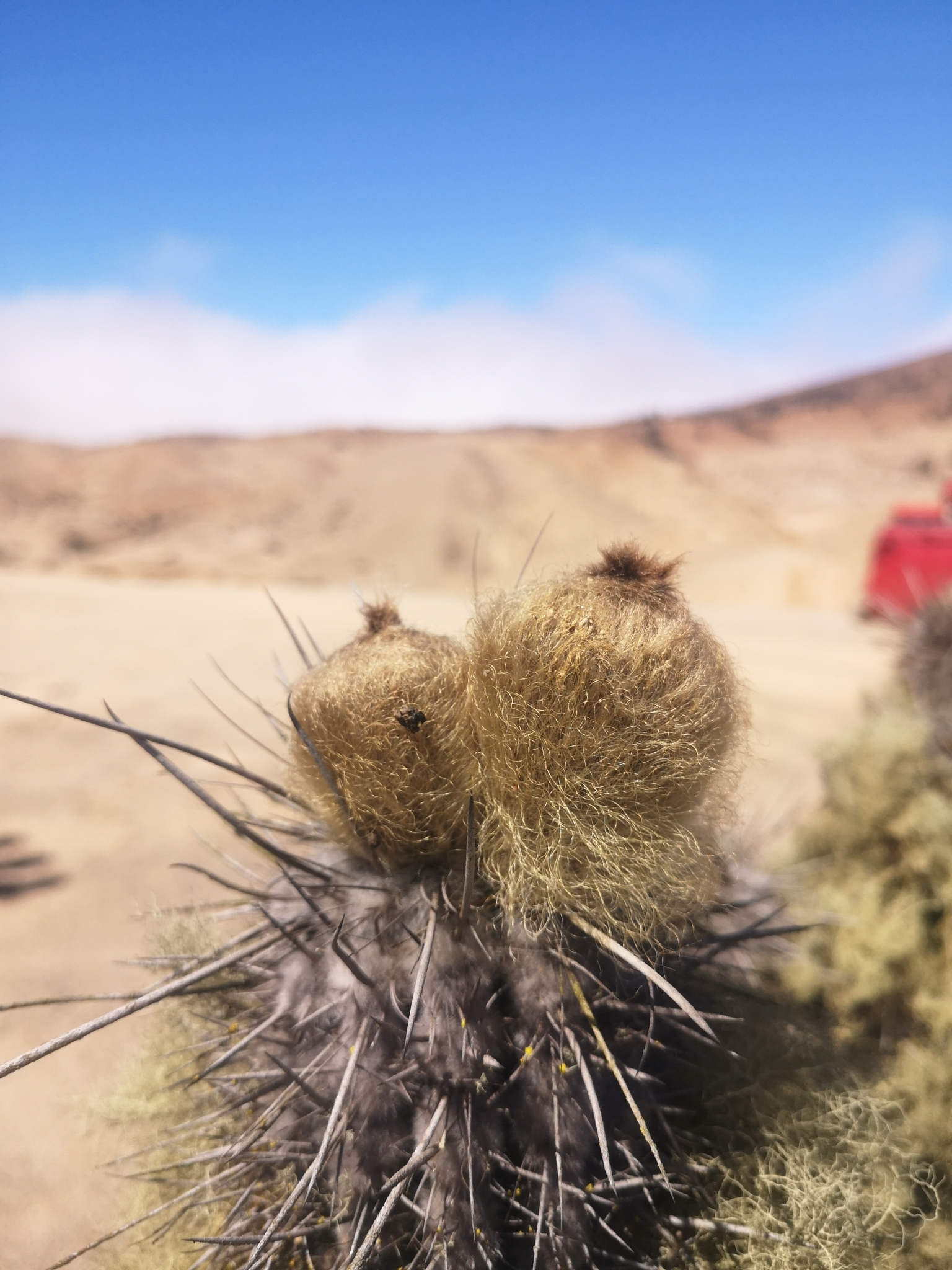
Fruits

== Distribution ==
Eulychnia iquiquensis is native to a narrow coastal strip in northern Chile, specifically the Tarapacá, Antofagasta, and Atacama regions. This species thrives in desert and dry scrub biomes, from near sea level up to approximately 1100 meters in altitude, primarily on coastal hills influenced by the camanchaca fog, which is a crucial moisture source in this arid region with minimal rainfall. Eulychnia iquiquensis is easily recognized by its size and visibility, being the only regularly occurring woody plant in these coastal environments and does not extend into the interior pampa.

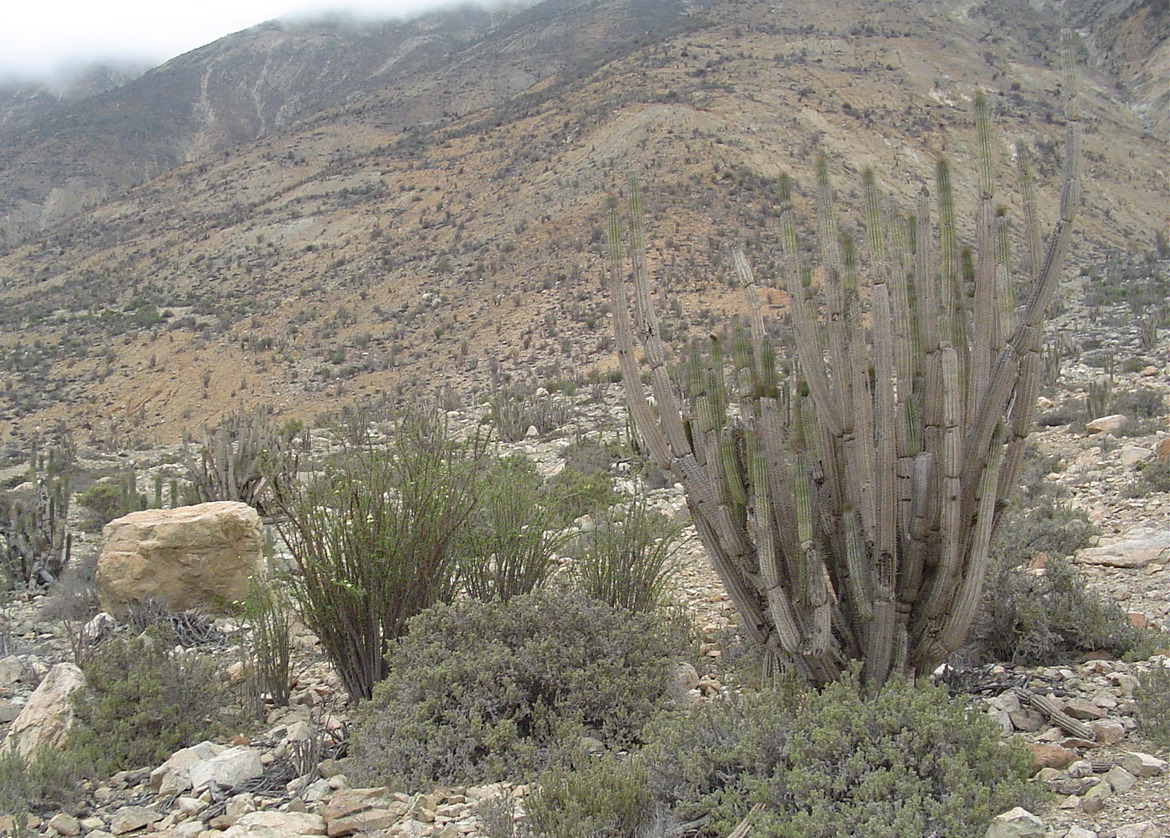
Habitat in Paposo, Taltal, Chile

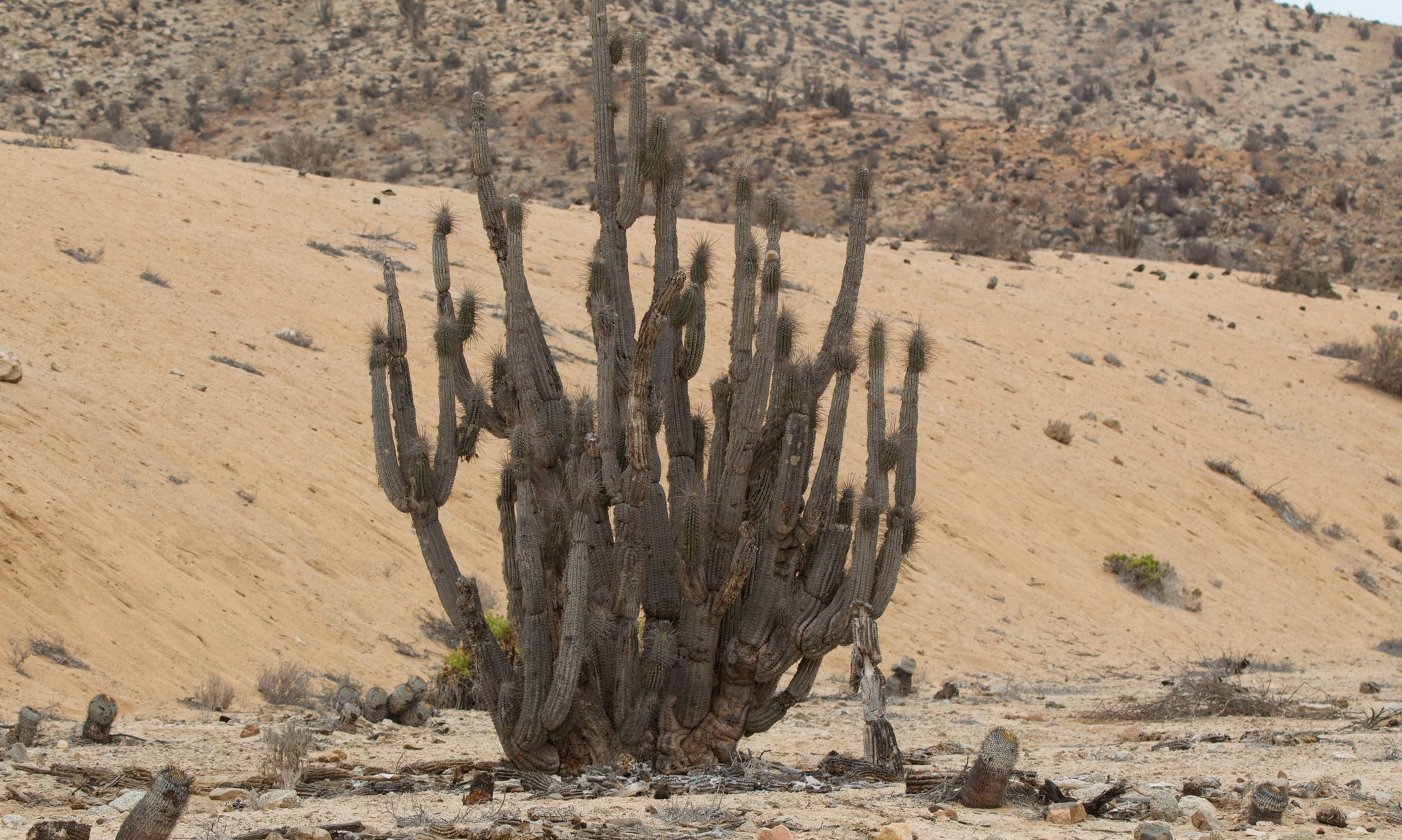
Habitat in Pan de Azúcar, Chañaral, Chile

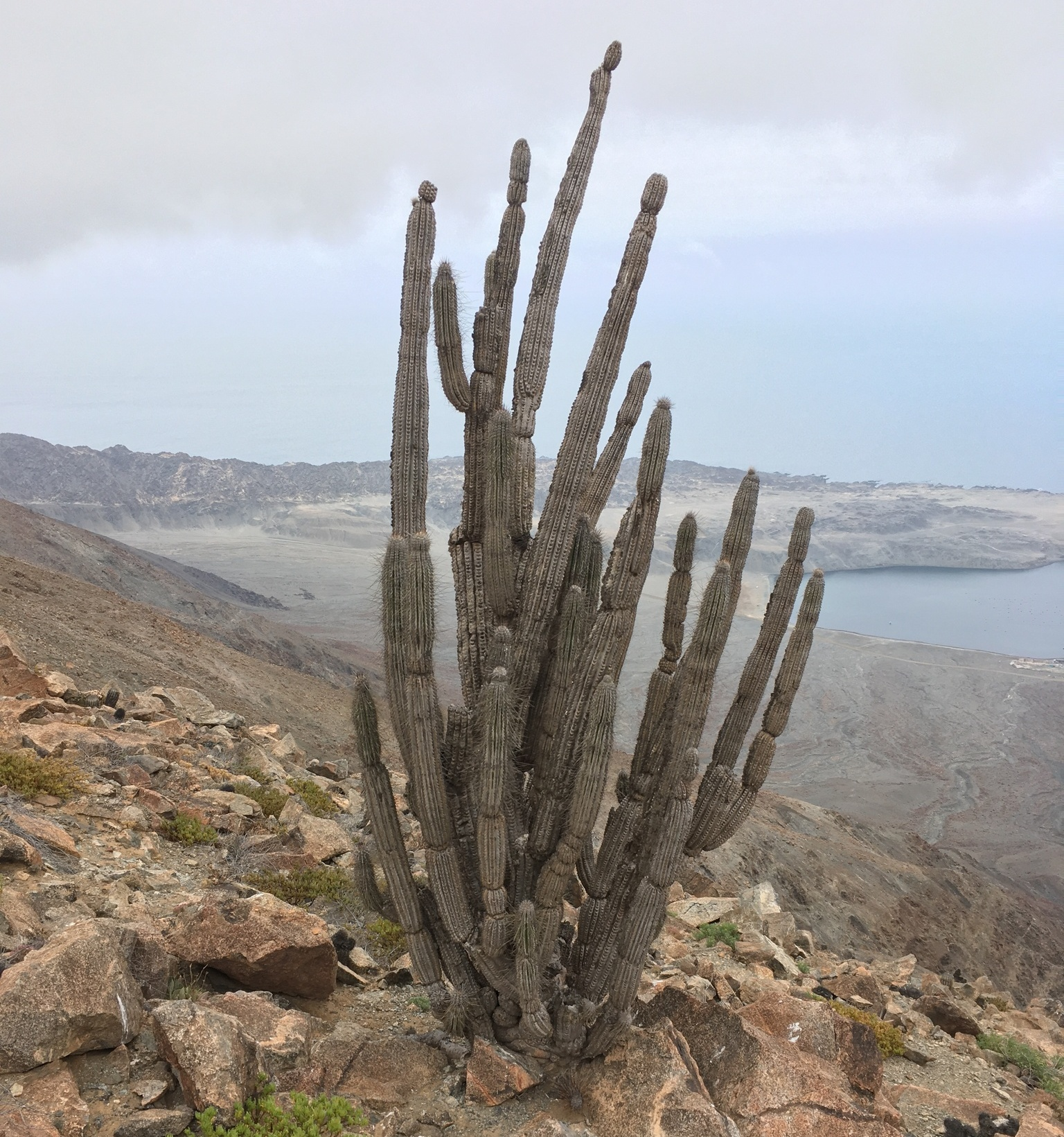
Habitat in Camino del Yeso, Antofagasta, Chile

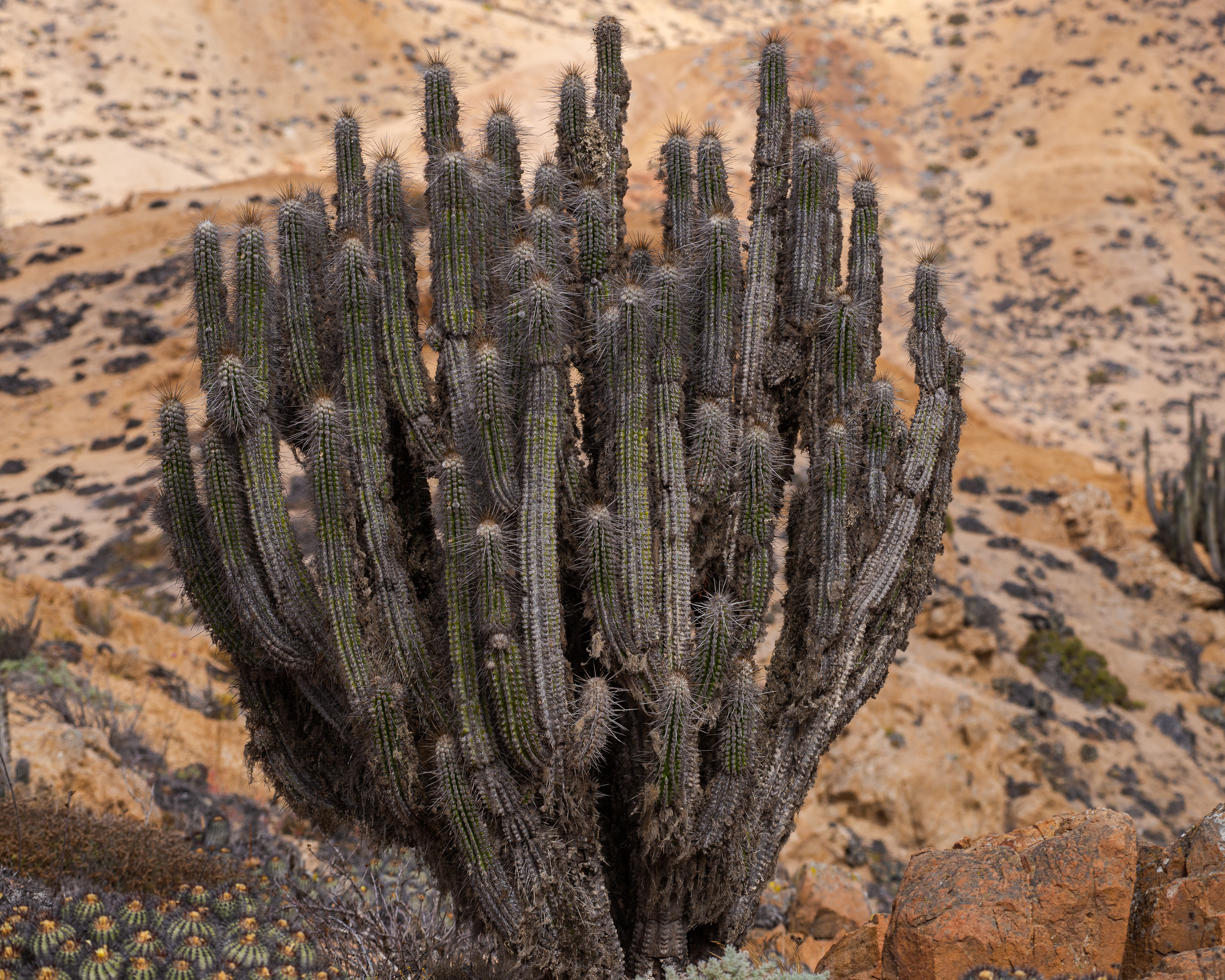
Plant in Guanillos, Región de Antofagasta

== Taxonomy ==
This species was first described as Cereus iquiquensis in 1904 by Karl Moritz Schumann, the species was later transferred to the genus Eulychnia by Nathaniel Lord Britton and Joseph Nelson Rose in 1920. The geographical epithet "iquiquensis" refers to the province of Iquique, in the Tarapacá region of Chile, where the species was discovered.
