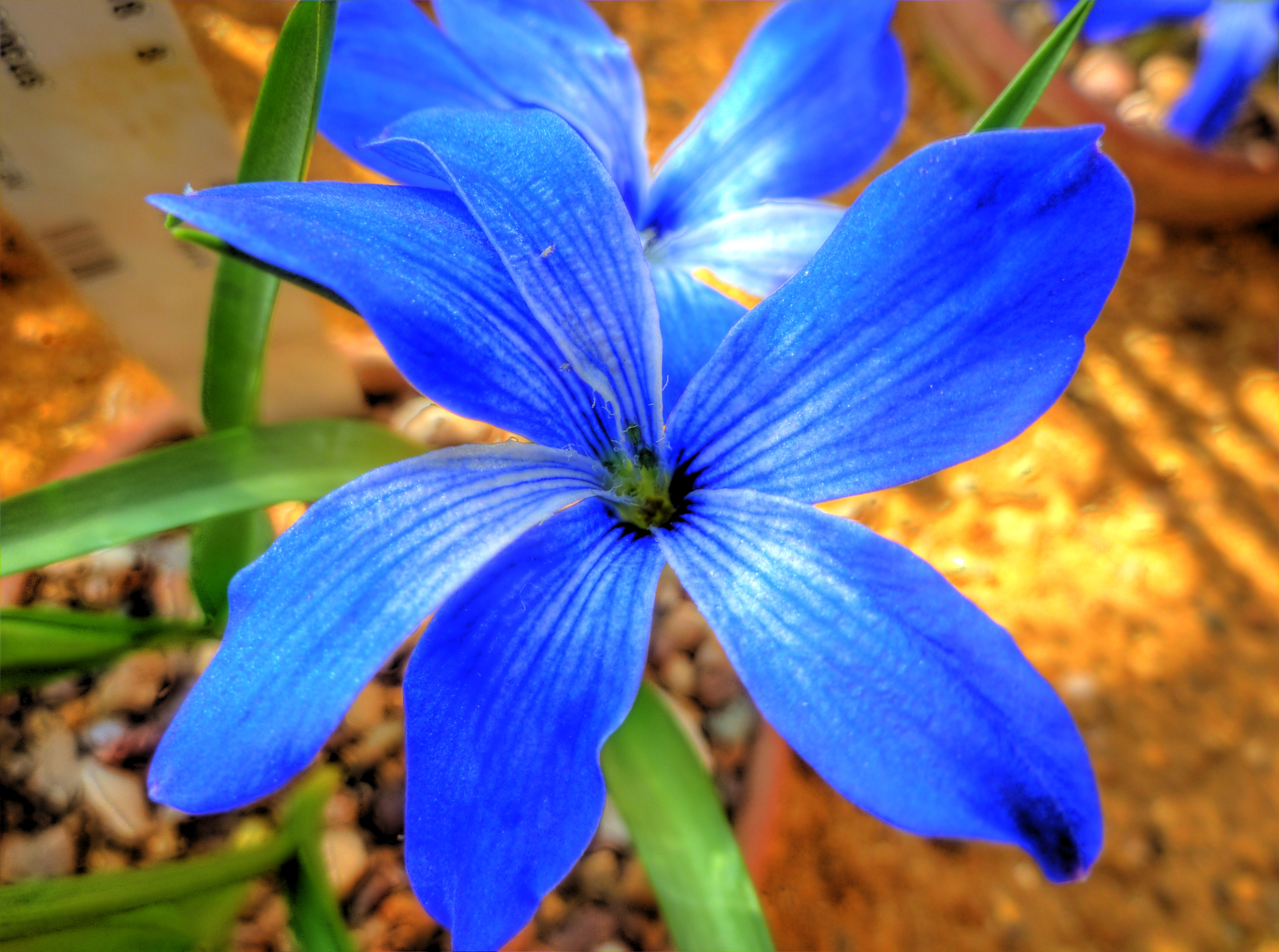

Scientific classification
- Kingdom: Plantae
- Clade: Tracheophytes
- Clade: Angiosperms
- Clade: Monocots
- Order: Asparagales
- Family: Tecophilaeaceae
- Genus: Tecophilaea; Bertero ex Colla

Type species
- Tecophilaea violiflora Bertero ex Colla

Species
- See here
- It is endemic to Peru and Chile

Synonyms
- Distrepta Miers without description; Poeppigia Kunze ex Rchb. without description; Phyganthus Poepp. & Endl.

= Tecophilaea =

Genus of plants

Tecophilaea is a genus of cormous plants in the family Tecophilaeaceae. There are two known species, both native to southern South America.

== Description ==
=== Vegetative characteristics ===
Tecophilaea are perennial, cormous herbs

=== Generative characteristics ===
The trilocular capsule fruit bears many seeds.

== Taxonomy ==
It was validly published by Luigi Aloysius Colla in 1836 based on previous work by Carlo Luigi Giuseppe Bertero. The type species is Tecophilaea violiflora Bertero ex Colla. It is the type genus of its family Tecophilaeaceae Leyb.

=== Etymology ===
The genus Tecophilaea was named after the botanical artist Tecophila Billotti, the daughter of the Italian botanist Luigi Aloysius Colla, who published the genus.

=== Species ===
Species

| Image | Scientific name | Distribution |
|---|---|---|
| | Tecophilaea cyanocrocus Leyb. | Santiago Province in Chile |
| | Tecophilaea violiflora Bertero ex Colla | Lima Province in Peru, Coquimbo + Santiago Provinces in Chile |

== Conservation ==
Tecophilaea cyanocrocus was believed to be extinct in the wild, but was rediscovered in 2001.

== Distribution ==
It is endemic to Peru and Chile.
