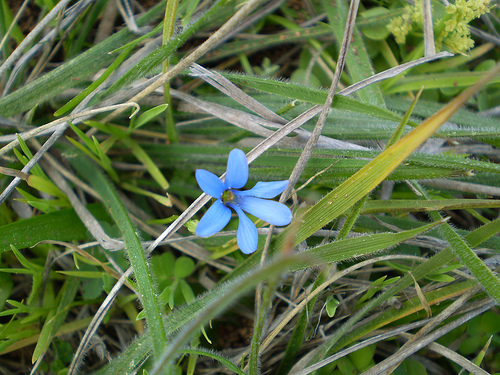

Scientific classification
- Kingdom: Plantae
- Clade: Tracheophytes
- Clade: Angiosperms
- Clade: Monocots
- Order: Asparagales
- Family: Tecophilaeaceae
- Genus: Tecophilaea
- Species: T. violiflora

Binomial name
- Tecophilaea violiflora Bertero ex Colla
- It is native to Peru and Chile

Synonyms
- List: Zephyra violiflora (Bertero ex Colla) Ravenna; Distrepta vaginata Miers; Phyganthus vernus Poepp. & Endl.; Poeppigia chilensis Kunze ex Steud.; Tecophilaea albida Miers; Tecophilaea violiflora var. albida (Miers) Grey; Tecophilaea violiflora f. polyantha Skottsb.

= Tecophilaea violiflora =

Species of plant

Tecophilaea violiflora is a perennial, tuberous herb in the family Tecophilaeaceae native to Peru and Chile.

== Description ==
=== Vegetative characteristics ===
Tecophilaea violiflora is a perennial, tuberous herb with 1–3 lanceolate, 8–20cm long, and 8–13mm wide leaves.

=== Generative characteristics ===
The capsule fruit bears small black seeds.

== Taxonomy ==
It was validly published by Luigi Aloysius Colla in 1836 based on previous work by Carlo Luigi Giuseppe Bertero. The type specimen was collected by Carlo L.G. Bertero. It is the type species of its genus.

=== Etymology ===
The specific epithet violiflora is derived from the genus Viola and from the Latin flos or floris meaning flower, referring to flowers that resemble those of Viola.

== Ecology ==
=== Habitat ===
In Chile, it occurs in relict coastal forests and temperate forests.
