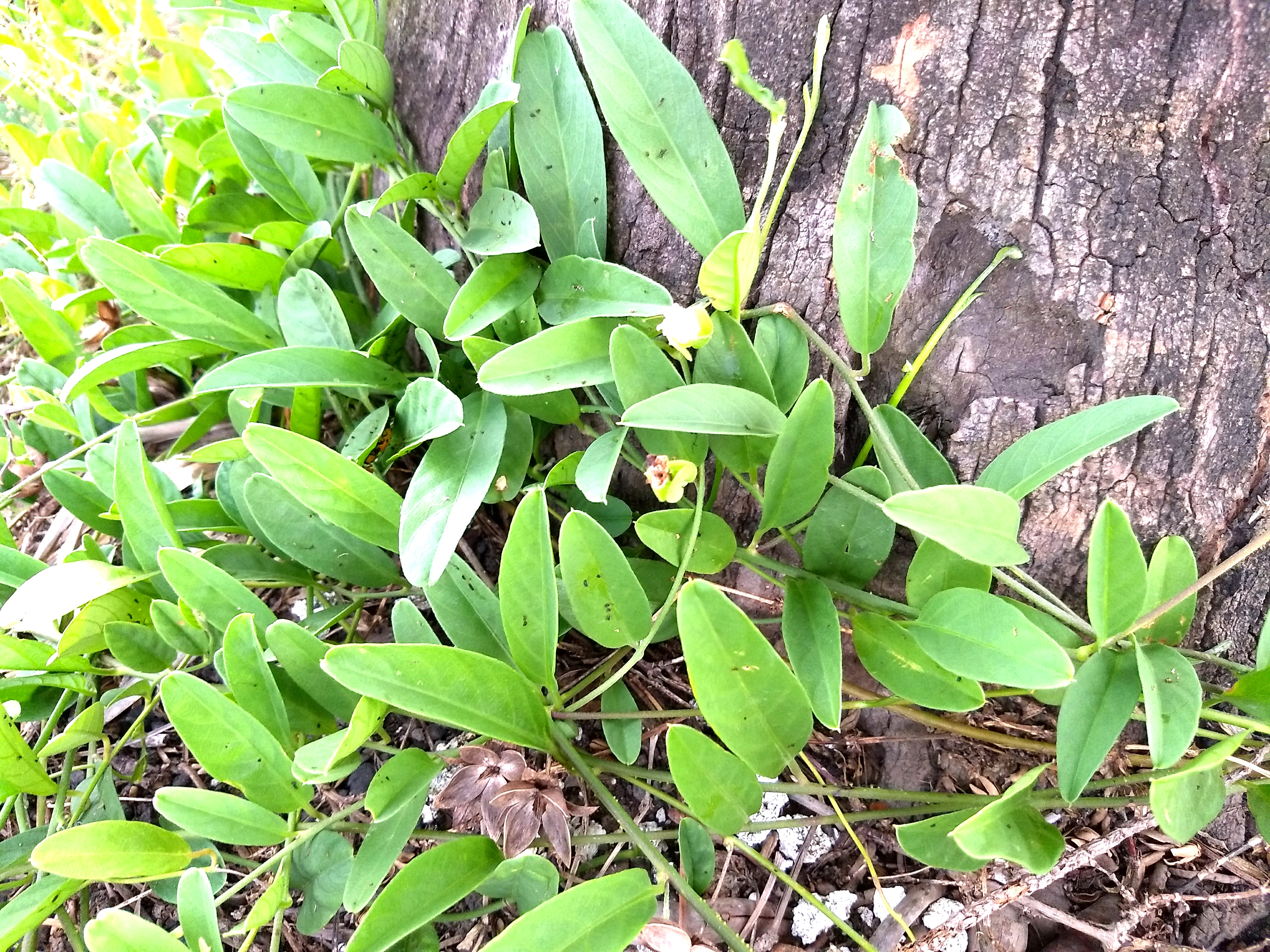

Conservation status
- Least Concern (IUCN 3.1)

Scientific classification
- Kingdom: Plantae
- Clade: Embryophytes
- Clade: Tracheophytes
- Clade: Angiosperms
- Clade: Eudicots
- Clade: Asterids
- Order: Solanales
- Family: Convolvulaceae
- Genus: Aniseia
- Species: A. martinicensis

Binomial name
- Aniseia martinicensis (Jacq.) Choisy

Synonyms
- Aniseia carnea Griseb.; Aniseia cernua Moric.; Aniseia cernua var. glabra Choisy; Aniseia cernua f. parviflora Chodat & Hassl.; Aniseia emarginata (Vahl) Hassk.; Aniseia ensifolia Choisy; Aniseia ensifolia var. minor Choisy; Aniseia martinicensis var. ambigua Hallier f.; Aniseia martinicensis var. nitens (Choisy) O'Donell; Aniseia minor (Choisy) J.A.McDonald; Aniseia nitens Choisy; Aniseia salicifolia (Desr.) Choisy; Aniseia tomentosa Meisn.; Aniseia uniflora (Burm.f.) Choisy; Calystegia mucronata Spreng. ex Choisy; Convolvulus acetosifolius Steud.; Convolvulus bentira Buch.-Ham. ex Dillwyn; Convolvulus emarginatus Vahl; Convolvulus linkii F.Dietr.; Convolvulus martinicensis Jacq.; Convolvulus martinicensis var. cernuus (Moric.) Kuntze; Convolvulus martinicensis var. nitens (Choisy) Kuntze; Convolvulus pterocarpus Bertero ex Colla; Convolvulus rheedii Wall.; Convolvulus salicifolius Desr.; Convolvulus uniflorus Burm.f.; Ipomoea cernua (Moric.) Hassl.; Ipomoea cernua f. acutifolia Hassl.; Ipomoea cernua var. genuina Hassl.; Ipomoea cernua f. obtusifolia Hassl.; Ipomoea cernua f. paraguariensis Hassl.; Ipomoea cernua subf. subsericea Hassl.; Ipomoea lanceolata G.Don; Ipomoea martinicensis (Jacq.) G.Mey.; Ipomoea pterocarpa G.Don; Ipomoea ruyssenii A.Chev.; Ipomoea salicifolia Desr. ex Steud.; Ipomoea uniflora Benth. & Hook.f. ex Drake; Ipomoea uniflora (Burm.f.) Roem. & Schult.; Jacquemontia chiapensis Brandegee; Tirtalia emarginata Raf.

= Aniseia martinicensis =

Species of flowering plant

Aniseia martinicensis is a species of herb climber in the Convolvulaceae family. Native to subtropical and tropical America, it has been introduced to the tropics and sub-tropics of the Pacific Islands, Australia, Asia, and Africa. It is usually eaten as a supplementary vegetable. Even though it grows around the world, in a variety of habitats, it is a rare plant.

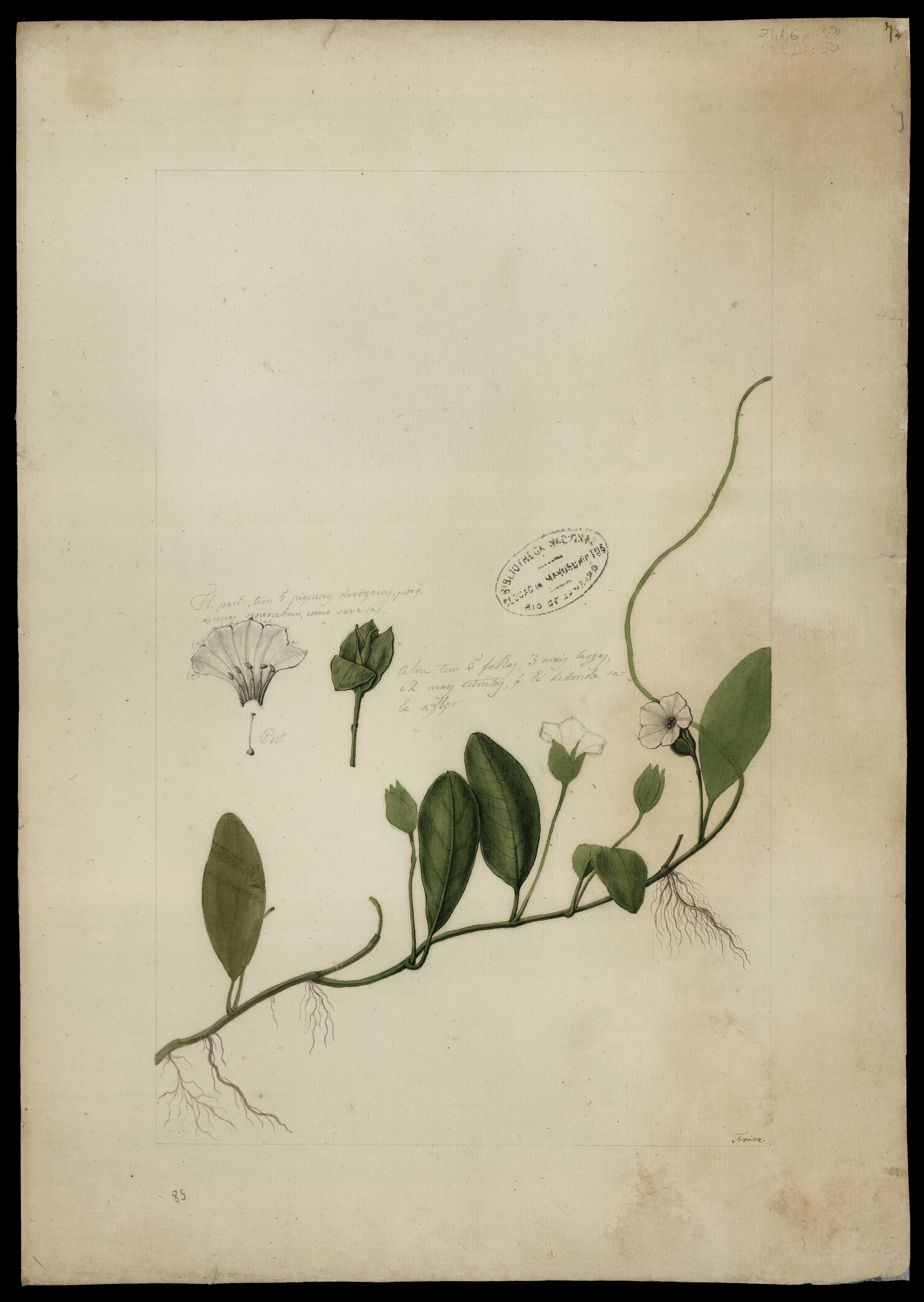
Aniseia martinicensis in Coleção Brasiliana Iconográfica

== Description ==
The taxon grows as a vine, with a herbaceous stem. The stem can be smooth to sparsely hairy. The hairless leaves are narrowly lanceolate, with an obtuse to acute base and an obtuse, mucronate apex, an entire margin, and 4–8 cm (1.6–3.1 in) long. The acuminate flowers are mainly solitary on the leaf axil, with peduncles 5 cm (2.0 in) long. Five broadly ovate sepals, where the outer 2 are broader than inner 3 and are some 12-17mm long. The white corollas are campanulate and are some 25-30mm long. Fruits are ovoid and capsular, some 2cm long, and are subtended by the enlarged calyx. The black seeds are smooth.

In Bangladesh, it flowers from September to November.

== Distribution ==
The plant is native to tropical and subtropical America but is widely introduced/naturalised in the other sub-/tropical parts of the world. Countries and regions that it is native to are: Argentina (northeast); Brasil (North, Northeast, South, Southeast, West-Central); Paraguay; Bolivia; Peru; Ecuador; Colombia; Venezuela; Guyana; Suriname; French Guiana; Panamá; Costa Rica; Trinidad-Tobago; Nicaragua; Windward Islands; El Salvador; Honduras; Guatemala; Mexico (Gulf, Southeast, Southwest); Leeward Islands; Belize; Dominican Republic; Jamaica; Puerto Rico; Haiti; Cuba; U.S. (Florida).

Countries and regions where it is recorded as present as a naturalised/introduced plant are: Tonga; Fiji; Solomon Islands; Australia (Queensland, Northern Territory; Papua Niugini (eastern New Guinea); Caroline Islands; Indonesia (West Papua, Maluku Islands, Sulawesi, Kalimantan, Jawa, Sumatera); Philippines; Nansei-shoto/Ryukyu Islands; Malaysia (Sabah, Sarawak, Peninsular Malaysia); Thailand; Cambodia; Vietnam; Laos; Myanmar; India (including Assam); East Himalaya; Bangladesh; Nepal; Sri Lanka; Madagascar; Mozambique; Tanzania; Democratic Republic of the Congo/Congo-Kinshasa; Central African Republic; Angola; Chad; Republic of the Congo/Congo-Brazzaville; Cameroon; Niger; Nigeria; Gabon; Benin; Ghana; Côte d'Ivoire; Liberia; Guinea; Sierra Leone; Senegal; Guinea-Bissau

== Habitat and ecology ==
The plant grows in a variety of habitats, from humid to dry and semi-arid, including flooded forests and grasslands, from 0 to 499m altitude.

It grows as an annual, along marshy ridges in swamps, requiring moist ground, it is often abundant in rice fields, tends to commoner near coasts, it can also be found in deciduous forests, grasslands, and marine intertidal areas.

In Manikganj District, central Bangladesh, the taxon is found in a small number of the fallow areas of homesteads, and is regarded as critically endangered.

== Conservation ==
As noted top right, the plant is rated as Least Concern for conservation. It is widely distributed around the world without any known threats. However it is a rare plant and therefore a level of concern is conferred to it.

== Vernacular names ==
- bejuco de pescado (Argentine Spanish)
- whitejacket (U.S. English)
- ânnda:t trâkuët (="monitor tongue", alluding to the shape of the leaves similarity to varanid's tongues, Khmer language)
- shadamati (Bengali, Bangladesh)

== Uses ==
The leaves of the species are sometimes gathered as a vegetable, particularly in Indonesia and Malaysia. The seeds are used in a traditional medicine system.

In Cambodia, during the famine years of the Khmer Rouge, the whole plant, stem included, was cooked and eaten. It is still used as supplementary vegetable (when diversity of food is desired) in the 'flooded village' (of Stilt houses) of Peam Ta Our, in the Tonle Sap floodplain, Puok District, Siem Reap province, it is eaten raw or cooked in soups.

== History ==
This species was named by the Swiss botanist Jacques Denys Choisy (1799–1859) in 1837. Choisy was, as well as a botanist, a member of the clergy and a theologian/philosopher. The species description was published in Mémoires de la Société de Physique et d'Histoire Naturelle de Genève (Geneva & Paris). Choisy's name superseded that of Nederlander-Austrian botanist Nikolaus Joseph von Jacquin (1727–1817), who named the taxa Convolvulus martinicensis in 1763.
