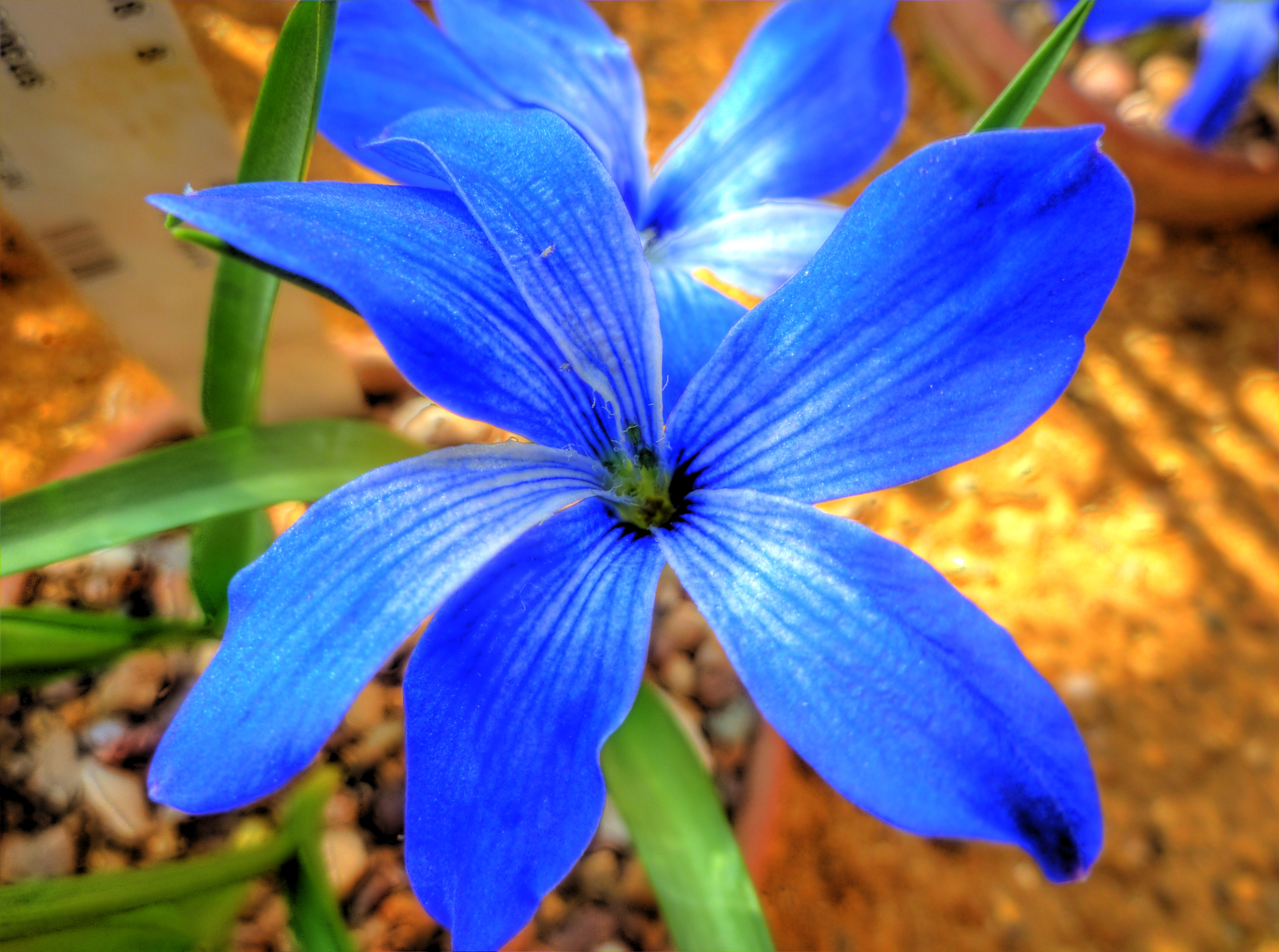

Scientific classification
- Kingdom: Plantae
- Clade: Tracheophytes
- Clade: Angiosperms
- Clade: Monocots
- Order: Asparagales
- Family: Tecophilaeaceae
- Genus: Tecophilaea
- Species: T. cyanocrocus

Binomial name
- Tecophilaea cyanocrocus Leyb.

= Tecophilaea cyanocrocus =

Species of plant

Tecophilaea cyanocrocus, the Chilean blue crocus, is a flowering perennial plant that is native to Chile, growing at 2,000 to 3,000 m (6,600 to 9,800 ft) elevation on dry, stony slopes in the Andes mountains. Although it had survived in cultivation due to its use as a greenhouse and landscape plant, it was believed to be extinct in the wild due to overcollecting, overgrazing, and general destruction of habitat, until it was rediscovered in 2001.

== Description ==
Both the specific epithet cyanocrocus and the common name "Chilean blue crocus" highlight the plant's passing resemblance to the true crocus. However, the two plants are not closely related, and there is no blue crocus, either in the wild or in cultivation.

In its native habitat, the plant blooms from October to November, which is springtime in the Southern Hemisphere. In northern climates, it flowers from February to March.

Tecophilaea cyanocrocus grows on stems up to 4 in (10 cm) tall, with 1-3 linear fleshy leaves. The single flowers are approximately 1 in (2.5 cm) across, goblet shaped, and are an unusual deep gentian blue color, with a whitish center. The root is a nearly spherical corm with a fibrous cover.

== Taxonomy ==
The genus Tecophilaea was named after Tecofila Billiotti, botanical artist and daughter of the botanist Luigi Aloysius Colla of Turin. There are only two species in the genus, the other being Tecophilaea violiflora. The genus was originally placed in the family Amaryllidaceae, eventually being split from that family and becoming the type for the family Tecophilaeaceae.

There are a number of cultivars of tecophilaea. Two of these, 'Violacea' with deep purple flowers, and 'Leichtlinii' with white centers to the flowers, have been in cultivation for many years and are well known among bulb fanciers. By crossing these with each other and with the solid blue type form, other cultivars such as 'Storm Cloud' have been developed in recent years.

The Tecophilaea cyanocrocus cultivar 'Violacea' should not be confused with the species Tecophilaea violiflora.

== Conservation ==
Tecophilaea cyanocrocus was believed to be extinct in the wild, but was rediscovered in 2001.

== Cultivation ==
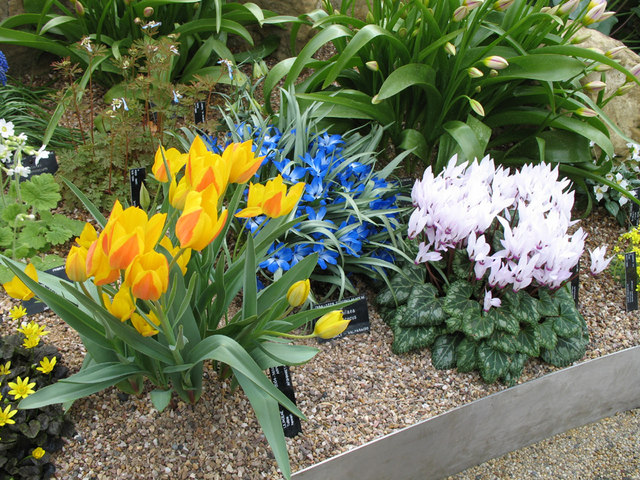
Chilean blue crocus with other alpines (a tulip and a cyclamen) in the Davies Alpine House, Kew

T. cyanocrocus is hardy in USDA Zones 9-10; in essentially frost-free mild climate areas (e.g. Northern New Zealand, Ireland, much of northern California) Tecophilaea cyanocrocus may be successfully grown in open rock gardens exposed to the weather. However, tecophilaea is somewhat frost-tender and cannot withstand hard freezes. Where winter freezes may occur, such as the Pacific Northwest, tecophilaea is best grown in containers that can be protected from very cold weather. Nonetheless, as long as the temperature does not drop much below freezing, tecophilaea is healthier for being kept in the open during winter.

Tecohilaea grows best in a well-drained, circum-neutral (pH 6-7) soil. The corms go dormant during summer, and water should be entirely withheld once the foliage fades after the springtime period of active growth. However, tecophilaea does not benefit from the summer baking that most tulips and many crocuses benefit from. On the contrary, tecophilaea prefers dry, but rather cool soil in summer. Putting the pots in which it is grown in the shade, out of direct sun, is desirable. Water should be withheld until new growth appears in the fall as the soil cools, then increased. In climates with heavy winter rains such as the Pacific Northwest, tecophilaea is best kept out of the rain.

When active growth begins in the fall, tecophilaea will benefit from being fed with a dilute solution of a low-nitrogen fertilizer once every week or two. Foliar feeding with a spray of fertilizer solution is also practical, and has the advantage that the fertilizer will not alter the soil chemistry.

The plant is typically propagated through corm offsets. Seed can be obtained by careful hand pollination of the flowers, but seedlings reach flowering size very slowly.

The foliage of tecophilaea is very scanty and the corms are weakened when the foliage is damaged. Tecophilaea must be diligently protected against pests that may eat the foliage: caterpillars, slugs, and deer, for example.

=== RHS Award ===
Tecophilaea cyanocrocus and the cultivar 'Leichtlinii' have gained the Royal Horticultural Society's Award of Garden Merit.
