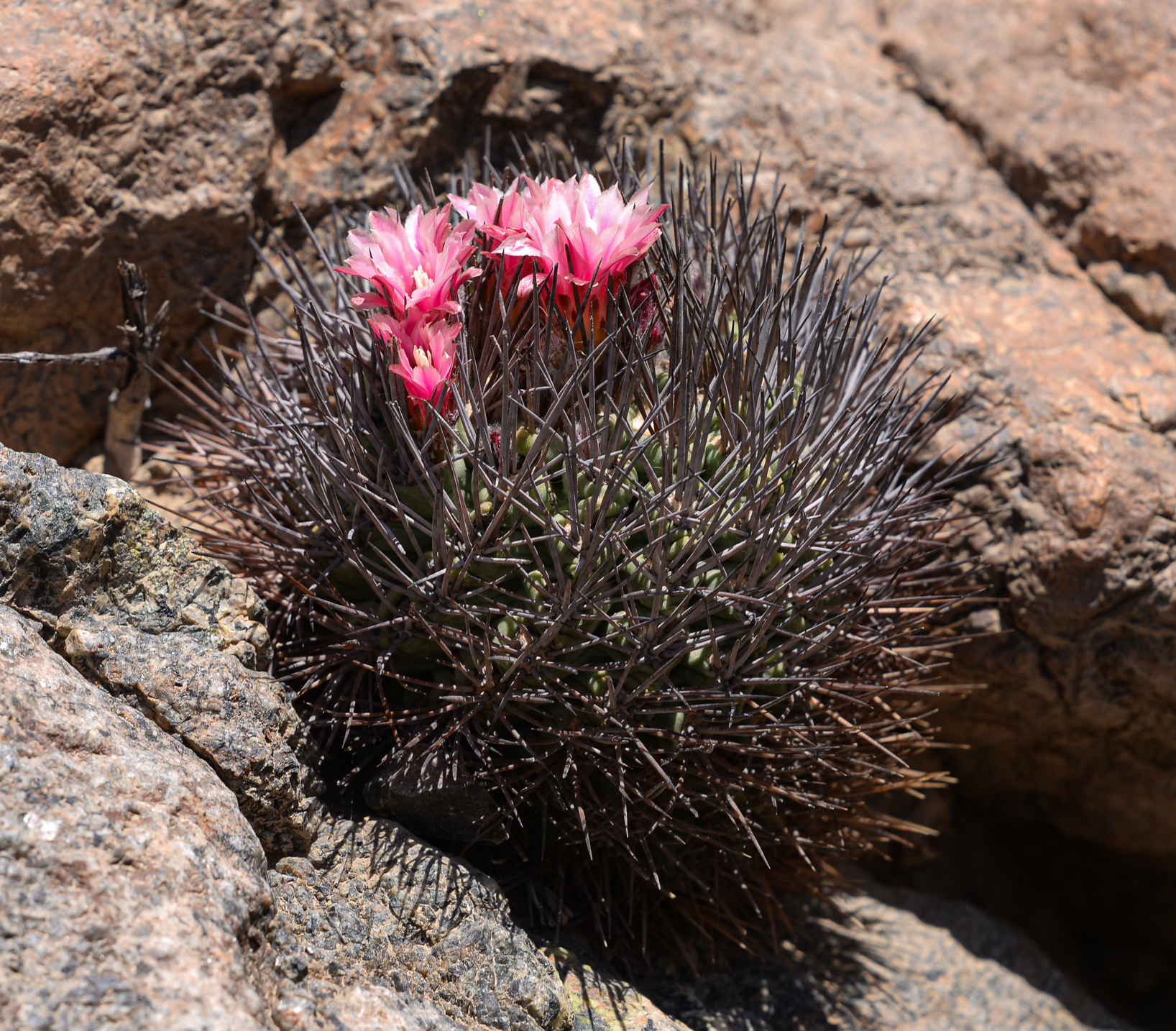
- In bloom

Scientific classification
- Kingdom: Plantae
- Clade: Embryophytes
- Clade: Tracheophytes
- Clade: Spermatophytes
- Clade: Angiosperms
- Clade: Eudicots
- Order: Caryophyllales
- Family: Cactaceae
- Subfamily: Cactoideae
- Genus: Eriosyce
- Species: E. paucicostata

Binomial name
- Eriosyce paucicostata (F.Ritter) Ferryman

Synonyms
- List: Chilenia ebenacantha (Monv. ex Labour.) Backeb.; Chilenia fusca (Muehlenpf.) Backeb.; Echinocactus ebenacanthus Monv. ex Labour.; Echinocactus ebenacanthus var. minor Labour.; Echinocactus fuscus Muehlenpf.; Eriosyce taltalensis var. floccosa (F.Ritter) Katt.; Eriosyce taltalensis subsp. paucicostata (F.Ritter) Katt.; Hildmannia ebenacantha (Monv. ex Labour.) Kreuz. & Buining; Hildmannia fusca (Muehlenpf.) Kreuz. & Buining; Horridocactus echinus (F.Ritter) Backeb.; Horridocactus echinus var. minor (F.Ritter) Backeb.; Horridocactus paucicostatus F.Ritter; Horridocactus paucicostatus subsp. echinus (F.Ritter) Guiggi; Horridocactus paucicostatus subsp. floccosus (F.Ritter) Guiggi; Horridocactus paucicostatus var. viridis F.Ritter; Neochilenia ebenacantha (Monv. ex Labour.) Backeb.; Neochilenia flaviflora Y.Itô; Neochilenia floccosa (F.Ritter) Backeb.; Neochilenia fusca (Muehlenpf.) Backeb.; Neochilenia hankeana var. minor (Labour.) Backeb.; Neochilenia hankeana var. taltalensis Backeb.; Neochilenia hankeana (C.F.Först.) Dölz; Neochilenia paucicostata (F.Ritter) Backeb.; Neochilenia paucicostata var. viridis (F.Ritter) Backeb.; Neoporteria curvispina var. echinus (F.Ritter) Donald & G.D.Rowley; Neoporteria curvispina f. minor (F.Ritter) Donald & G.D.Rowley; Neoporteria ebenacantha (Monv. ex Labour.) Borg; Neoporteria ebenacantha var. minor (Labour.) Oehme; Neoporteria echinus (F.Ritter) Ferryman; Neoporteria echinus var. floccosa (F.Ritter) Ferryman; Neoporteria floccosa (F.Ritter) Lodé; Neoporteria fusca (Muehlenpf.) Britton & Rose; Neoporteria hankeana (C.F.Först.) Donald & G.D.Rowley; Neoporteria hankeana var. minor (Labour.) Donald & G.D.Rowley; Neoporteria hankeana var. taltalensis (Backeb.) Donald & G.D.Rowley; Neoporteria paucicostata (F.Ritter) Donald & G.D.Rowley; Neoporteria paucicostata var. echinus (F.Ritter) A.E.Hoffm.; Neoporteria paucicostata var. floccosa (F.Ritter) A.E.Hoffm.; Nichelia fusca (Muehlenpf.) Bullock; Pyrrhocactus echinus F.Ritter; Pyrrhocactus echinus var. minor F.Ritter; Pyrrhocactus floccosus F.Ritter; Pyrrhocactus floccosus var. minor (F.Ritter) F.Ritter; Pyrrhocactus fuscus (Muehlenpf.) F.Ritter; Pyrrhocactus neohankeanus var. densispinus F.Ritter; Pyrrhocactus neohankeanus var. elongatus F.Ritter; Pyrrhocactus neohankeanus var. flaviflorus F.Ritter; Pyrrhocactus paucicostatus (F.Ritter) F.Ritter; Pyrrhocactus paucicostatus var. viridis (F.Ritter) F.Ritter

= Eriosyce paucicostata =

Species of cactus

Eriosyce paucicostata, the few-ribbed neoporteria, is a species of cactus in the genus Eriosyce, native to southwest Antofagasta in northern Chile. As its synonym Neoporteria paucicostata it has gained the Royal Horticultural Society's Award of Garden Merit.

== Subtaxa ==
The following subspecies are accepted:

- Eriosyce paucicostata subsp. echinus (F.Ritter) Ferryman
- Eriosyce paucicostata subsp. floccosa (F.Ritter) Ferryman
- Eriosyce paucicostata subsp. paucicostata
