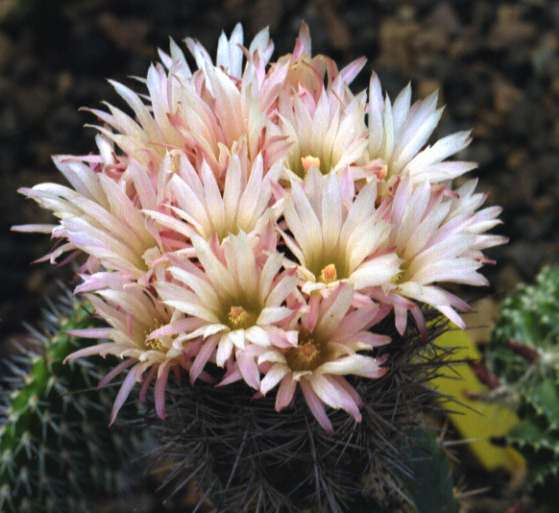

Conservation status
- Least Concern (IUCN 3.1)

Scientific classification
- Kingdom: Plantae
- Clade: Embryophytes
- Clade: Tracheophytes
- Clade: Spermatophytes
- Clade: Angiosperms
- Clade: Eudicots
- Order: Caryophyllales
- Family: Cactaceae
- Subfamily: Cactoideae
- Genus: Eriosyce
- Species: E. curvispina

Binomial name
- Eriosyce curvispina (Bertero ex Colla) Katt., 1994

Synonyms
- Cactus curvispinus Bertero ex Colla 1833; Echinocactus curvispinus (Bertero ex Colla) Gay 1848; Hildmannia curvispina (Bertero ex Colla) Kreuz. & Buining 1941; Horridocactus curvispinus (Bertero ex Colla) Backeb. 1940; Malacocarpus curvispinus (Bertero ex Colla) Britton & Rose 1922; Neoporteria curvispina (Bertero ex Colla) Donald & G.D.Rowley 1966; Pyrrhocactus curvispinus (Bertero ex Colla) A.Berger 1929; Echinocactus froehlichianus K.Schum. 1903; Echinocactus geissei var. albicans Hildm. 1898; Echinocactus soehrensii K.Schum. 1901; Eriosyce curvispina subsp. curvispina; Gymnocalycium froehlichianum (K.Schum.) Osten 1941; Hildmannia froehlichiana (K.Schum.) Kreuz. & Buining 1941; Horridocactus andicola var. mollensis F.Ritter 1959; Horridocactus kesselringianus Dölz in Kakteenkunde 1942: 5 (1942; Horridocactus kesselringianus var. subaequalis Backeb. i1959; Neoporteria curvispina f. albicans (Hildm.) Donald & G.D.Rowley 1966; Neoporteria curvispina var. kesselringiana (Dölz) Donald & G.D.Rowley 1966; Neoporteria curvispina f. mollensis (F.Ritter) Donald & G.D.Rowley 1966; Neoporteria curvispina f. subaequalis (Backeb.) Donald & G.D.Rowley 1966; Neoporteria kesselringiana (Dölz) Hutchison 1955; Neoporteria tuberisulcata var. froehlichiana (K.Schum.) Donald & G.D.Rowley 1966; Pyrrhocactus andicola var. mollensis (F.Ritter) F.Ritter 1959; Pyrrhocactus froehlichianus (K.Schum.) Backeb. in C.Backeberg & F.M.Knuth 1936; Pyrrhocactus kesselringianus (Dölz) F.Ritter 1959

= Eriosyce curvispina =

Species of plant

Eriosyce curvispina is a species of Eriosyce found in Chile
