= Eriosyce aurata =

Conservation status
- Least Concern (IUCN 3.1)

Scientific classification
- Kingdom: Plantae
- Clade: Tracheophytes
- Clade: Angiosperms
- Clade: Eudicots
- Order: Caryophyllales
- Family: Cactaceae
- Subfamily: Cactoideae
- Genus: Eriosyce
- Species: E. aurata

Binomial name
- Eriosyce aurata (Pfeiff.) Backeb.

Synonyms
- Echinocactus auratus Pfeiff. (basionym)

Species of cactus

Eriosyce aurata, commonly known in Spanish as sandillón (which translates as "large watermelon") or asiento de la suegra ("mother-in-law's seat"), is a species of succulent flowering plant in the genus Eriosyce, within the family Cactaceae. It is widespread throughout northern and north-central Chile, from the Atacama Region in the north to the Santiago Metropolitan Region in the south.

== Description ==
Eriosyce aurata is a species of cactus which grows solitarily. Its stem is more or less globose (or, on occasion, slightly elongated) in shape. It is green in color and measures between 10 and 50 cm in diameter, with a hairless or slightly woolly apex. When mature, specimens can become columnar in shape and reach over 90 cm in height. The root system is fibrous. With regards to the general appearance of this plant and its fruits, it somewhat resembles the larger species of the genera Echinocactus and Kroenleinia from Mexico.

Appearance of the plant

The stem has approximately 24 to 42 ribs (or more - this number changes with age). The ribs appear slightly sunken between the areoles. The areoles are large and oval, measuring 14 to 18 mm in length and 6 to 8 mm in diameter. The spines are acicular, curved upwards, and yellowish in color (gray tones appear with age). Of the spines, there are 4 to 8 central spines, which are strongly curved upwards. These measure 2.5 to 4.5 cm in length and 1.5 mm in width, at their bulbous bases. Furthermore, there are 12 to 16 radial spines, which measure 2.5 to 4 cm in length. In young plants, there is only 1 central spine and 8 radial spines; these numbers increase with age and maturity.

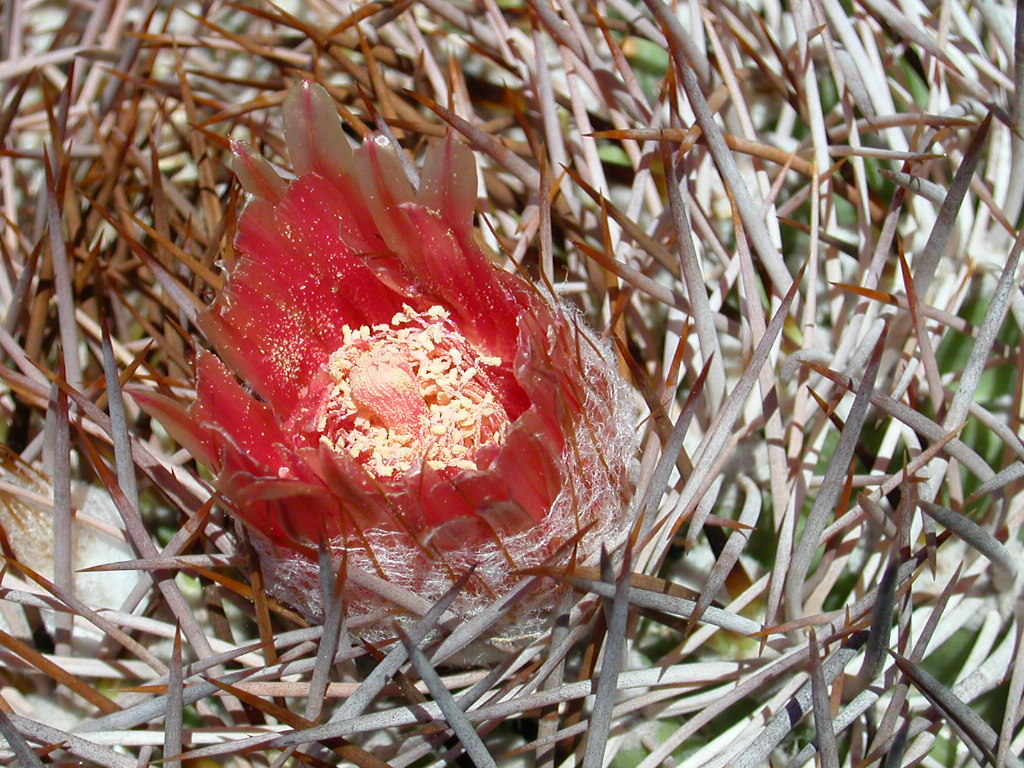
Flower

The flowers are numerous, with 50 to 75 per crown. They develop in older areoles and form a ring around the apex of the plant. They are funnel-shaped and yellow to reddish in color, with a length of 3 to 5 cm and a diameter of 2.2 cm. The pericarpel and floral tube appear completely covered in dense white wool and rigid bristles. The ovary is also covered in thick wool.

The fruits are elongated and dry. They measure approximately 4 cm in length and have many spines on their surfaces. They are covered in wool, floral remnants at the top end, and some scales. They split open when mature via a basal pore. The seeds are black, and measure 1.9 to 2.9 mm long and 1.3 to 2 mm wide. They have black pits and a subbasal hilum.

== Distribution and habitat ==
Eriosyce aurata is native to northern and north-central Chile, specifically to the regions of Atacama, Coquimbo, Valparaíso, and the Santiago Metropolitan Region. It is considered to be locally abundant and common, and may be encountered at many sites, including various protected areas such as Bosque de Fray Jorge National Park and Las Chinchillas National Reserve.

This species is found primarily in desert and dry shrubland biomes on rocky, north-facing slopes in the Andean precordillera at altitudes between 100 and 3000 meters above sea level. Its presence under these harsh conditions reflects its high adaptation to the aridity, intense sun exposure, and poor, rocky soils of its habitat.

== Taxonomy ==
Eriosyce auratus was first described as Echinocactus auratus, a name published in 1846 by the German botanist Ludwig Karl Georg Pfeiffer in his book Abbildungen und Beschreibung bluhender Cacteen 2: t. XIV.

Later, the German botanist Curt Backeberg transferred the species to the genus Eriosyce, renaming it Eriosyce aurata. He registered these changes in the scientific journal Cactus Journal (Croydon) 5: 9, published in 1936.

Etymology

- Eriosyce: the genus name is derived from the Greek words erion (meaning "wool") and sykē (meaning "fig"); this refers to the wooly fruits produces by the plants of this genus.
- aurata: the specific epithet is derived from the Latin word aurātus (meaning "covered in gold" or "golden"), in reference to the characteristic color of this species' spines.

=== Subspecies ===
As of November 2026, two subspecies are recognized by Plants of the World Online:

Image	Subspecies	Description	Distribution
	Eriosyce aurata var. aurata	4 to 6 central spines. Fruits covered in dense wool and large scales.	Northern and north-central Chile (Atacama to Santiago Metropolitan Region)
	Eriosyce aurata var. spinibarbis (F.Ritter) Katt., 1994	6 to 8 central spines. Fruits covered in less dense wool and small scales.	Northern Chile (Atacama)

Synonyms

- Synonyms of Eriosyce aurata var. aurata:
  - Echinocactus ceratistes Otto ex Pfeiff., 1837
  - Echinocactus sandillon Gay, 1848
  - Eriosyce algarrobensis F.Ritter, 1980
  - Eriosyce ceratistes (Otto ex Pfeiff.) Britton & Rose, 1922
  - Eriosyce ceratistes var. combarbalensis Backeb., 1956 publ. 1957
  - Eriosyce ceratistes var. coquimbensis Backeb., 1956 publ. 1957
  - Eriosyce ceratistes var. jorgensis Backeb., 1956 publ. 1957
  - Eriosyce ceratistes var. mollesensis Backeb., 1956 publ. 1957
  - Eriosyce ceratistes var. vallenarensis Backeb., 1956 publ. 1957
  - Eriosyce ceratistes var. zorillaensis Backeb., 1956 publ. 1957
  - Eriosyce ihotzkyanae F.Ritter, 1980
  - Eriosyce lapampaensis F.Ritter, 1980
  - Eriosyce sandillon Phil., 1872
  - Eriosyce sandillon var. algarrobensis (F.Ritter) A.E.Hoffm., 1989
  - Eriosyce sandillon var. mollesensis (Backeb.) A.E.Hoffm., 1989
  - Eriosyce sandillon var. vallenarensis (Backeb.) A.E.Hoffm., 1989
  - Trichocereus ceratistes (Otto ex Pfeiff.) H.P.Kelsey & Dayton, 1942
- Synonyms of Eriosyce aurata var. spinibarbis:
  - Eriosyce aurata subsp. spinibarbis (F.Ritter) M.H.J.van der Meer, 2022
  - Eriosyce spinibarbis F.Ritter, 1980

== Conservation status ==
On the IUCN Red List, Eriosyce aurata is classified as being of Least Concern (LC), which signifies that the species does not currently face a high risk of extinction on a global scale and that its populations are relatively stable in a significant part of its distribution.

The most significant threat to this species is poaching - significant extraction levels have been reported, and in many cases, acts of vandalism can also directly affect wild populations.

== Cultivation ==
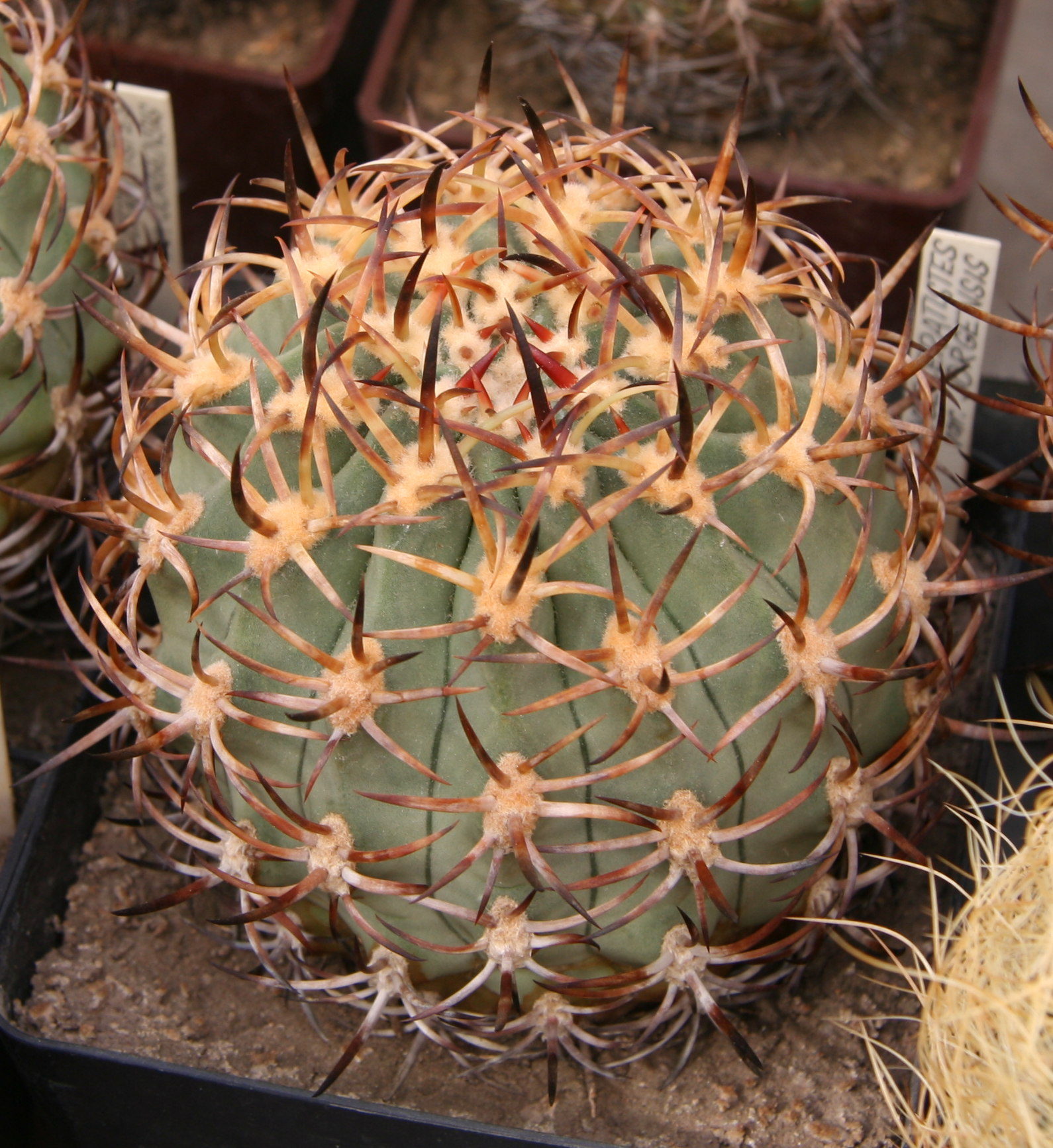
Plant in cultivation

Eriosyce aurata is mainly cultivated as an ornamental. It grows very slowly, and is extremely sensitive to excess humidity. It is especially prone to rot in poorly-ventilated spaces. It requires a well-draining mineral substrate, such as one made up of 70-80% gravel (or pumice, perlite, etc.) and 20-30% of cactus soil, which permits the soil to dry efficiently.

Irrigation should be scarce and moderate, especially during the summer, in order to keep the plant compact and to stop it from growing in an elongated or unnatural-looking way. During winter, or whenever temperatures drop below 10 ºC (50 ºF), the plant should be kept completely dry.

Eriosyce aurata must be exposed to intense full sun in order for its spines to fully develop, although it can tolerate some light shade. It is very heat-resistant and can also tolerate brief periods of temperatures down to -5 ºC (23 ºF), although it will not survive prolonged freezes. To keep the plant in optimum health, it should be kept in a well-ventilated space with temperatures preferably above 5 ºC (41 ºF).

This species is usually propagated via seed, since it rarely produces pups. The seedlings grow quickly, and are often grafted onto other cacti such as Pereskiopsis or dragonfruit due to the fact that cultivated specimens on their own roots (especially younger ones) are prone to root rot. Grafted plants are often longer-lived and more vigorous.

== Gallery ==
Plant in habitat, Valparaíso Region, Chile

Appearance of the plant

Detail of the golden-colored spines

Plant in flower

Woolly fruits
