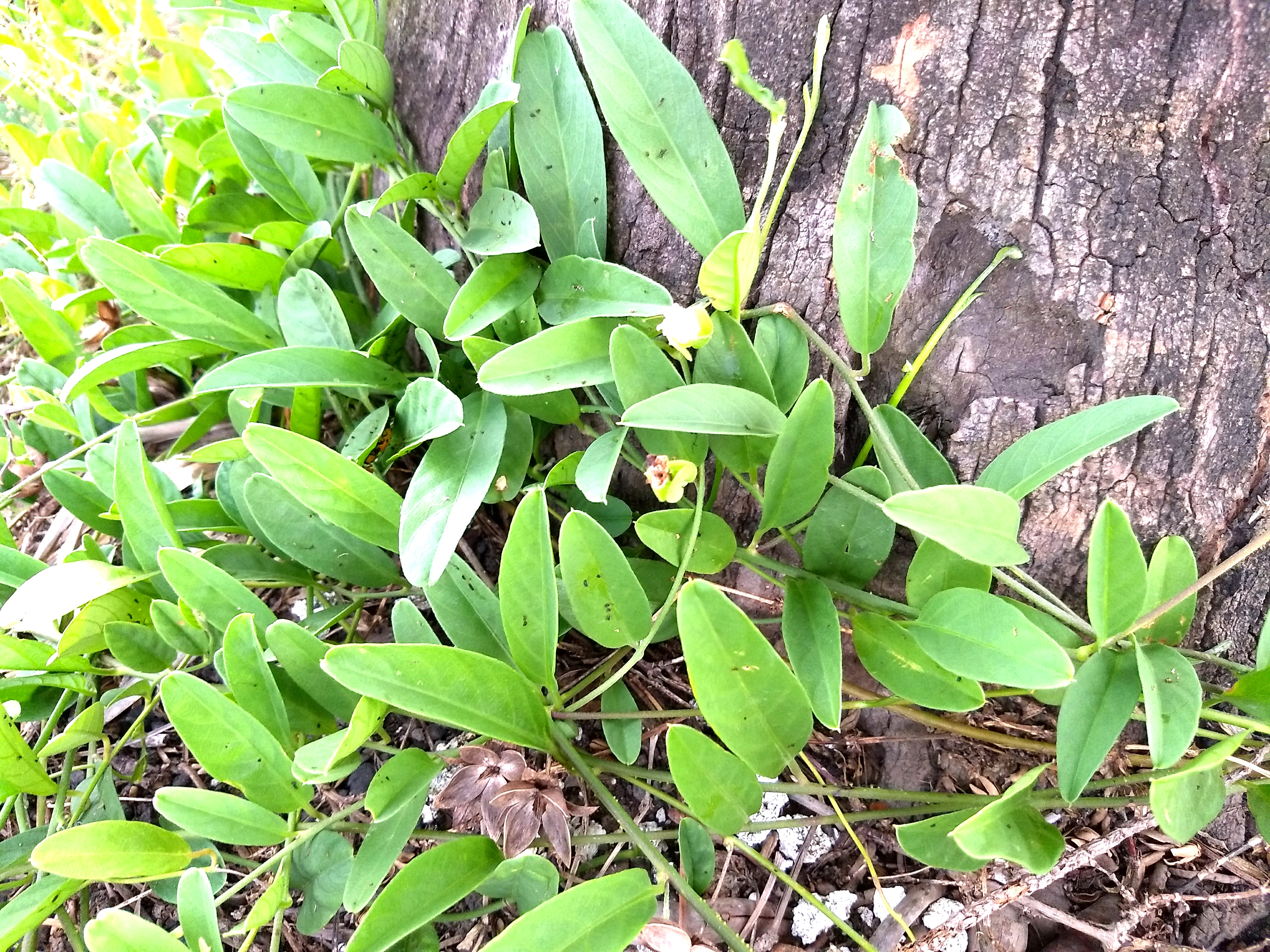
- Aniseia martinicensis

Scientific classification
- Kingdom: Plantae
- Clade: Tracheophytes
- Clade: Angiosperms
- Clade: Eudicots
- Clade: Asterids
- Order: Solanales
- Family: Convolvulaceae
- Genus: Aniseia; Choisy

= Aniseia =

Genus of flowering plants

Aniseia is a genus of flowering plants belonging to the family Convolvulaceae.

Its native range is Tropical and Subtropical America.

Species:

- Aniseia argentina (N.E.Br.) O'Donell
- Aniseia luxurians (Moric.) Athiê-Souza & Buril
- Aniseia martinicensis (Jacq.) Choisy
