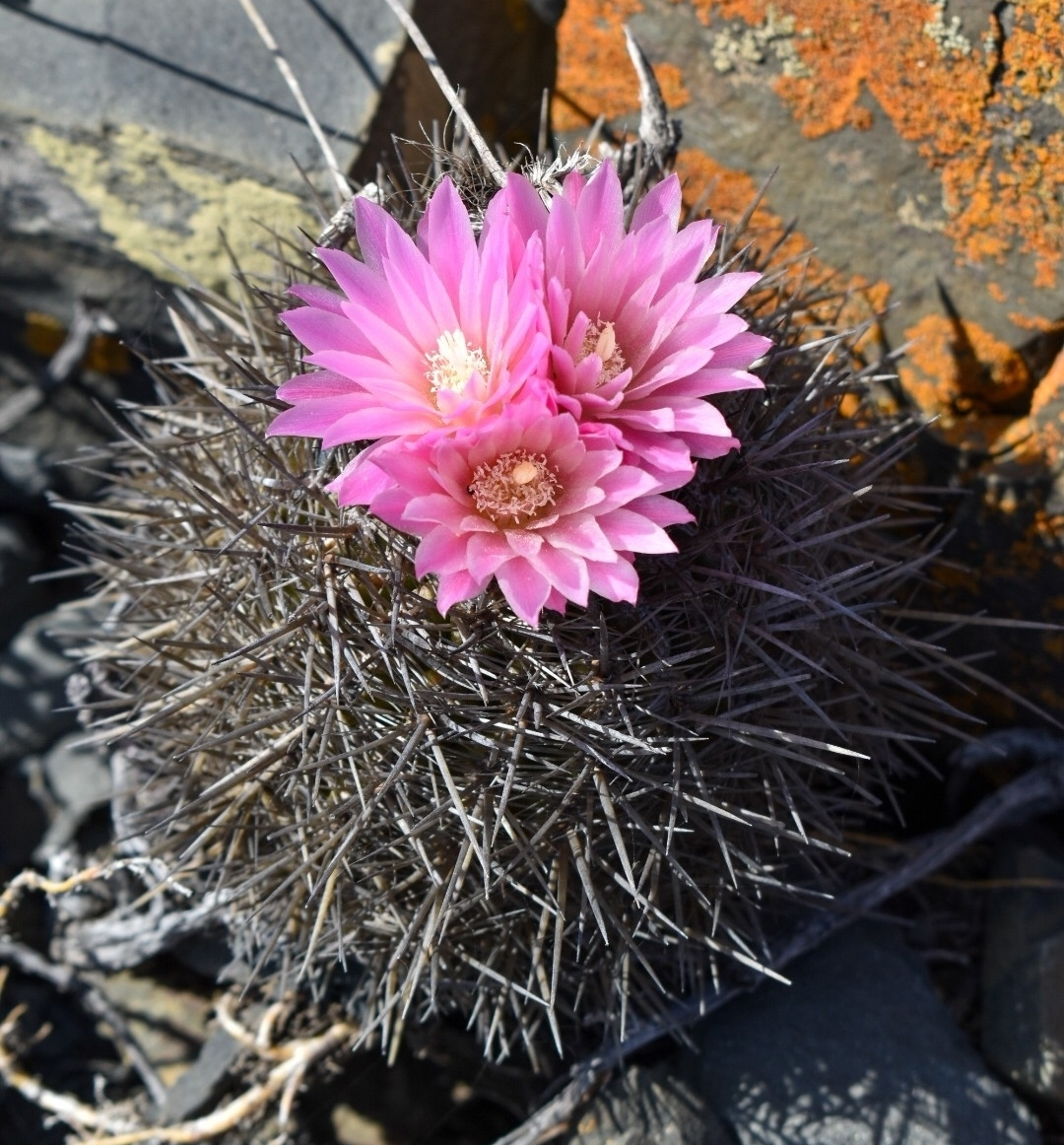
- Eriosyce chilensis var. albidiflora

Conservation status
- Critically Endangered (IUCN 3.1)

Scientific classification
- Kingdom: Plantae
- Clade: Embryophytes
- Clade: Tracheophytes
- Clade: Spermatophytes
- Clade: Angiosperms
- Clade: Eudicots
- Order: Caryophyllales
- Family: Cactaceae
- Subfamily: Cactoideae
- Genus: Eriosyce
- Species: E. chilensis

Binomial name
- Eriosyce chilensis (Hildm. ex K.Schum.) Katt.

= Eriosyce chilensis =

Species of cactus

Eriosyce chilensis or "Chilenito" is a critically endangered species of cactus from Chile. Found on the coast between Coquimbo and Valparaíso, the plant is one of the world's 100 most threatened species according to the IUCN. Its rarity is primarily due to its small native habitat range and illegal overcollection for the ornamental cactus trade. The cactus has two known varieties, which are similar except that var. chilensis produces red flowers while var. albidiflora produces yellow flowers.
