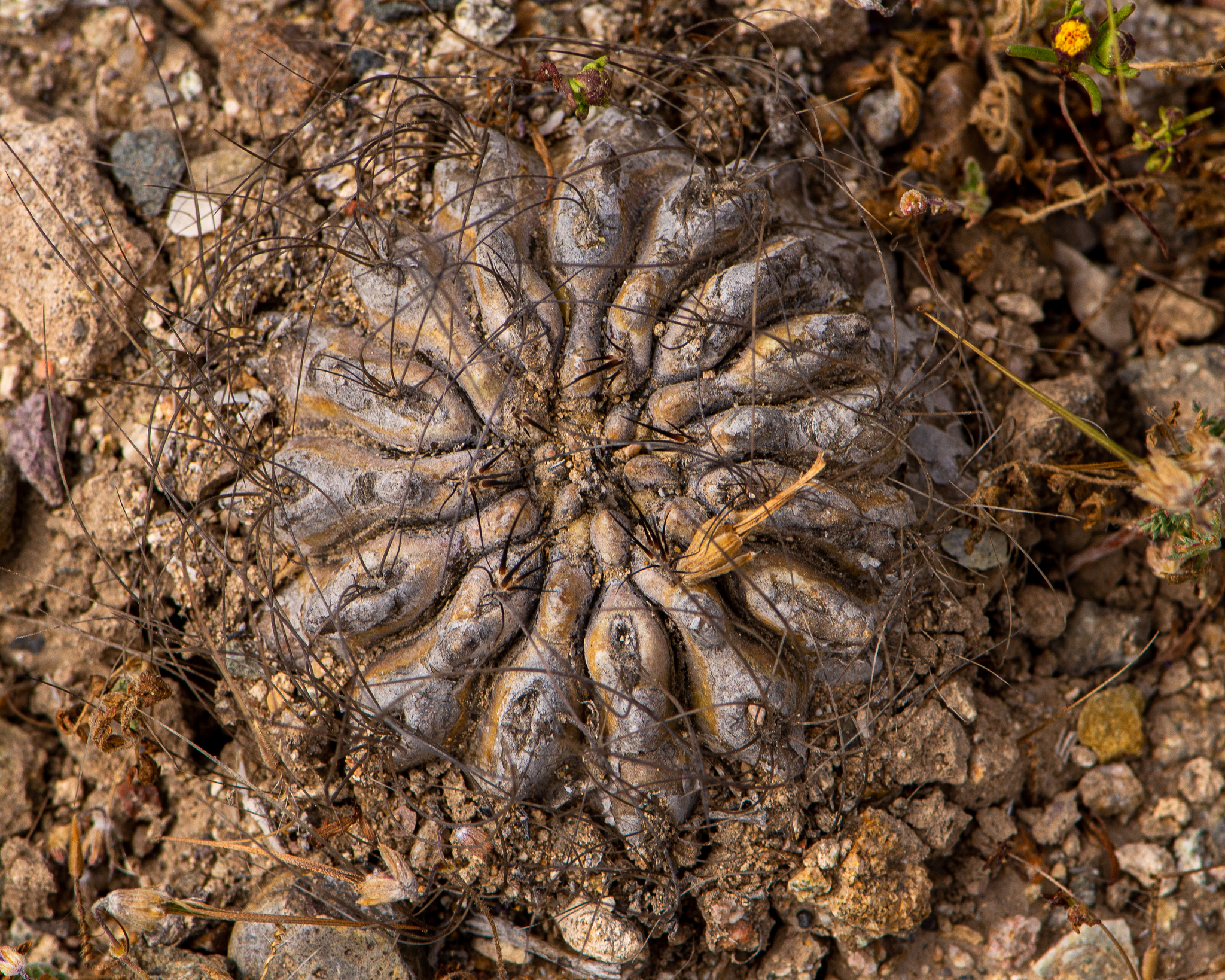

Conservation status
- Endangered (IUCN 3.1)

Scientific classification
- Kingdom: Plantae
- Clade: Tracheophytes
- Clade: Angiosperms
- Clade: Eudicots
- Order: Caryophyllales
- Family: Cactaceae
- Subfamily: Cactoideae
- Genus: Eriosyce
- Species: E. crispa

Binomial name
- Eriosyce crispa (F.Ritter) Katt.

= Eriosyce crispa =

Species of cactus

Eriosyce crispa is an endangered species of cactus native to the Accautama desert of Chile. This plant was first described in 1959 as Pyrrhocactus crispus in the Succulenta Journal by F. Rittler.

== Description ==
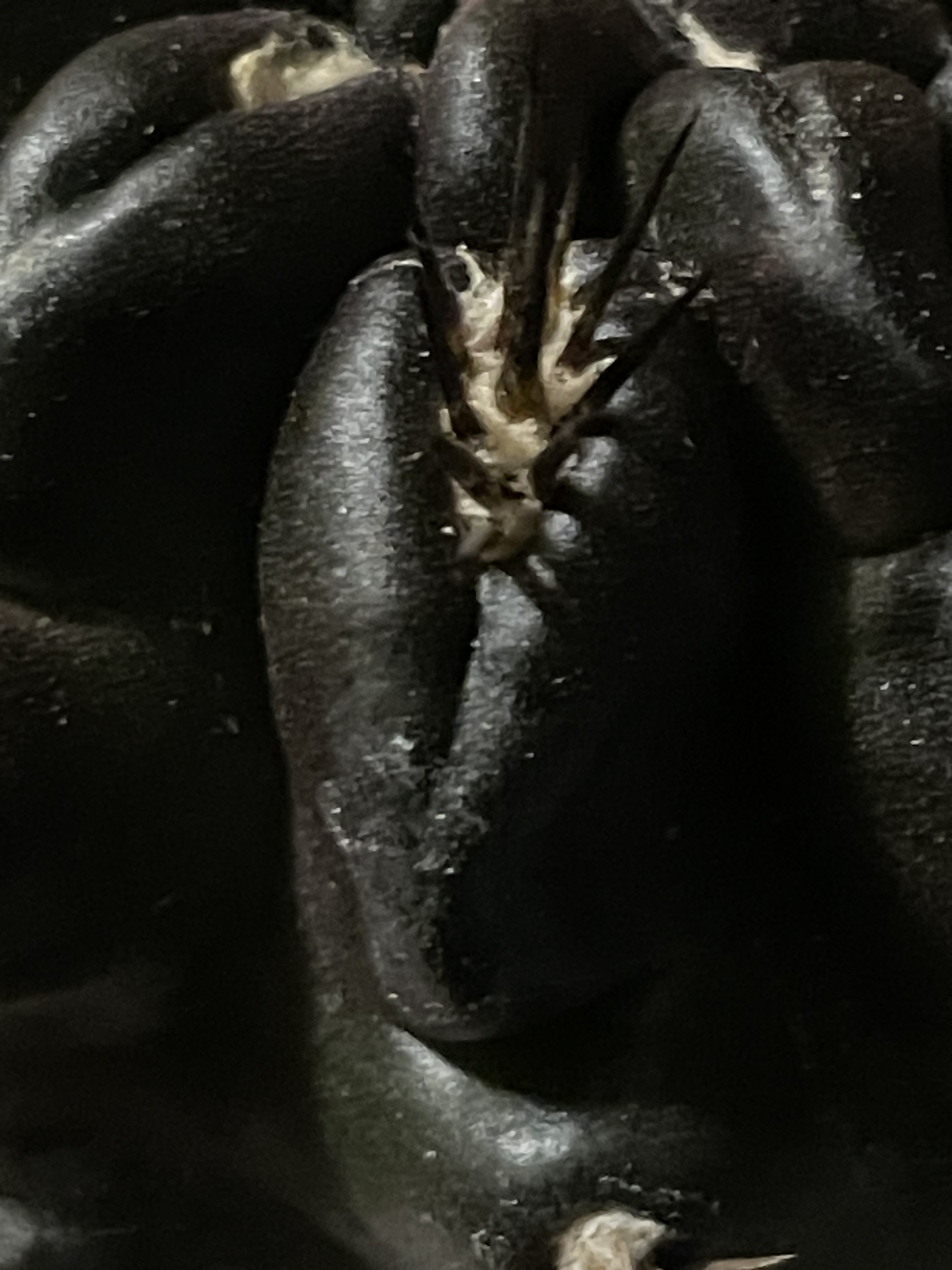
Eriosyce crispa var huascensis turbicule close up

This is a globular cactus that when sun stressed, turns to a dark purple, making it look as if the plant was black and when in shade, is green. This is used in horticulture to determine if enough light is being given to the plant. This plant's throns are long and black, and look like hair. The ribs are turbiculed.

== Flowers ==
Flowers are in clumps. White petals with a pink stripe, neon pink stigma and yellow antlers.

== Habitat ==
Costal areas of Chile in the accaumtama desert. This plant is usually flush with the ground and hard to spot in the wild unless it is in bloom.
