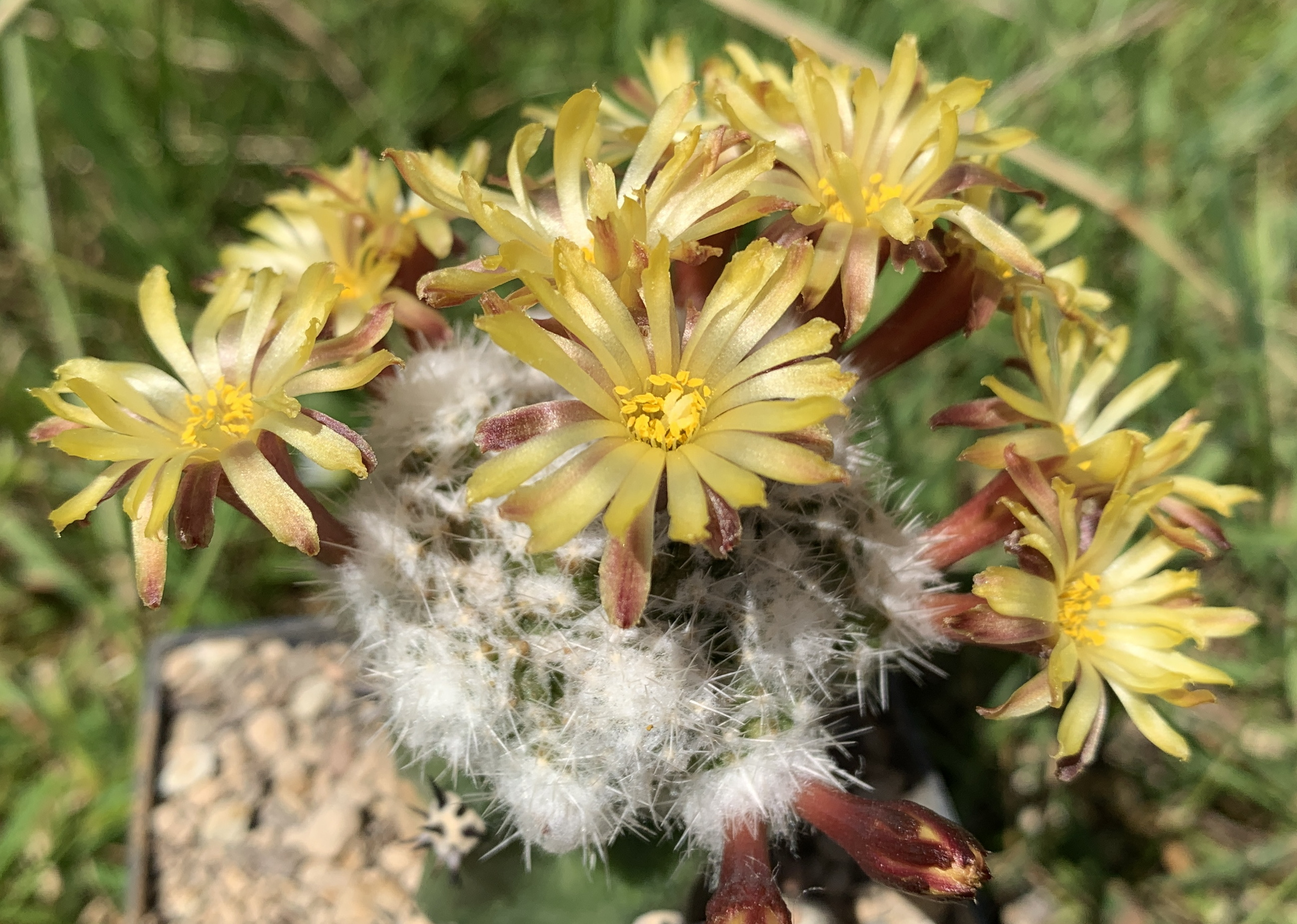

Conservation status
- Critically Endangered (IUCN 3.1)

Scientific classification
- Kingdom: Plantae
- Clade: Tracheophytes
- Clade: Angiosperms
- Clade: Eudicots
- Order: Caryophyllales
- Family: Cactaceae
- Subfamily: Cactoideae
- Genus: Rimacactus; Mottram
- Species: R. laui

Binomial name
- Rimacactus laui (Lüthy) Mottram

Synonyms
- Eriosyce laui Lüthy; Islaya laui (Lüthy) Faúndez & R.Kiesling

= Rimacactus =

Genus of cacti

Rimacactus is a genus of cacti with the sole species Rimacactus laui. It is native to Northern Chile, and at one point was considered a part of Eriosyce.

== Description ==
Rimacactus laui is a cactus species characterized by its spherical to elongated shoots, measuring up to 3 cm in diameter. These shoots exhibit a whitish-green to reddish coloration and possess a carrot-shaped taproot. The plant's barely visible ribs are segmented into warty tubercles, each bearing a small leaf remnant. The radial spines, numbering nine to thirteen, are thin, needle-like, spreading, and translucent white. They are up to 9 mm long and brittle, with no distinction between central and radial spines. The flowers are narrowly funnel-shaped, approximately 2 cm long and 1.5 cm in diameter, and sulfur-yellow with a whitish-yellow base. They often appear in clusters of up to six. The pericarpel of the flower is smooth or nearly smooth. The fruits are red, elongated, balloon-shaped, and smooth, reaching up to 3.5 cm in length. They open via a basal pore.

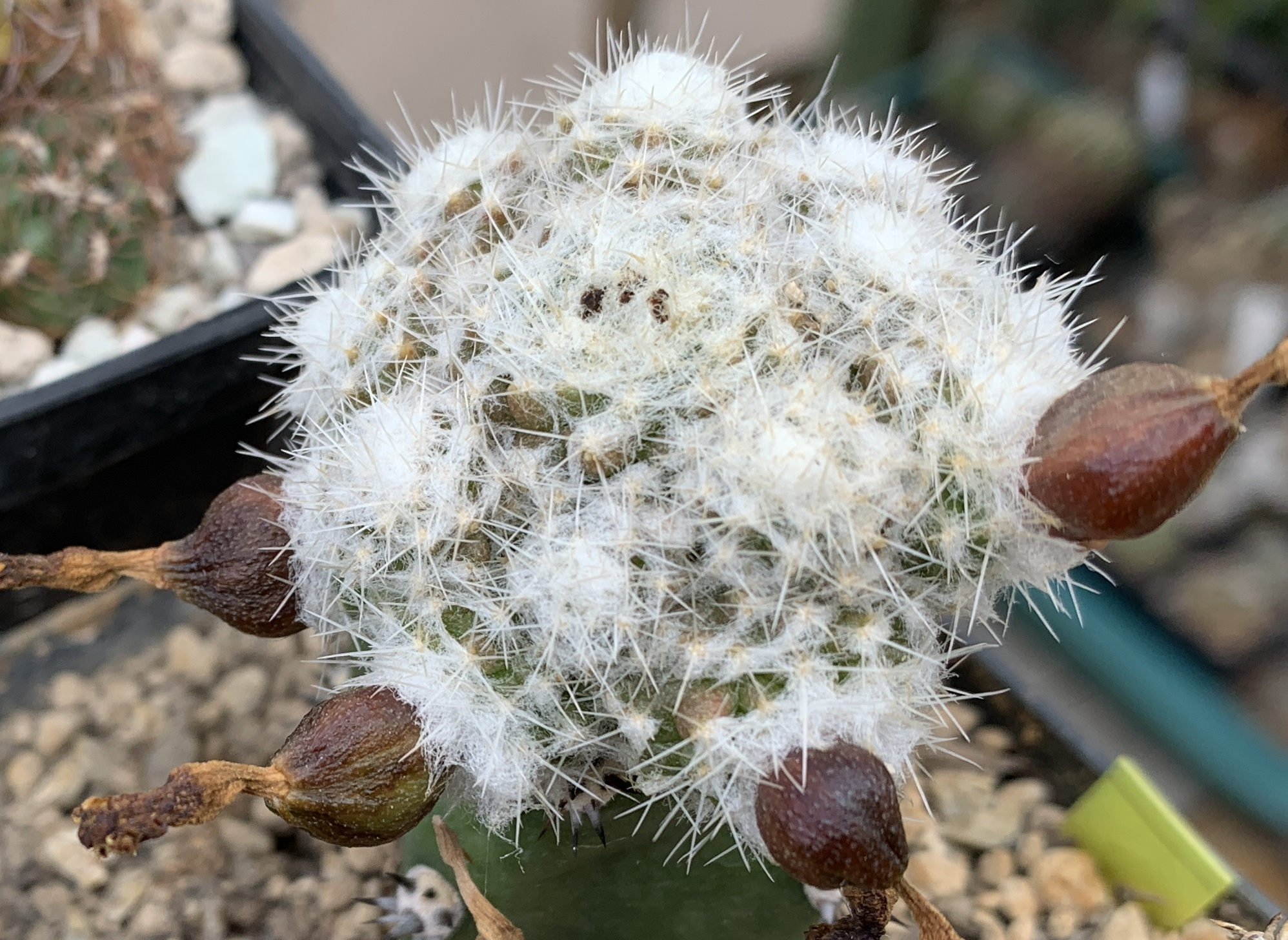
Fruits

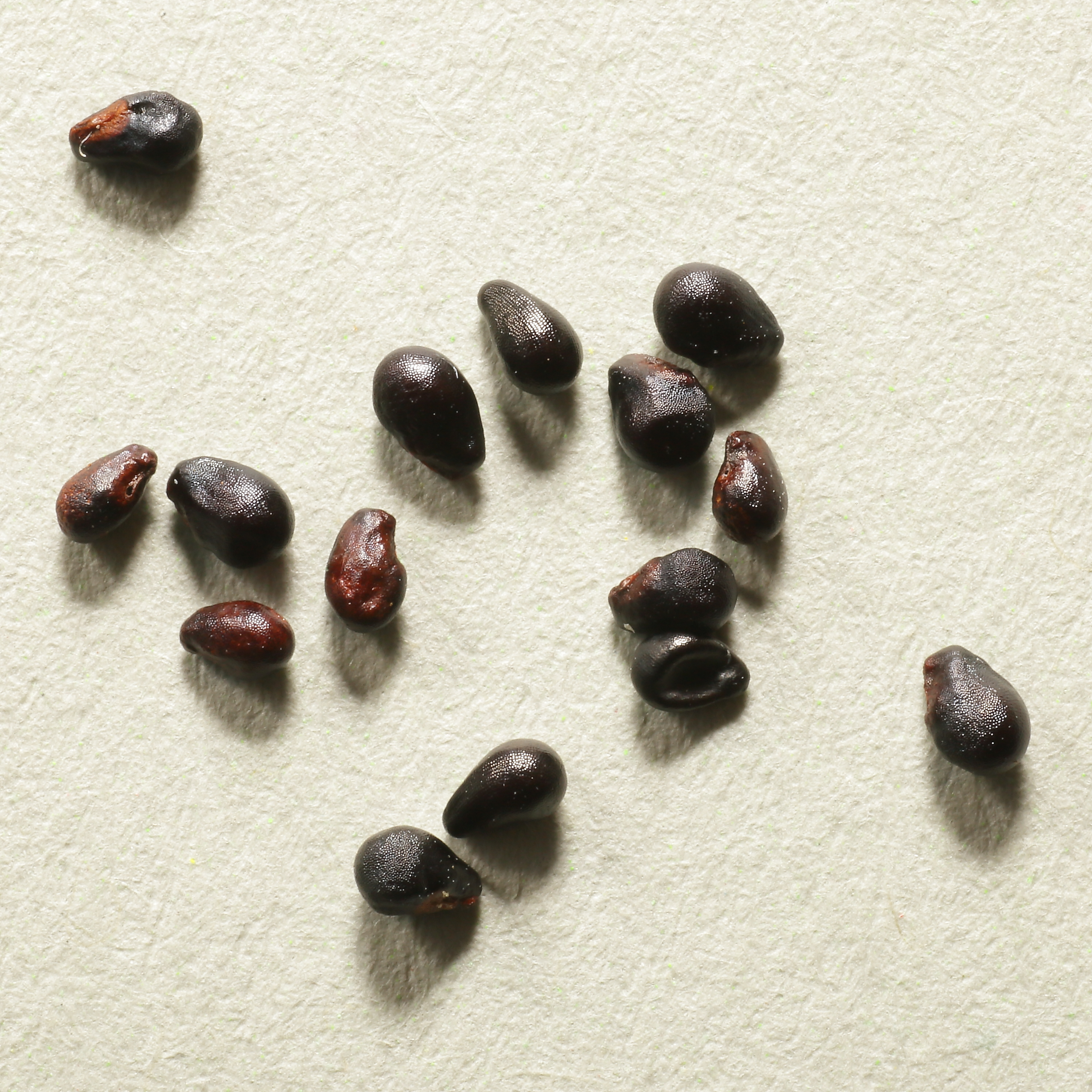
seeds

== Distribution ==
Rimacactus laui is native to the north of the Chilean Antofagasta region, specifically near Tocopilla, where it grows on dry slopes of the coastal mountain range with fog at elevations around 400 meters. Plants are found growing along Eriosyce iquiquensis and Eulychnia iquiquensis.

== Taxonomy ==
The species was initially described as Eriosyce laui by Jonas Martin Lüthy in 1994. In 2001, Roy Mottram reclassified it into the genus Rimacactus. The species epithet honors German cactus researcher Alfred Bernhard Lau.
