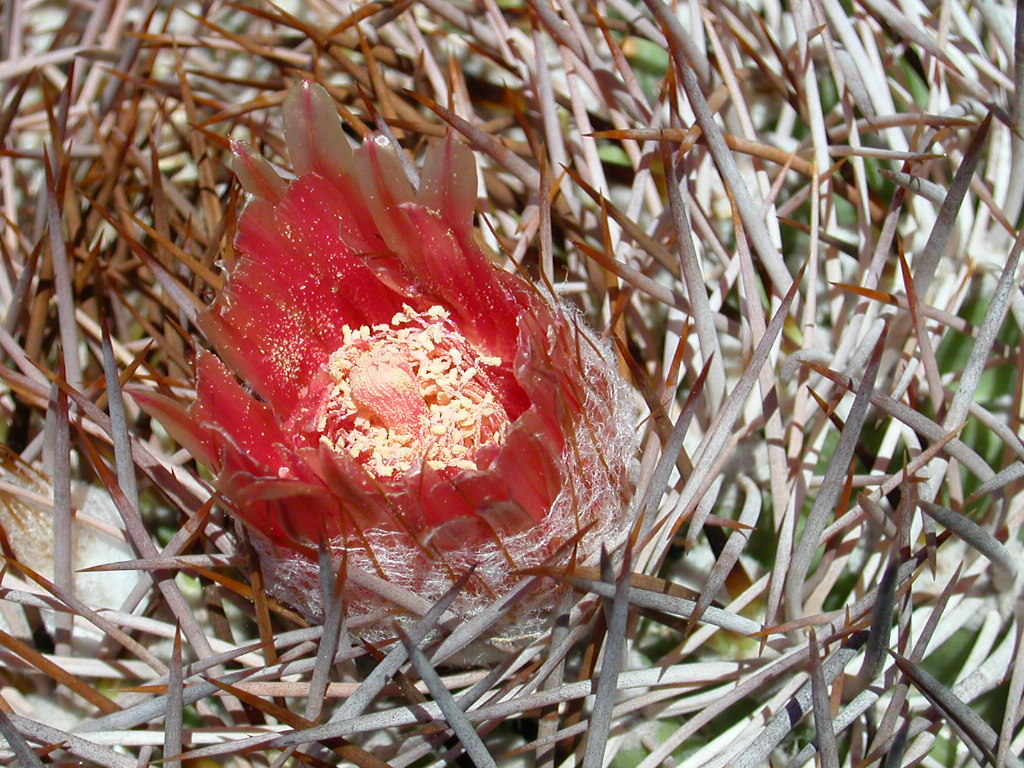
- Eriosyce aurata

Scientific classification
- Kingdom: Plantae
- Clade: Tracheophytes
- Clade: Angiosperms
- Clade: Eudicots
- Order: Caryophyllales
- Family: Cactaceae
- Subfamily: Cactoideae
- Tribe: Notocacteae
- Genus: Eriosyce; Phil.

Type species
- Eriosyce aurata

Species
- See text

= Eriosyce =

Genus of cacti

Eriosyce is a genus of cacti native to Chile, Argentina and Peru.

== Description ==
They are spherical to cylindrical plants that rarely sprout. The plants reach heights of growth of up to 1 m and have a diameter of up to 50 cm. They form 7 to 30 ribs on which the thorn-bearing areoles sit. The ribs are deepened between the areoles. The flowers usually appear near the apex, are funnel-shaped and yellow to red in color. The fruits are hollow, often woolly berries, in which the seed is usually loose. The berries often tear open at the base. The seeds are 0.7 to 3 mm long.

== Species ==
As of September 2026, Plants of the World Online accepts the following species:

Image	Scientific name	Distribution
	Eriosyce aconcaguensis (F.Ritter) P.C.Guerrero & Helmut Walter	Chile (Valparaíso)
	Eriosyce andicola (F.Ritter) P.C.Guerrero & Helmut Walter	Chile (Valparaíso)
	Eriosyce andreaeana Katt.	Argentina (La Rioja)
	Eriosyce armata (F.Ritter) P.C.Guerrero & Helmut Walter	Chile
	Eriosyce aspillagae (Söhrens) Katt.	Chile
	Eriosyce atroviridis (F.Ritter) P.C.Guerrero & Helmut Walter	Chile (S. Atacama)
	Eriosyce aurata (Pfeiff.) Backeb.	Chile (Atacama to Santiago).
	Eriosyce bulbocalyx (Werderm.) Katt.	Argentina (San Juan, La Rioja, San Luis)
	Eriosyce calderana (F.Ritter) Ferryman	Chile (Atacama)
	Eriosyce caliginiphila R.Pinto	Chile (Tarapacá)
	Eriosyce camanaensis (F.Cáceres) M.H.J.van der Meer	Peru (Arequipa)
	Eriosyce castanea (F.Ritter) P.C.Guerrero & Helmut Walter	Chile
	Eriosyce chilensis (Hildm. ex K.Schum.) Katt.	Chile
	Eriosyce choapensis (F.Ritter) P.C.Guerrero & Helmut Walter	Chile (Coquimbo)
	Eriosyce clavata (Söhrens ex K.Schum.) Helmut Walter	Chile (Central to SW. Atacama)
	Eriosyce coimasensis (F.Ritter) P.C.Guerrero & Helmut Walter	Chile
	Eriosyce crispa (F.Ritter) Katt.	Chile (Atacama)
	Eriosyce curvispina (Bertero ex Colla) Katt.	Chile.
	Eriosyce duripulpa (F.Ritter) P.C.Guerrero & Helmut Walter	Chile (SW. Atacama)
	Eriosyce elquiensis (Katt.) P.C.Guerrero & Helmut Walter	Chile (Coquimbo)
	Eriosyce engleri (F.Ritter) Katt.	Chile.
	Eriosyce eriosyzoides (F.Ritter) Ferryman	Chile (Atacama, Coquimbo).
	Eriosyce esmeraldana (F.Ritter) Katt.	Chile (Antofogasta).
	Eriosyce fankhauseri (F.Ritter) P.C.Guerrero & Helmut Walter	Chile (Atacama).
	Eriosyce fulva (F.Ritter) P.C.Guerrero & Helmut Walter	Chile (Atacama).
	Eriosyce garaventae (F.Ritter) Katt.	Chile (Valparaíso).
	Eriosyce glabrescens (F.Ritter) P.C.Guerrero & Helmut Walter	Chile (Atacama).
	Eriosyce grandiflora (F.Ritter) P.C.Guerrero & Helmut Walter	Chile (E Santiago)
	Eriosyce heinrichiana (Backeb.) Katt.	Chile (Atacama, Coquimbo).
	Eriosyce horrida (Gay) P.C.Guerrero & Helmut Walter	Chile (Valparaíso)
	Eriosyce iquiquensis (F.Ritter) Ferryman	Chile (Tarapacá, Antofagasta)
	Eriosyce islayensis (C.F.Först.) Katt.	Peru to Chile
	Eriosyce jussieui (Monv. ex Salm-Dyck) P.C.Guerrero & Helmut Walter	Chile (Coquimbo)
	Eriosyce krausii (F.Ritter) Katt.	Chile (SW. Antofagasta to Atacama)
	Eriosyce kunzei (C.F.Först.) Katt.	Chile (Atacama, Coquimbo).
	Eriosyce lichyi (Matusz. & Kupčák) M.H.J.van der Meer	Argentina (Catamarca)
	Eriosyce limariensis (F.Ritter) Katt.	Chile (N. Coquimbo).
	Eriosyce litoralis (F.Ritter) P.C.Guerrero & Helmut Walter	Chile.
	Eriosyce malleolata (F.Ritter) P.C.Guerrero & Helmut Walter	Chile.
	Eriosyce marksiana (F.Ritter) Katt.	Chile.
	Eriosyce megliolii (Rausch) Ferryman	Argentina (San Juan)
	Eriosyce mutabilis (F.Ritter) P.C.Guerrero & Helmut Walter	Chile (Coquimbo)
	Eriosyce napina (Phil.) Katt.	Chile (SW. Atacama)
	Eriosyce nigrihorrida (Backeb.) P.C.Guerrero & Helmut Walter	Chile.
	Eriosyce occulta Katt.	Chile (SW. Antofagasta).
	Eriosyce odieri (Lem. ex Salm-Dyck.) Katt.	Chile (Atacama)
	Eriosyce orientalis (F.Ritter) P.C.Guerrero & Helmut Walter	Chile (NE Valparaíso)
	Eriosyce paucicostata (F.Ritter) Ferryman	Chile (SW. Antofagasta).
	Eriosyce recondita (F.Ritter) Katt.	Chile (Antofagasta)
	Eriosyce riparia (Mächler & Helmut Walter) P.C.Guerrero & Helmut Walter	Chile (Coquimbo).
	Eriosyce robusta (F.Ritter) P.C.Guerrero & Helmut Walter	Chile (NE Valparaíso)
	Eriosyce rodentiophila F.Ritter	Chile (Antofagasta).
	Eriosyce senilis (Backeb.) Katt.	Chile
	Eriosyce simulans (F.Ritter) Katt.	Chile (Coquimbo)
	Eriosyce sociabilis (F.Ritter) Katt.	Chile (Atacama)
	Eriosyce spectabilis Katt., Helmut Walter & J.C.Acosta	Chile (Atacama).
	Eriosyce strausiana (K.Schum.) Katt.	Argentina (La Rioja to Rio Negro)
	Eriosyce subgibbosa (Haw.) Katt.	Chile
	Eriosyce taltalensis (Hutchison) Katt.	Chile (SW. Antofagasta to NW. Atacama)
	Eriosyce tenebrica (F.Ritter) Katt.	Chile (Atacama, Coquimbo).
	Eriosyce tuberculosa S.Campb.	Chile (Atacama)
	Eriosyce umadeave (Fric ex Kreuz.) Katt.	Argentina (Jujuy, Salta)
	Eriosyce vallenarensis (F.Ritter) Katt.	Chile (S. Atacama).
	Eriosyce villicumensis (Rausch) Katt.	Argentina (San Juan).
	Eriosyce villosa (Monv.) Katt.	Chile (Atacama, Coquimbo).
	Eriosyce wagenknechtii (F.Ritter) Katt.	Chile (N. Coquimbo).

== Synonymy ==
The following genera have been brought into synonymy with Eriosyce:

- Chilenia Backeb.
- Chileniopsis Backeb.
- Chileocactus Frič
- Chileorebutia F.Ritter
- Chiliorebutia Frič (orth. var.)
- Delaetia Backeb.
- Dracocactus Y.Itô
- Euporteria Kreuz. & Buining
- Friesia Frič ex Kreuz.
- Hildmannia Kreuz. & Buining
- Horridocactus Backeb.
- Islaya Backeb.
- Neochilenia Backeb.
- Neoporteria Britton & Rose
- Neotanahashia Y.Itô
- Netanahashia Y.Itô
- Nichelia Bullock
- Pyrrhocactus A.Berger
- Rodentiophila F.Ritter & Y.Itô
- Thelocephala Y.Itô

Rimacactus laui was formerly included within Eriosyce as Eriosyce laui.
