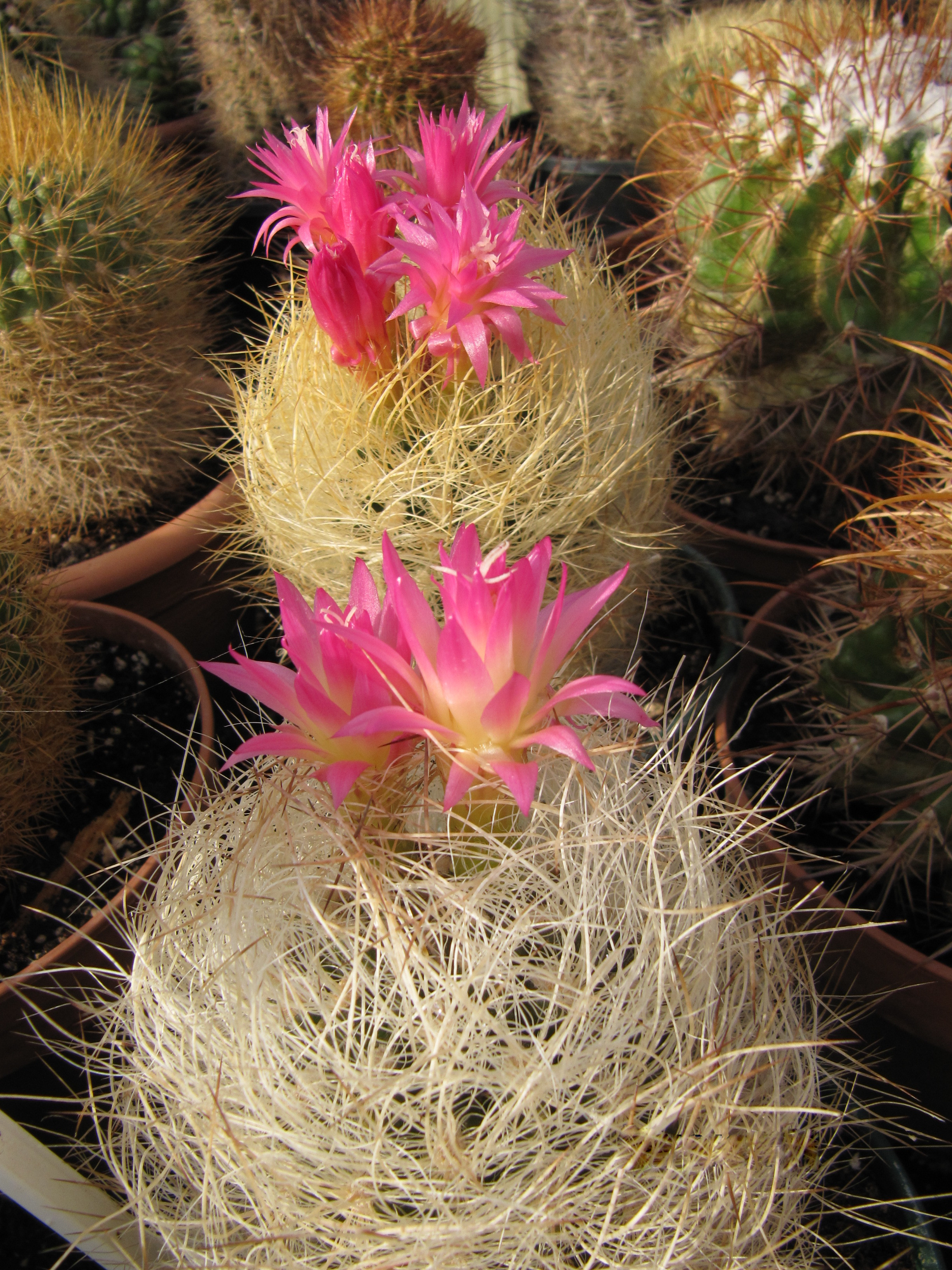

Scientific classification
- Kingdom: Plantae
- Clade: Embryophytes
- Clade: Tracheophytes
- Clade: Spermatophytes
- Clade: Angiosperms
- Clade: Eudicots
- Order: Caryophyllales
- Family: Cactaceae
- Subfamily: Cactoideae
- Genus: Eriosyce
- Species: E. senilis

Binomial name
- Eriosyce senilis (Backeb.) Katt.

Synonyms
- List: Echinocactus senilis Phil.; Neoporteria gerocephala Y.Itô; Neoporteria multicolor F.Ritter; Neoporteria nidus var. gerocephala (Y.Itô) F.Ritter; Neoporteria nidus var. matancillana F.Ritter; Neoporteria nidus var. multicolor (F.Ritter) A.E.Hoffm.; Neoporteria nidus f. senilis (Backeb.) Donald & G.D.Rowley; Neoporteria senilis Backeb.; Neoporteria thiebautiana (Backeb.) Y.Itô

= Eriosyce senilis =

Species of cactus

Eriosyce senilis, called old-man cactus along with a number of similar species, is a species of cactus in the genus Eriosyce, native to Chile. It has gained the Royal Horticultural Society's Award of Garden Merit.
