= Carlo Giuseppe Bertero =

Sardinian botanist and physicist (1789–1831)

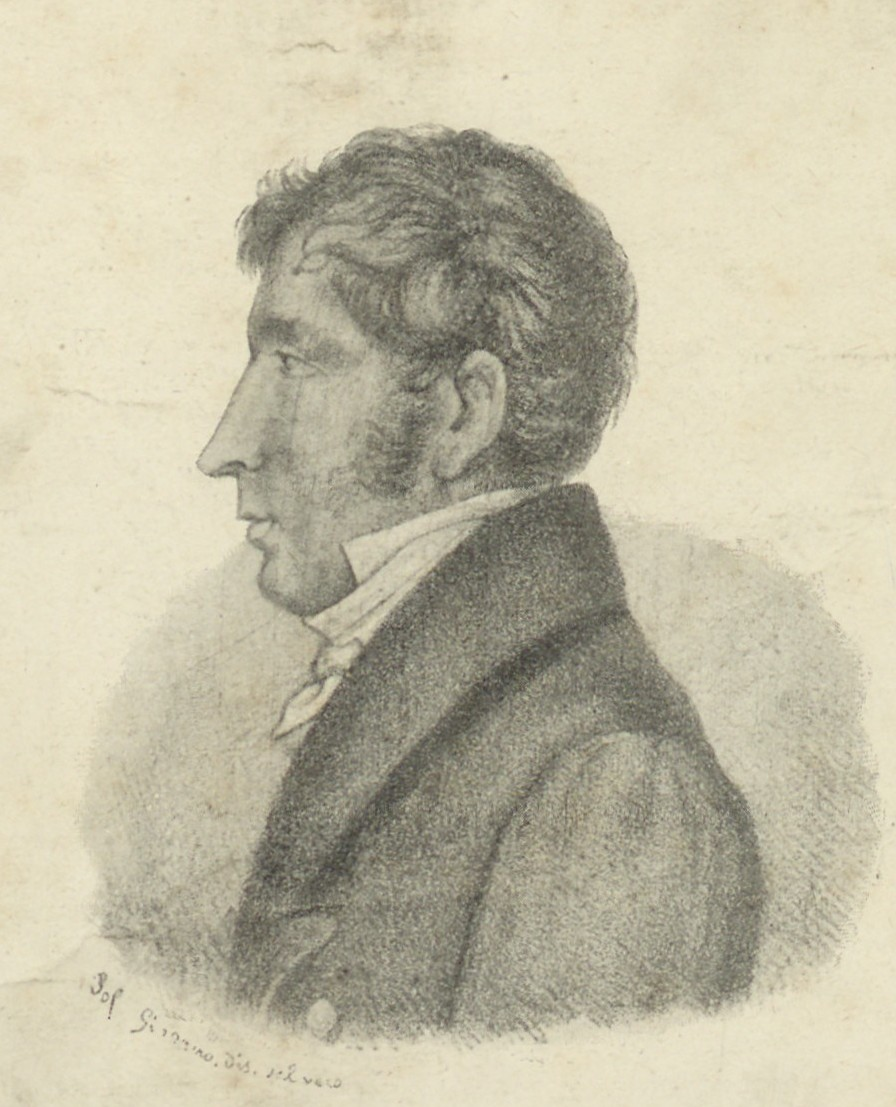
- Portrait of Carlo Giuseppe Bertero by Sofia Giordano, 1827
- Born: Luigi Carlo Giuseppe Bertero; October 14, 1789; Santa Vittoria d'Alba, Italy
- Died: April 1831 (aged 41); South Pacific Ocean
- Occupation: Botanist
- Known for: Disappearance at sea
- Scientific career
- Author abbrev. (botany): Bertero

Luigi Carlo Giuseppe Bertero (b. Santa Vittoria d'Alba, October 14, 1789 d. April 1831, – South Pacific Ocean) was an Italian physicist, medical dictor, naturalist, botanist, bryologist and pteridologist. He explored the West Indies between 1816 and 1821 coinciding with the Venezuelan scientist and later president, José María Vargas in Puerto Rico although there is no evidence of any exchange between them. During his two voyages, February 1828 to September 1830 and between March and May 1830, he collected and described the flora of Chile. He also examined plants native to the Pacific island of Juan Fernandez, as well as Guadeloupe, Haiti, Puerto Rico, and Colombia. He is presumed lost in a shipwreck while sailing from Tahiti to Chile. Bertero´s herbarium specimens were bought after his death by the joint stock company Unio Itineraria and distributed among its members in the exsiccata-like series Unio itineraria 1835.

== Eponyms ==
In 1834 Luigi Aloysius Colla named a species of cactus, Cactus berteroi, after Bertero. The species is now a synonym of Eriosyce subgibbosa.

The genus Berteroa is named after Carlo Bertero.

- (Brassicaceae) Berteroa DC.
- (Cactaceae) Opuntia berteroi (Colla) A.E. Hoffm.
- (Cactaceae) Opuntia berteri (C.F. Först.) E. F. Anderson

The following lichens are named in honor of Bertero:

- Biatora berteroana Mont. (1852)
- Brigantiaea berteroana (Mont.) Trevis. (1853)
- Pseudocyphellaria berteroana (Mont.) Redon (1977)
- Sticta berteroana Mont. (1835)
- Lecidea berteroana (Mont.) Nyl. (1855)

Several Neotropical plants have the specific epithet berteroi in honor of Bertero.

== Abbreviation (botany) ==
The standard author abbreviation Bertero is used to indicate this person as the author when citing a botanical name.

== See also ==
- List of people who disappeared mysteriously at sea

== Bibliography ==
VIGNOLO-LUTATI, F.: L'opera botanica del dott. Carlo Bertero di S. Vittoria d'Alba (1789–1831) nelle antille e Sud-America (1816–21 e 1827–31) quale risulta dalle collezioni dell'ist. ed orto botanico d. Univ. di Torino.. Turín: Librería Le Colonne, 1955.
MATTIROLO, O.: Nel I centenario della trágica scomparsa del celebre botanico esploratore medico carlo bertero di santa vittoria d'alba. Estudio Bibliográfico: Bosio Giovanni - Magliano Alpi, 1932.
