= Eriosyce subgibbosa =

Conservation status
- Least Concern (IUCN 3.1)

Scientific classification
- Kingdom: Plantae
- Clade: Tracheophytes
- Clade: Angiosperms
- Clade: Eudicots
- Order: Caryophyllales
- Family: Cactaceae
- Subfamily: Cactoideae
- Genus: Eriosyce
- Species: E. subgibbosa

Binomial name
- Eriosyce subgibbosa (Haw.) Katt.

Synonyms
- This species has 62 synonyms: (see text)

Species of cactus

Eriosyce subgibbosa, commonly known in Spanish as cacto rosado, quisquito, or quisquito rosado, is a species of succulent flowering plant in the genus Eriosyce, within the family Cactaceae. It is endemic to central Chile, and it is one of the few species in its genus that form cylindrical stems.

== Description ==
Plant with a leaning stem

Plant with flowers and flower buds

Eriosyce subgibbosa is a species of cactus that generally has a solitary habitat, although it may occasionally exhibit branching. The stem may be globose to elongated in shape, and on exceptional specimens, it may grow to 1 m in length, with a diameter of 6-25 cm. With age and growth, the stem tends to lean. The epidermis varies in color from yellowish to grass-green to very dark green with some glaucousness. The root system is made up of fibrous roots or a short main root. The stem has 16-22 ribs with a height of 0.5-2 cm, which are deeply notched and depressed between the areoles and distinctly tuberculate. The areoles are large and woolly. The spines are numerous, rigid, and acicular, and are yellow to brown or black in color. Often, it is difficult to clearly distinguish central spines from radial spines. Most of the spines are straight, although some may be strongly curved. There are 8-30 radial spines, which are thin and needle-shaped. These measure 1-2 cm in length. There are also 1-16 central spines, which are thicker; these may reach 4 cm in length. The flowers develop from younger areoles; occasionally, more than one flower will develop per areole. The buds are red in color, and when they open, the flowers are varying intensities of carmine-red in color. They also vary in size, depending on the specific population. The pericarpel and floral tube exhibit tufts of wool, which may be long or short, in the axils of the bract scales. Bristles may also be present; these are located on the upper part of the tube (sometimes extending to the pericarpel) and are glassy white in color.

The floral tube is narrowly funnel-shaped to almost tubular. The internal tepals are narrowly lanceolate, carmine-red in color, and are curved inwards. The style measures 1.5-3 cm in length and approximately 1.3 mm in width; it is cream-colored, although it may sometimes be tinged with purplish-red. The apex of the locule of the ovary appears raised. The stigma has 5-12 lobes, which measure 2-6 mm in length, are cream, orange, or fuchsia in color, erect, and occasionally extended. The nectary is modified, enlarged, and somewhat rounded at the base. It is 5-8 mm in length.

The fruit is elongated, bright red in color, and opens through a basal pore, staying attached to the plant. The area into which the floral remnants are inserted is small, occupying approximately 27% of the fruit's diameter.

The seeds measure approximately 1.09 mm in length and have an asymmetry ratio of 0.5. The testa is brown, finely tuberculate, and slightly ribbed. The hilum is keyhole-shaped; it is flat, and measures approximately 0.44 mm in length and 0.21 mm in width. The micropyle is situated in the narrow part of the hilum and an enlarged, non-raised margin.

== Distribution and habitat ==
Eriosyce subgibbosa is native to central Chile, specifically to the regions of Biobío, Maule, O’Higgins, Valparaíso, Coquimbo, and Atacama. It is endemic to coastal areas, and is found from the Hualpén Peninsula in the Biobío region north to the Huasco river valley in the southern Atacama region.

This species mainly inhabits the subtropical biome, at altitudes of 0 to 200 meters above sea level. It grows on rocky outcrops on coastal terraces, cliffs, and slopes, where it often hangs from the rocks. It is frequently found in environments associated with sclerophyllous forest, in Mediterranean climates ranging from arid in the north near the Atacama Desert to much more humid in the south near the Valdivian temperate forests.

== Taxonomy ==
Eriosyce subgibbosa was first described as Echinocactus subgibbosus, a name published in 1831 by the British botanist Adrian Hardy Haworth in the scientific journal Philosophical Magazine, or Annals of Chemistry, n.s., 10: 419.

Later, the German botanist Fred Kattermann transferred this species to the genus Eriosyce, renaming it Eriosyce subgibbosa. He registered these changes in his book Eriosyce (Cactaceae): The genus revised and amplified: 119, published in 1994.

Etymology

- Eriosyce: The genus name is derived from the Greek words erion (meaning "wool") and sykē (meaning "fig"); this refers to the wooly fruits produces by the plants of this genus.
- subgibbosa: The specific epithet is derived from the Latin terms sub- (meaning "almost" or "more or less") and gibbosus (meaning "gibbous" or "asymetrically swollen); this refers to this species' stems, which are somewhat tuberculate.

Synonyms

- Cactus floribundus Kuntze, 1891
- Cactus gibbosus (Salm-Dyck) Kuntze, 1891, nombre ilegítimo
- Cereus foveolatus Haage ex Pfeiff., 1837
- Cereus hoffmannseggii C.F.Först., 1846
- Cereus montevidensis Pfeiff., 1837
- Chilenia acutissima (Otto & A.Dietr.) Backeb. ex A.W.Hill, 1938
- Chilenia castaneoides (Cels ex Salm-Dyck) Backeb. ex A.W.Hill, 1938
- Chilenia heteracantha Backeb., 1938
- Chilenia rostrata (Jacobi) Backeb., 1939
- Chilenia subcylindrica Backeb., 1938
- Chilenia subgibbosa (Haw.) Backeb., 1936
- Echinocactus acutissimus Otto & A.Dietr., 1835
- Echinocactus acutissimus var. cristatus C.F.Först., 1885
- Echinocactus castaneoides Cels ex Salm-Dyck, 1850
- Echinocactus crenatus Pfeiff., 1837
- Echinocactus exsculptus Otto ex Pfeiff., 1837
- Echinocactus exsculptus var. cristatus C.F.Först., 1885
- Echinocactus exsculptus var. elatior C.F.Först., 1846
- Echinocactus exsculptus var. foveolatus (Haage ex Pfeiff.) Salm-Dyck, 1845
- Echinocactus exsculptus var. fulvispinus C.F.Först., 1846
- Echinocactus exsculptus var. tenuispinus C.F.Först., 1846
- Echinocactus exsculptus var. thrincogonus C.F.Först., 1846
- Echinocactus foveolatus (Haage ex Pfeiff.) Salm-Dyck, 1850
- Echinocactus gayanus Lem., 1839
- Echinocactus guyannensis Pfeiff., 1837
- Echinocactus montevidensis C.F.Först., 1846
- Echinocactus rostratus Jacobi, 1856
- Euporteria subgibbosa (Haw.) Kreuz. & Buining, 1941
- Echinocactus subgibbosus Haw., 1831 (basionym)
- Echinocactus thrincogonos Lem., 1839
- Echinocactus thrincogonus var. elatior Lem., 1839
- Echinocactus valparaiso C.F.Först., 1846
- Euporteria acutissima (Otto & A.Dietr.) Kreuz. & Buining, 1941
- Euporteria castaneoides (Cels ex Salm-Dyck) Kreuz. & Buining, 1941
- Euporteria heteracantha (Backeb.) Kreuz. & Buining, 1941
- Euporteria subcylindrica (Backeb.) Kreuz. & Buining, 1941
- Hildmannia rostrata (Jacobi) Kreuz. & Buining, 1941
- Mammillaria floribunda Hook., 1838
- Mammillaria gibbosa Salm-Dyck, 1834
- Neochilenia rostrata (Jacobi) Backeb., 1951
- Neoporteria acutissima (Otto & A.Dietr.) Borg, 1937
- Neoporteria castaneoides (Cels ex Salm-Dyck) Werderm., 1938
- Neoporteria exsculpta (Otto ex Pfeiff.) Borg, 1951
- Neoporteria heteracantha (Backeb.) W.T.Marshall, 1941
- Neoporteria litoralis var. intermedia F.Ritter, 1966
- Neoporteria litoralis var. robustispina Y.Itô, 1981, sin tipo
- Neoporteria microsperma F.Ritter, 1963
- Neoporteria microsperma var. graciana F.Ritter, 1980
- Neoporteria microsperma var. serenana F.Ritter & Y.Itô, 1981, sin tipo
- Neoporteria nigrihorrida var. minor Backeb., 1951
- Neoporteria subcylindrica (Backeb.) Backeb., 1951
- Neoporteria subgibbosa (Haw.) Britton & Rose, 1922
- Neoporteria subgibbosa f. castaneoides (Cels ex Salm-Dyck) Donald & G.D.Rowley, 1966
- Neoporteria subgibbosa var. chionacantha Y.Itô, 1981, sin tipo
- Neoporteria subgibbosa f. heteracantha (Backeb.) Donald & G.D.Rowley, 1966
- Neoporteria subgibbosa var. intermedia (F.Ritter) A.E.Hoffm., 1989
- Neoporteria subgibbosa f. microsperma (F.Ritter) Donald & G.D.Rowley, 1966
- Neoporteria subgibbosa var. orientalis F.Ritter, 1966
- Neoporteria subgibbosa f. serenana (F.Ritter & Y.Itô) Donald & G.D.Rowley, 1966, not published validly
- Neoporteria subgibbosa f. subcylindrica (Backeb.) Donald & G.D.Rowley, 1966
- Neoporteria wagenknechtii var. microsperma (F.Ritter) A.E.Hoffm., 1989
- Neoporteria wagenknechtii var. napina F.Ritter, 1963}}

== Conservation status ==
On the IUCN Red List, Eriosyce subgibbosa is classified as being Least Concern (LC). This signifies that it currently does not face an immediate risk of extinction because of its relatively large and stable populations within its range.

This species is common and abundant, and studies indicate that its population is currently relatively stable. However, there do exist threats that may locally affect certain populations. These include habitat destruction and fragmentation from coastal urban development, the poaching of specimens for ornamental purposes, and the construction of roads. Although these are generally localized and do not currently threaten the survival of Eriosyce subgibbosa on a global scale, continuous monitoring is recommended to prevent any possible long-term negative effects.

== Cultivation ==
Eriosyce subgibbosa is cultivated mainly as an ornamental. It grows slowly and during the summer; this makes it relatively easy to cultivate provided that its environmental requirements are met. Its xerophilic nature makes it sensitive to overwatering, especially in poorly-ventilated environments.

This species requires a mineral substrate which is sandy and very porous with excellent drainage. It grows best in intense full sun, although it can tolerate some slight shading; insufficient lighting leads to weak, etiolated growth. It is very heat-tolerant and needs moderate watering during the summer; one must do this with caution, as adult specimens are susceptible to rot, especially after being transplanted. During the winter, it should be kept completely dry.

It should be fertilized using cactus fertilizer low in nitrogen and with a high proportion of potassium once per growing season; it can thrive in poor soils. It requires dry and well-ventilated environments, and the combination of humidity and poor ventilation can lead to problems such as rot and fungal diseases.

It prefers warm temperatures, with a minimum recommended winter temperature of 5 ºC (41 ºF), although it can tolerate temperatures down to 0 ºC (32 ºF) if its substrate is dry. Under good conditions, it is affected by few pests, but these may include red spider mites or mealybugs. Root rot is the most significant risk associated with improper cultivation. It may be propagated via seed or grafting. The seeds germinate best in spring on sandy, well-drained substrates with controlled levels of humidity. Grafting speeds the growth rate, decreases the risk of root rot, and makes cultivation easier overall.

== Gallery ==
Plants in habitat

Plant size

Plant growing in the cracks of a rock

Plant in flower

Plant with developing fruits
