= Luigi Aloysius Colla =

Piemontese lawyer, politician and botanist (1766–1848)

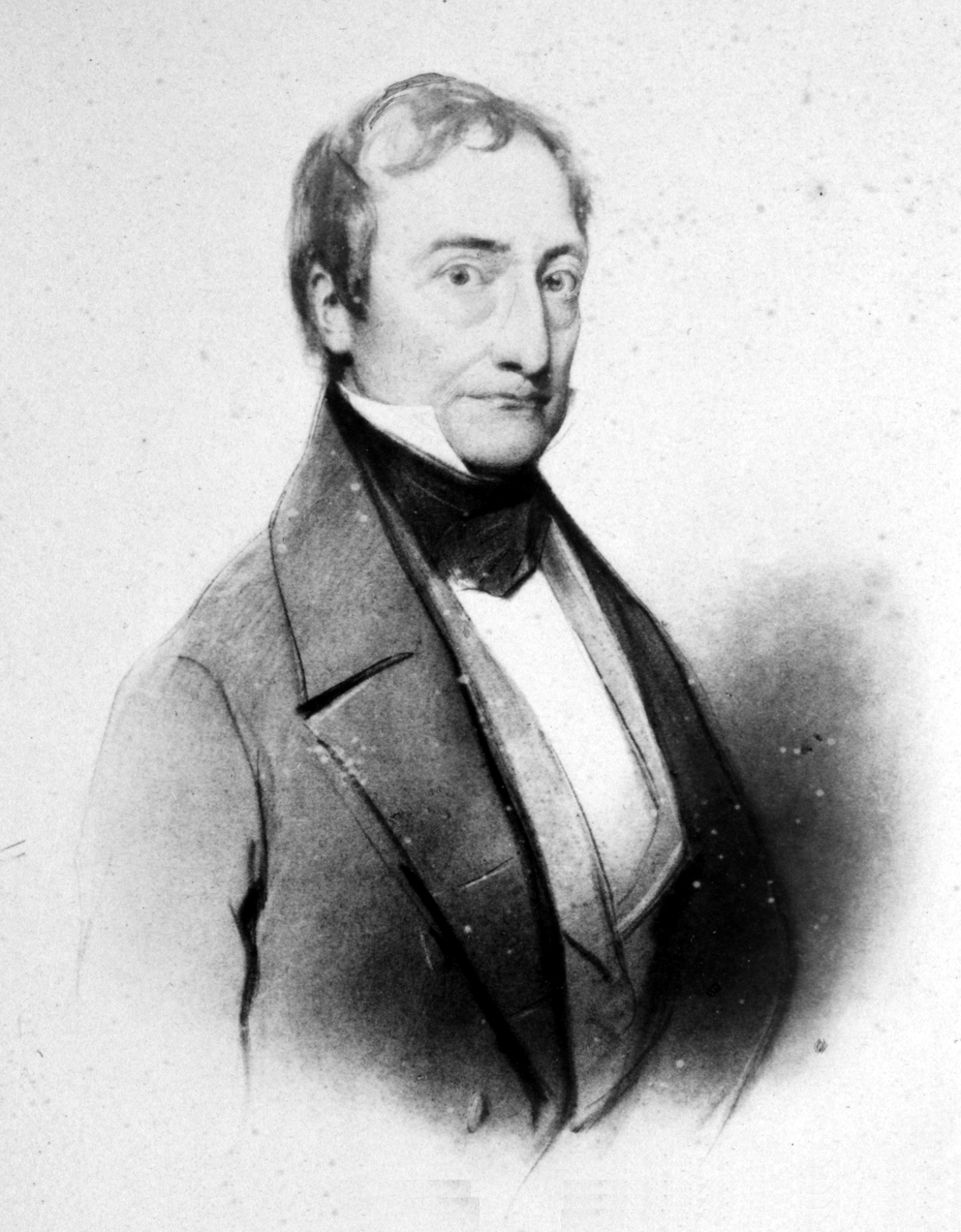
- Luigi Aloysius Colla
- Born: Luigi Aloysius Colla; 30 April 1766; Turin, Duchy of Savoy
- Died: 23 December 1848 (aged 82); Turin, Kingdom of Sardinia
- Occupations: botanist, lawyer, politician
- Known for: description of species on which most cultivars of bananas are based

Luigi Aloysius Colla (30 April 1766 – 23 December 1848) was an Italian botanist of the late 18th and early 19th centuries. He was a member of the Provisional Government of Savoy from December 12, 1798, to April 2, 1799, taking his turn as chairman of the government in rotation for a ten-day term. In 1820 Colla described two species, Musa balbisiana and Musa acuminata, that are the basis for almost all cultivated bananas. Colla was a member of the Philadelphia Academy of Natural Sciences.

== Bibliography ==
- L'antolegista botanico - Turin - Volume 1, Volume 5, Volume 6
- Memoria sul genere Musa e monografia del medesimo - Turin
- Observations sur le Limodorum purpureum de M. de Lamarck et création d'un nouveau genre dans la famille des Orchidées - Paris : Imprimerie Lebel
- Hortus Ripulensis seu enumeratio plantarum quae Ripulis coluntur - Ed. Augustae Taurinorum
- Mémoire sur le Melanopsidium Nigrum des jardiniers, et formation d'un genre nouveau dans la famille des rubiacées (1825)
- Illustrationes et icones rariorum stirpium quae in ejus horto Ripulis florebant, anno 1826, addita ad hortum Ripulensem appendice III (1826)
- avec Carlo Giuseppe Bertero - Plantae rariores in regionibus chilensibus - Deux tomes - Ex regia typographia (1832–1833)
- Herbarium Pedemontanum juxta Methodum Naturalem Dispositum Additis - Ed. Augustae Taurinorum - Tome 1 (1833), Tome 2 (1834), Tome 3 (1834), Tome 4, Tome 6 (1836), Tome 7, Tome 8
- Osservazioni sovra una notizia pubblicata nel Messaggiere del 17 agosto 1842, num. 35 dal sig. Paolo Emilio Colombo circa l'Elephantusia macrocarpa del Willd (1842)
- Observations sur la famille des rutacées : sur le genre Correa et formation du nouveau genre Antommarchia (1843)
- Camelliografia ossia tentavio di una nuova disposizione naturale delle varietà della Camellia del Giappone - Turin
