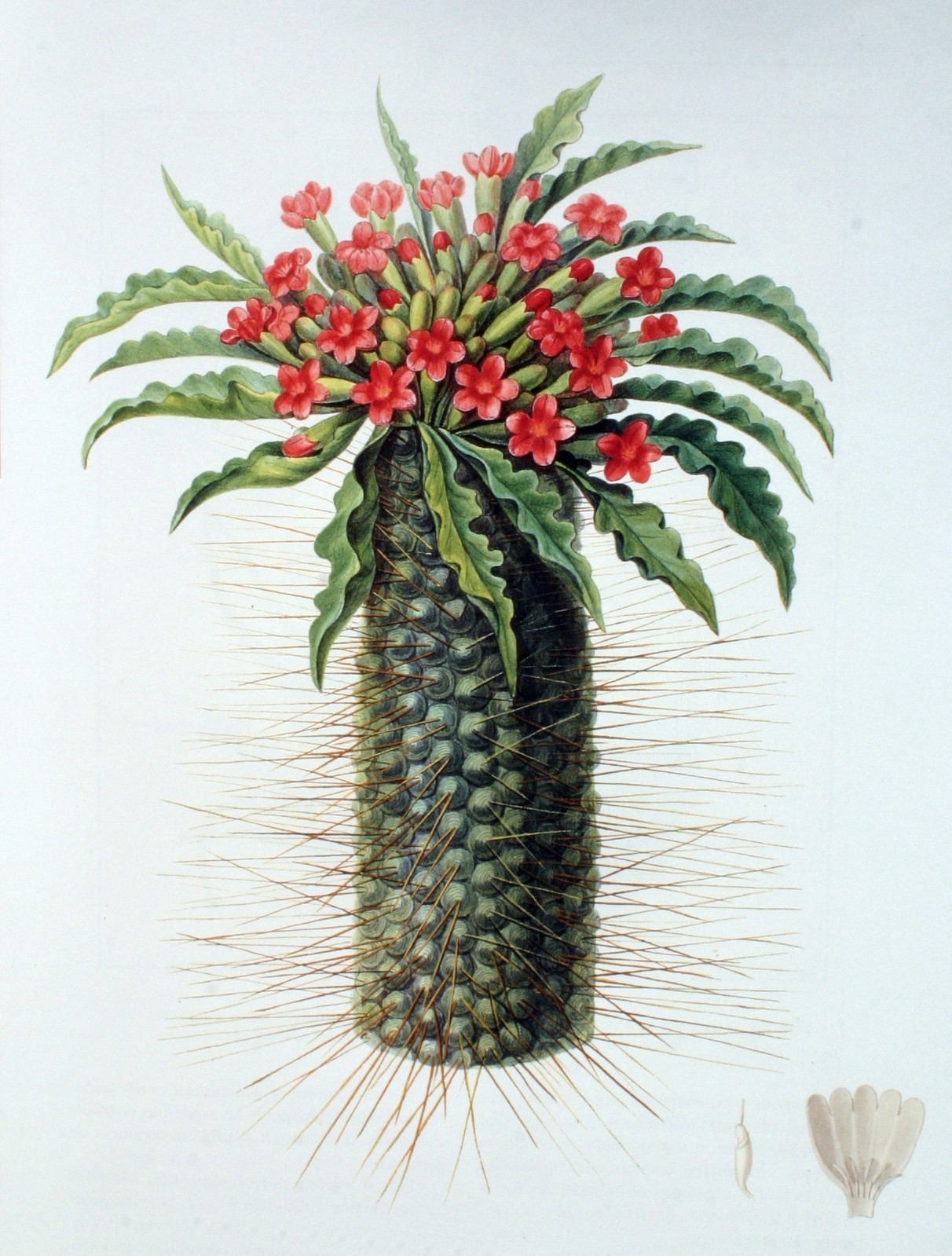
- Foliage and flowers of P. namaquanum
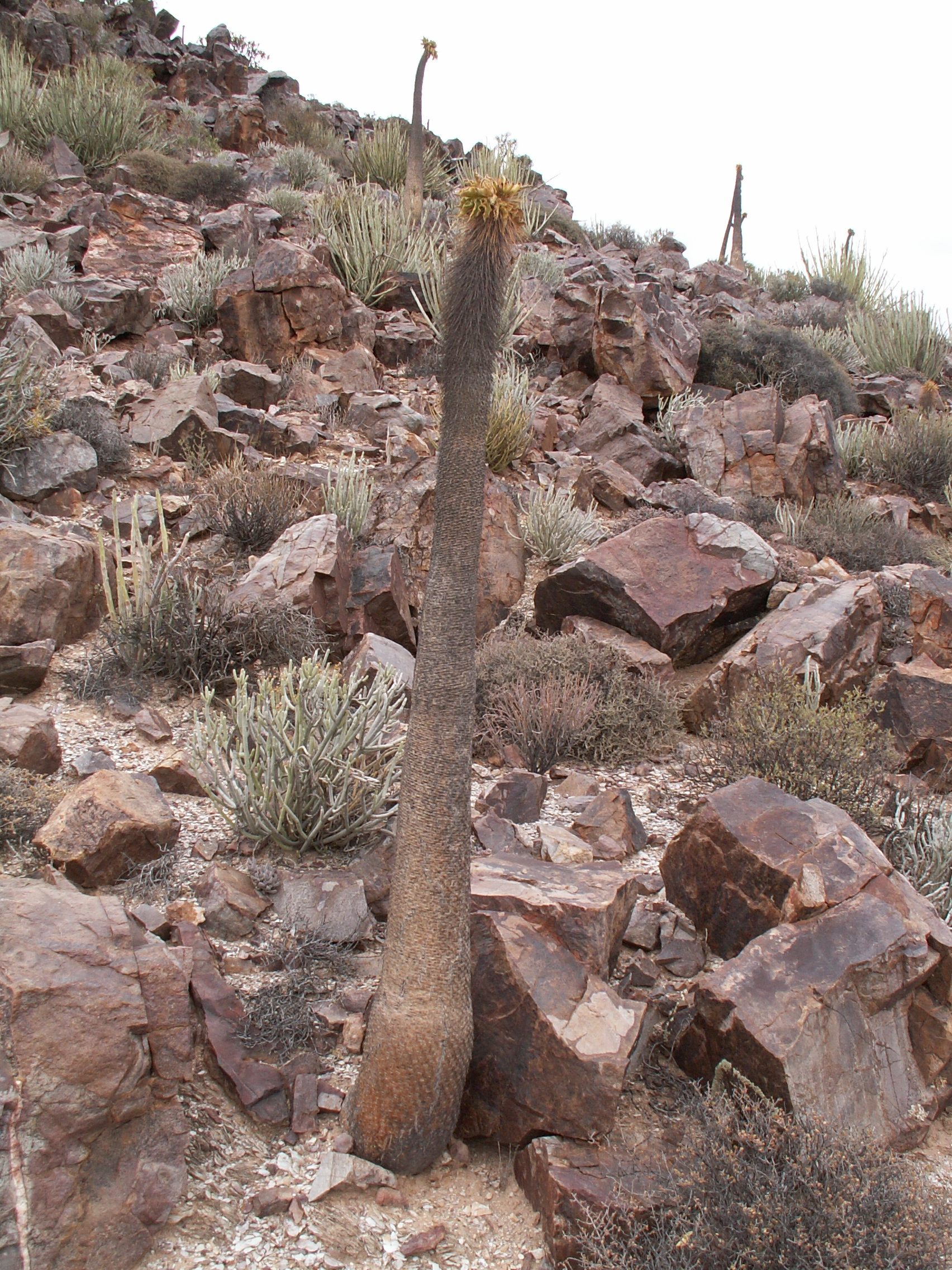
- Habit in Richtersveld National Park

Conservation status
- Least Concern (IUCN 3.1)

Scientific classification
- Kingdom: Plantae
- Clade: Embryophytes
- Clade: Tracheophytes
- Clade: Spermatophytes
- Clade: Angiosperms
- Clade: Eudicots
- Clade: Asterids
- Order: Gentianales
- Family: Apocynaceae
- Genus: Pachypodium
- Species: P. namaquanum

Binomial name
- Pachypodium namaquanum (Wyley ex Harv.) Welw.
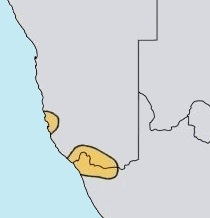
- native range of P. namaquanum

Synonyms
- Adenium namaquanum Wyley ex Harv.

= Pachypodium namaquanum =

Species of tree

Pachypodium namaquanum, also known as halfmens or elephant's trunk, is a Southern African succulent plant in the Dogbane family (Apocynaceae). The genus name Pachypodium is from the Greek for 'thick foot', an allusion to its swollen base, while the species name namaquanum is a reference to Namaqualand.

== Distribution ==
The succulent plant is native to the arid, rocky mountains of the Richtersveld in the Northern Cape of South Africa and in southern Namibia.

It is found in its greatest numbers in the Gariep Centre which has the greatest variety of succulents on earth. Rainfall here occurs mainly in winter and varies from 50 to 150 mm. Extremely arid conditions are to be found in the rain shadows of certain mountain ranges where the rainfall may be 15 mm or less. Thick fog moving inland from the Atlantic coast can add to the precipitation. Temperatures in summer may reach 50 °C.

== Description ==
Pachypodium namaquanum is a succulent single-stemmed plant growing to 2.5 metres (8.2 ft) tall, occasionally up to 5 m (16 ft). The warty trunk, thickset at the base and tapering to the top, is densely covered in sharp spines. Where damaged, the trunk produces side-branches that immediately curve back to the vertical. The very top of the plant is usually bent to the north, similar to the South American cactus Copiapoa cinerea.

There is a crown or tuft of undulate leaves at the apex of the trunk during the growing season which is throughout the winter months. The rosette of leaves is small out of all proportion to the size of the plant.

The tubular velvet-textured flowers appear from August to October and result in twin seedpods in a V-shape. This split down one side to release the wind-dispersed plumed seeds. Seen from a distance, the plant has the appearance of a person trudging up a slope whence its common name of halfmens (Afrikaans for 'semi-human'). It is also called elephant's trunk.

=== Conservation ===
The plant is CITES-listed as an Appendix 1 and 2 species, prohibiting trade unless the necessary certificates and permits have been obtained. The removal of this species by collectors poses a distinct threat to its survival.

=== Relationships ===
This plant belongs to the Apocynaceae family. There are 23 species of Pachypodium of which 18 occur in Madagascar and 5 in southern Africa - three of these are succulent spiny shrubs while Pachypodium lealii, also tree-sized, occurs in the Kaokoveld in Namibia.

== Gallery ==
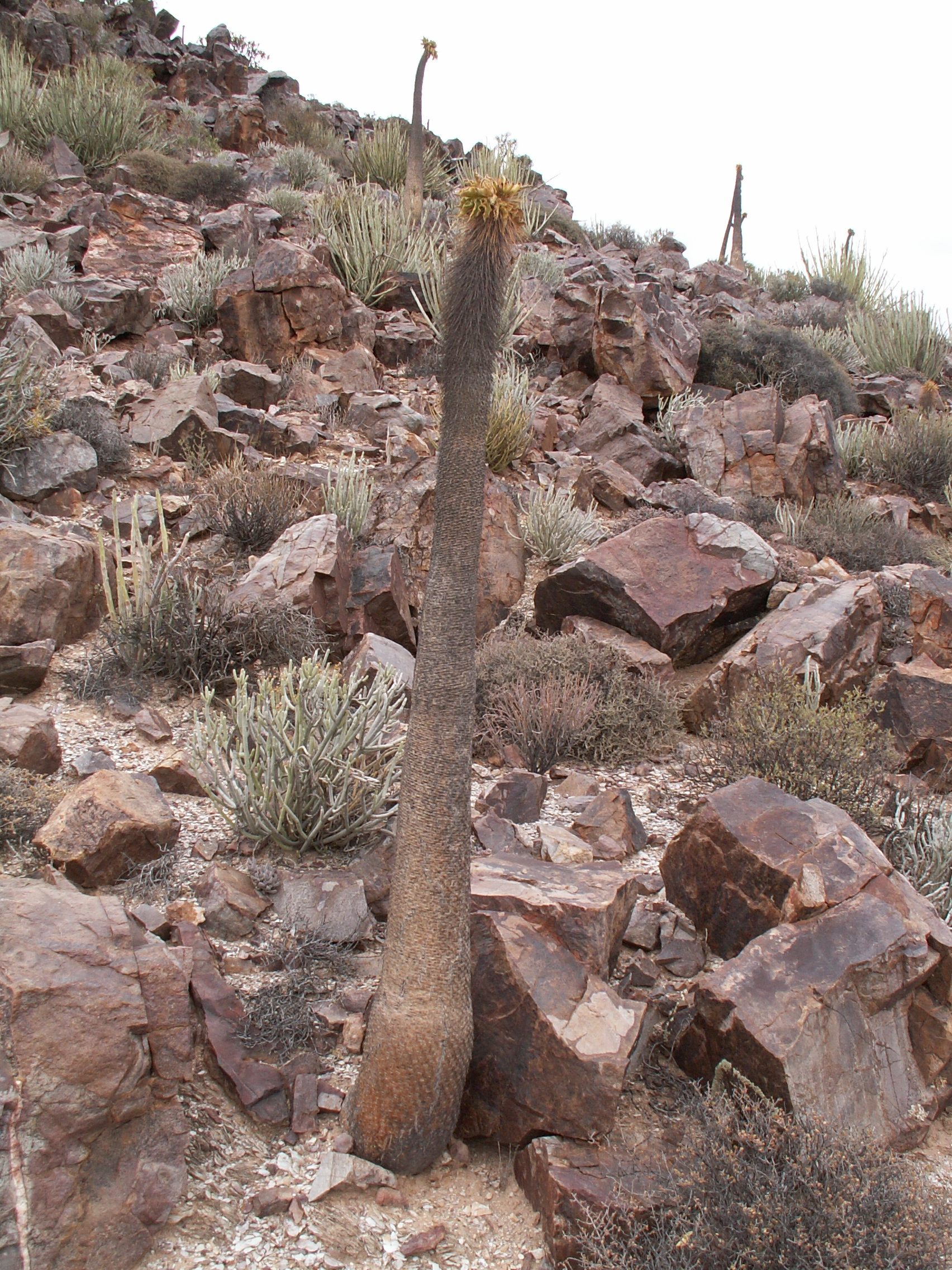
Richtersveld, South Africa

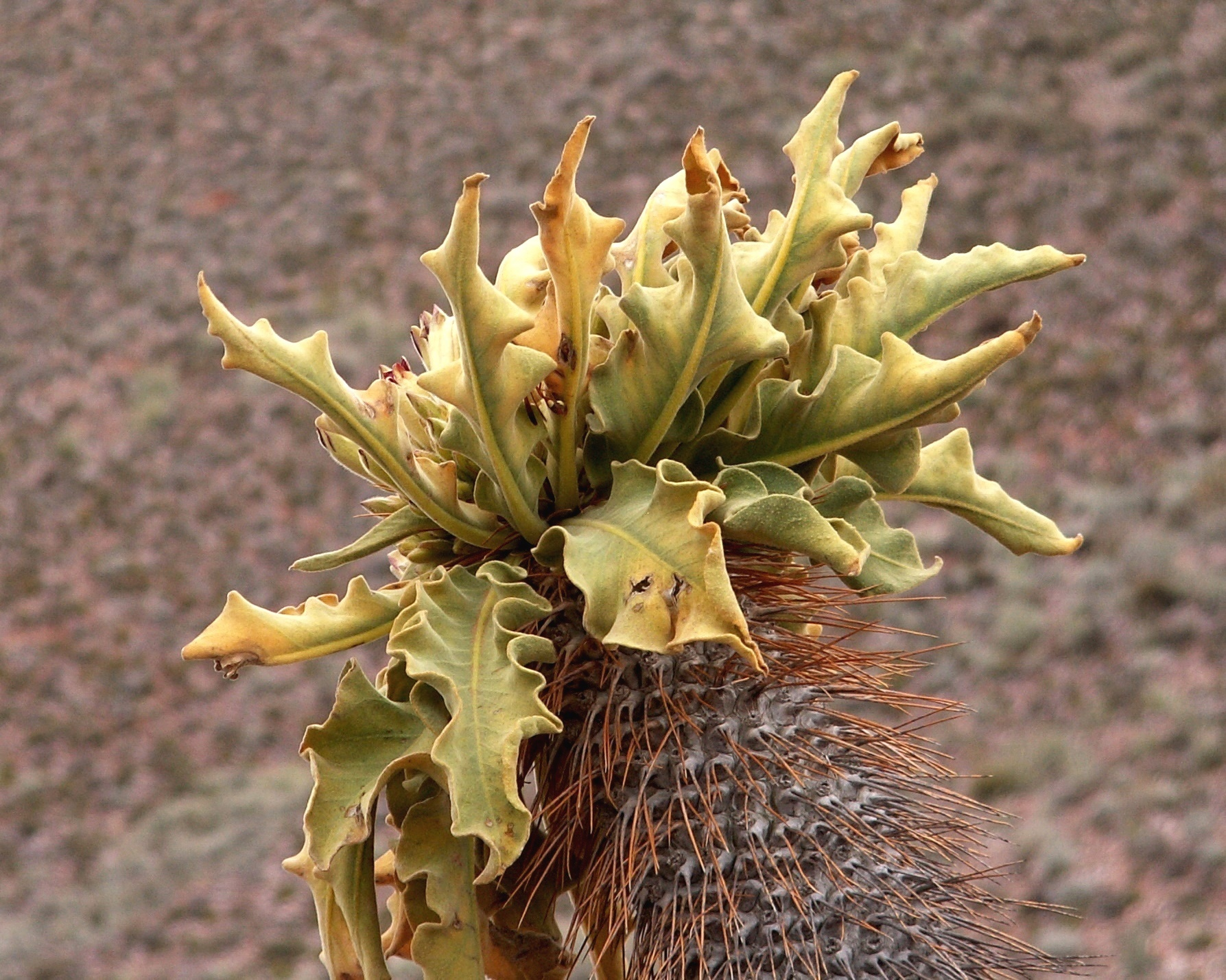
Richtersveld, South Africa

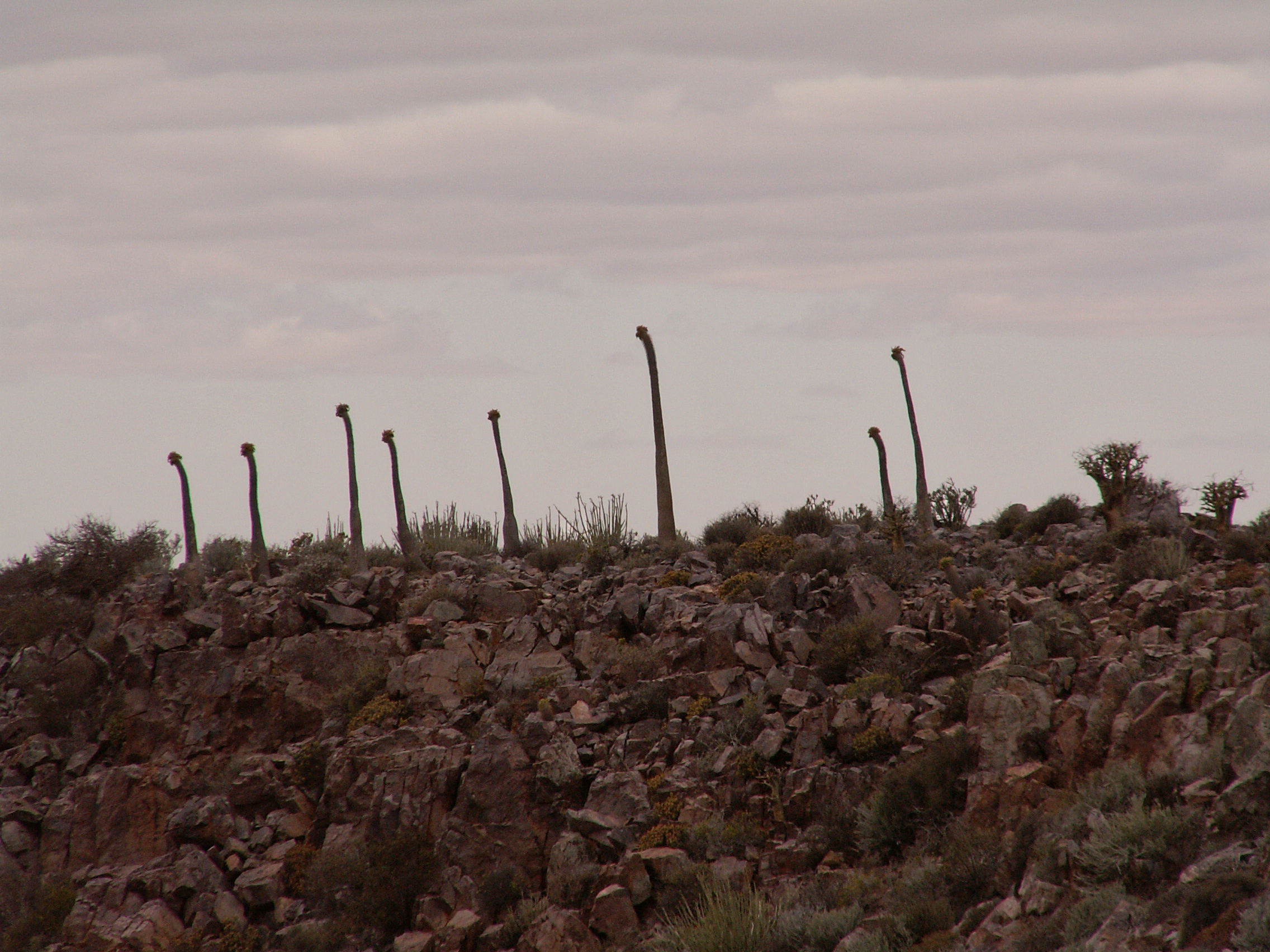
Richtersveld, South Africa

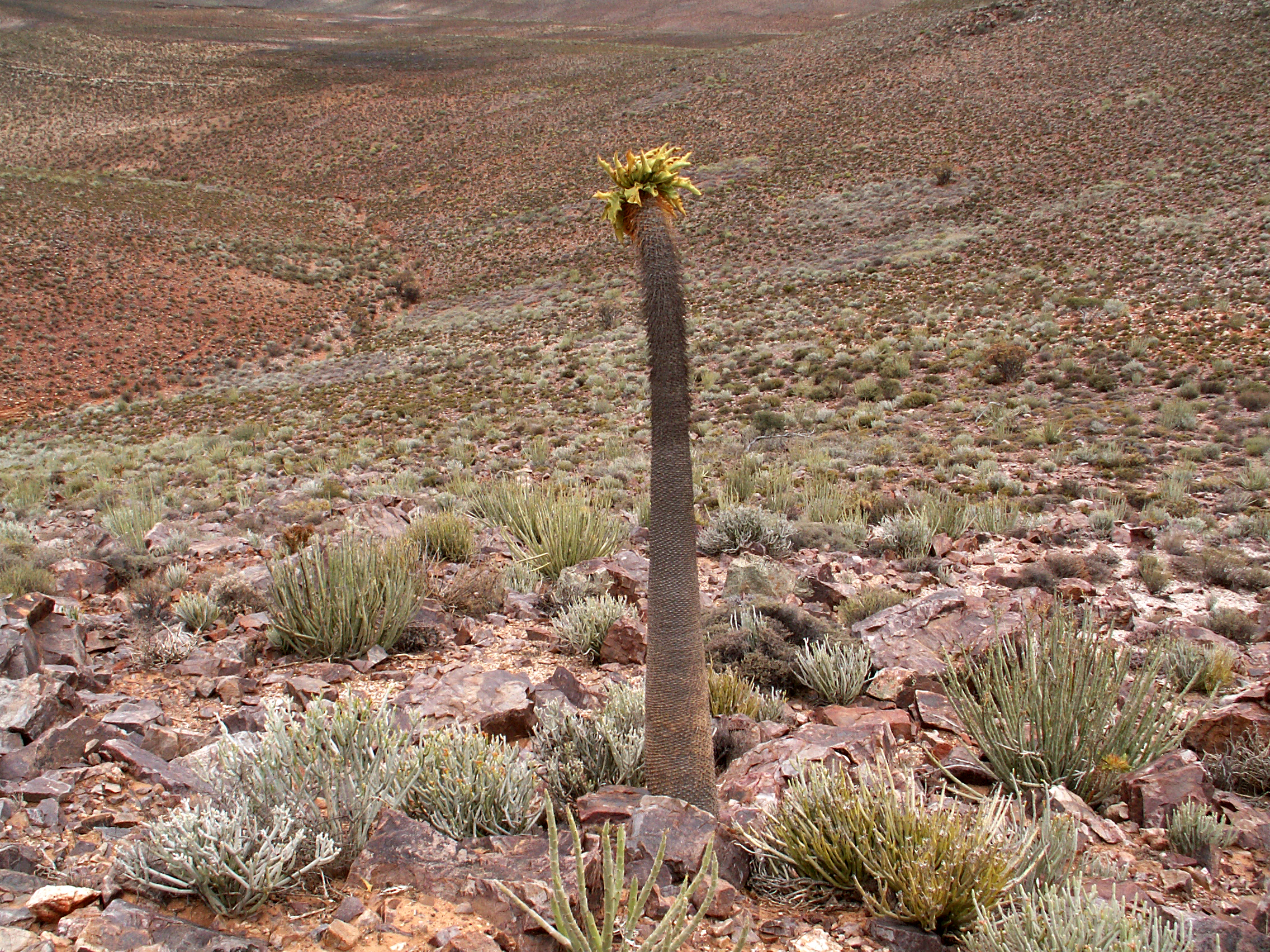
Richtersveld, South Africa
