= Fernando Leal =

Fernando Leal may refer to:

- Fernando da Costa Leal (1846-1910), Portuguese army officer, writer and botanist
- Fernando Leal (artist) (1896-1964), Mexican mural painter and artist
- Fernando Leal Audirac (born 1958), Mexican visual artist, sculptor and designer and son of eponymous artist born 1896
- Fernando Leal (footballer) (born 1981), Brazilian footballer
