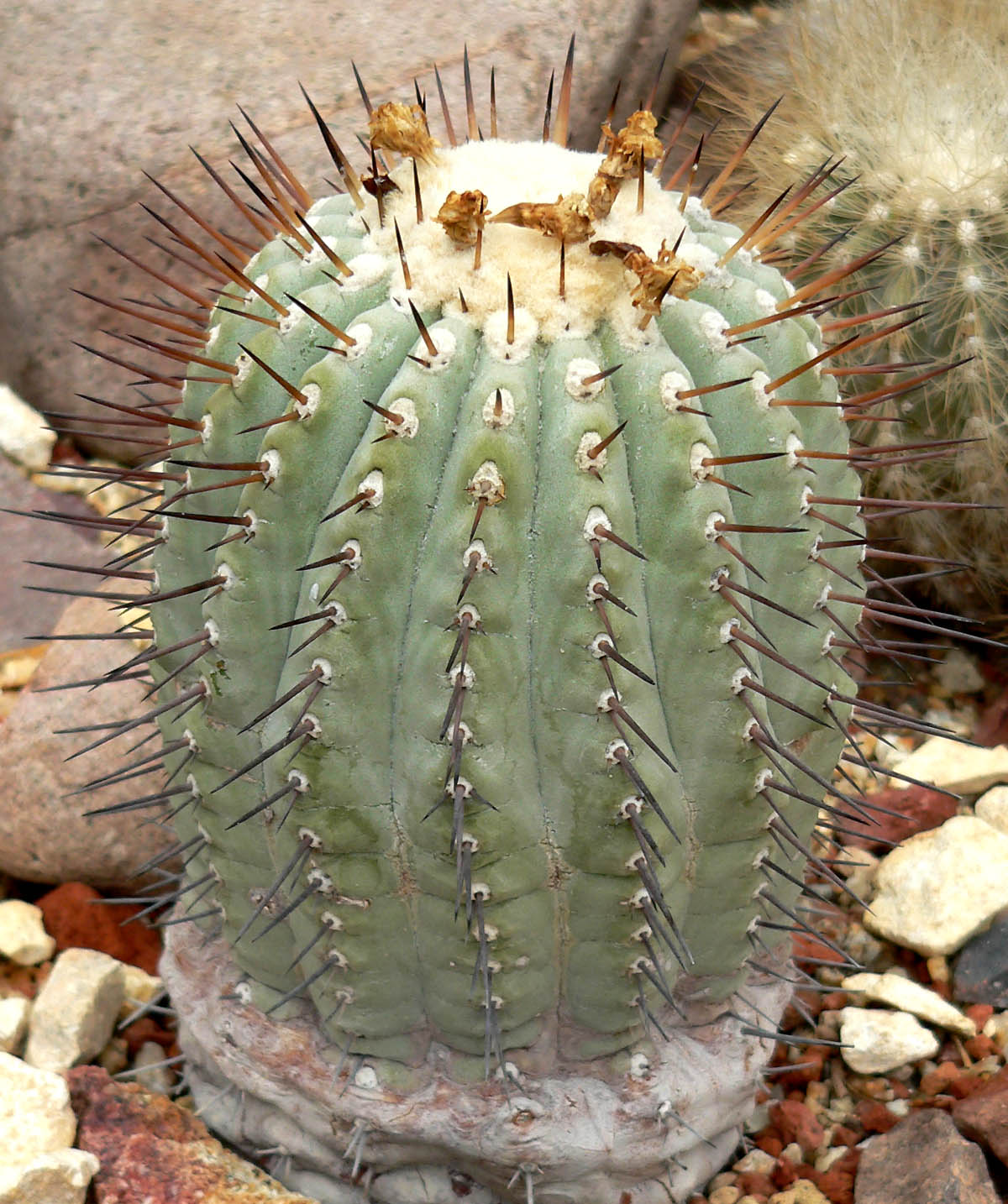

Conservation status
- Least Concern (IUCN 3.1)

Scientific classification
- Kingdom: Plantae
- Clade: Embryophytes
- Clade: Tracheophytes
- Clade: Angiosperms
- Clade: Eudicots
- Order: Caryophyllales
- Family: Cactaceae
- Subfamily: Cactoideae
- Genus: Copiapoa
- Species: C. cinerea

Binomial name
- Copiapoa cinerea (Britton & Rose, 1922

= Copiapoa cinerea =

Species of cactus

Copiapoa cinerea is a species of plant in the genus Copiapoa in the family Cactaceae. The epithet cinerea comes from the Latin word for ash, by reference to the color of the epidermis.

== Description ==
This cactus is globular, fleshy, and perennial, then columnar up to 1 m (3.3 ft) tall, 20 cm (7.9 in) in diameter, with 30 ribs. Typical of this species, and characteristic, is the production of a white-colored waxy cuticle, for which the plants in its habitat are decidedly white-grey in color, hence the specific epithet. The light coloration is a protection against desiccation. In culture, the epidermis is often greenish. Its thorns can assume different colors, depending on the populations, however Copiapoa cinerea is generally black or dark brown. Only old plants offset from the base.

Flowers are yellow, with a diameter of 2.5 cm (0.98 in), at the top of the plants.The fruit ripens between wools, and is only visible when ripening has already occurred.

== Subspecies ==
Image	Name	Distribution
	Copiapoa cinerea subsp. cinerea	Chile (Antofagasta to Atacama)
	Copiapoa cinerea subsp. columna-alba (F.Ritter) D.R.Hunt	Chile (SW. Antofagasta to Atacama)
	Copiapoa cinerea subsp. krainziana (F.Ritter) Slaba	Chile (SW. Antofagasta to Atacama)
	Copiapoa cinerea nothosubsp. scopa (Doweld) M.H.J.van der Meer (C. cinerea subsp. cinerea × C. cinerea subsp. krainziana)	Chile (Antofagasta)

== Distribution ==
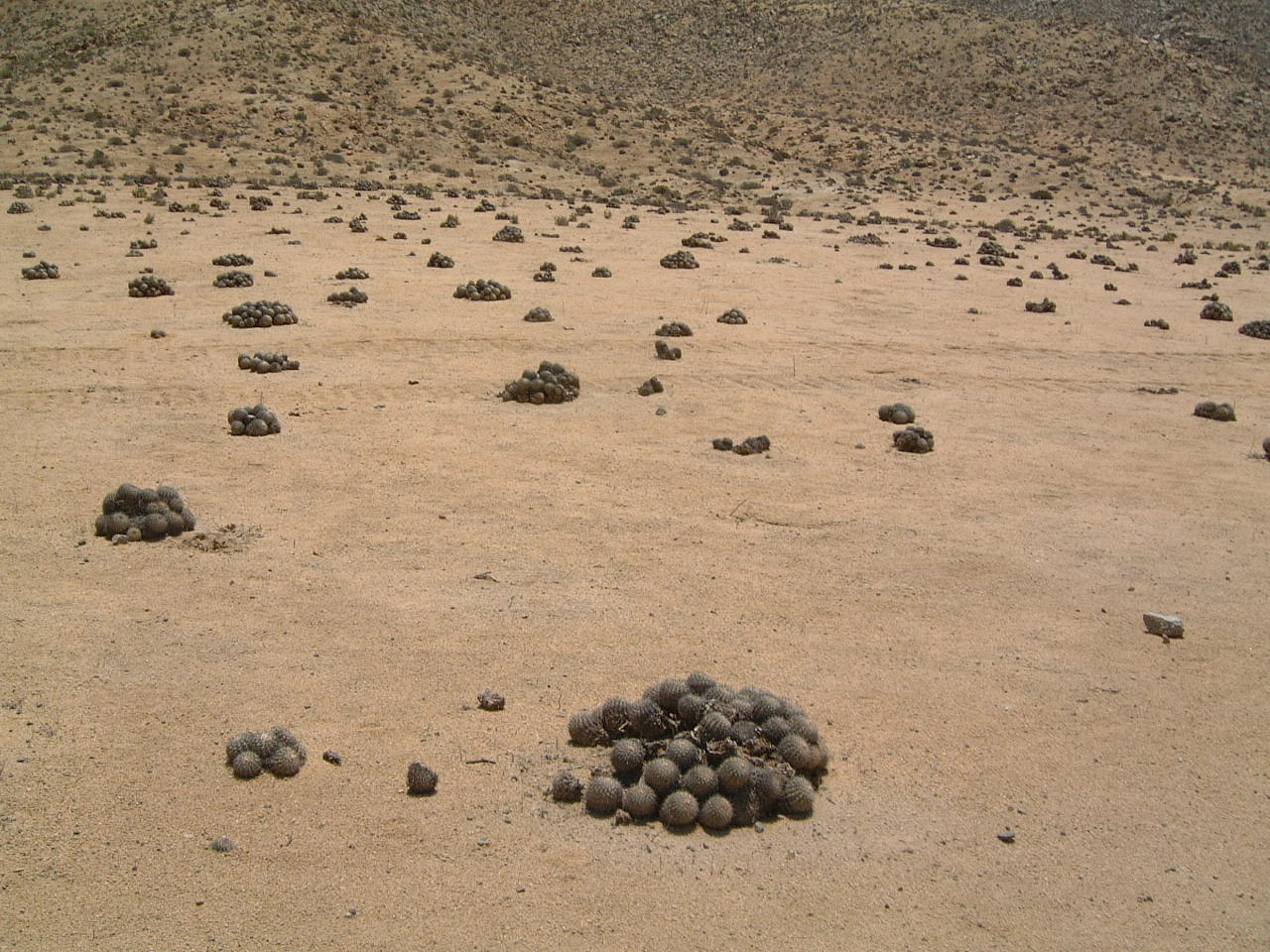
Copiapoa cinerea growing in Pan de Azúcar National Park

It comes from the region of Antofagasta and the coastal zones of northern Chile. The area is very arid. However, there are dense fogs, due to cold streams of the Pacific Ocean. These fogs are frequent, in early morning or late afternoon at an altitude between 500 and 850 m (1,640 and 2,790 ft).

The species is classified as Least Concern (LC) in the IUCN Red List of Threatened Species.

== Cultivation ==
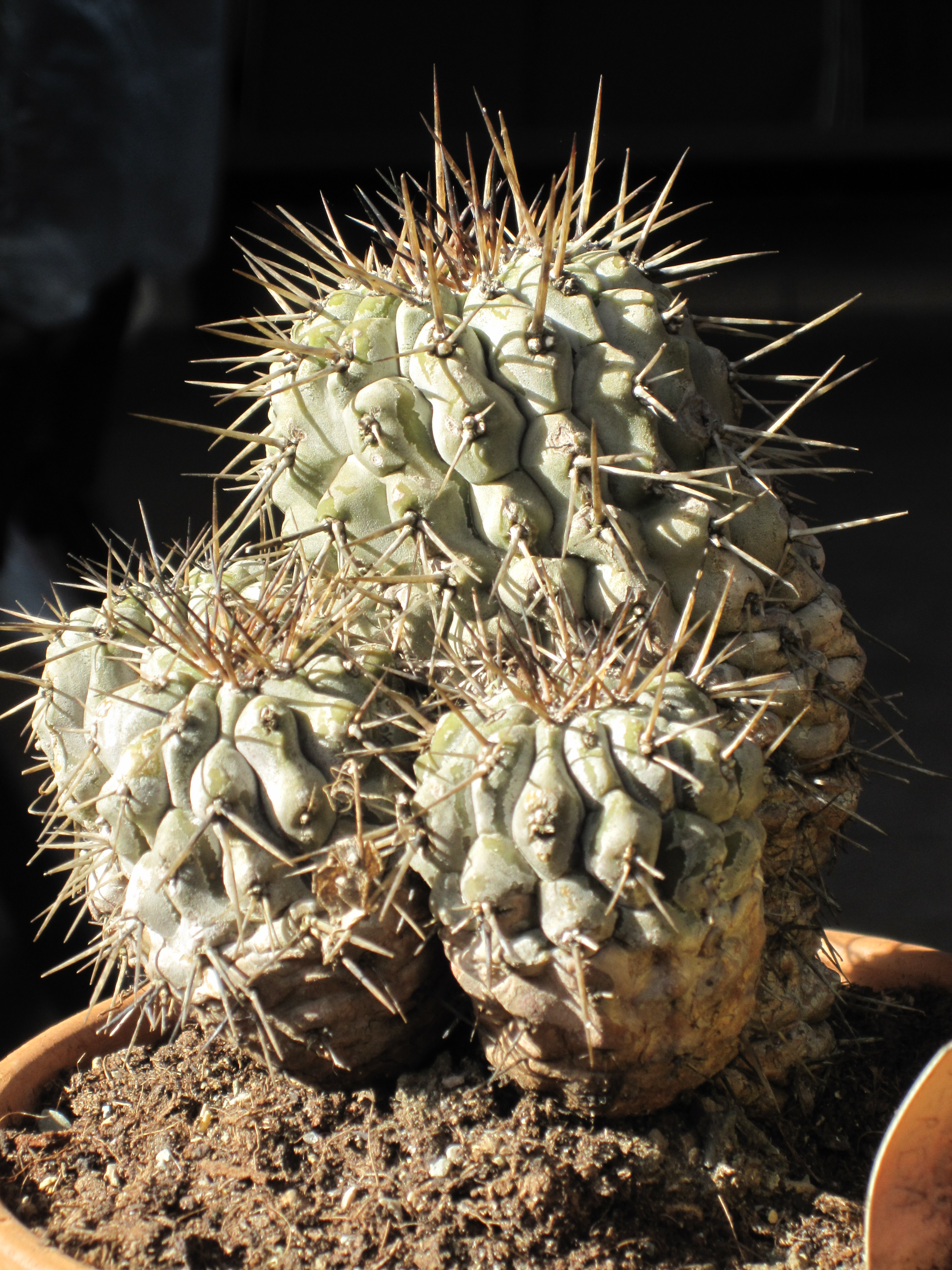
An old Copiapoa cinerea

Copiapoa cinerea is slow growing and hard to keep, because of the risk of rotting. Grafting is a solution. It rarely flowers in cultivation. Before all, it needs well drained soils and to be planted in a sunny place, but protection against excessive sun in summer. In summer, it needs light and regular watering, but the soil needs to dry between two waterings. In winter, it has to be kept warm (no less than 8 °C) and absolutely dry.

== Synonyms ==
- Echinocactus cinereus

== Sources ==
- Anderson, Edward F. (2001), The Cactus Family, Pentland, Oregon: Timber Press, ISBN 978-0-88192-498-5
