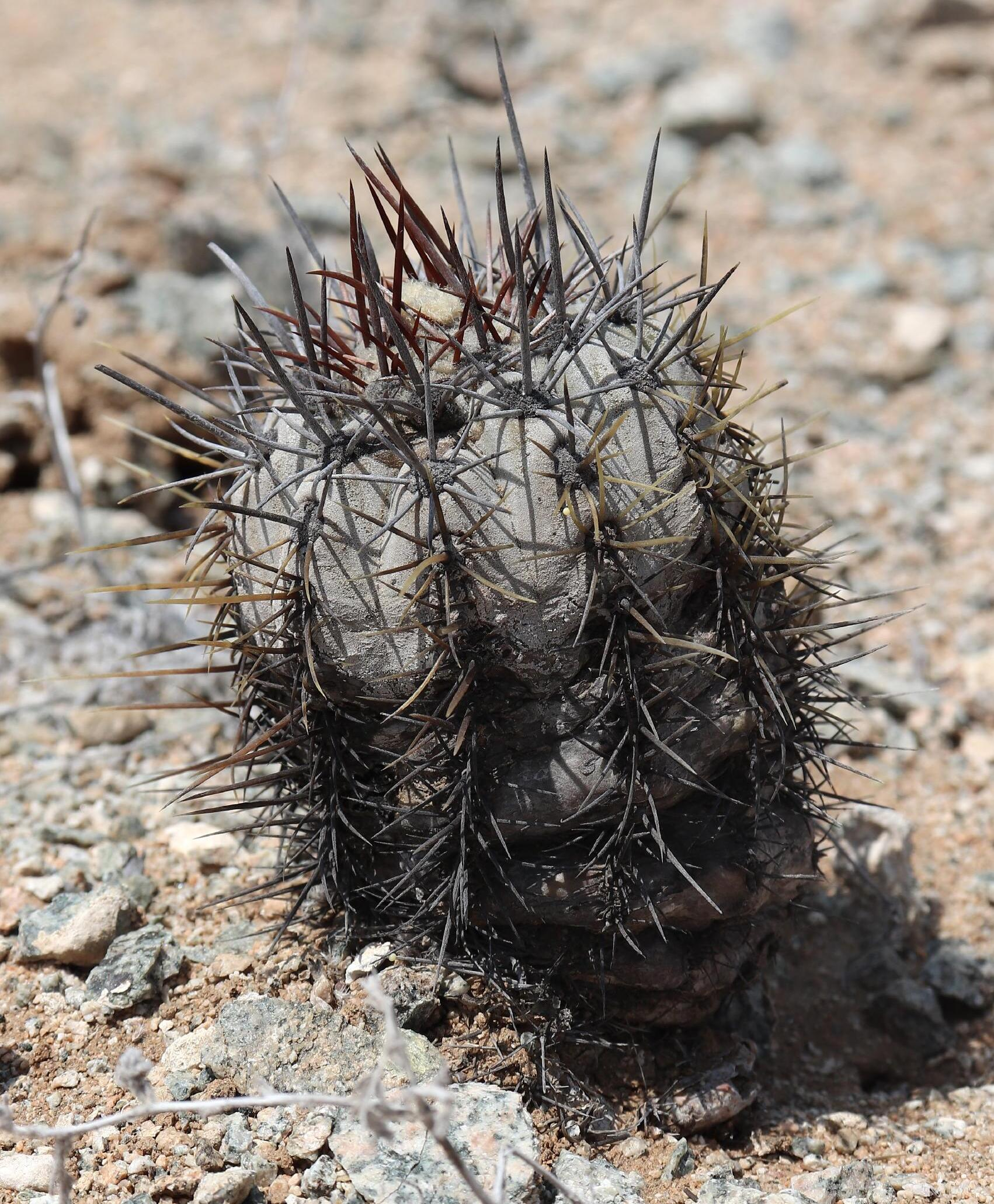

Scientific classification
- Kingdom: Plantae
- Clade: Tracheophytes
- Clade: Angiosperms
- Clade: Eudicots
- Order: Caryophyllales
- Family: Cactaceae
- Subfamily: Cactoideae
- Genus: Copiapoa
- Species: C. atacamensis

Binomial name
- Copiapoa atacamensis Middled.

= Copiapoa atacamensis =

Species of plant

Copiapoa atacamensis is a species of cactus from the Atacama Desert in the province of Antofagasta in northern Chile. Its relationship with other species of Copiapoa, such as C. calderana, is unclear as of April 2012.

== Description ==
Copiapoa atacamensis is a globose cactus, either solitary or clump-forming. Its stems are gray-green with a whitish bloom and are up to 12 cm (5 in) across with 12–16 ribs. Its overall appearance is very spiny. There is a single straight central spine to each areole, 33–38 mm (1.3–1.5 in) long, and five to seven more slender radial spines, 10–12 mm (0.4–0.5 in) long. The fragrant yellow flowers open widely and are 3–3.5 cm (1.2–1.4 in) long. They are followed by green to rose coloured fruits.

Growing in the Atacama Desert, one of the driest places in the world, it has a taproot which is considerably longer than the stem, which it uses for storing water.

== Systematics ==
Copiapoa atacamensis was named by Harry Middleditch in 1980. The relationships among some of the species of Copiapoa are unclear as of April 2012. C. atacamensis has been treated as a subspecies of C. calderana under the name C. calderana subsp. atacamensis; alternatively C. calderana may be reduced to the variety calderana of C. atacamensis. Copiapoa boliviana is given as a synonym of C. atacamensis by some sources; others consider this name to be unresolved or to be a synonym of C. echinoides.
