= Copiapoa megarhiza =

Conservation status
- Endangered (IUCN 3.1)

Scientific classification
- Kingdom: Plantae
- Clade: Tracheophytes
- Clade: Angiosperms
- Clade: Eudicots
- Order: Caryophyllales
- Family: Cactaceae
- Subfamily: Cactoideae
- Genus: Copiapoa
- Species: C. megarhiza

Binomial name
- Copiapoa megarhiza Britton & Rose

Synonyms
- Copiapoa megarhiza var. microrhiza F.Ritter; Copiapoa totoralensis F.Ritter

Species of cactus

Copiapoa megarhiza is a species of succulent flowering plant in the genus Copiapoa, within the family Cactaceae. It is endemic to the Atacama Desert in northern Chile.

== Description ==
Copiapoa megarhiza is a very spiny species of cactus with a solitary or somewhat-branched stem. Its growth form is globose to somewhat elongated, and it is gray-green in color. It measures 10-25 cm in length and 7-10 cm in diameter. Its apex is covered in gray woolly trichomes, and its taproot is large and tuberous.

Woolly apex

This species has 13-17 ribs which are divided into tubercles and slightly widened around the areoles. The areoles are rounded to oval in shape and measure 0.4-0.7 cm in diameter. These have thick spines that are yellow to black in color but turn gray with age. Among these, there are up to 4 especially thick central spines which range from straight to curved and measure up to 4 cm in length. There are also 8-10 somewhat-curved radial spines, which measure up to 3 cm in length.

The flowers are funnel-shaped and yellow in color, measuring up to 3 cm in length. The fruits are olive green in color and egg-shaped, measuring up to 1.5 cm in diameter. They have many wide, fleshy scales near their margins, and some on their lower parts. Inside, the seeds are black and shiny.

== Distribution and habitat ==
Copiapoa megarhiza is native to the Atacama Desert in northern Chile, where it is found in desert or dry scrubland biomes at altitudes of 0 to 800 m above sea level. It grows in alluvial soils and on rocky, north-facing slopes.

== Taxonomy ==
Copiapoa megarhiza was described by the American botanists Nathaniel Lord Britton and Joseph Nelson Rose, who published this name in their book The Cactaceae; descriptions and illustrations of plants of the cactus family 3: 89 in 1922.

Etymology

- Copiapoa: the genus name references the Chilean province of Copiapó in the Atacama Desert, to which most of the species in this genus are native.
- megarhiza: the specific epithet is derived from the Greek words mega (meaning "large") and rhiza (meaning "root"), in reference to this species' large taproot.

== Conservation status ==
On the IUCN Red List, Copiapoa megarhiza is classified as being Endangered (EN).

The main threats faced by this species include illegal poaching and prolonged droughts resulting from the reduction of the time of year during which camanchaca (coastal fog) is present due to climate change, as this fog is the primary water source for these plants. Other threats include industrial, urban, and infrastructural development and the construction of illegal landfills, mainly affecting the northern populations of this species near the city of Copiapó. The species is also threatened by the construction of photovoltaic power stations and their powerlines, as well as the conversion of land for the cultivation of pomegranates.

== Cultivation ==
This species is cultivated mainly as an ornamental. It may be propagated vegetatively via cuttings, or via seed.

== Gallery ==
Plant growing between rocks

Plant growing in a crack

Growth form

Plant growing as a clump

Plant with a developing flower bud
