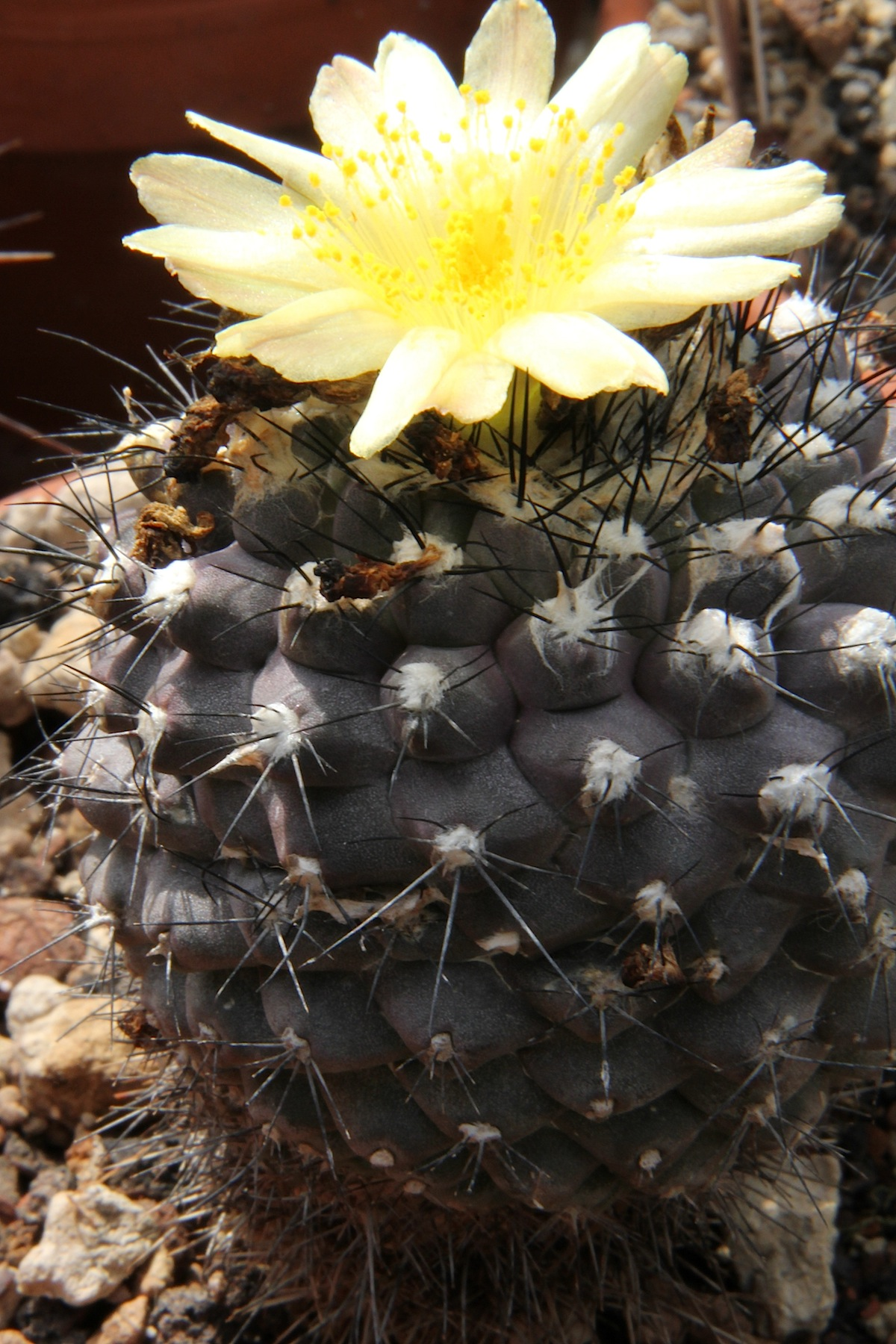
- In bloom

Scientific classification
- Kingdom: Plantae
- Clade: Embryophytes
- Clade: Tracheophytes
- Clade: Angiosperms
- Clade: Eudicots
- Order: Caryophyllales
- Family: Cactaceae
- Subfamily: Cactoideae
- Genus: Copiapoa
- Species: C. hypogaea

Binomial name
- Copiapoa hypogaea F.Ritter

Synonyms
- List: Copiapoa hypogaea var. barquitensis F.Ritter; Neochilenia hypogaea Backeb.; Pilocopiapoa hypogaea (F.Ritter) Y.Itô

= Copiapoa hypogaea =

Species of cactus

Copiapoa hypogaea, the underground copiapoa, is a species of flowering plant in the genus Copiapoa in the cactus family (Cactaceae), native to northern Chile. It has gained the Royal Horticultural Society's Award of Garden Merit.

== Description ==
Copiapoa hypogaea usually grows solitary, occasionally in small groups, rarely protruding above the ground surface, sometimes even completely sunken, with bulbous roots. The individual shoots are depressed spherical. They are grey-brown to greenish in color and 3 to 6.5 centimeters (1.2 to 2.6 in) in diameter. The epidermis is conspicuously wrinkled. The 10 to 14 ribs are slightly twisted, notched broadly flat with chin-like projections. The areoles are sunken and lined with white wool. Spines are mostly absent; sometimes there are from 1 to 6 tiny ones of a blackish color.

The yellow flowers appear at the tip of the shoot and are wide open.

== Subspecies ==
The following subspecies is currently accepted:

- Copiapoa hypogaea subsp. cobrensis Doweld
