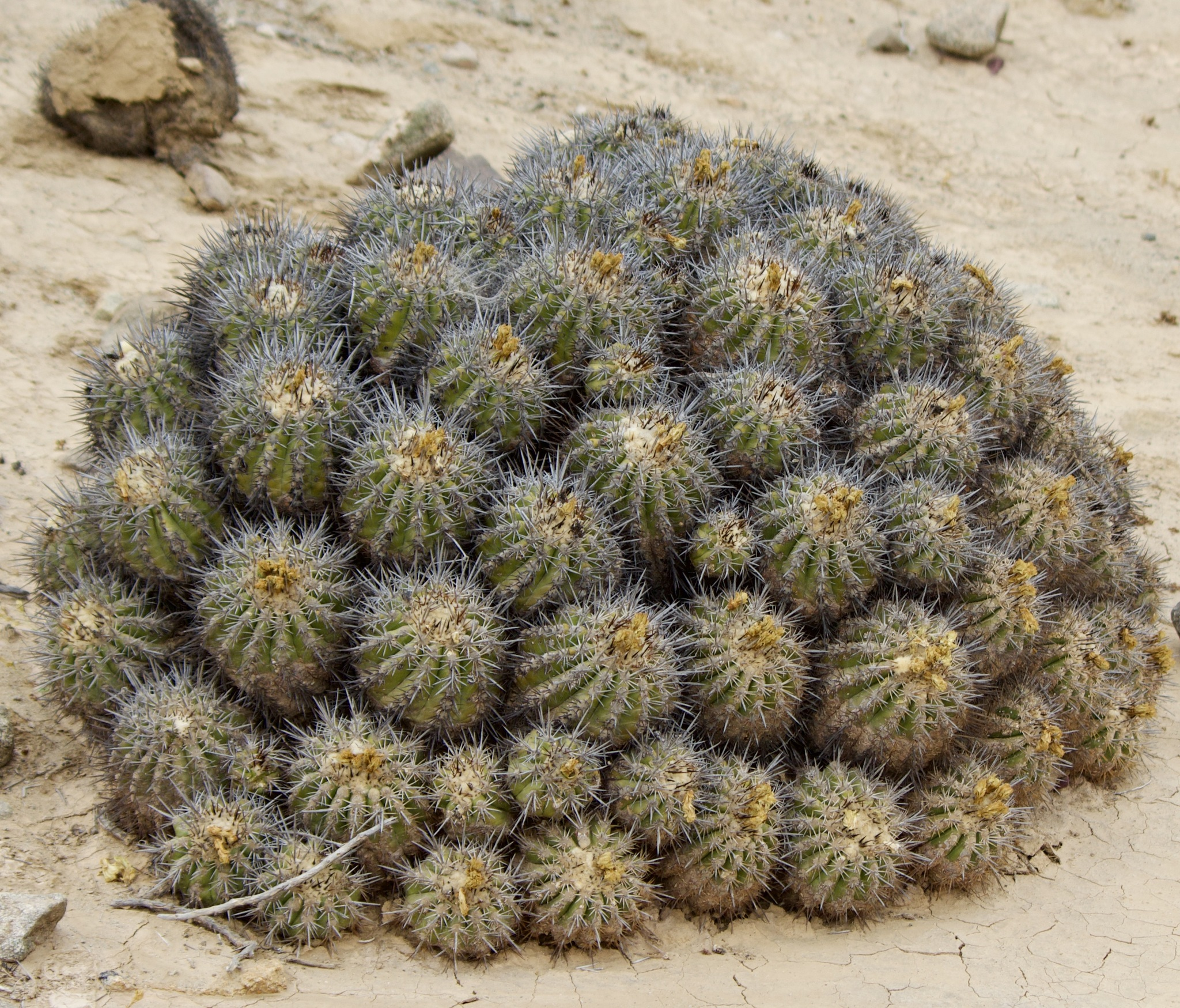

Scientific classification
- Kingdom: Plantae
- Clade: Tracheophytes
- Clade: Angiosperms
- Clade: Eudicots
- Order: Caryophyllales
- Family: Cactaceae
- Subfamily: Cactoideae
- Genus: Copiapoa
- Species: C. coquimbana

Binomial name
- Copiapoa coquimbana Britton & Rose

= Copiapoa coquimbana =

Species of plant

Copiapoa coquimbana is a species of clump-forming cactus native to South America. The plant bears 3 cm (1.2 in) long yellow flowers in summer, and grows up to 60 cm (2 ft) high and 1 m (3 ft) across. The species is named after the city of Coquimbo in Chile. Variations include C. coquimbana var. wagenknechtii, C. coquimbana var. vallenarensis, and C. coquimbana subsp. andina.
