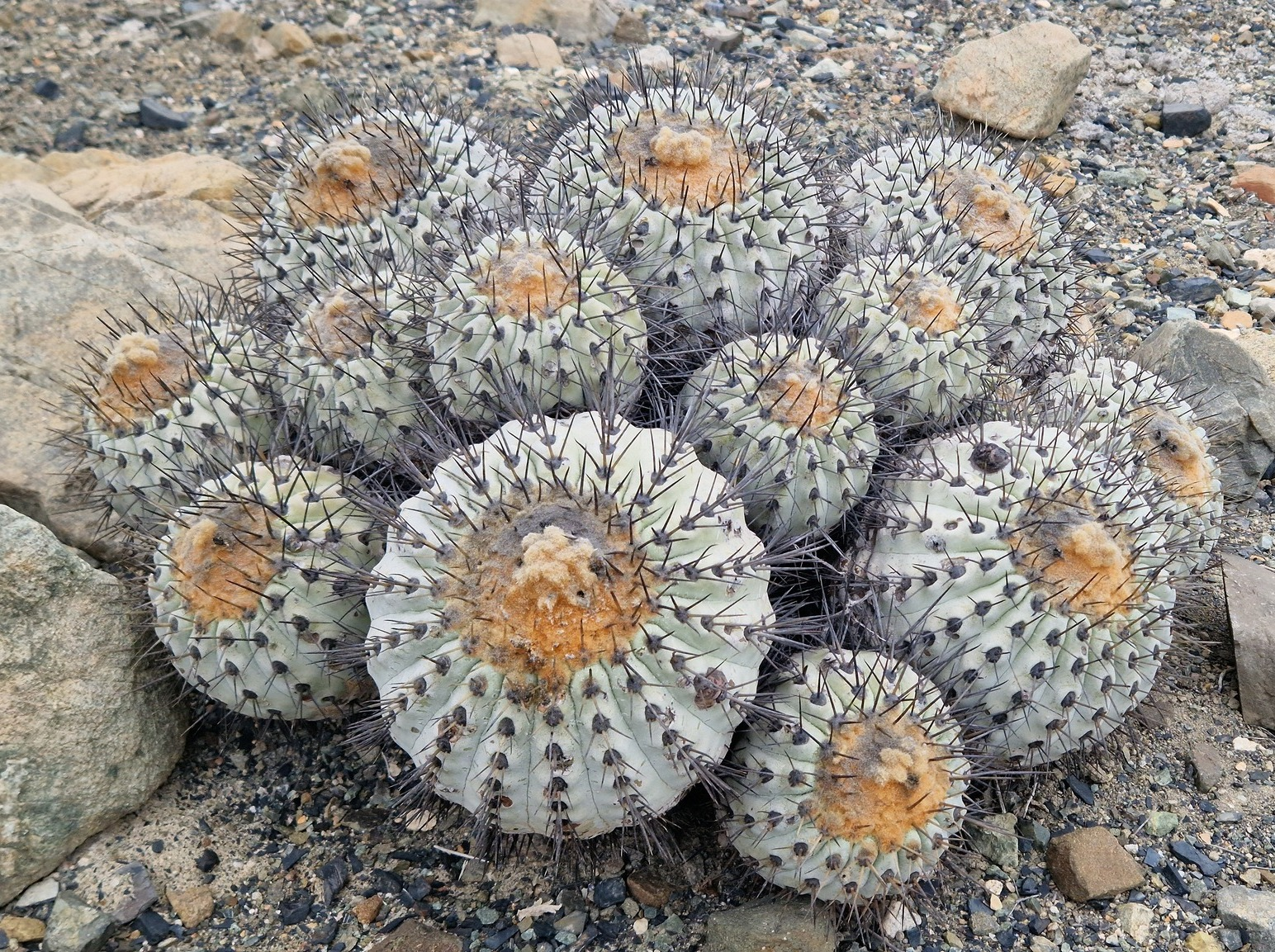

Conservation status
- Vulnerable (IUCN 3.1)

Scientific classification
- Kingdom: Plantae
- Clade: Tracheophytes
- Clade: Angiosperms
- Clade: Eudicots
- Order: Caryophyllales
- Family: Cactaceae
- Subfamily: Cactoideae
- Genus: Copiapoa
- Species: C. gigantea

Binomial name
- Copiapoa gigantea Backeb.

= Copiapoa gigantea =

Species of cactus

Copiapoa gigantea is a species of Copiapoa found from Antofagasta to north Atacama, Chile.

== Description ==
Copiapoa gigantea forms larger groups up to 1.5 meters high and a diameter of up to two meters. The spherical to cylindrical shoots branch out from the base as well as laterally. They are gray-green to gray and reach a diameter of between 12 and 25 centimeters. The 20 to 37 ribs are notched. They flatten out a bit over time. The large areoles are orange. There is a central spine, which can sometimes be absent. The up to nine radial spines are yellowish with a dark tip and up to three centimeters long.

The lemon-yellow flowers are wide open and 2.5 to 4 centimeters long, with a diameter of up to five centimeters. They are odorless.

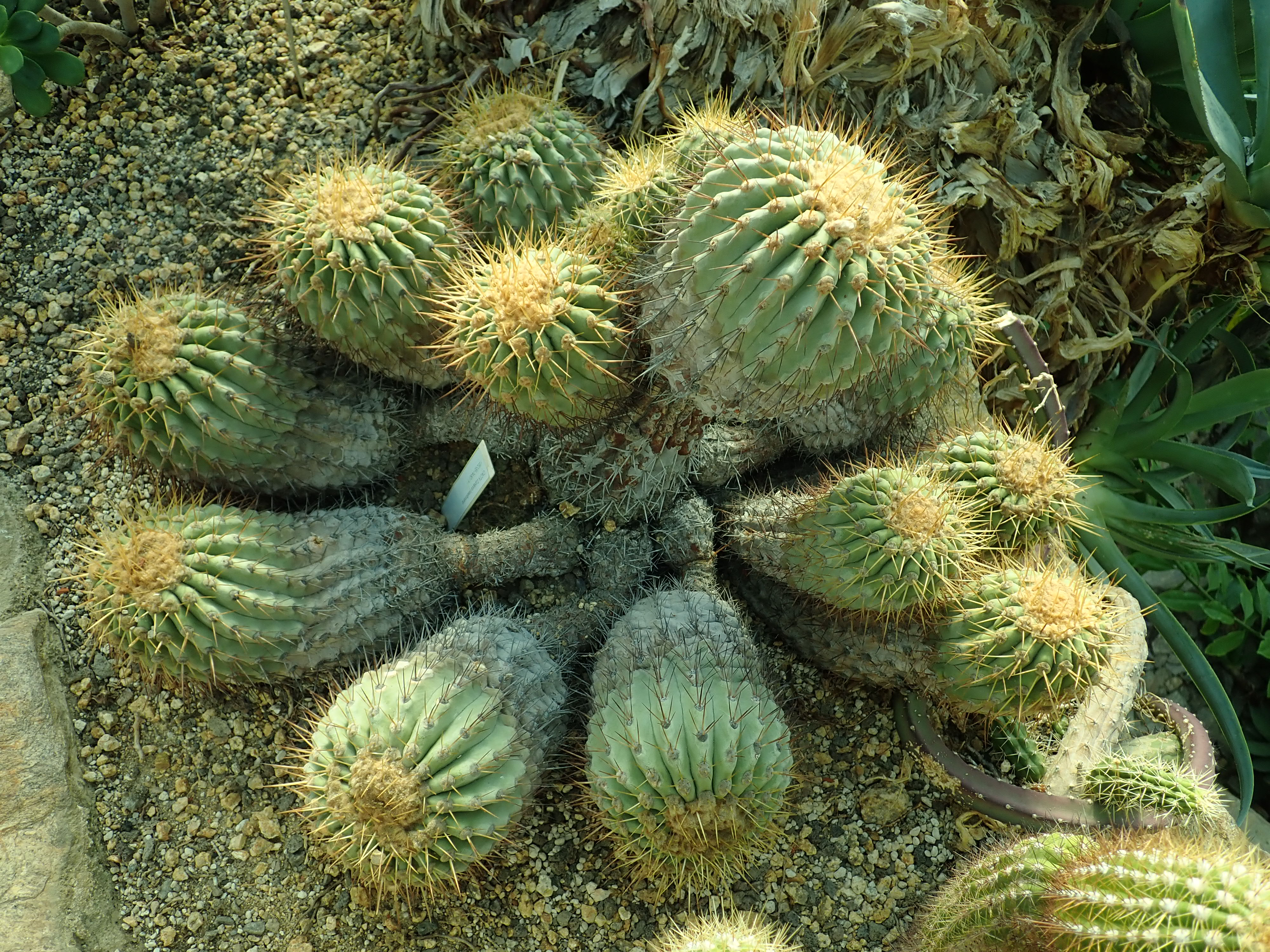

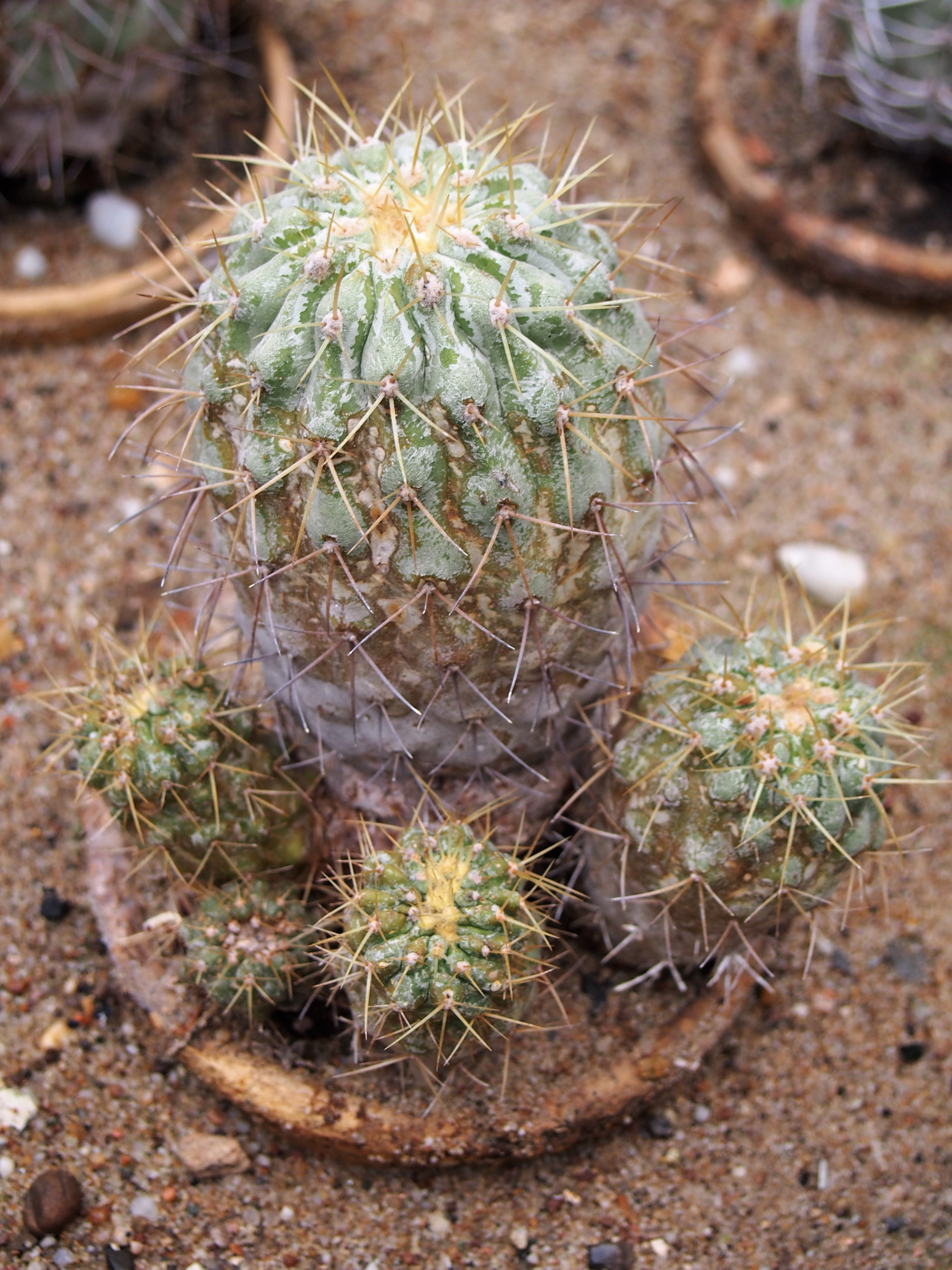

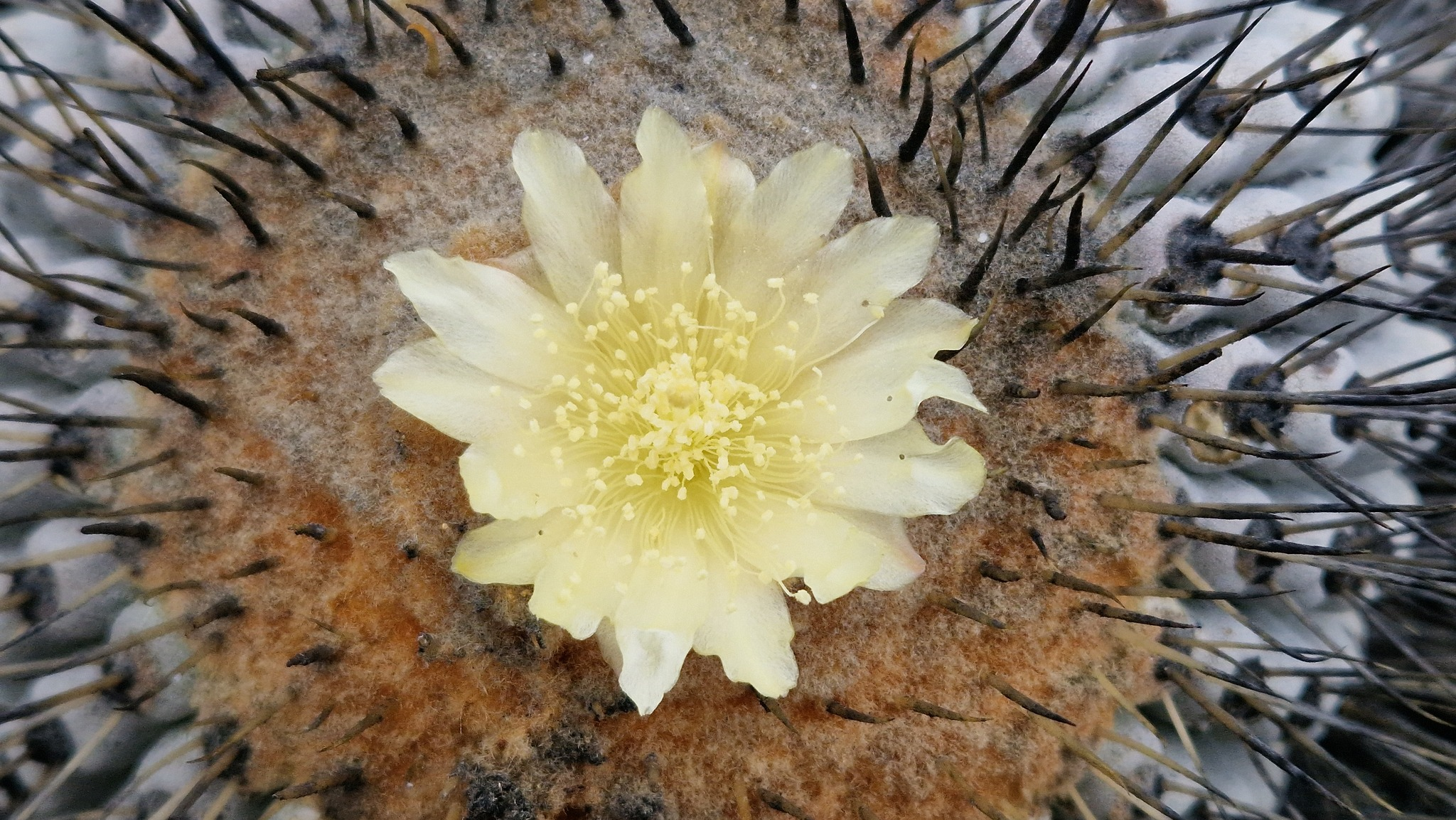
Flower

== Distribution ==
Copiapoa gigantea is found in Chile in the Antofagasta region near, the coast of Paposo.

== Taxonomy ==
The first description was in 1936 by Curt Backeberg. Nomenclatural synonyms are Copiapoa cinerea var. gigantea (Backeb.) N.P.Taylor (1987) and Copiapoa cinerea subsp. gigantea (Backeb.) Slaba (1997).
