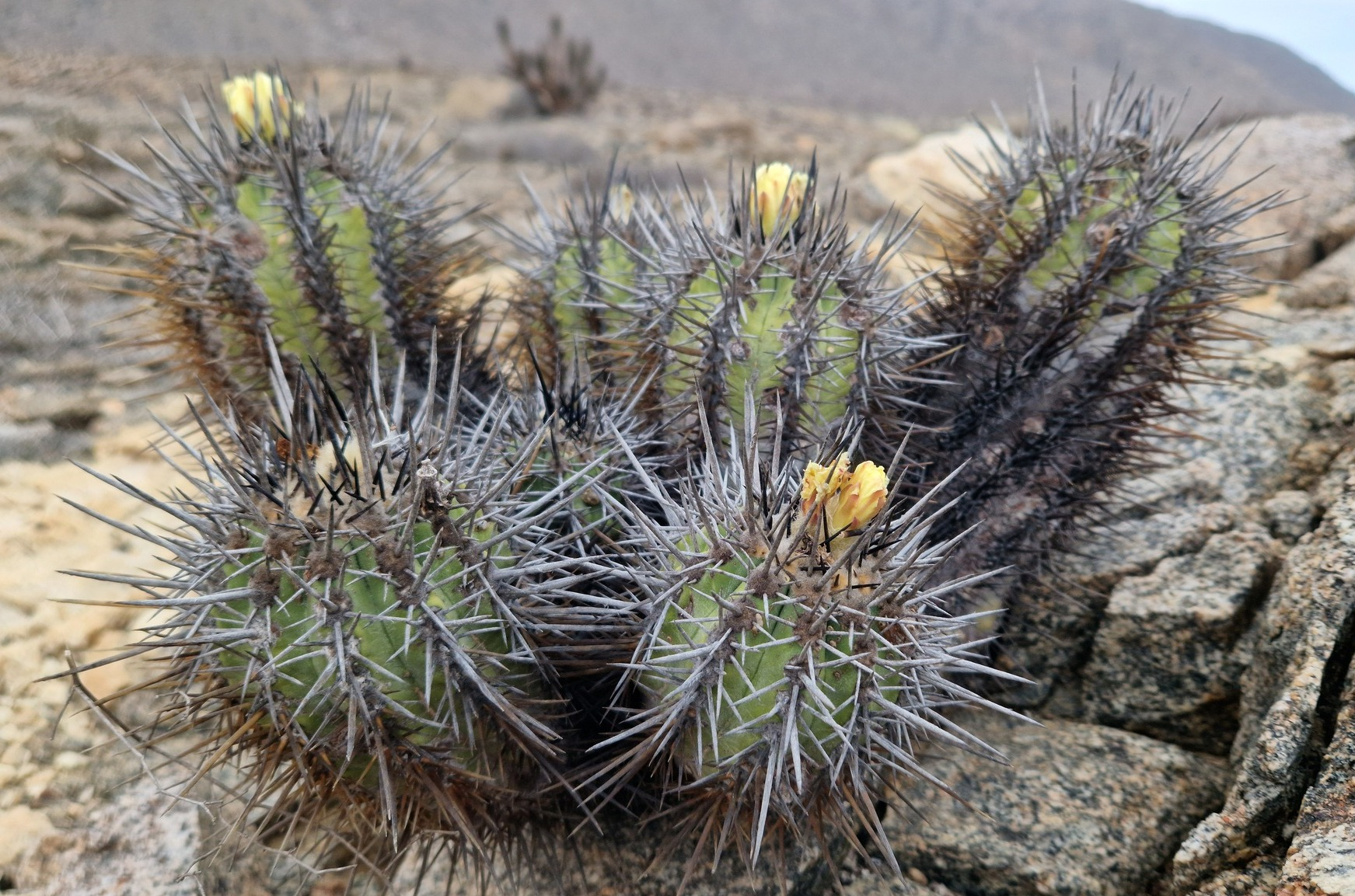

Scientific classification
- Kingdom: Plantae
- Clade: Tracheophytes
- Clade: Angiosperms
- Clade: Eudicots
- Order: Caryophyllales
- Family: Cactaceae
- Subfamily: Cactoideae
- Genus: Copiapoa
- Species: C. marginata

Binomial name
- Copiapoa marginata Britton & Rose

= Copiapoa marginata =

Species of plant

Copiapoa marginata is a species of clump-forming cactus of South America.

It is native to the Atacama Desert in northern Chile.

== Description ==
Copiapoa marginata grows to a height of up to 60 cm (24 in).

The plant bears 2–5 cm (0.79–1.97 in) long yellow flowers in spring and summer.

=== Subspecies and varieties ===
- Copiapoa marginata var. bridgesii
- Copiapoa marginata subsp. robustispina.
