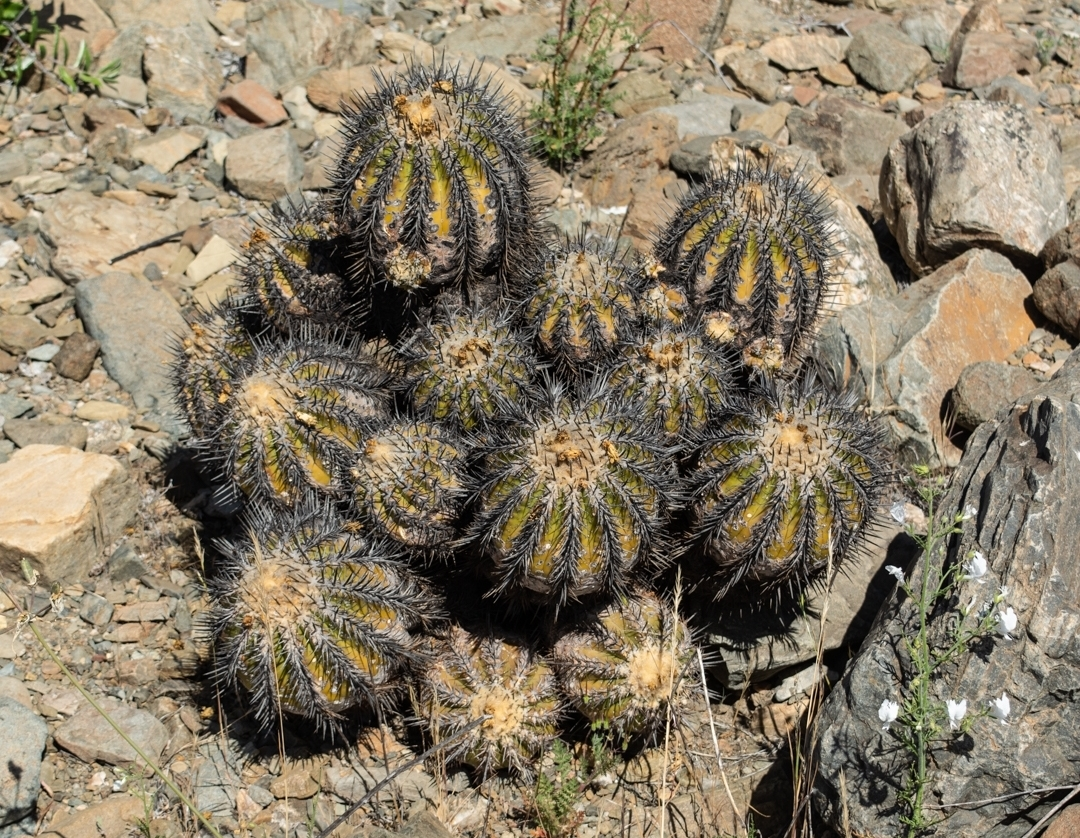

Scientific classification
- Kingdom: Plantae
- Clade: Tracheophytes
- Clade: Angiosperms
- Clade: Eudicots
- Order: Caryophyllales
- Family: Cactaceae
- Subfamily: Cactoideae
- Genus: Copiapoa
- Species: C. echinoides

Binomial name
- Copiapoa echinoides Britton & Rose

Synonyms
- Copiapoa cuprea Copiapoa cupreata Copiapoa dura Echinocactus cupreatus Echinocactus echinoides

= Copiapoa echinoides =

Species of plant

Copiapoa echinoides is a species of cactus in South America.

The species is native to the Atacama Desert in northern Chile.

== Description ==
Copiapoa echinoides grows to a height of up to 15 cm (6 in). The stem is ribbed and has a flattened spherical shape with 3 cm (1.2 in) long spines.

The plant bears 4 cm (1.6 in) long pale-yellow flowers in summer.
