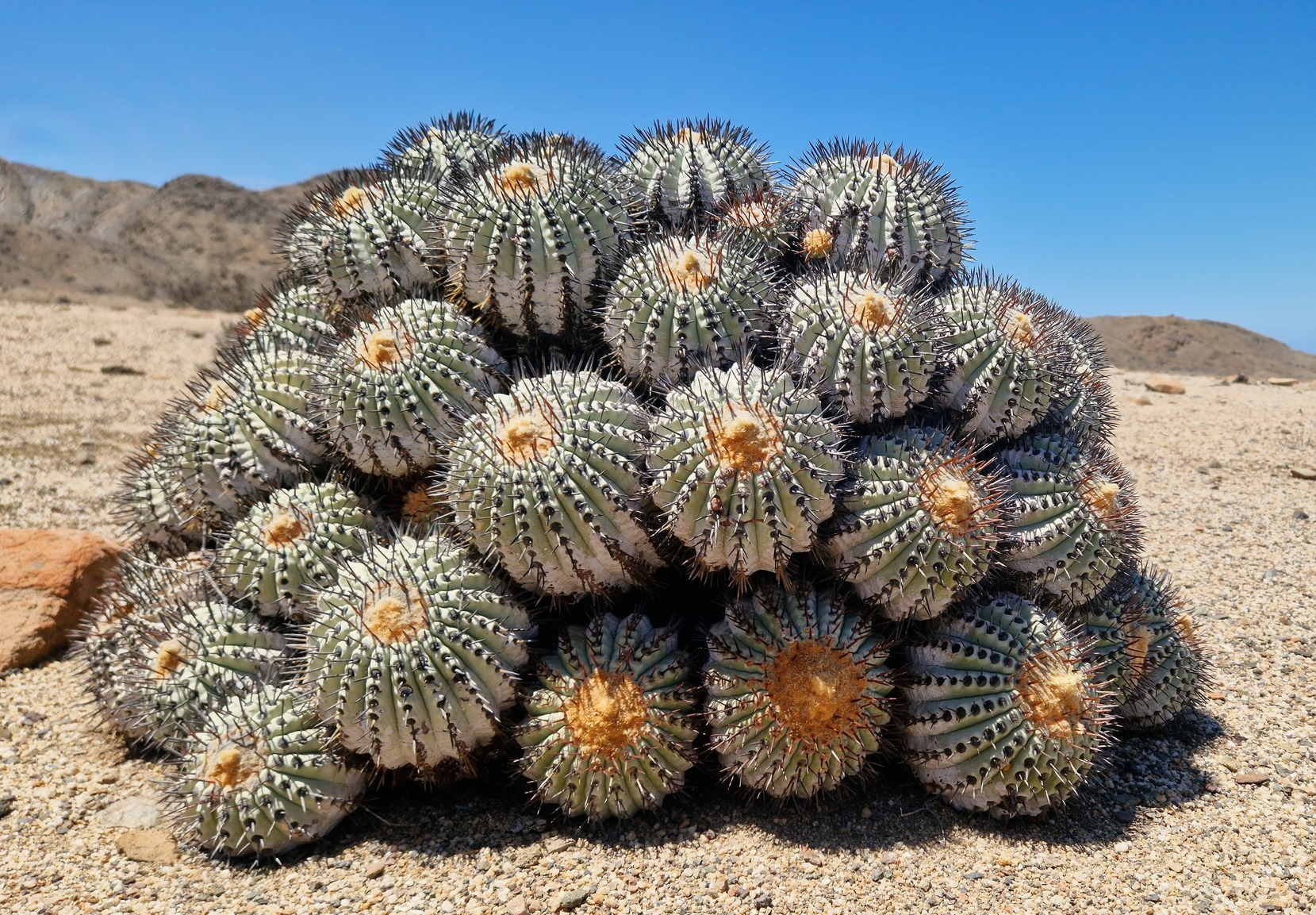
- Copiapoa longistaminea

Scientific classification
- Kingdom: Plantae
- Clade: Tracheophytes
- Clade: Angiosperms
- Clade: Eudicots
- Order: Caryophyllales
- Family: Cactaceae
- Subfamily: Cactoideae
- Tribe: Notocacteae
- Genus: Copiapoa; Britton & Rose

Type species
- Copiapoa marginata

= Copiapoa =

Genus of plant

Copiapoa is a genus of flowering plants in the cactus family Cactaceae, from the dry coastal deserts, particularly the Atacama Desert, of northern Chile.

== Description ==
Copiapoa comprises 32 morphologically defined species and five heterotypic subspecies. The species in this genus form dense cushions of hundreds of large, individual plants or produce only solitary plants. The shoots are spherical or elongated cylindrical. The spines, which are usually present, are variably shaped. On the apex, the species are usually densely woolly-haired. The ribs are clearly developed. These species vary in form from spherical to slightly columnar and in color from a brownish to blue-green bodies. They have warty ribs and spiny areoles, and they usually produce tubular yellow flowers, which grow from woolly crowns on the apex in summer. They are bell- to funnel-shaped and open during the day. The short, circular pericarp is glabrous. The flower tube is short and broad. The small, smooth fruits contain large, shiny, black seeds.

== Taxonomy ==
Pilocopiapoa F.Ritter has been brought into synonymy with this genus. Some authorities also include here the genus Blossfeldia.

=== Species ===
As of September 2026, Plants of the World Online accepted the following species. In the list, they have been separated into sections.

Subgenus	Image	Scientific name	Distribution
Pilocopiapoa (F.Ritter) Doweld—Ritter		Copiapoa solaris (F.Ritter) F.Ritter	Chile (Antofagasta to NW. Atacama)
Pilocopiapoa (F.Ritter) Doweld—Ritter		Copiapoa australis (Hoxey) Helmut Walter & Larridon	Chile (Atacama)
Pilocopiapoa (F.Ritter) Doweld—Ritter		Copiapoa laui Diers	Chile (Antofagasta to NW. Atacama)
Mammillopoa Helmut Walter & Larridon		Copiapoa humilis (Phil.) Hutchison	Chile (Antofagasta).
Copiapoa sect. Cinerei		Copiapoa ahremephiana N.P.Taylor & G.J.Charles	Chile (W. & SW. Antofagasta).
Copiapoa sect. Cinerei		Copiapoa gigantea Backeb.	Chile (Antofagasta to N. Atacama)
Copiapoa sect. Cinerei		Copiapoa cinerea (Phil.) Britton & Rose	Chile (Antofagasta to Atacama)
Copiapoa sect. Copiapoa		Copiapoa angustiflora Helmut Walter, G.J.Charles & Mächler	Chile (SW. Antofagasta)
Copiapoa sect. Copiapoa		Copiapoa aphanes Mächler & Helmut Walter	Chile (SW. Antofagasta)
Copiapoa sect. Copiapoa		Copiapoa atacamensis Middled.	Chile (Antofagasta to NW. Atacama)
Copiapoa sect. Copiapoa		Copiapoa calderana F.Ritter	Chile (Antofagasta to Atacama)
Copiapoa sect. Copiapoa		Copiapoa cinerascens (Salm-Dyck) Britton & Rose	Chile (SW. Antofagasta to NW. Atacama).
Copiapoa sect. Copiapoa		Copiapoa decorticans N.P.Taylor & G.J.Charles	Chile (Antofagasta to Atacama)
Copiapoa sect. Copiapoa		Copiapoa desertorum F.Ritter	Chile (Antofagasta to NW. Atacama)
Copiapoa sect. Copiapoa		Copiapoa esmeraldana F.Ritter	Chile (SW. Antofagasta to NW. Atacama)
Copiapoa sect. Copiapoa		Copiapoa grandiflora F.Ritter	Chile (SW. Antofagasta to NW. Atacama).
Copiapoa sect. Copiapoa		Copiapoa hypogaea F.Ritter	Chile (SW. Antofagasta to NW. Atacama).
Copiapoa sect. Copiapoa		Copiapoa leonensis I.Schaub & Keim	Chile (Atacama).
Copiapoa sect. Copiapoa		Copiapoa longispina F.Ritter	Chile (Atacama)
Copiapoa sect. Copiapoa		Copiapoa longistaminea F.Ritter	Chile.
Copiapoa sect. Copiapoa		Copiapoa marginata (Salm-Dyck) Britton & Rose	Chile (SW. Atacama to NW. Coquimbo)
Copiapoa sect. Copiapoa		Copiapoa megarhiza Britton & Rose	Chile (Atacama).
Copiapoa sect. Copiapoa		Copiapoa mollicula F.Ritter	Chile (Atacama to NW. Coquimbo).
Copiapoa sect. Copiapoa		Copiapoa montana F.Ritter	Chile (SW. Antofagasta)
Copiapoa sect. Copiapoa		Copiapoa rupestris F.Ritter	Chile (Antofagasta).
Copiapoa sect. Copiapoa		Copiapoa saxifraga Blando & Pumarino	Chile (Atacama)
Copiapoa sect. Copiapoa		Copiapoa serpentisulcata F.Ritter	Chile (SW. Antofaga to NW. Atacama).
Copiapoa sect. Copiapoa		Copiapoa taltalensis (Werderm.) Looser	Chile (SW. Antofagasta).
Echinopoa Doweld		Copiapoa algarrobensis Katt.	Chile (Atacama)
Echinopoa Doweld		Copiapoa armata (F.Ritter) Helmut Walter & Larridon	Chile (N Coquimbo)
Echinopoa Doweld		Copiapoa coquimbana (Karw. ex Rümpler) Britton & Rose	Chile (SW. Antofagasta to Coquimbo)
Echinopoa Doweld		Copiapoa corralensis I.Schaub & Keim	Chile (Atacama)
Echinopoa Doweld		Copiapoa echinoides (Lem. ex Salm-Dyck) Britton & Rose	Chile (Atacama to NW. Coquimbo).
Echinopoa Doweld		Copiapoa fiedleriana (K.Schum.) Backeb.	Chile (SW. Antofagasta to NW. Coquimbo)
Echinopoa Doweld		Copiapoa fusca I.Schaub & Keim	Chile (Atacama).
Echinopoa Doweld		Copiapoa malletiana (Cels ex Salm-Dyck) Backeb.	Chile (Atacama)
Echinopoa Doweld		Copiapoa pendulina F.Ritter	Chile (Coquimbo)
Echinopoa Doweld		Copiapoa schulziana I.Schaub & Keim	Chile (Atacama).
Incertae Sedis		Copiapoa hoffmanniana Blando & Pumarino	Chile (Atacama)

== See also ==
- Copiapó (the largest city of the Atacama region)
- Pan de Azúcar National Park
