= Fernando da Costa Leal =

Portuguese army officer, writer, poet and botanist

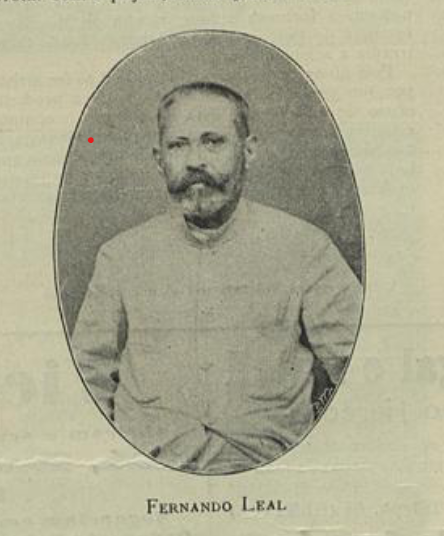
- Born: 15 October 1846; Margão, Portuguese India
- Died: 4 April 1910 (aged 63); Goa, Portuguese India
- Occupations: Army officer, writer, poet and botanist

Fernando da Costa Leal (15 October 1846 – 4 April 1910) was a Portuguese army officer, writer, poet and botanist.

== Biography ==
Costa Leal was born in Margão, Portuguese India.

He joined the Artillery Regiment of Goa on 27 April 1862 and then registered for an artillery course at the Escola Militar (Military School) of Nova Goa. In 1868 he volunteered to join an expedition against the Bonga of Zambésia in Mozambique and was promoted to second lieutenant. After which he was transferred to the garrison in Angola and there appointed as aide-de-camp to the Governor-General of Mozambique. His uncle, Fernando da Costa Leal (1825–1869), was appointed shortly after as Governor-General of Mozambique so that the two Fernandos travelled together to Island of Mozambique.

On 26 June 1869 the young Fernando da Costa Leal was appointed by his uncle to secretary of the Diplomatic Commission under the chairmanship of Carlos Pedro Barahona e Costa (1833–1876), to go to the ZAR to determine borders and negotiate trade agreements. The Commission sailed to Durban, travelled through the Orange Free State and arrived in Potchefstroom on 7 December 1869. From here they visited places such as Pretoria and Rustenburg. On 17 May 1870 da Costa Leal resigned this post and accompanied German naturalist and explorer, Carl Mauch (1837–1875), on a journey from Potchefstroom to Lourenço Marques to explore potential routes between the ZAR and Delagoa Bay. It was on this trip that Leal compiled a report of his impressions of his stay in the ZAR and the journey from Potchefstroom via Pretoria, Botšhabelo, New Scotland, the southern part of Swaziland, the Lebombo Mountains and Catembe to Lourenço Marques (lasting from 18 May to 8 August 1870). In 1871 da Costa Leal was placed in charge of construction of the planned route between Mozambique and the ZAR up to the Lebombo Mountains. Towards the end of April 1871 the Portuguese reported that the surveys had been completed and that construction of the road had begun.

Shortly after Costa Leal left Mozambique for Lisbon, where in 1874 he was transferred to the Royal army. Since the Portuguese authorities would not accede to what were regarded as excessive demands, a rebellion broke out amongst the soldiers in Goa. Reinforcements were hurriedly dispatched from Portugal to quell the uprising, Costa Leal being amongst the forces. Here he was rapidly promoted - on 20 April 1881 to lieutenant, on 17 March 1886 to captain and on 13 August 1891 to major. On 20 April 1892 he was appointed Administrator of State Property at Assolna, the same office that his father, Sebastião Augusto da Costa Leal, had held from 1855 to 1883. Fernando da Costa Leal was married to the daughter of Dom José de Noronha, Count of Maem.

He died at Goa.

== Literary work ==
As administrator he displayed great sympathy to Indian culture. He was liberal in his attitude and a proponent of reform. Costa Leal spent the final years of his life in Panjim and died there on 4 April 1910 and was buried there. Costa Leal was a well-known poet, author and translator. His literary works include amongst others:

- Elephantes e monstros, episódio da insurreição indiana de 1857, por Méry versão e notas por um Índio (Elephants and monsters - an episode from the Indian Mutiny of 1857) – Lisbon, 1876
- Lettre á mademoiselle Marie Denis sur l’immortalité parisienne (A letter to mademoiselle Marie Denis regarding Parisian immortality) – Lisbon, 1877; published in French under the pseudonym Rouget de la Presqu’ile
- En Reflexos e penumbras (On Reflections and Penumbrae) – Lisbon, 1879; a volume of verse including original poems as well as excellent translations of Victor Hugo (1802–1885).

Costa Leal also wrote works with historic and cultural backgrounds. Besides his report on the trip from ZAR to Lourenço Marques in 1870, he also wrote about his life in Goa, namely Relatório ácèrca da Administração Geral dos Campos Nacionaes de Assolnã, Velim, Ambelim, Talvordá, Nuém e Ragibaga Relativo a 1897 (Nova Goa, 1898), one of very few sources providing details of the Portuguese administration and life in Goa from that period.

== Poetic works ==
- Reflexos e Penumbras (1879)
- Relâmpagos (1888)

== Other works ==
- Palmadas na Pança de John Bull (1884)
- "Relatorio acerca da Administracao Geral dos Campos Nacionaes de Assolna, Velim, Ambelim, Talvorda, Nuem e Ragibaga relativo a 1897"
- Relatorio da viagem feita do interior da Republica do Transvaal para o porto de Lourenco Marques by "Fernando da Costa Leal, Alferes e secretario da Comissao Diplomatica ao Transvaal, em 1870"

== Legacy ==
Several places or species were named after Costa Leal, including the Bottle tree species Pachypodium lealii Welw. (Hogan. 2010)

== Sources ==
- Anthropologist R. Newman
- C.Michael Hogan ed. 2010. Pachypodium lealii. Encyclopedia of Life
- 19th Century Portuguese Travellers in the Transvaal - O.J.O. Ferreira
- O.J.O. Ferreira,Da Costa Leal in die Zuid-Afrikaanse Republiek. Pretoria: Protea Boekhuis, 2008.
