= Pan de Azúcar National Park =

National park in Chile

- IUCN category II (national park)
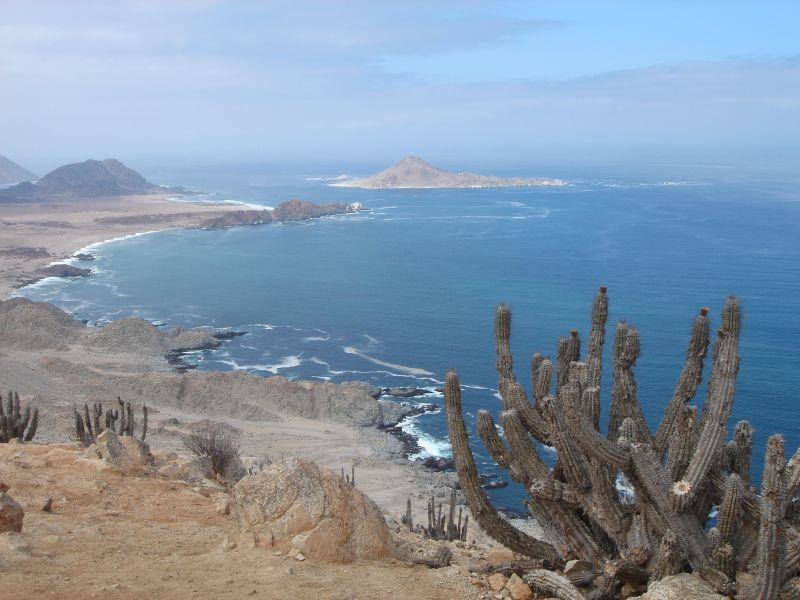

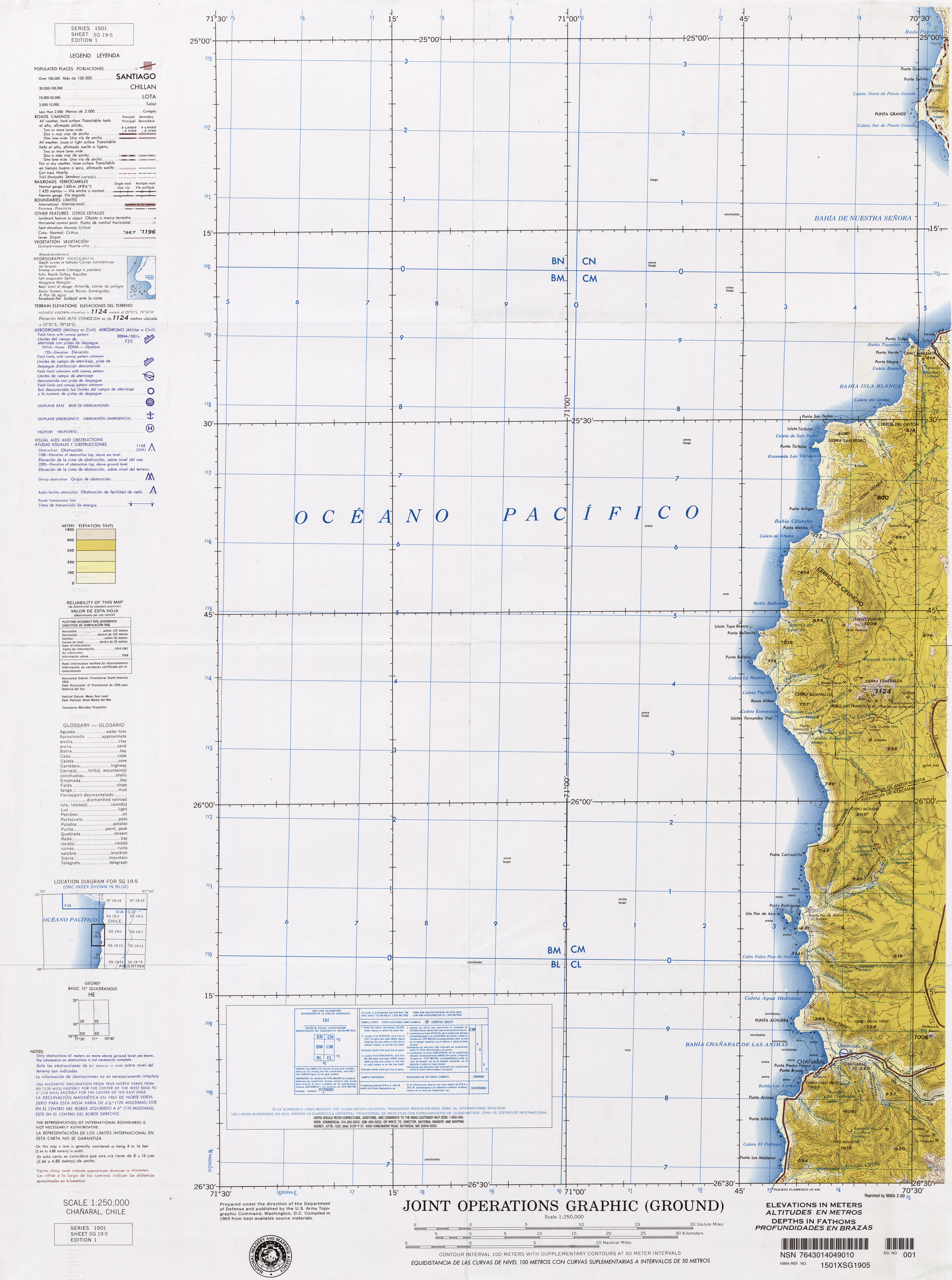
- Pan de Azúcar Region
- Location: Antofagasta Region-Atacama Region, Chile
- Nearest city: Chañaral
- Coordinates: 26°08′59″S 70°39′02″W
- Area: 438 km^{2} (169 sq mi)
- Established: 1985
- Governing body: Corporación Nacional Forestal

Pan de Azúcar National Park is a national park of Chile. The park straddles the border between the Antofagasta Region and the Atacama Region. Its name, Parque Nacional Pan de Azúcar, means "sugar loaf national park".

== Geography ==
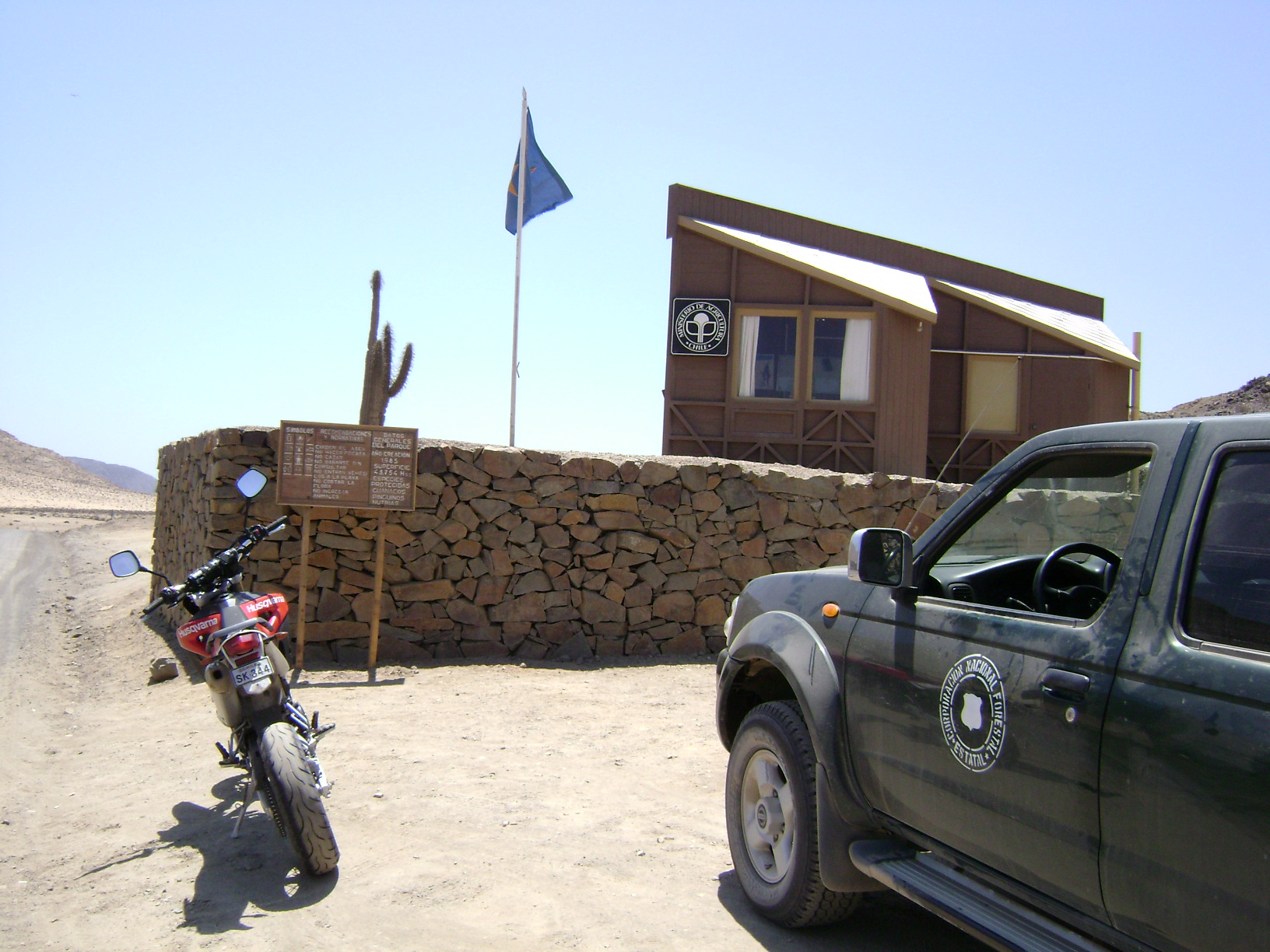
Entrance to the park

The park is located 30 km north of Chañaral and 180 km north of Copiapó. It was founded in 1985 and has an extension of 437.54 km² (including 1.1 km² of insular terrain). It is importance derives from the relative diversity of species.

=== Isla Pan de Azúcar ===
Isla Pan de Azúcar is located 24 km farther. Humboldt penguins breed on this island. The island can be reached by boat from the mainland but passengers are not allowed to leave the boat.

=== Caleta Pan de Azúcar ===
Caleta Pan de Azúcar (Pan de Azúcar Cove) is a small fishing settlement which now caters to tourism. Formerly, copper was worked here and freighted by boat. Divers can still explore parts of the wharf and the loading crane below the water. From here the look-out point of Mirador 8 km farther can be reached. On the mountain slopes nearby, fauna can be observed which stay alive thanks to the coastal mist.

=== North of Caleta Pan de Azúcar ===
From the cove northward there is a gravel road which connects to the Pan-American Highway. Along the way there are numerous geological formations.

== Biology ==
Pan de Azúcar NP is divided into two ecosystems: the coastal desert of Taltal and the steppe desert of the Sierra Vicuña Mackenna. The absence of rain is compensated by coastal mist, which is known locally as Camanchaca.

There are more than 20 cactus species in the area, mainly of the genus Copiapoa which also can be observed in the cactarium located in the environmental office of CONAF in front of Los Piqueros Beach 4.96 miles from the park entrance. It is open for visits from Monday to Sunday from 8:30 to 12:30 and from 14:00 to 18:00.

The guanaco is the main mammal found in the park. Other mammals include culpeo fox, chilla fox and European hare. The shoreline area is home to marine mammals, such as the marine otter and the South American sea lion. Among the birds are the Humboldt penguin and Peruvian pelican. Also reptile species of the genera Tropidurus and Callopistes inhabit the park.

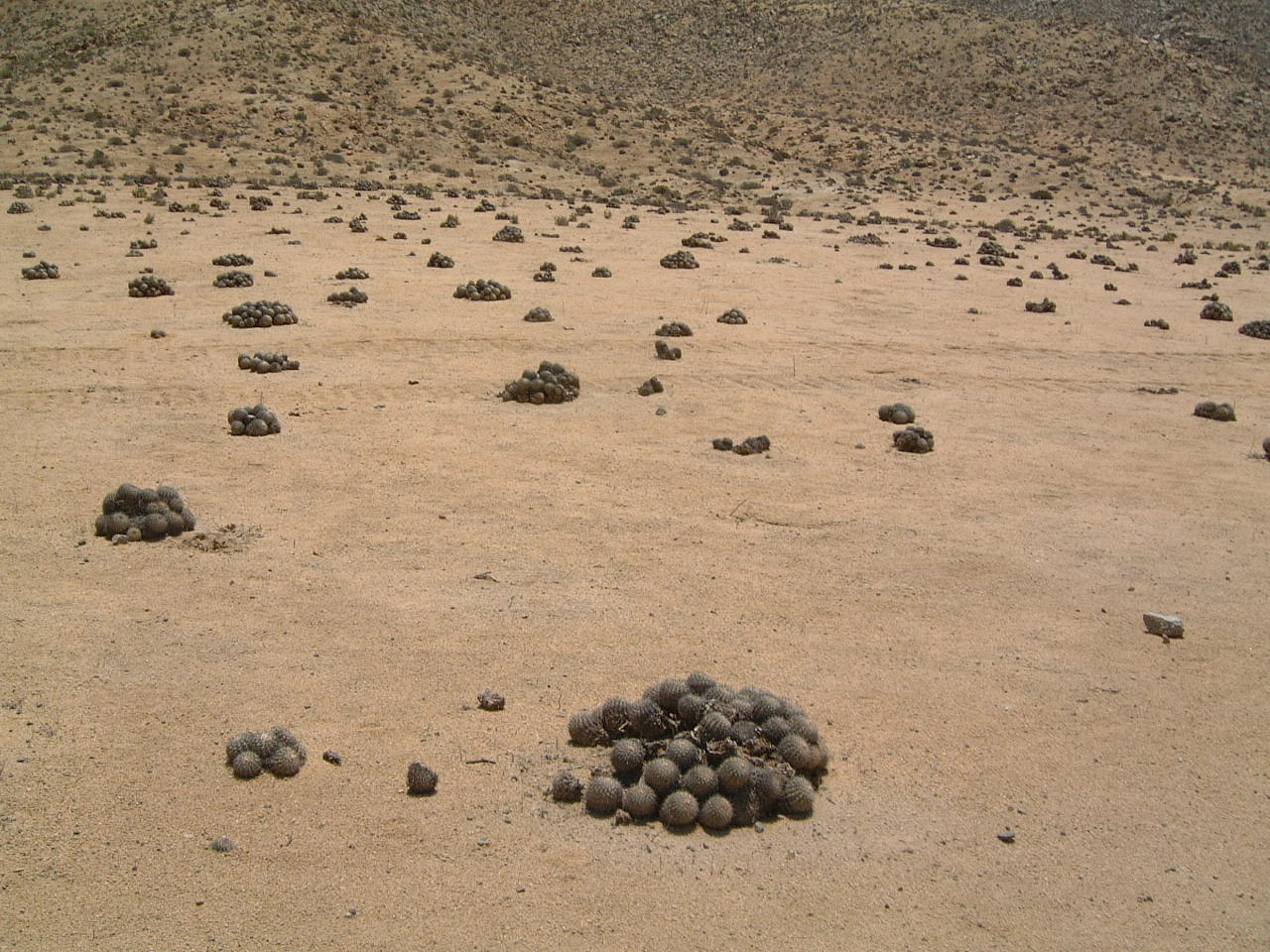
Cacti in the park

Riding through the Valley

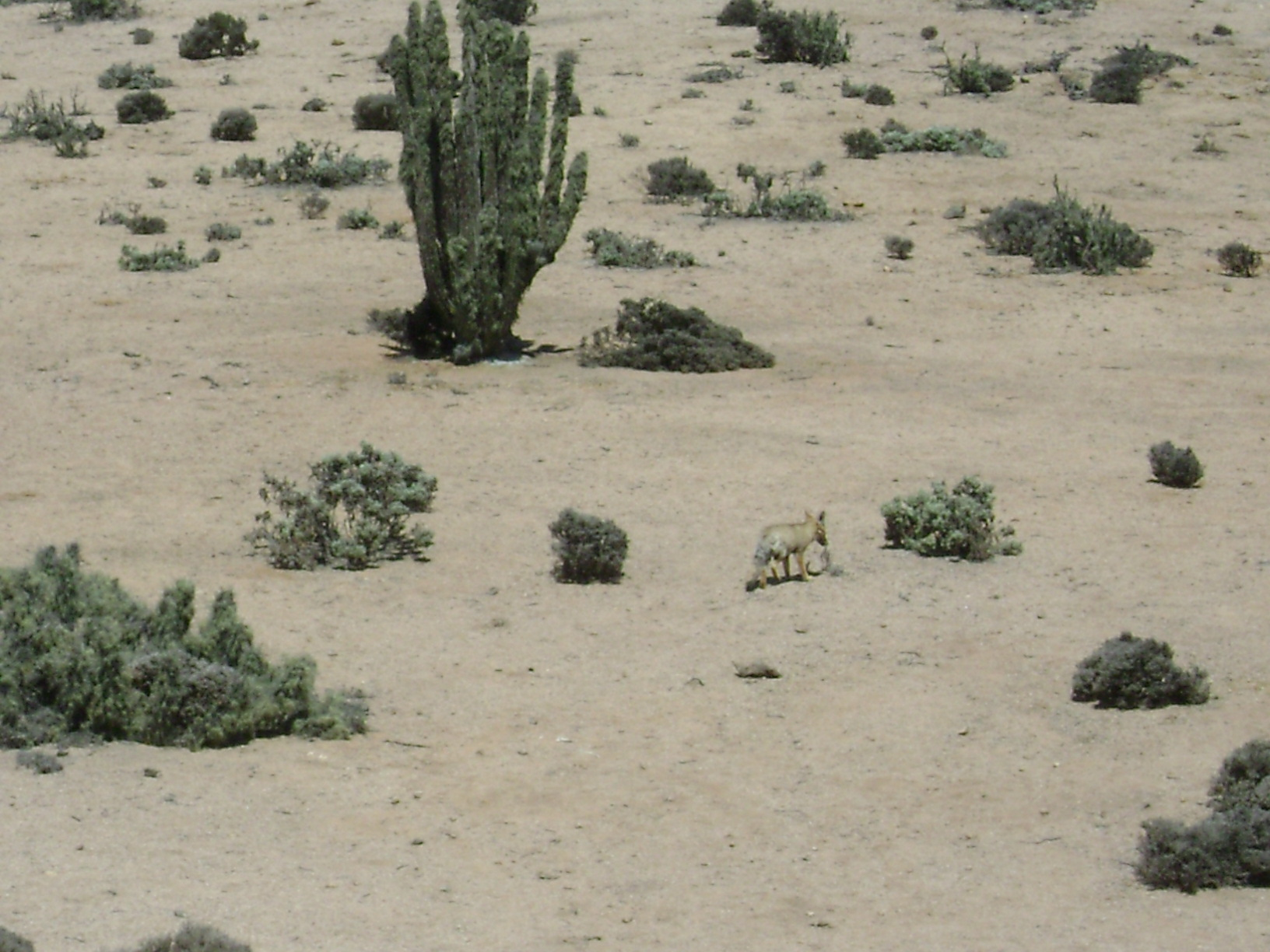
Picture of a chilla fox in the park

== See also ==
- Atacama Desert
