= List of Eugenia species =

Eugenia is a large, broadly distributed genus of flowering trees, shrubs, and subshrubs in the myrtle family, Myrtaceae. As of November 2019, there are 1,224 accepted species by Plants of the World Online.

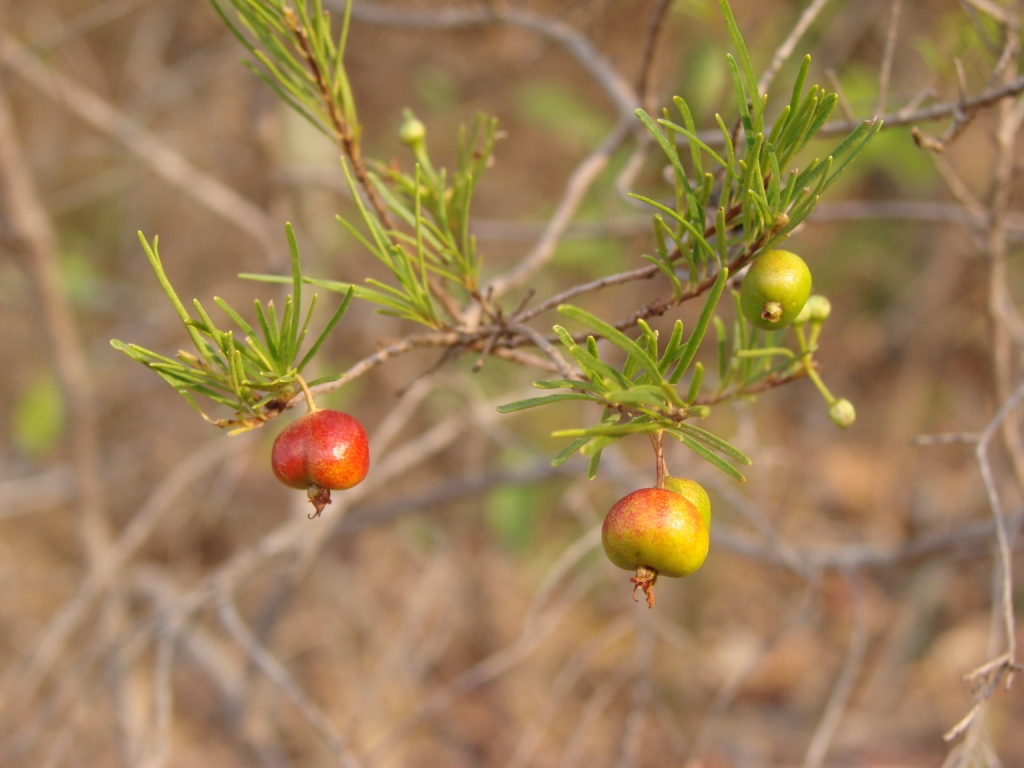
Eugenia angustissima

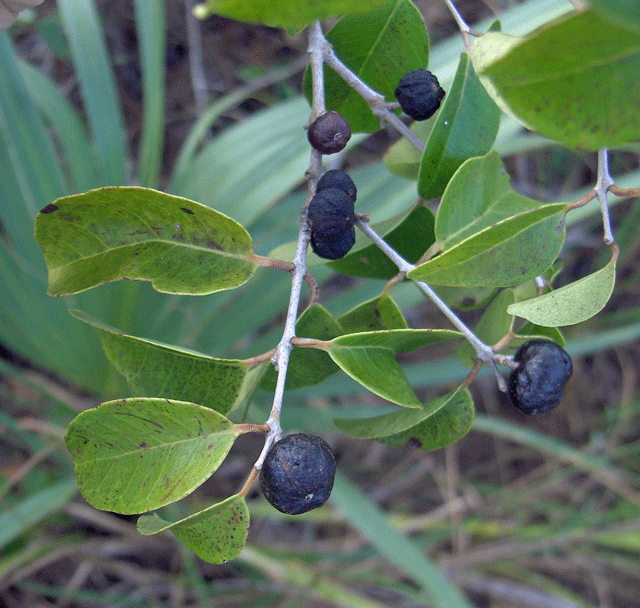
Eugenia axillaris

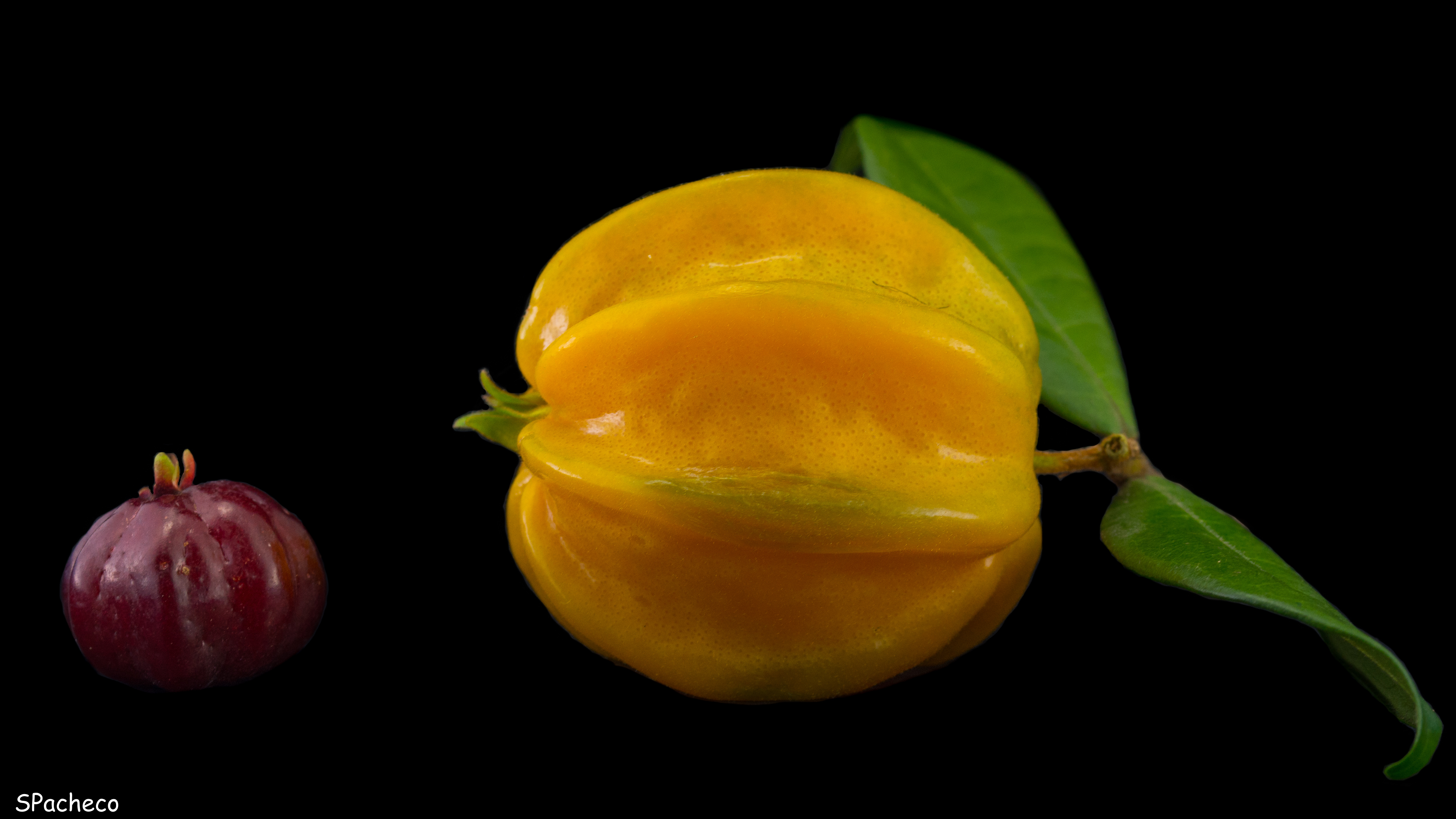
Fruits of Eugenia uniflora (left) and Eugenia selloi

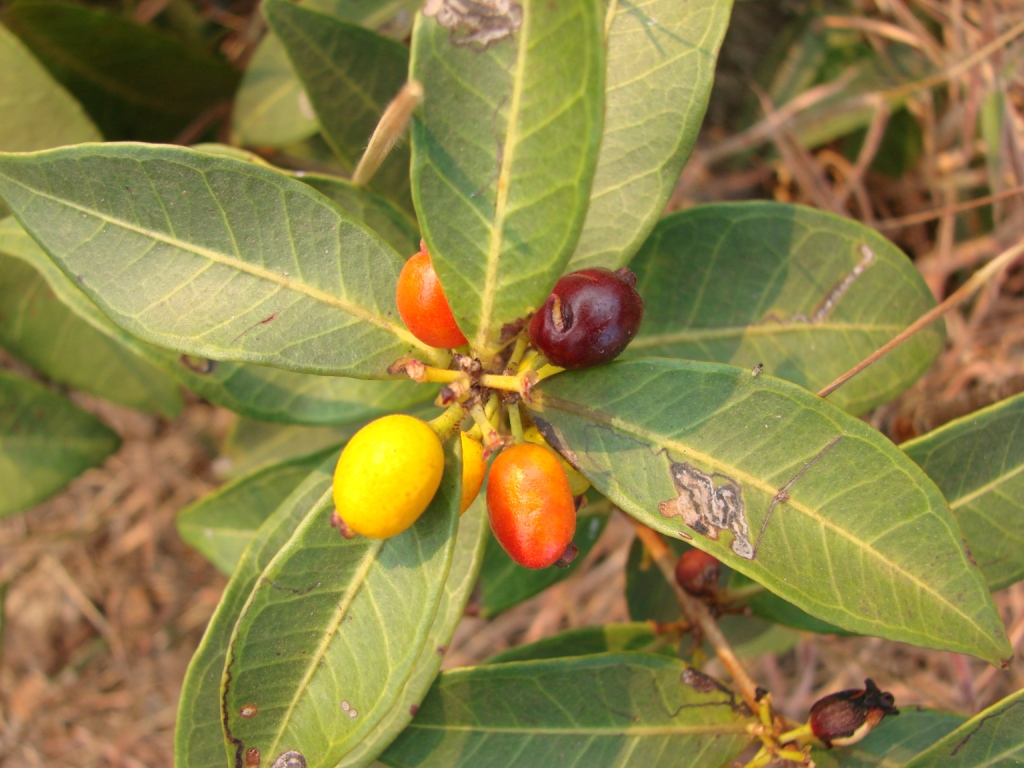
Eugenia calycina

== A ==
- Eugenia abbreviata Urb.
- Eugenia aboukirensis Proctor
- Eugenia abunan M.A.D.Souza & Sobral
- Eugenia acapulcensis Steud.
- Eugenia aceitillo Urb.
- Eugenia acrantha Urb.
- Eugenia acrensis McVaugh
- Eugenia acrisepala Govaerts
- Eugenia acunae Alain
- Eugenia acutata Miq.
- Eugenia acutissima Urb. & Ekman
- Eugenia adenantha O.Berg
- Eugenia adenocarpa O.Berg
- Eugenia aequatoriensis M.L.Kawas. & B.Holst
- Eugenia aerosa McVaugh
- Eugenia aeruginea DC.
- Eugenia aeterna Mazine & Valdemarin
- Eugenia afzelii Engl.
- Eugenia agasthiyamalayana Gopalan & Murugan
- Eugenia agathopoda Diels
- Eugenia aherniana C.B.Rob.
- Eugenia alagoensis (O.Berg) Mattos
- Eugenia alainii Borhidi
- Eugenia alaotrensis H.Perrier
- Eugenia albicans (O.Berg) Urb.
- Eugenia albida Bonpl.
- Eugenia albimarginata Urb. & Ekman
- Eugenia alletiana Baider & V.Florens
- Eugenia alnifolia McVaugh
- Eugenia aloysii C.J.Saldanha
- Eugenia alpina (Sw.) Willd.
- Eugenia altissima Sobral & Faria
- Eugenia altoalegre Sobral & M.A.D.Souza
- Eugenia amatenangensis Lundell
- Eugenia ambanizanensis N.Snow
- Eugenia amblyophylla Urb.
- Eugenia amblyosepala McVaugh
- Eugenia amoena Thwaites
- Eugenia amorimii Fraga & Giaretta
- Eugenia amosensis N.Snow
- Eugenia ampla M.L.Kawas. & B.Holst
- Eugenia amplifolia Urb.
- Eugenia amshoffiae McVaugh
- Eugenia anafensis Urb.
- Eugenia analamerensis H.Perrier
- Eugenia anamalaiensis E.S.S.Kumar, Veldkamp & Shareef
- Eugenia anastomosans DC.
- Eugenia ancorifera Amshoff
- Eugenia andapae N.Snow
- Eugenia andiraana M.A.D.Souza & Sobral
- Eugenia angelyana Mattos
- Eugenia angustissima O.Berg
- Eugenia anisomischa Sobral & K.Cout.
- Eugenia ankarensis (H.Perrier) A.J.Scott
- Eugenia anomala D.Legrand
- Eugenia anthacanthoides Urb. & Ekman
- Eugenia anthropophaga Costa-Lima & E.C.O.Chagas
- Eugenia antilahimenae N.Snow, Callm. & Byng
- Eugenia antongilensis H.Perrier
- Eugenia arawakorum Sandwith
- Eugenia arayan Seem.
- Eugenia ardisioides Lundell
- Eugenia ardyceae N.Snow
- Eugenia arenaria Cambess.
- Eugenia arenicola H.Perrier
- Eugenia arenosa Mattos
- Eugenia argentea Bedd.
- Eugenia argyrophylla B.Holst & M.L.Kawas.
- Eugenia armeniaca Sagot
- Eugenia arrabidae O.Berg
- Eugenia arrhaphocalyx Barrie, I.Vergara & McPherson
- Eugenia arthroopoda Baill. ex Drake
- Eugenia arvensis Vell.
- Eugenia aschersoniana F.Hoffm.
- Eugenia asema Sobral, I.G.Costa & M.C.Souza
- Eugenia asperifolia O.Berg
- Eugenia astringens Cambess.
- Eugenia atlantica Valdemarin & Sobral
- Eugenia atricha Urb.
- Eugenia atroracemosa McVaugh
- Eugenia atrosquamata McVaugh
- Eugenia augustana Kiaersk.
- Eugenia aurata O.Berg
- Eugenia austin-smithii Standl.
- Eugenia avicenniae Standl.
- Eugenia axillaris (Sw.) Willd.
- Eugenia ayitiensis Flickinger
- Eugenia azeda Sobral
- Eugenia azurensis O.Berg

== B ==
- Eugenia bacopari D.Legrand
- Eugenia badia O.Berg
- Eugenia bahiana Mattos
- Eugenia bahiensis DC.
- Eugenia bahorucana Alain
- Eugenia baileyi Britton
- Eugenia bajaverapazana Lundell
- Eugenia balancanensis Lundell
- Eugenia balansae Guillaumin
- Eugenia banderensis Urb.
- Eugenia barbata McVaugh
- Eugenia barbosae Barb.Rodr.
- Eugenia barrana Sobral
- Eugenia barriei N.Snow
- Eugenia basilaris McVaugh
- Eugenia batavorum (McVaugh) Mattos
- Eugenia batingabranca Sobral
- Eugenia bayatensis Urb.
- Eugenia belemitana McVaugh
- Eugenia belepiana J.W.Dawson ex N.Snow
- Eugenia belladerensis Urb. & Ekman
- Eugenia belloi Barrie
- Eugenia bellonis Krug & Urb.
- Eugenia bemangidiensis N.Snow
- Eugenia bergii Nied.
- Eugenia beruttii (Mattos) Mattos
- Eugenia biflora (L.) DC.
- Eugenia bimarginata DC.
- Eugenia binata Mazine & Sobral
- Eugenia bissei Flickinger
- Eugenia blanchetiana O.Berg
- Eugenia blanda Sobral
- Eugenia blastantha (O.Berg) D.Legrand
- Eugenia bojeri Baker
- Eugenia bolampattiana V.Ravich., Murug. & Murugan
- Eugenia boliviana (D.Legrand) Mattos
- Eugenia boqueronensis Britton
- Eugenia borhidiana Z.Acosta
- Eugenia borinquensis Britton
- Eugenia bosseri J.Guého & A.J.Scott
- Eugenia botequimensis Kiaersk.
- Eugenia brachyblastiflora Barrie, C.A.Ramos & O.Ortiz
- Eugenia brachyclada Urb. & Ekman
- Eugenia brachysepala Kiaersk.
- Eugenia bragae T.Fern. & Faria
- Eugenia brasiliana Aubl.
- Eugenia brasiliensis Lam.
- Eugenia breedlovei Barrie
- Eugenia brejoensis Mazine
- Eugenia breteleri Jongkind
- Eugenia breviacuminata M.A.D.Souza & Sobral
- Eugenia brevipedunculata Kiaersk.
- Eugenia brevipes A.Rich.
- Eugenia breviracemosa Mazine
- Eugenia brongniartiana Guillaumin
- Eugenia brownei Urb.
- Eugenia brownsbergii Amshoff
- Eugenia brunneopubescens Mazine
- Eugenia bryanii Kaneh.
- Eugenia buchholzii Engl.
- Eugenia buenaventurensis Parra-Os.
- Eugenia bukobensis Engl.
- Eugenia bullata Pancher ex Guillaumin
- Eugenia bullatifolia M.L.Kawas. & Á.J.Pérez
- Eugenia bumelioides Standl.
- Eugenia bunchosiifolia Nied.
- Eugenia burkartiana (D.Legrand) D.Legrand
- Eugenia burretii Flickinger
- Eugenia buxifolia Lam.
- Eugenia byssacea McVaugh

== C ==
- Eugenia caatingicola K.Cout. & M.Ibrahim
- Eugenia cachoeirensis O.Berg
- Eugenia cacuminum Standl. & Steyerm.
- Eugenia caducibracteata Mazine
- Eugenia caducipetala M.A.D.Souza & Scud.
- Eugenia cahosiana Urb. & Ekman
- Eugenia cajalbanica Borhidi & O.Muñiz
- Eugenia calcadensis Bedd.
- Eugenia calciscopulorum N.Snow
- Eugenia calimensis Parra-Os.
- Eugenia callichroma McVaugh
- Eugenia caloneura Sobral & Rigueira
- Eugenia calophylloides DC.
- Eugenia calumettae Urb. & Ekman
- Eugenia calva McVaugh
- Eugenia calycina Cambess.
- Eugenia canapuensis Urb.
- Eugenia candolleana DC.
- Eugenia cantuana Lundell
- Eugenia capensis (Eckl. & Zeyh.) Harv.
- Eugenia capillipes Borhidi
- Eugenia capitulifera O.Berg
- Eugenia capixaba Mazine
- Eugenia capparidifolia DC.
- Eugenia capuli (Schltdl. & Cham.) Hook. &
- Eugenia capulioides Lundell
- Eugenia cararensis Barrie & Q.Jiménez
- Eugenia cartagensis O.Berg
- Eugenia casearioides (Kunth) DC.
- Eugenia cassinoides Lam.
- Eugenia castaneiflora M.L.Kawas. & B.Holst
- Eugenia cataphyllea M.C.Souza & Sobral
- Eugenia catharinae O.Berg
- Eugenia catharinensis D.Legrand
- Eugenia catingiflora Griseb.
- Eugenia cayoana Lundell
- Eugenia ceibana Urb.
- Eugenia cerasiflora Miq.
- Eugenia cereja D.Legrand
- Eugenia cerrocacaoensis Barrie
- Eugenia cervina Standl. & Steyerm.
- Eugenia chacoensis (D.Legrand) Kausel
- Eugenia chacueyana Alain
- Eugenia chahalana Lundell
- Eugenia chartacea McVaugh
- Eugenia chavarriae Barrie
- Eugenia chepensis Standl.
- Eugenia chiapensis Lundell
- Eugenia chinajensis Standl. & Steyerm.
- Eugenia chiquitensis O.Berg
- Eugenia chlorocarpa O.Berg
- Eugenia chlorophylla O.Berg
- Eugenia choapamensis Standl.
- Eugenia choungiensis Byng & N.Snow
- Eugenia christii Urb.
- Eugenia chrootricha Urb. & Ekman
- Eugenia chrootrichoides Proctor
- Eugenia chrysobalanoides DC.
- Eugenia chrysophyllum Poir.
- Eugenia churutensis Cornejo
- Eugenia cincta Griseb.
- Eugenia cinerascens Gardner
- Eugenia citrifolia Poir.
- Eugenia citroides Lundell
- Eugenia clarendonensis Urb.
- Eugenia clarensis Britton & P.Wilson
- Eugenia cloiselii H.Perrier
- Eugenia coaetanea O.Berg
- Eugenia coccifera O.Berg
- Eugenia coccinea K.Cout. & M.Ibrahim
- Eugenia cocosensis Barrie
- Eugenia codyensis Munro ex Wight
- Eugenia coffeifolia DC.
- Eugenia coibensis Barrie
- Eugenia colipensis O.Berg
- Eugenia columbiensis O.Berg
- Eugenia commutata O.Berg
- Eugenia complicata O.Berg
- Eugenia concava B.Holst & M.L.Kawas.
- Eugenia conchalensis D.Legrand & Mattos
- Eugenia concolor Mattos
- Eugenia conduplicata B.Holst
- Eugenia confusa DC.
- Eugenia congolensis De Wild. & T.Durand
- Eugenia conjuncta Amshoff
- Eugenia consolatae Chiov.
- Eugenia constanzae Alain
- Eugenia convexinervia D.Legrand
- Eugenia copacabanensis Kiaersk.
- Eugenia corcovadensis Kiaersk.
- Eugenia cordata (Sw.) DC.
- Eugenia cordillerana Mattos
- Eugenia coronata Vahl ex DC.
- Eugenia corrientina Barb.Rodr.
- Eugenia corusca Barrie
- Eugenia costaricensis O.Berg
- Eugenia costatifructa Mazine
- Eugenia cotinifolia Jacq.
- Eugenia coursiana H.Perrier
- Eugenia cowanii McVaugh
- Eugenia cowellii Britton & P.Wilson
- Eugenia coyolensis Standl.
- Eugenia crassa Sobral
- Eugenia crassicaulis Proctor
- Eugenia crassimarginata M.L.Kawas. & B.Holst
- Eugenia crassipetala J.Guého & A.J.Scott
- Eugenia craveniana N.Snow & Peter G.Wilson
- Eugenia crenata Vell.
- Eugenia crenularis Lundell
- Eugenia crenulata (Sw.) Willd.
- Eugenia cribrata McVaugh
- Eugenia cricamolensis Standl.
- Eugenia cristaensis O.Berg
- Eugenia cristalensis Urb.
- Eugenia cristata C.Wright
- Eugenia crossopterygoides A.Chev.
- Eugenia crucicalyx McVaugh
- Eugenia crucigera Däniker
- Eugenia cuaoensis McVaugh
- Eugenia cucullata Amshoff
- Eugenia culicina Sobral
- Eugenia culminicola McVaugh
- Eugenia culta Sobral
- Eugenia cupulata Amshoff
- Eugenia cupuligera Urb.
- Eugenia curvipilosa McVaugh
- Eugenia curvivenia McVaugh
- Eugenia cuspidifolia DC.
- Eugenia cycloidea Urb.
- Eugenia cydoniifolia O.Berg
- Eugenia cymatodes O.Berg
- Eugenia cyphophloea Griseb.

== D ==
- Eugenia daaouiensis Guillaumin
- Eugenia daenikeri Guillaumin
- Eugenia darcyi Barrie
- Eugenia decussata (Vell.) Mattos
- Eugenia delicata T.Fern., M.C.Souza & J.M.A.Braga
- Eugenia delicatissima N.Snow, Callm. & Phillipson
- Eugenia delpechiana Urb. & Ekman
- Eugenia demeusei De Wild.
- Eugenia denigrata McVaugh
- Eugenia densiracemosa Mazine & Faria
- Eugenia dentata (O.Berg) Nied.
- Eugenia dewevrei De Wild. & T.Durand
- Eugenia dibrachiata McVaugh
- Eugenia dichasiata Giaretta
- Eugenia dichroma O.Berg
- Eugenia dictyophleba O.Berg
- Eugenia dictyophylla Urb.
- Eugenia diminutiflora Amshoff
- Eugenia dimorpha O.Berg
- Eugenia dinklagei Engl. & Brehmer
- Eugenia diospyroides H.Perrier
- Eugenia dipetala Sobral & L.Kollmann
- Eugenia diplocampta Diels
- Eugenia discifera Gamble
- Eugenia discolorans C.Wright
- Eugenia discors McVaugh
- Eugenia discreta McVaugh
- Eugenia disperma Vell.
- Eugenia disticha (Sw.) DC.
- Eugenia dittocrepis O.Berg
- Eugenia dodoana Engl. & Brehmer
- Eugenia dodonaeifolia Cambess.
- Eugenia domingensis O.Berg
- Eugenia donosoensis Barrie, C.A.Ramos & O.Ortiz
- Eugenia doubledayi Standl.
- Eugenia drummondii Byng & Christenh.
- Eugenia duarteana Cambess.
- Eugenia duchassaingiana O.Berg
- Eugenia dulcis O.Berg
- Eugenia dumosa (Vahl) DC.
- Eugenia duplicata Britton & P.Wilson ex Acev.-Rodr. & M.T.Strong
- Eugenia dusenii Engl.
- Eugenia dussii Krug & Urb.
- Eugenia dysenterica DC.

== E ==
- Eugenia earlei Britton & P.Wilson
- Eugenia earthiana P.E.Sánchez
- Eugenia echinulata N.Snow
- Eugenia egensis DC.
- Eugenia eggersii Kiaersk.
- Eugenia ehrenbergiana O.Berg
- Eugenia ekmanii (Urb.) Flickinger
- Eugenia eliasii Lundell
- Eugenia elliotii Engl. & Brehmer
- Eugenia ellipsoidea Kiaersk.
- Eugenia elliptica Lam.
- Eugenia elongata Nied.
- Eugenia emarginata (Kunth) DC.
- Eugenia enormis (McVaugh) Mattos
- Eugenia ependytes McVaugh
- Eugenia eperforata Urb.
- Eugenia eriantha Urb.
- Eugenia ericoides Guillaumin
- Eugenia erythrocarpa (Kunth) DC.
- Eugenia erythrophylla Strey
- Eugenia espinhacensis Bünger & Sobral
- Eugenia essequiboensis Sandwith
- Eugenia esteliensis Barrie
- Eugenia eurycheila O.Berg
- Eugenia exaltata A.Rich. ex O.Berg
- Eugenia excelsa O.Berg
- Eugenia excisa Urb.
- Eugenia excoriata O.Berg
- Eugenia expansa Spring ex Mart.

== F ==
- Eugenia fajardensis (Krug & Urb.) Urb.
- Eugenia farameoides A.Rich.
- Eugenia farinacea Barrie
- Eugenia farneyi Faria & Proença
- Eugenia fernandez-alonsoi Parra-Os.
- Eugenia fernandopoana Engl. & Brehmer
- Eugenia ferreiraeana O.Berg
- Eugenia ferruginosa Mattos
- Eugenia fissurata Mattos
- Eugenia flamingensis O.Berg
- Eugenia flavescens DC.
- Eugenia flavicarpa Valdemarin & Faria
- Eugenia flavoviridis Lundell
- Eugenia fleuryi A.Chev.
- Eugenia floccosa Bedd.
- Eugenia florida DC.
- Eugenia floscellus D.Legrand
- Eugenia fluminensis O.Berg
- Eugenia foetida Pers.
- Eugenia fortuita M.A.D.Souza & Sobral
- Eugenia francavilleana O.Berg
- Eugenia froesii McVaugh
- Eugenia fulva Thwaites
- Eugenia funchiana K.Cout. & M.Ibrahim
- Eugenia funkiana O.Berg
- Eugenia fusca O.Berg
- Eugenia fuscopunctata Kiaersk.

== G ==
- Eugenia gabonensis Amshoff
- Eugenia gacognei Montrouz.
- Eugenia galalonensis (C.Wright ex Griseb.) Krug & Urb.
- Eugenia galbaoensis Mattos
- Eugenia galeata Urb.
- Eugenia gandhii N.Snow
- Eugenia gastropogena Faria & Proença
- Eugenia gatopensis Guillaumin
- Eugenia gaudichaudiana O.Berg
- Eugenia gaumeri Standl.
- Eugenia gemmiflora O.Berg
- Eugenia geraensis (D.Legrand & Mattos) Mattos
- Eugenia gerdae Mazine
- Eugenia gibberosa Urb.
- Eugenia gigas Lundell
- Eugenia gilgii Engl. & Brehmer
- Eugenia glabra Alston
- Eugenia glabrata (Sw.) DC.
- Eugenia glabrescens Mazine
- Eugenia glandulosa Cambess.
- Eugenia glandulosopunctata P.E.Sánchez & Poveda
- Eugenia glomeruliflora Mazine
- Eugenia gloriae Parra-Os.
- Eugenia goavensis (Urb.) Flickinger
- Eugenia goiapabana Sobral & Mazine
- Eugenia gomesiana O.Berg
- Eugenia gomezii Barrie
- Eugenia gomonenensis (Guillaumin) J.W.Dawson & N.Snow
- Eugenia gonavensis Urb.
- Eugenia gongylocarpa M.L.Kawas. & B.Holst
- Eugenia goviala H.Perrier
- Eugenia gracilifolia Faria & T.Fern.
- Eugenia gracilipes Kiaersk.
- Eugenia gracilis O.Berg
- Eugenia gracillima Kiaersk.
- Eugenia grandiflora O.Berg
- Eugenia grandifolia O.Berg
- Eugenia grandissima Sobral, Mazine & E.A.D.Melo
- Eugenia grayumii Barrie
- Eugenia greggii (Sw.) Poir.
- Eugenia grifensis Urb.
- Eugenia grijalvae Barrie
- Eugenia grisebachii Krug & Urb.
- Eugenia griseiflora McVaugh
- Eugenia grisiana Guillaumin
- Eugenia grossa B.Holst & M.L.Kawas.
- Eugenia gryposperma Krug & Urb.
- Eugenia guajavoides N.Snow & Randriat.
- Eugenia guanabarina (Mattos & D.Legrand) Giaretta & M.C.Souza
- Eugenia guanensis Urb.
- Eugenia guatemalensis Donn.Sm.
- Eugenia guayaquilensis (Kunth) DC.
- Eugenia guillotii Hochr.
- Eugenia gyrosepala Baker f.

== H ==
- Eugenia haberi Barrie
- Eugenia haematocarpa Alain
- Eugenia haitiensis Krug & Urb.
- Eugenia hamiltonii (Mattos) Mattos
- Eugenia hammelii Barrie
- Eugenia handroana D.Legrand
- Eugenia handroi (Mattos) Mattos
- Eugenia hanoverensis Proctor
- Eugenia haputalense Kosterm.
- Eugenia harkerae Sánchez-Cháv. & Zamudio
- Eugenia harrisii Krug & Urb.
- Eugenia hartmanniae Mattos
- Eugenia hartshornii Barrie
- Eugenia hastilis (Blume) J.Guého & A.J.Scott
- Eugenia hatschbachii Mazine
- Eugenia hazompasika H.Perrier
- Eugenia hazonjia N.Snow
- Eugenia herbacea O.Berg
- Eugenia hermesiana Mattos
- Eugenia herrerae Barrie
- Eugenia heterochroa Urb.
- Eugenia heterochroma Diels
- Eugenia heterophylla A.Rich.
- Eugenia hexovulata McVaugh
- Eugenia hiemalis Cambess.
- Eugenia higueyana Alain
- Eugenia hilariana DC.
- Eugenia hiraeifolia Standl.
- Eugenia hirta O.Berg
- Eugenia hispidiflora Sobral & M.C.Souza
- Eugenia hodgei McVaugh
- Eugenia holdridgei Alain
- Eugenia homedeboana N.Snow
- Eugenia hondurensis Ant.Molina
- Eugenia horizontalis Pancher ex Brongn. & Gris
- Eugenia hovarum H.Perrier
- Eugenia howardiana Proctor
- Eugenia huasteca Sánchez-Cháv. & Zamudio
- Eugenia humaitana Sobral & M.A.D.Souza
- Eugenia humblotii Engl. & Brehmer
- Eugenia hurlimannii Guillaumin
- Eugenia hypargyrea Standl.

== I ==
- Eugenia iantarensis N.Snow
- Eugenia ibarrae Lundell
- Eugenia ignota Britton & P.Wilson
- Eugenia ilalensis Hieron.
- Eugenia illepida McVaugh
- Eugenia imbricata O.Berg
- Eugenia imbricatocordata Amshoff
- Eugenia impressa (O.Berg) Mattos
- Eugenia impunctata O.Berg
- Eugenia inaequisepala Peter G.Wilson
- Eugenia incanescens Benth.
- Eugenia inconspicua Standl.
- Eugenia indica (Wight) Chithra
- Eugenia indistincta Sobral & Stadnik
- Eugenia inirebensis P.E.Sánchez
- Eugenia insulartensis J.W.Dawson ex N.Snow
- Eugenia intermedia O.Berg
- Eugenia intibucana Barrie
- Eugenia inundata DC.
- Eugenia inversa Sobral
- Eugenia involucrata DC.
- Eugenia irazuensis Hemsl.
- Eugenia irirensis O.Berg
- Eugenia isabeliana Kiaersk.
- Eugenia ischnosceles O.Berg
- Eugenia isosticta Urb.
- Eugenia itacarensis Mattos
- Eugenia itaguahiensis Nied.
- Eugenia itahypensis O.Berg
- Eugenia itajurensis Cambess.
- Eugenia itapemirimensis Cambess.
- Eugenia itararensis (Mattos) Mattos
- Eugenia itaunensis Giaretta & Peixoto
- Eugenia iteophylla Krug & Urb.
- Eugenia izabalana Lundell

== J ==
- Eugenia jambosoides C.Wright ex Griseb.
- Eugenia janeirensis O.Berg
- Eugenia jeremiensis Urb. & Ekman
- Eugenia jimenezii Alain
- Eugenia joenssonii Kausel
- Eugenia joseramosii M.A.D.Souza & Scud.
- Eugenia jussara Costa-Lima & E.C.O.Chagas
- Eugenia jutai M.A.D.Souza & Sobral
- Eugenia jutiapensis Standl. & Steyerm.

== K ==
- Eugenia kaalensis Guillaumin
- Eugenia kaieteurensis Amshoff
- Eugenia kalamii Shareef, E.S.S.Kumar, Shaju & Prakashk.
- Eugenia kalbreyeri Engl. & Brehmer
- Eugenia kamelii Merr.
- Eugenia kameruniana Engl.
- Eugenia kanakana N.Snow
- Eugenia karwinskyana O.Berg
- Eugenia kellyana Proctor
- Eugenia kerianthera M.A.D.Souza
- Eugenia kerstingii Engl. & Brehmer
- Eugenia klaineana (Pierre) Engl.
- Eugenia kleinii D.Legrand
- Eugenia klotzschiana O.Berg
- Eugenia koepperi Standl.
- Eugenia koolauensis O.Deg.
- Eugenia krukoffiana (Kausel) B.Holst
- Eugenia kuebuniensis Guillaumin
- Eugenia kuekii Giaretta & Peixoto

== L ==
- Eugenia lacerosepala N.Snow
- Eugenia lacistema Sobral
- Eugenia laeteviridis Urb.
- Eugenia laevis O.Berg
- Eugenia lagoensis Kiaersk.
- Eugenia lambertiana DC.
- Eugenia lamprophylla Urb.
- Eugenia lancetillae Standl.
- Eugenia langsdorffii O.Berg
- Eugenia laruotteana Cambess.
- Eugenia lasiothecia Giaretta
- Eugenia latifolia Aubl.
- Eugenia laurae Proctor
- Eugenia laxa DC.
- Eugenia ledermannii Engl. & Brehmer
- Eugenia ledophylla (Standl.) McVaugh
- Eugenia legrandii (Mattos) Mattos
- Eugenia lempana Barrie
- Eugenia leonensis Engl. & Brehmer
- Eugenia leonorae Mattos
- Eugenia lepidota O.Berg
- Eugenia leptoclada O.Berg
- Eugenia letreroana Lundell
- Eugenia leucadendron O.Berg
- Eugenia leucogyna Sobral
- Eugenia levinervis (Fosberg) A.J.Scott
- Eugenia lheritieriana DC.
- Eugenia lhotzkyana O.Berg
- Eugenia libanensis Urb.
- Eugenia libens M.A.D.Souza & Sobral
- Eugenia liberiana Amshoff
- Eugenia librevillensis Amshoff
- Eugenia liebmannii Standl.
- Eugenia liesneri Barrie
- Eugenia ligustrina (Sw.) Willd.
- Eugenia ligustroides Urb.
- Eugenia lilloana D.Legrand
- Eugenia limbosa O.Berg
- Eugenia linaresii Parra-Os.
- Eugenia lindahlii Urb. & Ekman
- Eugenia linearis A.Rich. ex O.Berg
- Eugenia lineata (Sw.) DC.
- Eugenia lineolata Urb. & Ekman
- Eugenia lisboae M.A.D.Souza
- Eugenia lithosperma Barrie
- Eugenia littoralis Pancher ex Brongn. & Gris
- Eugenia livida O.Berg
- Eugenia locuples Barrie
- Eugenia loeseneri Urb.
- Eugenia loheri C.B.Rob.
- Eugenia lokohensis H.Perrier
- Eugenia lomensis Britton & P.Wilson
- Eugenia lomeroensis Villarroel & Bezerra
- Eugenia longa M.A.D.Souza & Sobral
- Eugenia longibracteata Mazine
- Eugenia longicuspis McVaugh
- Eugenia longifolia DC.
- Eugenia longimitra Sobral, M.C.Souza & J.M.A.Braga
- Eugenia longipetiolata Mattos
- Eugenia longiracemosa Kiaersk.
- Eugenia longisepala M.L.Kawas. & B.Holst
- Eugenia longuensis N.Snow
- Eugenia lotoides (Guillaumin) J.W.Dawson & N.Snow
- Eugenia louisae N.Snow
- Eugenia louvelii H.Perrier
- Eugenia lucens Alain
- Eugenia luciae Amshoff
- Eugenia lucida Lam.
- Eugenia ludoviciana Gómez-Laur.
- Eugenia luschnathiana (O.Berg) Klotzsch ex B.D.Jacks.

== M ==
- Eugenia mabaeoides Wight
- Eugenia macahensis O.Berg
- Eugenia macedoi Mattos & D.Legrand
- Eugenia mackeeana Guillaumin
- Eugenia macnabiana (Krug & Urb.) Urb.
- Eugenia macradenia Urb. & Ekman
- Eugenia macrantha O.Berg
- Eugenia macrobracteolata Mattos
- Eugenia macrocarpa Schltdl. & Cham.
- Eugenia macrosperma DC.
- Eugenia madagascariensis (H.Perrier) A.J.Scott
- Eugenia madugodaense Kosterm.
- Eugenia maestrensis Urb.
- Eugenia magna B.Holst
- Eugenia magnibracteolata Mattos & D.Legrand
- Eugenia magnifica Spring ex Mart.
- Eugenia magniflora Barrie
- Eugenia magnisepala Bünger & Mazine
- Eugenia magoana Lundell
- Eugenia malacantha D.Legrand
- Eugenia malangensis (O.Hoffm.) Nied.
- Eugenia malcomberi N.Snow
- Eugenia malpighioides (Kunth) DC.
- Eugenia mammifera Costa-Lima & E.C.O.Chagas
- Eugenia manausensis Mattos
- Eugenia mandevillensis Urb.
- Eugenia mandioccensis O.Berg
- Eugenia mandonii McVaugh
- Eugenia manickamiana Murugan
- Eugenia manomboensis N.Snow
- Eugenia manonae N.Snow & Rabenant.
- Eugenia mansoi O.Berg
- Eugenia marambaiensis M.C.Souza & M.P.Lima
- Eugenia maranhaoensis G.Don
- Eugenia maricaensis G.M.Barroso
- Eugenia marieensis Sobral & M.A.D.Souza
- Eugenia maritima DC.
- Eugenia marleneae M.A.D.Souza & M.Mendonça
- Eugenia marlierioides Rusby
- Eugenia marowynensis Miq.
- Eugenia marshiana Griseb.
- Eugenia martinellii (G.M.Barroso & M.Peron) Stadnik, D.K.D.Caldas & M.C.Souza
- Eugenia matagalpensis P.E.Sánchez
- Eugenia matogrossensis Sobral
- Eugenia mattosii D.Legrand
- Eugenia matudae Lundell
- Eugenia maxima (McVaugh) Mattos
- Eugenia mcphersonii Barrie
- Eugenia mcvaughii Steyerm. & Lasser
- Eugenia megaflora Govaerts
- Eugenia megalopetala Griseb.
- Eugenia megamalayana Murugan & Arum.
- Eugenia melanadenia Krug & Urb.
- Eugenia melanogyna (D.Legrand) Sobral
- Eugenia melocactoides Parra-Os.
- Eugenia membranifolia Nied.
- Eugenia memecyloides Benth.
- Eugenia mensurensis Urb.
- Eugenia meridensis Steyerm.
- Eugenia mespiloides Lam.
- Eugenia mestrealvarensis Valdemarin & Mazine
- Eugenia michaelneei Villarroel & Faria
- Eugenia michoacanensis Lundell
- Eugenia micranthoides McVaugh
- Eugenia micropora DC.
- Eugenia mimetica Sobral & M.C.Souza
- Eugenia mimus McVaugh
- Eugenia minguetii Urb.
- Eugenia minuscula McVaugh
- Eugenia miragoanae (Urb.) Flickinger
- Eugenia modesta DC.
- Eugenia molinae Barrie
- Eugenia mollicoma Mart. ex O.Berg
- Eugenia mollifolia Urb.
- Eugenia monosperma Vell.
- Eugenia montalbanica Merr.
- Eugenia monteverdensis Barrie
- Eugenia monticola (Sw.) DC.
- Eugenia mooniana Wight
- Eugenia moonioides O.Berg
- Eugenia morii B.Holst & M.L.Kawas.
- Eugenia moritziana H.Karst.
- Eugenia moschata (Aubl.) Nied. ex T.Durand & B.D.Jacks.
- Eugenia mosenii (Kausel) Sobral
- Eugenia mouensis Baker f.
- Eugenia mozomboensis P.E.Sánchez
- Eugenia mucronata O.Berg
- Eugenia mucugensis Sobral
- Eugenia mufindiensis Verdc.
- Eugenia multicostata D.Legrand
- Eugenia multilocellata Sobral & M.A.D.Souza
- Eugenia multirimosa McVaugh
- Eugenia muricata DC.
- Eugenia muscicola H.Perrier
- Eugenia myrcianthes Nied.
- Eugenia myrciariifolia Soares-Silva & Sobral
- Eugenia myrobalana DC.

== N ==
- Eugenia naguana Urb.
- Eugenia nannophylla Urb. & Ekman
- Eugenia naraveana Cházaro & Franc.Gut.
- Eugenia neibensis (Alain) Mattos
- Eugenia nematopoda Urb.
- Eugenia neofasciculata Bennet
- Eugenia neograndifolia Mattos
- Eugenia neolaurifolia Sobral
- Eugenia neomattogrossensis Mazine
- Eugenia neomyrtifolia Sobral
- Eugenia neophaea Sobral & Mazine
- Eugenia neoriedeliana M.C.Souza & Giaretta
- Eugenia neosilvestris Sobral
- Eugenia neotristis Sobral
- Eugenia neoverrucosa Sobral
- Eugenia nervosa Lour.
- Eugenia nesiotica Standl.
- Eugenia nigerina A.Chev.
- Eugenia nigrita Lundell
- Eugenia nipensis Urb.
- Eugenia nodulosa Urb.
- Eugenia nompa H.Perrier
- Eugenia nordestina L.R.V.Santos & I.R.Costa
- Eugenia nosibensis N.Snow
- Eugenia noumeensis Guillaumin
- Eugenia nutans O.Berg

== O ==
- Eugenia oaxacana O.Berg
- Eugenia obanensis Baker f.
- Eugenia obovatifolia N.Snow
- Eugenia obscura (Lindl.) DC.
- Eugenia ocanensis Linden ex Regel
- Eugenia ochracea Valdemarin & Mazine
- Eugenia ochrophloea Diels
- Eugenia octopleura Krug & Urb.
- Eugenia oerstediana O.Berg
- Eugenia ogoouensis Amshoff
- Eugenia oligadenia Urb.
- Eugenia oligandra Krug & Urb.
- Eugenia ombrophila H.Perrier
- Eugenia omissa McVaugh
- Eugenia orbiculata Lam.
- Eugenia orlandoi (Mattos) Mattos
- Eugenia ouen-toroensis Guillaumin
- Eugenia ovalis O.Berg
- Eugenia ovandensis Lundell
- Eugenia ovigera Brongn. & Gris
- Eugenia oxysepala Urb.

== P ==
- Eugenia pachakumachiana Arum. & Murugan
- Eugenia pachnantha O.Berg
- Eugenia pachyadenia (Urb. & Ekman) Flickinger
- Eugenia pachychlamys Donn.Sm.
- Eugenia pachychremastra Guillaumin
- Eugenia pachyclada D.Legrand
- Eugenia pachypoda T.Fern. & Sobral
- Eugenia pachystachya McVaugh
- Eugenia pacifica Benth.
- Eugenia padronii Alain
- Eugenia pallidopunctata Mazine
- Eugenia palmarina Costa-Lima & E.C.O.Chagas
- Eugenia paloverdensis Barrie
- Eugenia paludosa Pancher ex Brongn. & Gris
- Eugenia palumbis Merr.
- Eugenia pantagensis O.Berg
- Eugenia pantanalensis Faria & Sobral
- Eugenia papalensis Standl. & Steyerm.
- Eugenia papayoensis Urb.
- Eugenia paracatuana O.Berg
- Eugenia paradisiaca Giaretta
- Eugenia paranaensis (Mattos) Mattos
- Eugenia paranahybensis O.Berg
- Eugenia paranapanemensis Valdemarin & Mazine
- Eugenia pardensis O.Berg
- Eugenia pasacaensis C.B.Rob.
- Eugenia pascaliana Byng, Bernardini & N.Snow
- Eugenia patrisii Vahl
- Eugenia pauciflora DC.
- Eugenia penduliflora Valdemarin & Mazine
- Eugenia peninsularis Urb.
- Eugenia percincta McVaugh
- Eugenia percivalii Lundell
- Eugenia percrenata McVaugh
- Eugenia perriniana Urb. & Ekman
- Eugenia persicifolia O.Berg
- Eugenia peruibensis Mattos
- Eugenia petaloidea Giaretta & B.S.Amorim
- Eugenia petrikensis N.Snow & Randriat.
- Eugenia petrinensis N.Snow
- Eugenia petrophila Urb.
- Eugenia philippioides H.Perrier
- Eugenia phillyreoides Trimen
- Eugenia phyllocardia Urb.
- Eugenia pia DC.
- Eugenia picardiae Krug & Urb.
- Eugenia piedraensis Urb.
- Eugenia piloesis Cambess.
- Eugenia pilosula Krug & Urb.
- Eugenia pinariensis Urb.
- Eugenia pinetorum Urb.
- Eugenia pinifolia Mart. ex O.Berg
- Eugenia pipensis A.R.Lourenço & B.S.Amorim
- Eugenia piresiana Cambess.
- Eugenia piresii Mattos
- Eugenia pisiformis Cambess.
- Eugenia pisonis O.Berg
- Eugenia pistaciifolia DC.
- Eugenia pitanga (O.Berg) Nied.
- Eugenia pithecocephala Mazine & Sobral
- Eugenia pitrensis Urb.
- Eugenia pittieri Standl.
- Eugenia platyphylla O.Berg
- Eugenia platysema O.Berg
- Eugenia pleurocarpa Standl.
- Eugenia plicatocostata O.Berg
- Eugenia plicatula C.Wright
- Eugenia plinioides Urb. & Ekman
- Eugenia pluricymosa H.Perrier
- Eugenia pluriflora DC.
- Eugenia plurinervia N.Snow, Munzinger & Callm.
- Eugenia pobeguinii Aubrév.
- Eugenia pocsiana Borhidi
- Eugenia pohliana DC.
- Eugenia poimbailensis (Guillaumin) J.W.Dawson & N.Snow
- Eugenia poiteaui O.Berg
- Eugenia pokkudanii A.M.Maya, K.M.P.Kumar & V.Suresh
- Eugenia poliensis Aubrév. & Pellegr.
- Eugenia pollicina J.Guého & A.J.Scott
- Eugenia polyadena O.Berg
- Eugenia polyclada Urb. & Ekman
- Eugenia polypora Urb.
- Eugenia polystachya Rich.
- Eugenia pomifera (Aubl.) Urb.
- Eugenia potiraguensis K.Cout. & M.Ibrahim
- Eugenia pozasia Urb. & Ekman
- Eugenia praeterita McVaugh
- Eugenia prasina O.Berg
- Eugenia principium McVaugh
- Eugenia procera (Sw.) Poir.
- Eugenia producta DC.
- Eugenia prolixa S.Moore
- Eugenia prolongata M.L.Kawas. & B.Holst
- Eugenia pronyensis Guillaumin
- Eugenia prostrata Mattos
- Eugenia protenta McVaugh
- Eugenia pruinosa D.Legrand
- Eugenia pruniformis Cambess.
- Eugenia pseudomabaeoides Kosterm.
- Eugenia pseudomalacantha D.Legrand
- Eugenia pseudopsidium Jacq.
- Eugenia psidioidea (J.Guého & A.J.Scott) N.Snow
- Eugenia psiloclada Urb.
- Eugenia pterocarpa Baill.
- Eugenia pteroclada Urb.
- Eugenia puberula Nied.
- Eugenia pubescens (Kunth) DC.
- Eugenia pubicalyx Alain
- Eugenia pubiflora N.Snow & Callm.
- Eugenia pueblana Lundell
- Eugenia pulcherrima Kiaersk.
- Eugenia punicifolia (Kunth) DC.
- Eugenia purpusii Standl.
- Eugenia pusilla N.E.Br.
- Eugenia pusilliflora M.L.Kawas. & B.Holst
- Eugenia pustulescens McVaugh
- Eugenia pyrifera Faria & Proença
- Eugenia pyriflora O.Berg
- Eugenia pyriformis Cambess.
- Eugenia pyxidata (J.Guého & A.J.Scott) N.Snow

== Q ==
- Eugenia quadriflora H.Perrier
- Eugenia quadrijuga McVaugh
- Eugenia quadriovulata Amshoff
- Eugenia quadriphylla N.Snow & Callm.
- Eugenia quebradensis McVaugh
- Eugenia quercetorum Standl. & L.O.Williams ex Barrie
- Eugenia queretaroana Sánchez-Cháv. & Zamudio
- Eugenia quilombola B.S.Amorim, M.A.D.Souza & Giaretta
- Eugenia quiriri Sobral & F.C.S.Vieira

== R ==
- Eugenia racemiflora O.Berg
- Eugenia radiciflora H.Perrier
- Eugenia ramboi D.Legrand
- Eugenia ramiflora Desv.
- Eugenia ramonae Borhidi & O.Muñiz
- Eugenia ramoniana Urb.
- Eugenia randrianasoloi J.S.Mill.
- Eugenia ranomafana N.Snow & D.Turk
- Eugenia rara Rigueira & Sobral
- Eugenia ravelonarivoi N.Snow & Callm.
- Eugenia ravenii Lundell
- Eugenia razakamalalae N.Snow & Callm.
- Eugenia regia Bünger & Sobral
- Eugenia reinwardtiana (Blume) DC.
- Eugenia reitziana D.Legrand
- Eugenia rekoi Standl.
- Eugenia rendlei Urb.
- Eugenia repanda O.Berg
- Eugenia reperta Sobral & Mazine
- Eugenia reticularis O.Berg
- Eugenia retinadenia C.Wright
- Eugenia rheophytica Kosterm.
- Eugenia rhombea (O.Berg) Krug & Urb.
- Eugenia rhytidocalyx M.A.D.Souza & Sobral
- Eugenia richardii (Blume) N.Snow, Callm. & Phillipson
- Eugenia rigida DC.
- Eugenia rigidifolia A.Rich.
- Eugenia rigidula Britton & P.Wilson
- Eugenia rimosa C.Wright
- Eugenia rinconiensis Mattos
- Eugenia riograndis Lundell
- Eugenia riosiae Barrie
- Eugenia rivulorum Thwaites
- Eugenia rizziniana Mattos
- Eugenia rizzoana Mattos
- Eugenia robustior Faria & Proença
- Eugenia rocana Britton & P.Wilson
- Eugenia rodriguesensis J.Guého & A.J.Scott
- Eugenia rodriguesii (Mattos & D.Legrand) Mattos
- Eugenia rogersiana (Mattos) Parra-Os.
- Eugenia roigii Urb.
- Eugenia rojasiana (D.Legrand) Mattos
- Eugenia rosariensis Borhidi
- Eugenia rosea DC.
- Eugenia roseauxensis Flickinger
- Eugenia roseiflora McVaugh
- Eugenia roseola Barrie, C.A.Ramos & O.Ortiz
- Eugenia roseopetala Barrie, I.Vergara & McPherson
- Eugenia roseopetiolata N.Snow & Cable
- Eugenia rostratofalcata Mattos & D.Legrand
- Eugenia rostrifolia D.Legrand
- Eugenia rottleriana Wight & Arn.
- Eugenia rotula Sobral
- Eugenia rotundata (Trimen) Trimen
- Eugenia rotundicosta D.Legrand
- Eugenia roxburghii DC.
- Eugenia rubella Lundell
- Eugenia rufidula Lundell
- Eugenia rufofulva Thwaites
- Eugenia rugosissima Sobral
- Eugenia ruschiana Bünger, Mazine & Stehmann

== S ==
- Eugenia sachetiae Proctor
- Eugenia salacifolia Bünger & Mazine
- Eugenia salacioides G.Lawson ex Hutch. & Dalziel
- Eugenia salamensis Donn.Sm.
- Eugenia salomonica G.T.White
- Eugenia samuelssonii Ekman & Urb.
- Eugenia sancarlosensis Barrie
- Eugenia sanjuanensis P.E.Sánchez
- Eugenia sapoensis Jongkind
- Eugenia sarahchazaroi Cházaro, Franc.Gut. & J.R.Carral
- Eugenia sarapiquensis P.E.Sánchez
- Eugenia sarasinii Guillaumin
- Eugenia sargentii Merr.
- Eugenia sasoana Standl. & Steyerm.
- Eugenia sauvallei Krug & Urb.
- Eugenia savannarum Standl. & Steyerm.
- Eugenia saxatilis Sobral & Bünger
- Eugenia scalariformis McVaugh
- Eugenia scaphephylla C.Wright
- Eugenia schatzii J.S.Mill.
- Eugenia scheffleri Engl. & Brehmer
- Eugenia schottiana O.Berg
- Eugenia schulziana Urb.
- Eugenia schunkei McVaugh
- Eugenia sclerocalyx D.Legrand
- Eugenia scottii H.Perrier
- Eugenia sebastiani Urb.
- Eugenia sebastianopolitana (G.M.Barroso) Stadnik, D.K.D.Caldas & M.C.Souza
- Eugenia sehnemiana (Mattos) Mattos
- Eugenia seislagoana M.A.D.Souza & Sobral
- Eugenia seithurensis Gopalan & S.R.Sriniv.
- Eugenia selloi B.D.Jacks.
- Eugenia sellowiana DC.
- Eugenia selvana Barrie
- Eugenia sericifolia M.L.Kawas. & B.Holst
- Eugenia serraegrandis Sobral
- Eugenia serrasuela Krug & Urb.
- Eugenia serrei Urb.
- Eugenia sessiliflora Vahl
- Eugenia sessilifolia DC.
- Eugenia shaferi Urb.
- Eugenia shettyana Murugan & Gopalan
- Eugenia shimishito Barrie
- Eugenia shookii Lundell
- Eugenia sicifolia J.W.Dawson & N.Snow
- Eugenia sieberi J.Guého & A.J.Scott
- Eugenia siggersii Standl.
- Eugenia sigillata McVaugh
- Eugenia sihanakensis H.Perrier
- Eugenia siltepecana Lundell
- Eugenia sinaloae Standl.
- Eugenia sinemariensis Aubl.
- Eugenia singampattiana Bedd.
- Eugenia sintenisii Kiaersk.
- Eugenia sipaliwinensis Giaretta
- Eugenia sloanei Urb.
- Eugenia sobraliana Giaretta & Fraga
- Eugenia sobralii Mattos
- Eugenia solimoensis O.Berg
- Eugenia sonderiana O.Berg
- Eugenia sooiana Borhidi
- Eugenia soteriana Giaretta & Valdemarin
- Eugenia sotoesparzae P.E.Sánchez
- Eugenia sparsa S.Moore
- Eugenia speciosa Cambess.
- Eugenia sphaerocarpa Vadhyar, Sujana, J.H.F.Benj. & G.V.S.Murthy
- Eugenia sphenoides O.Berg
- Eugenia splendens O.Berg
- Eugenia sprengelii DC.
- Eugenia spruceana O.Berg
- Eugenia squamiflora Mattos
- Eugenia sripadaense Kosterm.
- Eugenia stahlii (Kiaersk.) Krug & Urb.
- Eugenia standleyi McVaugh
- Eugenia staudtii Engl. & Brehmer
- Eugenia stenoptera Urb.
- Eugenia stenosepala Kiaersk.
- Eugenia stenosepaloides Mattos
- Eugenia stenoxipha Urb.
- Eugenia stephanophylla Baker f.
- Eugenia stereophylla Urb.
- Eugenia stewardsonii Britton
- Eugenia stibephylla N.Snow & Rabeh.
- Eugenia stictopetala DC.
- Eugenia stictophylla N.Snow & Razafimam.
- Eugenia stigmatosa DC.
- Eugenia stipitata McVaugh
- Eugenia stirpiflora (O.Berg) Krug & Urb.
- Eugenia stolonifera (D.Legrand & Mattos) Mazine
- Eugenia strellensis O.Berg
- Eugenia stricta Pancher ex Brongn. & Gris
- Eugenia strigipes O.Berg
- Eugenia studerae B.S.Amorim
- Eugenia sturrockii R.A.Howard
- Eugenia stylaris McVaugh
- Eugenia styphelioides (Schltr.) J.W.Dawson & N.Snow
- Eugenia subamplexicaulis DC.
- Eugenia subavenia O.Berg
- Eugenia subcordata Wight & Arn.
- Eugenia subdisticha Urb.
- Eugenia suberosa Cambess.
- Eugenia subglomerata (Kuntze) Sobral
- Eugenia subherbacea A.Chev.
- Eugenia submontana B.S.Amorim & M.Alves
- Eugenia subreticulata Glaz.
- Eugenia subspinulosa Borhidi & O.Muñiz
- Eugenia subterminalis DC.
- Eugenia subundulata Kiaersk.
- Eugenia sudestis Sobral
- Eugenia sulcata Spring ex Mart.
- Eugenia sulcatifolia L.D.Meireles & Mazine
- Eugenia sulcivenia Krug & Urb.
- Eugenia sumbensis Greves
- Eugenia superba T.Fern., M.C.Souza & J.M.A.Braga
- Eugenia supraaxillaris Spring ex Mart.
- Eugenia symphoricarpos McVaugh

== T ==
- Eugenia tachirensis Steyerm.
- Eugenia tafelbergica Amshoff
- Eugenia tain Rod.Flores, B.Holst & A.Ibáñez
- Eugenia talbotii Keay
- Eugenia tamaensis Steyerm.
- Eugenia tanaensis Verdc.
- Eugenia tapirorum Standl.
- Eugenia tchambaensis J.W.Dawson & N.Snow
- Eugenia teapensis McVaugh
- Eugenia tenuiflora Mazine
- Eugenia tenuimarginata McVaugh
- Eugenia tenuipedunculata Kiaersk.
- Eugenia tephrogyna Sobral & Proença
- Eugenia tepuiensis Steyerm.
- Eugenia teresa-ruiziana Villarroel & Faria
- Eugenia teresae J.F.Morales
- Eugenia ternatifolia Cambess.
- Eugenia terpnophylla Thwaites
- Eugenia tetramera (McVaugh) M.L.Kawas. & B.Holst
- Eugenia tetrasticha Poepp. ex O.Berg
- Eugenia theodorae Kiaersk.
- Eugenia thikaensis Verdc.
- Eugenia thollonii Amshoff
- Eugenia thouvenotiana H.Perrier
- Eugenia tiampoka N.Snow & Callm.
- Eugenia tikalana Lundell
- Eugenia tilarana Barrie
- Eugenia tingui Sobral
- Eugenia tinifolia Lam.
- Eugenia tisserantii Aubrév. & Pellegr.
- Eugenia tiwakaensis J.W.Dawson & N.Snow
- Eugenia toaensis Borhidi & O.Muñiz
- Eugenia togoensis Engl.
- Eugenia toledinensis Lundell
- Eugenia toledoi (Mattos) Mattos
- Eugenia tomasina Urb.
- Eugenia tonii Lundell
- Eugenia torbeciana (Urb. & Ekman) Flickinger
- Eugenia tovomita Sobral & M.A.D.Souza
- Eugenia toxanatolica Verdc.
- Eugenia trahyra Barb.Rodr.
- Eugenia trichogyna Sobral, I.G.Costa & M.C.Souza
- Eugenia triflora (Jacq.) Ham.
- Eugenia trikii Lundell
- Eugenia trinervia Vahl
- Eugenia trinitatis DC.
- Eugenia tropophylla H.Perrier
- Eugenia truncata O.Berg
- Eugenia trunciflora (Schltdl. & Cham.) G.Don
- Eugenia tuberculata (Kunth) DC.
- Eugenia tulanan Merr.
- Eugenia tumescens B.S.Amorim & M.Alves
- Eugenia tumulescens McVaugh
- Eugenia tungo Hiern
- Eugenia turneri McVaugh

== U ==
- Eugenia ulei (Diels) McVaugh
- Eugenia uliginosa Lundell
- Eugenia umbellata Spreng.
- Eugenia umbellulifera (Kunth) Krug & Urb.
- Eugenia umbonata McVaugh
- Eugenia umbrosa O.Berg
- Eugenia uminganensis Peter G.Wilson
- Eugenia umtamvunensis A.E.van Wyk
- Eugenia unana Sobral
- Eugenia underwoodii Britton
- Eugenia undulata Aubl.
- Eugenia uniflora L.
- Eugenia uninervia Rusby
- Eugenia urbanii Flickinger
- Eugenia urschiana H.Perrier
- Eugenia ursina Lundell
- Eugenia uruguayensis Cambess.
- Eugenia uxpanapensis P.E.Sánchez & L.M.Ortega

== V ==
- Eugenia vacana Lundell
- Eugenia vallecaucana Parra-Os.
- Eugenia valsuganana Sobral
- Eugenia valvata McVaugh
- Eugenia vanderveldei Urb. & Ekman
- Eugenia vanwykiana N.Snow
- Eugenia varia Britton & P.Wilson
- Eugenia variareolata McVaugh
- Eugenia vatomandrensis H.Perrier
- Eugenia vattimoana Mattos
- Eugenia vaughanii J.Guého & A.J.Scott
- Eugenia veadeirensis Villarroel & Faria
- Eugenia veillonii N.Snow & Callm.
- Eugenia velliangiriana Murug., V.Ravich., Murugan & Arum.
- Eugenia velutifolia Mazine & Sobral
- Eugenia venezuelensis O.Berg
- Eugenia veraguensis Rod.Flores & A.Ibáñez
- Eugenia verapazensis Lundell
- Eugenia verdcourtii Byng
- Eugenia verdoorniae A.E.van Wyk
- Eugenia vernicosa O.Berg
- Eugenia verruculata Barrie
- Eugenia versicolor McVaugh
- Eugenia verticillata (Vell.) Angely
- Eugenia vesca Lundell
- Eugenia vetula DC.
- Eugenia victoriana Cuatrec.
- Eugenia victorinii Alain
- Eugenia vigiensis Urb.
- Eugenia viguieriana H.Perrier
- Eugenia vilersii H.Perrier
- Eugenia villae-novae Kiaersk.
- Eugenia violascens O.Berg
- Eugenia viridiflora Cambess.
- Eugenia viridis (Vell.) O.Berg
- Eugenia virotii Guillaumin
- Eugenia viscacea Sobral

== W ==
- Eugenia walkerae Flickinger
- Eugenia wallenii Macfad.
- Eugenia warmingiana Kiaersk.
- Eugenia websteri Proctor
- Eugenia wentii Amshoff
- Eugenia whytei Sprague
- Eugenia widgrenii Sond. ex O.Berg
- Eugenia williamsiana N.Snow
- Eugenia wilsonella Fawc. & Rendle
- Eugenia wilsoniana N.Snow
- Eugenia winzerlingii Standl.
- Eugenia woodburyana Alain
- Eugenia woodfrediana Urb.
- Eugenia woodii Dummer
- Eugenia wullschlaegeliana Amshoff
- Eugenia wurdackii (McVaugh) Mattos
- Eugenia wynadensis Bedd.

== X ==
- Eugenia xalapensis (Kunth) DC.
- Eugenia xanthoxyloides Cambess.
- Eugenia xilitlensis McVaugh
- Eugenia xinguana Sobral, M.A.D.Souza & G.Amorim
- Eugenia xiriricana Mattos
- Eugenia xystophylla O.Berg

== Y ==
- Eugenia yangambensis Amshoff
- Eugenia yasuniana B.Holst & M.L.Kawas.
- Eugenia yatuae (McVaugh) B.Holst
- Eugenia yautepecana Lundell
- Eugenia yunckeri Standl.

== Z ==
- Eugenia zamorensis B.Holst & M.L.Kawas.
- Eugenia zelayensis P.E.Sánchez
- Eugenia zigzag K.Cout. & Sobral
- Eugenia zuchowskiae Barrie
- Eugenia zuluensis Dummer
- Eugenia zygophylla Govaerts
