= Douepea =

Scientific classification
- Kingdom: Plantae
- Clade: Tracheophytes
- Clade: Angiosperms
- Clade: Eudicots
- Clade: Rosids
- Order: Brassicales
- Family: Brassicaceae
- Genus: Douepea; Cambess.

Synonyms
- Dolichorhynchus Hedge & Kit Tan

Genus of plants

Douepea is a genus of flowering plants belonging to the family Brassicaceae. It includes two species which are native to western Pakistan and Saudi Arabia.

The genus name of Douepea is in honour of Herman van Donep, a government secretary in Kochi. and it was published in Mém. Soc. Bot. France Vol.8 on page 297 in 1917. It was published in V.Jacquemont, Voy. Inde Vol.4 on page 18 in 1841.

Known species:

- Douepea arabica (Hedge & Kit Tan) O.Appel & Al-Shehbaz – northwestern Saudi Arabia
- Douepea tortuosa Cambess. – western Pakistan
