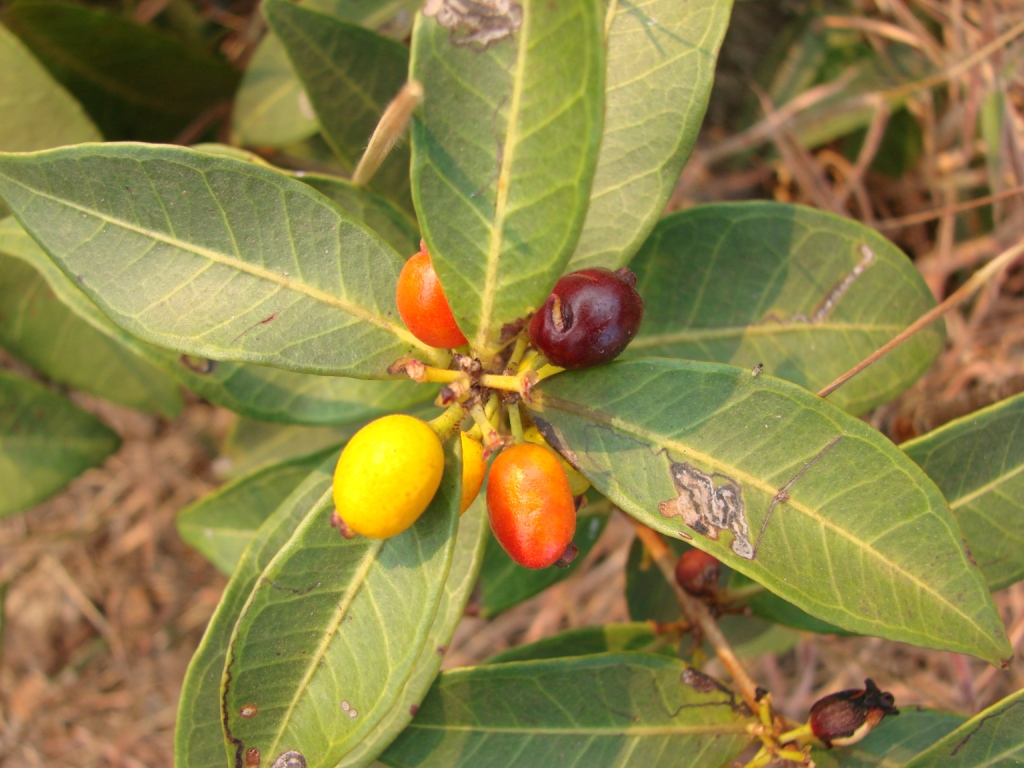
- Fruiting Eugenia calycina plant

Scientific classification
- Kingdom: Plantae
- Clade: Tracheophytes
- Clade: Angiosperms
- Clade: Eudicots
- Clade: Rosids
- Order: Myrtales
- Family: Myrtaceae
- Genus: Eugenia
- Species: E. calycina

Binomial name
- Eugenia calycina Cambess. (1832)

Varieties
- Eugenia calycina var. herbacea (O.Berg) Mattos

Synonyms
- Eugenia calycina var. calycina; Eugenia goyazensis Nied.; Eugenia lundiana Kiaersk.; Phyllocalyx calycinus (Cambess.) O.Berg; Phyllocalyx regelianus Berg; Eugenia calycina var. herbacea: Eugenia jaguariaevensis var. brevipedunculata Mattos; Eugenia jaguariaivensis Mattos; Eugenia jaguariaivensis var. brevipedunculata Mattos; Eugenia suffrutescens Nied.; Eugenia suffrutescens var. brevipedunculata (Mattos) Mattos; Phyllocalyx herbaceus Berg

= Eugenia calycina =

Species of plant

Eugenia calycina, also known as savannah cherry, field cherry, Jabuti cherry, Grão de galo, cerejinha, cereja do cerrado, pitanga-vermelha, red pitanga, cherry of the Cerrado, and ca-ajaboti, is a flowering shrub in the family Myrtaceae. The specific epithet (calycina) comes from Latin calycinus, meaning having a notable calyx.

== Distribution ==
Eugenia calycina is native to Brazil, including but not exclusive to the states of Goiás, São Paulo, Minas Gerais, Mato Grosso do Sul, and Paraná. It grows wild in savannahs and fields up to 1,600 meters (5,200 feet) in elevation, especially in drier areas.

== Description ==
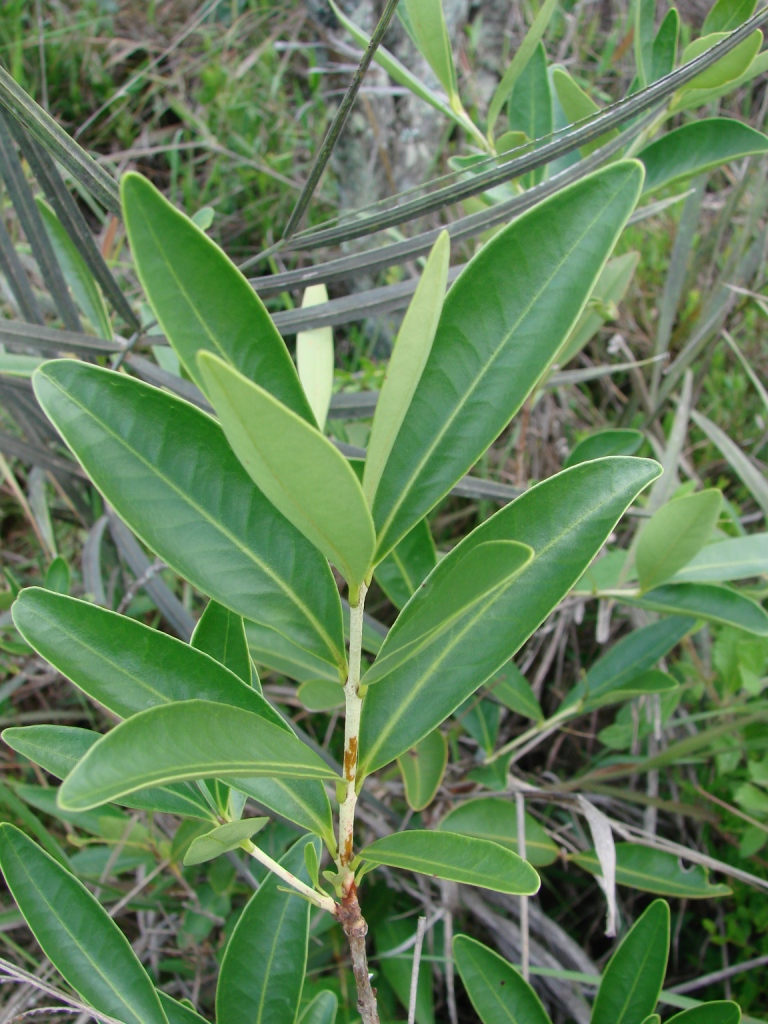
Eugenia calycina at the Brasília Botanical Garden, Brasília, Brazil

Eugenia calycina grows up to 2 meters (6.6 feet) in height, although is normally between 0.7 and 1.5 meters (2.3 and 4.9 feet). The narrow, coriaceous leaves are evergreen and elliptic in shape. The flowers are pinkish-white with four round petals. They arise to new settlements on the side or edge among the stalks and measure 1.5–5.8 centimeters (0.59–2.28 inches) in length. The oblong fruit is dark red to purple when ripe and measures 2.5 centimeters (0.98 inches) in length and 1.5 centimeters (0.59 inches) in width. There are at least two pointed, cordate-based, ovate bracts measuring 0.9–2.2 centimeters (0.35–0.87 inches) in length at the base of each fruit. It is edible and said to have a mild, sweet, berry-like flavor. It contains a single recalcitrant seed which germinates after 30–45 days of being planted. Seedling growth is rapid, with the plant often reaching 20 centimeters (7.9 inches) at 10 months of age. It fruits from November to January and flowers in spring. Fruiting begins when the plant is 2–3 years of age. The plant prefers positions in full sun or partial shade and tolerates semi-arid, rainy temperate, and subtropical to tropical dry and wet climates. They tolerate frost down to −4 °C (25 °F) and tolerate heat to 42 °C (108 °F). It tolerates sandy-loam soils and sand soils with quartz. The pH level of the soil may range from 4.5 to 6.7, with some moisture.

== Uses ==
The fruit is often gathered from the wild and eaten raw or made into jellies and sweets. It is used by native people to treat diabetes.

== Chemistry ==
The fruit is rich in vitamin A. Several sesquiterpenes have been identified from the leaves of Eugenia calycina: bicyclogermacrene, spathulenol, beta-caryophyllene, aromadendrane‐4β,10α‐diol, and 1β‐11‐dihydroxy‐5‐eudesmene. The cytotoxic concentrations of the essential oil in the leaves for HeLa and Vero cells (266.8 ± 46.5 and 312.1 ± 42.5 μg mL−1) in 48 hours of exposure were higher than the LC50, which shows low cytotoxicity at the concentration exhibiting larvicidal activity. This indicates that the essential oil of Eugenia calycina shows high activity against the larvae of Aedes aegypti but has lower cytotoxicity against mammalian cells. Therefore, the leaves of Eugenia calycina are a promising source of natural larvicide. The seeds, fruit pulp, and leaves contain a high phenolic content, with ellagic acid being the main compound with values of 8244.53 μg/g dw (leaves), 5054.43 μg/g dw (pulp), and 715.42 μg/g dw (seed). The total phenolic content in the leaves, pulp, and seed is 20371.96, 7139.70, and 2204.75 μg/g dw, with the main compounds being ellagic acid, myricitrin, and epicatechin gallate. The leaves, pulp, and seeds contain 153 different phytochemicals belonging to different chemical classes, including organic acids, phenolic acids, flavonoids, and others. Eugenia calycina has high potential as a plant food due to its high phenolic content and phytochemical profile. It also contains a number of oxygen-containing compounds such as fatty acids, steroids, and tannins. Compounds with high amounts of oxygen (such as glycosed flavonoids, tannins, and polyphenolic compounds) were revealed to show activity against Cryptococcus sp. D (minimum inhibitory concentration=15.62μg/mL). It was also revealed that compounds contained a decreased amount of oxygen (such as fatty acids and steroids) towards Cryptococcus gattii L48, Cryptococcus neoformans L3 (MIC=31.2μg/mL), and Cryptococcus sp. D (MIC=62.5μg/mL). Therefore, Eugenia calycina has potential for research of active substances that can be used for treatment of cryptococcosis.

== See also ==
- List of Eugenia species
- List of culinary fruits
- List of Brazilian fruits
