= Eugenia squamiflora =

Conservation status
- Data Deficient (IUCN 3.1)

Scientific classification
- Kingdom: Plantae
- Clade: Tracheophytes
- Clade: Angiosperms
- Clade: Eudicots
- Clade: Rosids
- Order: Myrtales
- Family: Myrtaceae
- Genus: Eugenia
- Species: E. squamiflora

Binomial name
- Eugenia squamiflora Mattos

Species of plant

Eugenia squamiflora is a species of flowering plant in the family Myrtaceae. It is a shrub or tree native to Brazil (São Paulo).

== Description ==
It is a shrub or tree and grows primarily in the seasonally dry tropical biome. It can reach a height of 12 meters in its natural habitat of the Atlantic Rainforest of the state of São Paulo. Its common names include brilliant uvaia and Uvaia de Joinville.

The tree produces bright yellow edible fruits with a pleasant sweet-sour flavor reminiscent of Eugenia pyriformis. The fruits are consumed fresh and are also used to make juices, ice creams, and jams.
