= Eugenia astringens =

Conservation status
- Least Concern (IUCN 3.1)

Scientific classification
- Kingdom: Plantae
- Clade: Tracheophytes
- Clade: Angiosperms
- Clade: Eudicots
- Clade: Rosids
- Order: Myrtales
- Family: Myrtaceae
- Genus: Eugenia
- Species: E. astringens

Binomial name
- Eugenia astringens Cambess.

Synonyms
- Synonymy: Eugenia apiocarpa O.Berg; Eugenia casarettoana Delprete, nom. illeg.; Eugenia cassinoides O.Berg, nom. illeg. homonym. post.; Eugenia cassinoides var. difformis O.Berg; Eugenia cassinoides var. gracilis O.Berg; Eugenia cassinoides var. robusta O.Berg; Eugenia cyclophylla O.Berg; Eugenia pluriflora Mart., nom. illeg. homonym. post.; Eugenia rotundifolia Casar., nom. illeg. homonym. post.; Eugenia rotundifolia var. oblongata O.Berg; Eugenia umbelliflora O.Berg

Species of flowering plant

Eugenia astringens is a species of flowering plant in the family Myrtaceae. It is a shrub or tree native to eastern and southern Brazil. It grows in lowland Atlantic rainforest.

The IUCN Red List assesses the species as Least Concern.
