= Eugenia paranapanemensis =

Conservation status
- Critically Endangered (IUCN 3.1)

Scientific classification
- Kingdom: Plantae
- Clade: Tracheophytes
- Clade: Angiosperms
- Clade: Eudicots
- Clade: Rosids
- Order: Myrtales
- Family: Myrtaceae
- Genus: Eugenia
- Species: E. paranapanemensis

Binomial name
- Eugenia paranapanemensis Valdemarin & Mazine
- E.paranapanemensis is native to Southeast Brazil and known to occur in the Mata Atântica rainforest in São Paulo state.

Species of flowering plant

Eugenia paranapanemensis or Pitanga-amarela is a flowering plant in the family Myrtaceae, and was first formally described in 2022 by Karinne Valdemarin et al. It is a large tree which reaches 27 meters (88.5 ft) in height, significantly taller than most species in the genus Eugenia. It is native to Southeast Brazil and can be found in the Mata Atântica rainforest of São Paulo state.

Holotype botanical material can be found at the SORO Herbarium at the Federal University of São Carlos – Sorocaba campus, and duplicate material at the Herbarium Collection of the University of São Paulo.

As of December 2022, only three mature E. paranapanemensis trees have been obseerved in the wild.

== Taxonomy ==
The genus Eugenia was named in honour of the Austrian general Prince Eugene of Savoy. The species epithet paranapanemensis refers to the city of Paranapanema in the São Paulo state, Brazil, where the type specimen was found.

In its native range of São Paulo state, Eugenia paranapanemensis is known as pitanga-amarela, from the Portuguese word amarela 'yellow' and pitanga referring to the Brazilian cherry.

== Description ==
=== Leaves ===
The leaves are oval, with a smooth leaf edge with no teeth or notches, with a deep green colour. The leaves are grow in pairs arranged opposite along the branches. Short hair-like growths (trichomes) may be present on young leaves, which are lost as the leaves mature. The leaves are between 40–75 mm (1.6–3.0 in) in length and 17–32 mm (0.67–1.3 in) in width. Each leaf is attached to the branch by a 5–7 mm (0.20–0.28 in) long petiole that is grooved along its length.

The leaves have a single central vein that runs lengthwise down the centre of each leaf called a midvein. Coming away horizontally from the midvein are 10–12 secondary or lateral veins that reach towards the leaf edge. Both the midvein and secondary veins are raised on the underside of the leaf but, only the secondary veins are raised on the topside.

Eugenia paranapanemensis leaves also have oil glands that are slightly raised on the underside of the leaf which are between 0.06 and 0.1 mm in diameter and occur at four to six glands per mm^{2}.

=== Flowers ===
The mature flowers of E. paranapanemensis are pale yellow, with oval-shaped petals that widen from the base toward the rounded tips. The petals can be between 4.5–5.5 mm (0.18–0.22 in) in length and 3–4 mm (0.12–0.16 in) in width, and are smooth on both the underside and topside. The bulbous uppermost part of the flower stem (hypanthium) is also smooth and covered with long soft hairs. Attached to the hypanthium are four calyx lobes that which resemble smaller leaves under the yellow petals. The calyx lobes are oblong and between 2.2–4 mm (0.087–0.16 in) in length and 1–3 mm in width. The centre of the mature flower forms a squared ring of many stamens that is darker in colour than the petals.

The flowers grow in pairs, appearing both at the end of the branch and shooting from the sides of the branch. The small stalks which attach the flower head to the branch (pedicels) are 1mm thick and 9.5–20 mm (0.4–0.8 in) in length. The pedicels may be slightly flattened and are covered with fine soft hairs that appear brown.

=== Fruits ===
The fruits of E. paranapanemensis are fleshy berries, round and squat (shaped roughly like a small pumpkin), and are 15–26 mm (0.59–1.0 in) in diameter. The fruits are a yellow-amber colour when ripe, and their surface texture is smooth and shiny. Each fruit contains up to six seeds measuring between 7–13 mm (0.3–0.5 in) in length and 6–10 mm (0.2–0.4 in) in width. The fruit flavour is similar to that of the Brazilian cherry (Eugenia uniflora).

=== Bark ===
The bark of an E. paranapanemensis tree is pale brown to grey in colour, and has a rough texture with ridges and furrows. The bark appears to peel away from the trunk in papery sheets.

== Habitat and ecology ==
Eugenia paranapanemensis is found in semideciduous forests at an altitude around 630m. E. paranapanemensis is found in a humid sub-tropical climate where the mean annual temperature is 18 °C (64 °F), and with moderate rainfall.

Several native bird species have been observed feeding on the fruits of E. paranapanemensis, and it is proposed that the seeds are dispersed by birds. This process of dispersal is known as endozoochory, where fruits are ingested by birds (or animals) and the undigested seeds are deposited later along with the faecal matter. Notably, the bird Penelope superciliaris (or Rusty-margined Guan) has been observed to be feeding on the fruits, which is a species formally categorised as Near Threatened and decreasing in population.

Eugenia paranapanemensis is known to flower in August (the winter season in Brazil) and fruits have been observed in both August and October (winter to spring in Brazil).

== Distribution ==
E. paranapanemensis is native to Southeast Brazil and known to occur in the Mata Atântica rainforest in São Paulo state in a humid sub-tropical climate. The area of occurrence is estimated at only 4 km^{2} (1.5 sq mi).

== Additional information ==
Although E. paranapanemensis has not been officially assessed its limited distribution and range along with threats to its habitat suggests that it could be a critically endangered species.
