= Eugenia pisiformis =

Conservation status
- Least Concern (IUCN 3.1)

Scientific classification
- Kingdom: Plantae
- Clade: Tracheophytes
- Clade: Angiosperms
- Clade: Eudicots
- Clade: Rosids
- Order: Myrtales
- Family: Myrtaceae
- Genus: Eugenia
- Species: E. pisiformis

Binomial name
- Eugenia pisiformis Cambess.

Synonyms
- Eugenia microcarpa O.Berg; Eugenia sericea O.Berg; Eugenia sericea var. angustifolia O.Berg; Eugenia sericea var. robusta O.Berg; Eugenia tinguyensis Cambess.; Eugenia vicozensis O.Berg; Eugenia vicozensis var. glabrata O.Berg; Eugenia vicozensis var. sericea O.Berg

Species of flowering plant

Eugenia pisiformis is a species of flowering plant in the family Myrtaceae. It is a tree endemic to eastern and southern Brazil. It grows in evergreen and semi-deciduous Atlantic Forest and restinga (coastal forests on sand).

The species was described by Jacques Cambessèdes in 1832.
