= Eugenia horizontalis =

Conservation status
- Vulnerable (IUCN 2.3)

Scientific classification
- Kingdom: Plantae
- Clade: Tracheophytes
- Clade: Angiosperms
- Clade: Eudicots
- Clade: Rosids
- Order: Myrtales
- Family: Myrtaceae
- Genus: Eugenia
- Species: E. horizontalis

Binomial name
- Eugenia horizontalis Pancher ex Brongn. & Gris

Synonyms
- Austromyrtus horizontalis (Pancher ex Brongn. & Gris) Burret; Myrtus aemulans Schltr.

Species of flowering plant

Eugenia horizontalis is a species of flowering plant in the family Myrtaceae. It is a shrub or tree endemic to New Caledonia. It grows in sclerophyllous woodlands.
