= Eugenia brownei =

Conservation status
- Vulnerable (IUCN 2.3)

Scientific classification
- Kingdom: Plantae
- Clade: Tracheophytes
- Clade: Angiosperms
- Clade: Eudicots
- Clade: Rosids
- Order: Myrtales
- Family: Myrtaceae
- Genus: Eugenia
- Species: E. brownei

Binomial name
- Eugenia brownei Urb.

Species of flowering plant

Eugenia brownei is a species of flowering plant in the family Myrtaceae. It is a shrub or tree endemic to southwestern Jamaica. It is known only from Saint Elizabeth Parish, where it grows along riverbanks near sea level. The IUCN Red List assesses the species as Vulnerable.

The species was described by Ignatz Urban in 1922.
