= Eugenia aboukirensis =

Conservation status
- Critically Endangered (IUCN 2.3)

Scientific classification
- Kingdom: Plantae
- Clade: Tracheophytes
- Clade: Angiosperms
- Clade: Eudicots
- Clade: Rosids
- Order: Myrtales
- Family: Myrtaceae
- Genus: Eugenia
- Species: E. aboukirensis

Binomial name
- Eugenia aboukirensis Proctor

Species of flowering plant

Eugenia aboukirensis is a species of plant in the family Myrtaceae. It is endemic to Jamaica, and was first published in J. Arnold Arbor. 63: 273 (1982).
