= Eugenia noumeensis =

Conservation status
- Vulnerable (IUCN 2.3)

Scientific classification
- Kingdom: Plantae
- Clade: Tracheophytes
- Clade: Angiosperms
- Clade: Eudicots
- Clade: Rosids
- Order: Myrtales
- Family: Myrtaceae
- Genus: Eugenia
- Species: E. noumeensis

Binomial name
- Eugenia noumeensis Guillaumin

Species of flowering plant

Eugenia noumeensis is a species of flowering plant in the family Myrtaceae. It is a shrub or tree endemic to New Caledonia. It grows in sclerophyllous forest. It is threatened by habitat loss from fires, livestock grazing, and expansion of agriculture.

The species was described by André Guillaumin in 1939.
