= Eugenia schunkei =

Conservation status
- Endangered (IUCN 3.1)

Scientific classification
- Kingdom: Plantae
- Clade: Tracheophytes
- Clade: Angiosperms
- Clade: Eudicots
- Clade: Rosids
- Order: Myrtales
- Family: Myrtaceae
- Genus: Eugenia
- Species: E. schunkei

Binomial name
- Eugenia schunkei McVaugh

Species of plant

Eugenia schunkei, commonly known as guayabilla, is a species of flowering plant in the family Myrtaceae. It is a tree native to Ecuador and Peru. It grows in frequently inundated alluvial lowland and montane Amazon rainforest from 100 to 2,378 metres elevation.
