= Eugenia pachychlamys =

Conservation status
- Vulnerable (IUCN 3.1)

Scientific classification
- Kingdom: Plantae
- Clade: Tracheophytes
- Clade: Angiosperms
- Clade: Eudicots
- Clade: Rosids
- Order: Myrtales
- Family: Myrtaceae
- Genus: Eugenia
- Species: E. pachychlamys

Binomial name
- Eugenia pachychlamys Donn.Sm.

Synonyms
- Eugenia chiquimulana Standl. & Steyerm.; Eugenia skutchii C.V.Morton & Standl.

Species of flowering plant

Eugenia pachychlamys is a species of flowering plant in the family Myrtaceae. It is a shrub or tree native to El Salvador and Guatemala. It is threatened by habitat loss.
