= Eugenia kellyana =

Conservation status
- Critically Endangered (IUCN 3.1)

Scientific classification
- Kingdom: Plantae
- Clade: Tracheophytes
- Clade: Angiosperms
- Clade: Eudicots
- Clade: Rosids
- Order: Myrtales
- Family: Myrtaceae
- Genus: Eugenia
- Species: E. kellyana

Binomial name
- Eugenia kellyana Proctor

Species of flowering plant

Eugenia kellyana is a species of flowering plant in the family Myrtaceae. It is a shrub or tree endemic to Jamaica.
