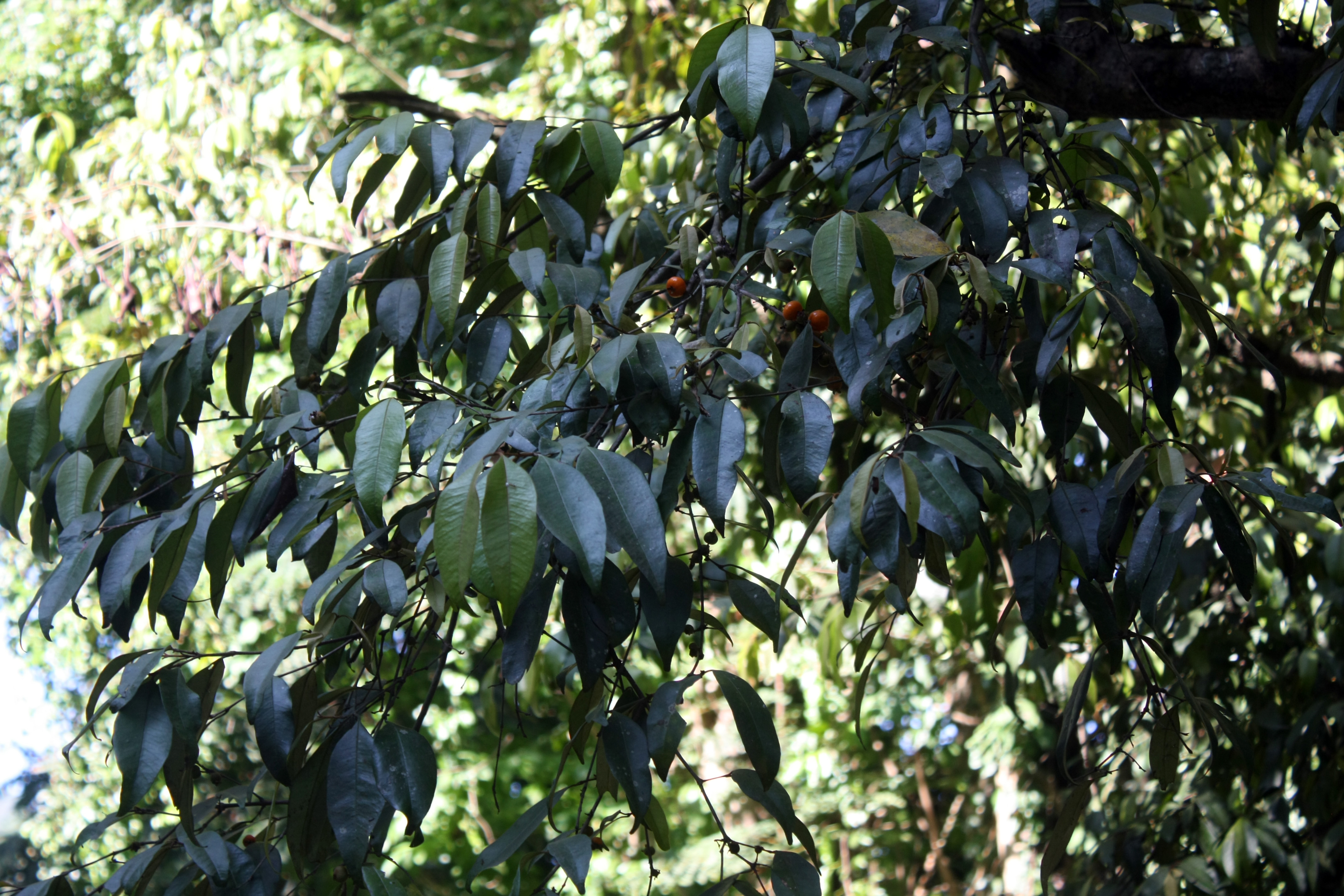

Conservation status
- Vulnerable (IUCN 2.3)

Scientific classification
- Kingdom: Plantae
- Clade: Tracheophytes
- Clade: Angiosperms
- Clade: Eudicots
- Clade: Rosids
- Order: Myrtales
- Family: Myrtaceae
- Genus: Eugenia
- Species: E. rufofulva

Binomial name
- Eugenia rufofulva Thwaites

= Eugenia rufofulva =

Species of flowering plant

Eugenia rufofulva is a species of flowering plant in the family Myrtaceae. It is a tree endemic to western Sri Lanka.

The species was described by George Henry Kendrick Thwaites in 1864.
