= Eugenia umbellulifera =

Conservation status
- Least Concern (IUCN 3.1)

Scientific classification
- Kingdom: Plantae
- Clade: Tracheophytes
- Clade: Angiosperms
- Clade: Eudicots
- Clade: Rosids
- Order: Myrtales
- Family: Myrtaceae
- Genus: Eugenia
- Species: E. umbellulifera

Binomial name
- Eugenia umbellulifera (Kunth) Krug & Urb.

Synonyms
- Anamomis esculenta (O.Berg) Griseb.; Anamomis umbellulifera (Kunth) Britton; Eugenia esculenta O.Berg; Myrcia umbellulifera (Kunth) DC.; Myrcianthes krugii Kiaersk.; Myrcianthes umbellulifera (Kunth) Alain; Myrtus erythroxyloides Kunth; Myrtus umbellulifera Kunth; Pseudanamomis umbellulifera (Kunth) Kausel

Species of flowering plant

Eugenia umbellulifera is a species of flowering plant in the family Myrtaceae. It is a shrub or tree native to Colombia, Venezuela, Guyana, and Trinidad. It grows in dry forests, shrublands, and woody thickets on steep slopes of coastal hills and granite outcrops from 10 to 850 metres elevation. It has been introduced to the Dominican Republic, Netherlands Antilles, Puerto Rico, and Venezuelan Antilles.
