= Eugenia leonorae =

Conservation status
- Critically Endangered (IUCN 2.3)

Scientific classification
- Kingdom: Plantae
- Clade: Tracheophytes
- Clade: Angiosperms
- Clade: Eudicots
- Clade: Rosids
- Order: Myrtales
- Family: Myrtaceae
- Genus: Eugenia
- Species: E. leonorae

Binomial name
- Eugenia leonorae Mattos

Synonyms
- Calycorectes schottianus O.Berg

Species of flowering plant

Eugenia leonorae is a species of flowering plant in the family Myrtaceae. It is a tree endemic to the Atlantic Forest of Rio de Janeiro to Paraná states in southeastern and southern Brazil.
