= Eugenia colipensis =

Conservation status
- Endangered (IUCN 3.1)

Scientific classification
- Kingdom: Plantae
- Clade: Tracheophytes
- Clade: Angiosperms
- Clade: Eudicots
- Clade: Rosids
- Order: Myrtales
- Family: Myrtaceae
- Genus: Eugenia
- Species: E. colipensis

Binomial name
- Eugenia colipensis O.Berg

Species of flowering plant

Eugenia colipensis is a species of flowering plant in the family Myrtaceae. It is a shrub or tree endemic to the state of Veracruz in eastern Mexico. It grows in tall evergreen lowland and lower montane rain forests from sea level to 1,300 metres elevation.
