= Eugenia guanabarina =

Conservation status
- Least Concern (IUCN 3.1)

Scientific classification
- Kingdom: Plantae
- Clade: Tracheophytes
- Clade: Angiosperms
- Clade: Eudicots
- Clade: Rosids
- Order: Myrtales
- Family: Myrtaceae
- Genus: Eugenia
- Species: E. guanabarina

Binomial name
- Eugenia guanabarina (Mattos & D.Legrand) Giaretta & M.C.Souza

Synonyms
- Calycorectes teixeireanus Mattos; Chytraculia bergiana Kuntze; Eugenia teixeireana (Mattos) Mattos; Marlierea guanabarina Mattos & D.Legrand; Mitranthes langsdorffii O.Berg; Neomitranthes langsdorffii (O.Berg) Mattos

Species of flowering plant

Eugenia guanabarina is a species of flowering plant in the family Myrtaceae. It is a tree endemic to eastern Brazil. It is known from the states of Bahia, Espírito Santo, and Rio de Janeiro, where it grows in lowland moist evergreen Atlantic Forest.
