= Eugenia jutiapensis =

Conservation status
- Endangered (IUCN 3.1)

Scientific classification
- Kingdom: Plantae
- Clade: Tracheophytes
- Clade: Angiosperms
- Clade: Eudicots
- Clade: Rosids
- Order: Myrtales
- Family: Myrtaceae
- Genus: Eugenia
- Species: E. jutiapensis

Binomial name
- Eugenia jutiapensis Stand. & Steyerm.

Species of plant

Eugenia jutiapensis is a species of flowering plant in the family Myrtaceae. It is found in El Salvador and Guatemala. It is threatened by habitat loss.
