= Eugenia wurdackii =

Conservation status
- Critically Endangered (IUCN 3.1)

Scientific classification
- Kingdom: Plantae
- Clade: Tracheophytes
- Clade: Angiosperms
- Clade: Eudicots
- Clade: Rosids
- Order: Myrtales
- Family: Myrtaceae
- Genus: Eugenia
- Species: E. wurdackii

Binomial name
- Eugenia wurdackii (McVaugh) Mattos

Synonyms
- Calycorectes wurdackii McVaugh

Species of plant

Eugenia wurdackii is a species of flowering plant in the family Myrtaceae. It is a tree endemic to northeastern Peru. It grows up to 25 metres tall. It is native to a small area along the banks of the Santiago River in Amazonas Department, near the Santiago-Comaina Reserved Zone, where it grows in lowland Amazon rainforest from 300 to 350 metres elevation. The species is threatened by habitat loss from deforestation caused by gold mining.

The species was first described as Calycorectes wurdackii by Rogers McVaugh in 1969. In 2005 Joáo Rodrigues de Mattos placed the species in genus Eugenia as E. wurdackii.
