= Eugenia discifera =

Conservation status
- Endangered (IUCN 2.3)

Scientific classification
- Kingdom: Plantae
- Clade: Embryophytes
- Clade: Tracheophytes
- Clade: Spermatophytes
- Clade: Angiosperms
- Clade: Eudicots
- Clade: Rosids
- Order: Myrtales
- Family: Myrtaceae
- Genus: Eugenia
- Species: E. discifera

Binomial name
- Eugenia discifera Gamble

Species of flowering plant

Eugenia discifera is a species of tree in the family Myrtaceae. It is endemic to Kerala and Tamil Nadu in southwestern India. It is threatened by habitat loss. It favors the wet, tropical biome.

The species was described by James Sykes Gamble in 1918.
