= Eugenia mackeeana =

Conservation status
- Vulnerable (IUCN 2.3)

Scientific classification
- Kingdom: Plantae
- Clade: Tracheophytes
- Clade: Angiosperms
- Clade: Eudicots
- Clade: Rosids
- Order: Myrtales
- Family: Myrtaceae
- Genus: Eugenia
- Species: E. mackeeana

Binomial name
- Eugenia mackeeana Guillaumin

Species of flowering plant

Eugenia mackeeana is a species of flowering plant in the family Myrtaceae. It is a shrub or tree endemic to New Caledonia.

The species was described by André Guillaumin in 1959.
