= Eugenia daenikeri =

Conservation status
- Endangered (IUCN 3.1)

Scientific classification
- Kingdom: Plantae
- Clade: Tracheophytes
- Clade: Angiosperms
- Clade: Eudicots
- Clade: Rosids
- Order: Myrtales
- Family: Myrtaceae
- Genus: Eugenia
- Species: E. daenikeri

Binomial name
- Eugenia daenikeri Guillaumin

Species of flowering plant

Eugenia daenikeri is a species of plant in the family Myrtaceae, endemic to New Caledonia.
