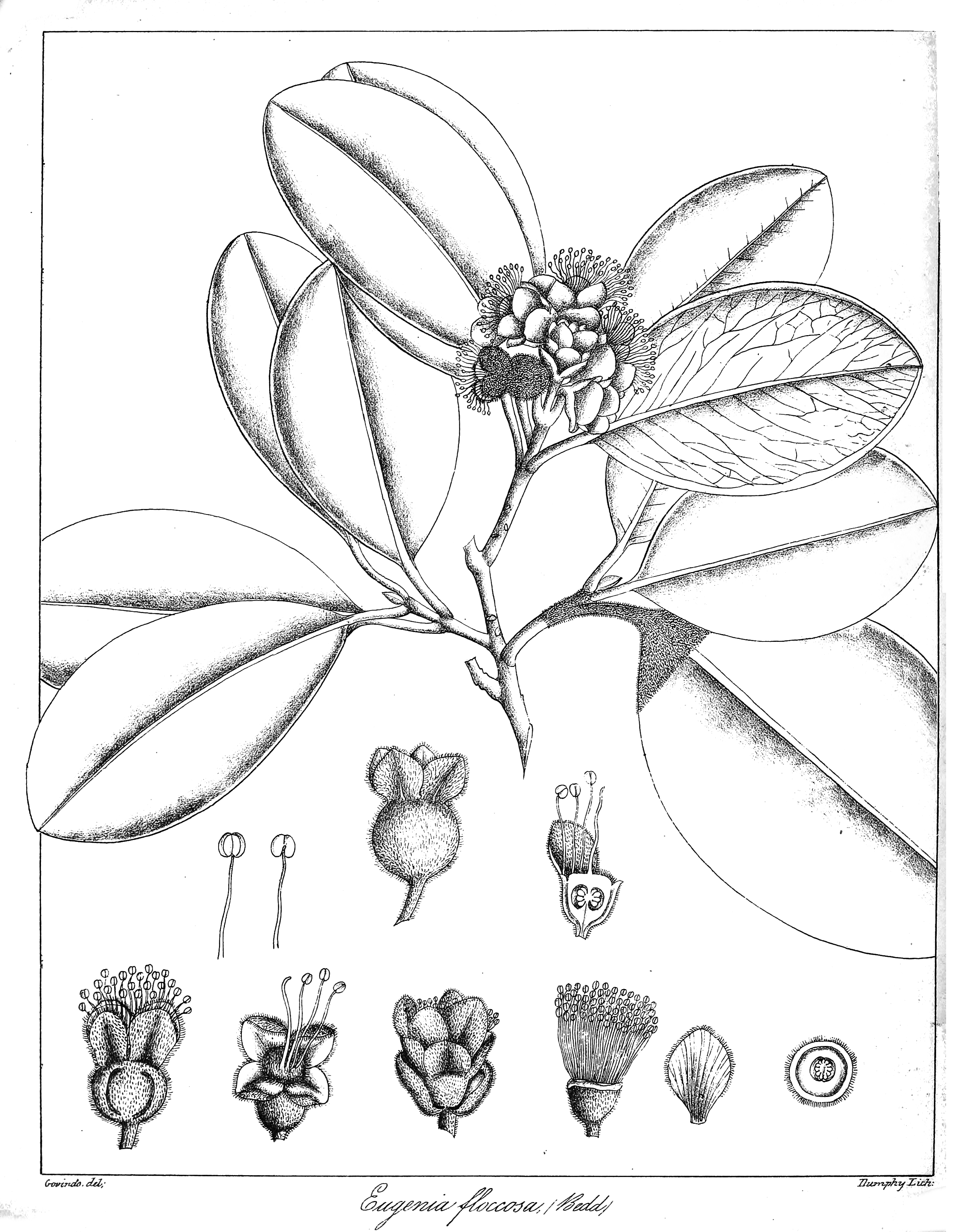

Conservation status
- Endangered (IUCN 2.3)

Scientific classification
- Kingdom: Plantae
- Clade: Tracheophytes
- Clade: Angiosperms
- Clade: Eudicots
- Clade: Rosids
- Order: Myrtales
- Family: Myrtaceae
- Genus: Eugenia
- Species: E. floccosa

Binomial name
- Eugenia floccosa Bedd.

= Eugenia floccosa =

Species of flowering plant

Eugenia floccosa is a species of plant in the family Myrtaceae. It is a tree endemic to the Agastyamalai Hills of Tamil Nadu state in southern India. It is threatened by habitat loss.
