= Eugenia valvata =

Conservation status
- Near Threatened (IUCN 3.1)

Scientific classification
- Kingdom: Plantae
- Clade: Tracheophytes
- Clade: Angiosperms
- Clade: Eudicots
- Clade: Rosids
- Order: Myrtales
- Family: Myrtaceae
- Genus: Eugenia
- Species: E. valvata

Binomial name
- Eugenia valvata McVaugh

Species of flowering plant

Eugenia valvata is a species of plant in the family Myrtaceae. It is a shrub or tree endemic to Ecuador.
