= Eugenia valsuganana =

Conservation status
- Endangered (IUCN 3.1)

Scientific classification
- Kingdom: Plantae
- Clade: Tracheophytes
- Clade: Angiosperms
- Clade: Eudicots
- Clade: Rosids
- Order: Myrtales
- Family: Myrtaceae
- Genus: Eugenia
- Species: E. valsuganana

Binomial name
- Eugenia valsuganana Sobral

Species of tree in the myrtle family

Eugenia valsuganana is a species of plant in the family Myrtaceae. It is endemic to the municipality of Santa Teresa, Espírito Santo, Brazil, and was first described in 2010. The tree grows to between 4 and 7 metres (13 and 23 ft) tall, and produces edible yellow fruit that are 16–20 mm (0.63–0.79 in) in diameter.
