= Eugenia virotii =

Conservation status
- Endangered (IUCN 3.1)

Scientific classification
- Kingdom: Plantae
- Clade: Tracheophytes
- Clade: Angiosperms
- Clade: Eudicots
- Clade: Rosids
- Order: Myrtales
- Family: Myrtaceae
- Genus: Eugenia
- Species: E. virotii

Binomial name
- Eugenia virotii Guillaumin

Species of flowering plant

Eugenia virotii is a species of plant in the family Myrtaceae. It is endemic to New Caledonia.
