= Eugenia aceitillo =

Conservation status
- Least Concern (IUCN 3.1)

Scientific classification
- Kingdom: Plantae
- Clade: Tracheophytes
- Clade: Angiosperms
- Clade: Eudicots
- Clade: Rosids
- Order: Myrtales
- Family: Myrtaceae
- Genus: Eugenia
- Species: E. aceitillo

Binomial name
- Eugenia aceitillo Urb.

Species of flowering plant

Eugenia aceitillo is a species of flowering plant in the family Myrtaceae. It is a shrub or tree endemic to eastern Cuba. It is threatened by habitat loss.
