= Eugenia longicuspis =

Conservation status
- Endangered (IUCN 3.1)

Scientific classification
- Kingdom: Plantae
- Clade: Tracheophytes
- Clade: Angiosperms
- Clade: Eudicots
- Clade: Rosids
- Order: Myrtales
- Family: Myrtaceae
- Genus: Eugenia
- Species: E. longicuspis

Binomial name
- Eugenia longicuspis McVaugh

Species of plant

Eugenia longicuspis is a species of flowering plant in the family Myrtaceae. It is a tree endemic to northern Peru.
