= Eugenia calcadensis =

Conservation status
- Endangered (IUCN 3.1)

Scientific classification
- Kingdom: Plantae
- Clade: Tracheophytes
- Clade: Angiosperms
- Clade: Eudicots
- Clade: Rosids
- Order: Myrtales
- Family: Myrtaceae
- Genus: Eugenia
- Species: E. calcadensis

Binomial name
- Eugenia calcadensis Bedd.

Synonyms
- Syzygium calcadense (Bedd.) Chandrash.

Species of flowering plant

Eugenia calcadensis is a species of flowering plant in the family Myrtaceae. It is a tree endemic to southwestern India. It is a small evergreen tree which grows up to eight metres tall. It is known from the Agasthyamalai hills and Periyar in the southern Western Ghats of Kerala and Tamil Nadu states. It grows in moist evergreen forests from 300 to 1,100 metres elevation.
