= Eugenia acutissima =

Conservation status
- Extinct (IUCN 3.1)

Scientific classification
- Kingdom: Plantae
- Clade: Tracheophytes
- Clade: Angiosperms
- Clade: Eudicots
- Clade: Rosids
- Order: Myrtales
- Family: Myrtaceae
- Genus: Eugenia
- Species: †E. acutissima

Binomial name
- †Eugenia acutissima Urb. & Ekman

Extinct species of flowering plant

Eugenia acutissima was a species of plant in the family Myrtaceae. It was endemic to Cuba. It is now extinct.
