= Eugenia verdoorniae =

Conservation status
- Near Threatened (IUCN 3.1)

Scientific classification
- Kingdom: Plantae
- Clade: Tracheophytes
- Clade: Angiosperms
- Clade: Eudicots
- Clade: Rosids
- Order: Myrtales
- Family: Myrtaceae
- Genus: Eugenia
- Species: E. verdoorniae

Binomial name
- Eugenia verdoorniae A.E.van Wyk

Species of flowering plant

Eugenia verdoorniae is a species of flowering plant in the family Myrtaceae. It a shrub or tree native to the Cape Provinces and KwaZulu-Natal in South Africa. It is threatened by habitat loss.
