= Eugenia harrisii =

Conservation status
- Vulnerable (IUCN 3.1)

Scientific classification
- Kingdom: Plantae
- Clade: Tracheophytes
- Clade: Angiosperms
- Clade: Eudicots
- Clade: Rosids
- Order: Myrtales
- Family: Myrtaceae
- Genus: Eugenia
- Species: E. harrisii

Binomial name
- Eugenia harrisii Krug & Urb.

Synonyms
- Eugenia crenata O.Berg, nom. illeg. homonym. post.; Eugenia harrisii var. grandifolia Krug & Urb.

Species of flowering plant

Eugenia harrisii is a species of flowering plant in the family Myrtaceae. It is a shrub or tree up to 5 metres tall. It is endemic to Jamaica, where it is known from the parishes of St. Ann, Portland, St. Thomas, St. Andrew, St. Catherine, and Manchester. It grows in dry limestone forests, moist limestone forests, and moist montane forests from 28 to about 1,500 metres elevation. It is threatened by habitat loss.
