= Eugenia hastilis =

Conservation status
- Critically Endangered (IUCN 2.3)

Scientific classification
- Kingdom: Plantae
- Clade: Tracheophytes
- Clade: Angiosperms
- Clade: Eudicots
- Clade: Rosids
- Order: Myrtales
- Family: Myrtaceae
- Genus: Eugenia
- Species: E. hastilis

Binomial name
- Eugenia hastilis Gueho & A.J. Scott

Species of flowering plant

Eugenia hastilis is a species of plant in the family Myrtaceae. It is endemic to Mauritius. Its natural habitat is subtropical or tropical dry forests.
