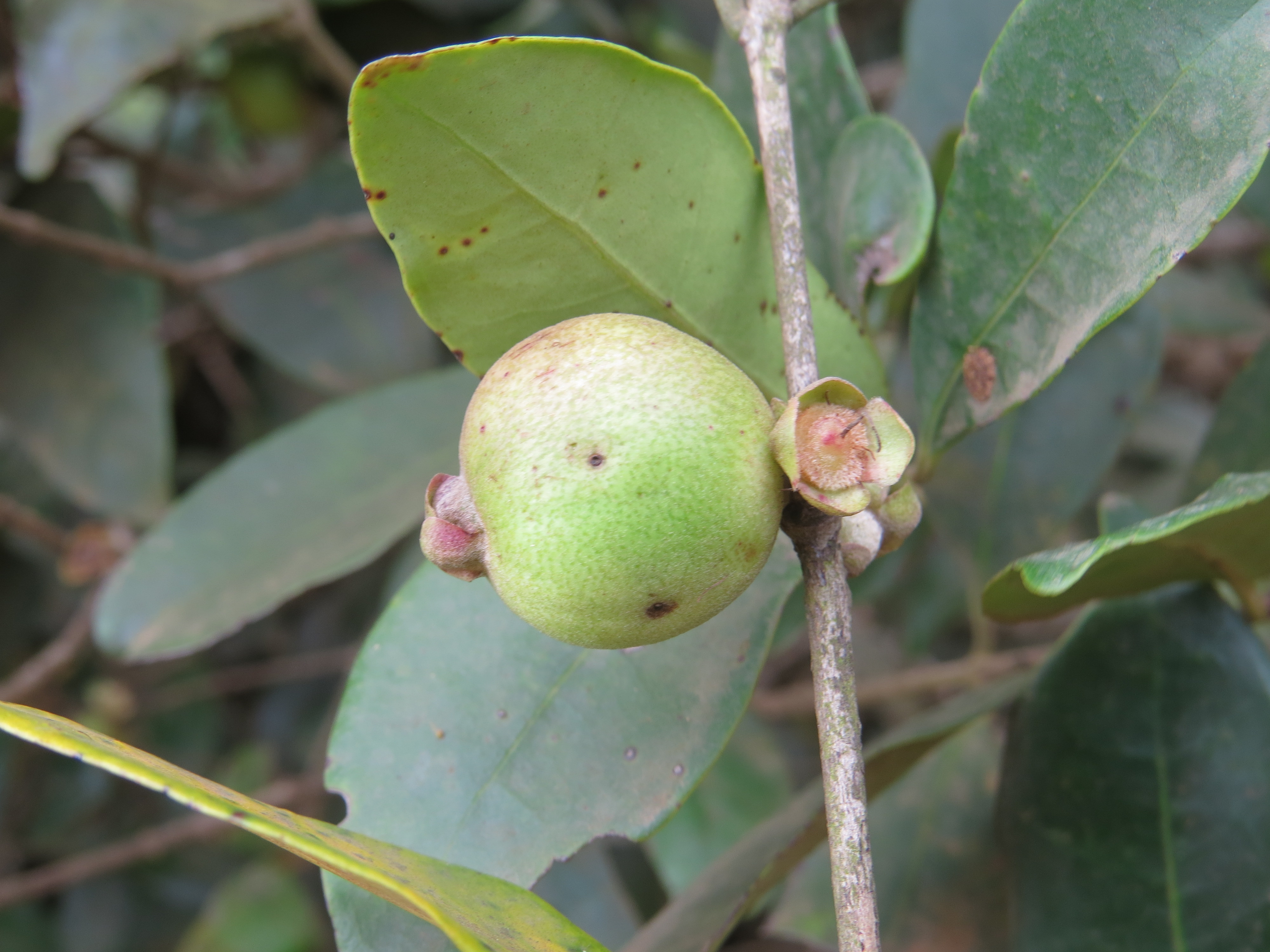

Conservation status
- Endangered (IUCN 2.3)

Scientific classification
- Kingdom: Plantae
- Clade: Tracheophytes
- Clade: Angiosperms
- Clade: Eudicots
- Clade: Rosids
- Order: Myrtales
- Family: Myrtaceae
- Genus: Eugenia
- Species: E. codyensis

Binomial name
- Eugenia codyensis Munro ex Wight

Synonyms
- Eugenia codyensis var. obovata Rijuraj, Rajendrapr., Shareef & Shaju; Eugenia cotinifolia subsp. codyensis (Munro ex Wight) P.S.Ashton; Eugenia hypoleuca Thwaites ex Kosterm.; Eugenia memecylifolia Talbot; Syzygium codyense (Munro ex Wight) Chandrash.

= Eugenia codyensis =

Species of flowering plant

Eugenia hypoleuca is a species of flowering plant in the family Myrtaceae. It is a shrub native to western India and Sri Lanka.
