= Eugenia vattimoana =

Conservation status
- Critically Endangered (IUCN 3.1)

Scientific classification
- Kingdom: Plantae
- Clade: Tracheophytes
- Clade: Angiosperms
- Clade: Eudicots
- Clade: Rosids
- Order: Myrtales
- Family: Myrtaceae
- Genus: Eugenia
- Species: E. vattimoana

Binomial name
- Eugenia vattimoana Mattos

Synonyms
- Calycorectes sellowianus O.Berg

Species of flowering plant

Eugenia vattimoana is a species of flowering plant in the family Myrtaceae. It is a tree native to the states of Espírito Santo and Rio de Janeiro in southeastern Brazil. It is a small tree, up to 8 metres tall, which grows in lowland and montane moist Atlantic Forest. It is known from Tijuca National Park, where it is threatened by habitat loss and fragmentation from road building, urban expansion, and invasive species. In northern Rio de Janeiro and southern Espírito Santo states it is threatened by urbanization, agricultural expansion, and tourism development. The IUCN Red List assesses the species as Critically Endangered.
