= Eugenia mozomboensis =

Conservation status
- Critically Endangered (IUCN 3.1)

Scientific classification
- Kingdom: Plantae
- Clade: Tracheophytes
- Clade: Angiosperms
- Clade: Eudicots
- Clade: Rosids
- Order: Myrtales
- Family: Myrtaceae
- Genus: Eugenia
- Species: E. mozomboensis

Binomial name
- Eugenia mozomboensis P.E.Sánchez

Species of tree

Eugenia mozomboensis is a species of flowering plant in the family Myrtaceae. It is a shrub endemic to Veracruz state, in eastern Mexico. It is a critically endangered species, threatened by habitat loss.
