= Eugenia macrocarpa =

Conservation status
- Least Concern (IUCN 3.1)

Scientific classification
- Kingdom: Plantae
- Clade: Tracheophytes
- Clade: Angiosperms
- Clade: Eudicots
- Clade: Rosids
- Order: Myrtales
- Family: Myrtaceae
- Genus: Eugenia
- Species: E. macrocarpa

Binomial name
- Eugenia macrocarpa Schltdl. & Cham.

Synonyms
- Eugenia americana Jacob-Makoy ex É.Morren; Eugenia macrocarpa Cham. & Schltdl., nom. illeg. homonym. post.; Eugenia mexicana Steud.; Pseudanamomis macrocarpa (Schltdl. & Cham.) Bisse

Species of tree

Eugenia macrocarpa, commonly known as huesillo, is a species of flowering plant in the family Myrtaceae. It is a shrub or tree endemic to Veracruz and neighboring states in eastern Mexico. It is typically a shrub 2 to 4 meters tall, and sometimes a small tree 6 to 15 meters tall. It grows in lowland and montane tropical moist forest from sea level near the Gulf of Mexico up to 1,400 metres elevation in the Sierra Madre Oriental.
