= Eugenia crassicaulis =

Conservation status
- Endangered (IUCN 2.3)

Scientific classification
- Kingdom: Plantae
- Clade: Embryophytes
- Clade: Tracheophytes
- Clade: Angiosperms
- Clade: Eudicots
- Clade: Rosids
- Order: Myrtales
- Family: Myrtaceae
- Genus: Eugenia
- Species: E. crassicaulis

Binomial name
- Eugenia crassicaulis Proctor

Species of flowering plant

Eugenia crassicaulis is a species of plant in the family Myrtaceae. It is endemic to Portland Parish, Jamaica. It grows as a shrub or small tree, and can be found primarily in wet tropical areas. The biggest threat to its survival is habitat loss.
