= Eugenia sulcivenia =

Conservation status
- Endangered (IUCN 2.3)

Scientific classification
- Kingdom: Plantae
- Clade: Tracheophytes
- Clade: Angiosperms
- Clade: Eudicots
- Clade: Rosids
- Order: Myrtales
- Family: Myrtaceae
- Genus: Eugenia
- Species: E. sulcivenia

Binomial name
- Eugenia sulcivenia Krug & Urb.

Species of flowering plant

Eugenia sulcivenia is a species of flowering plant in the family Myrtaceae. It is a shrub or tree endemic to southeastern Jamaica. It is threatened by habitat loss.
