= Eugenia mooniana =

Scientific classification
- Kingdom: Plantae
- Clade: Tracheophytes
- Clade: Angiosperms
- Clade: Eudicots
- Clade: Rosids
- Order: Myrtales
- Family: Myrtaceae
- Genus: Eugenia
- Species: E. mooniana

Binomial name
- Eugenia mooniana Wight

Synonyms
- Eugenia concinna Thwaites [Illegitimate]; Eugenia gracilis Bedd.; Eugenia thwaitesii Duthie

Species of flowering plant

Eugenia mooniana, is a species of plant in the family Myrtaceae which is native to Western Ghats of India and Sri Lanka.

It is an 8 m (26 ft) tall tree with terete branchlets. Leaves are simple, opposite; lamina elliptic to narrow elliptic; apex caudate-acuminate with blunt tip; base acute to rounded with entire margin. Flowers are white colored. Fruit is a globose, glabrous, single-seeded berry. Flowering starts from October and ends in December. The plant is known as pinibaru by Sinhalese people in Sri Lanka.
