= Eugenia eperforata =

Conservation status
- Endangered (IUCN 2.3)

Scientific classification
- Kingdom: Plantae
- Clade: Tracheophytes
- Clade: Angiosperms
- Clade: Eudicots
- Clade: Rosids
- Order: Myrtales
- Family: Myrtaceae
- Genus: Eugenia
- Species: E. eperforata

Binomial name
- Eugenia eperforata Urb.

Species of flowering plant

Eugenia eperforata is a species of flowering plant in the family Myrtaceae. It is a tree endemic to Saint Ann Parish in Jamaica.
