= Eugenia terpnophylla =

Conservation status
- Endangered (IUCN 2.3)

Scientific classification
- Kingdom: Plantae
- Clade: Tracheophytes
- Clade: Angiosperms
- Clade: Eudicots
- Clade: Rosids
- Order: Myrtales
- Family: Myrtaceae
- Genus: Eugenia
- Species: E. terpnophylla

Binomial name
- Eugenia terpnophylla Thwaites

Varieties
- Eugenia terpnophylla var. keralensis Shareef, E.S.S.Kumar & P.E.Roy; Eugenia terpnophylla var. terpnophylla

Species of flowering plant

Eugenia terpnophylla is a species of flowering plant in the family Myrtaceae. It is a shrub or tree native to Kerala state of southern India and to Sri Lanka.

Two varieties are accepted.

- Eugenia terpnophylla var. keralensis Shareef, E.S.S.Kumar & P.E.Roy – Kerala
- Eugenia terpnophylla var. terpnophylla – Kerala and Sri Lanka
