= Eugenia rivulorum =

Conservation status
- Vulnerable (IUCN 2.3)

Scientific classification
- Kingdom: Plantae
- Clade: Tracheophytes
- Clade: Angiosperms
- Clade: Eudicots
- Clade: Rosids
- Order: Myrtales
- Family: Myrtaceae
- Genus: Eugenia
- Species: E. rivulorum

Binomial name
- Eugenia rivulorum Thwaites

Species of flowering plant

Eugenia rivulorum is a species of plant in the family Myrtaceae. It is endemic to Sri Lanka.
