= Eugenia kaalensis =

Conservation status
- Vulnerable (IUCN 2.3)

Scientific classification
- Kingdom: Plantae
- Clade: Tracheophytes
- Clade: Angiosperms
- Clade: Eudicots
- Clade: Rosids
- Order: Myrtales
- Family: Myrtaceae
- Genus: Eugenia
- Species: E. kaalensis

Binomial name
- Eugenia kaalensis Guillaumin

Species of flowering plant

Eugenia kaalensis is a species of flowering plant in the family Myrtaceae. It is a shrub or tree endemic to New Caledonia. It is native to northwestern Grande Terre, where it grows in shrubland on ultramafic and serpentine substrates from 50 to 400 metres elevation.
