= Eugenia kameruniana =

Conservation status
- Critically Endangered (IUCN 3.1)

Scientific classification
- Kingdom: Plantae
- Clade: Tracheophytes
- Clade: Angiosperms
- Clade: Eudicots
- Clade: Rosids
- Order: Myrtales
- Family: Myrtaceae
- Genus: Eugenia
- Species: E. kameruniana

Binomial name
- Eugenia kameruniana Engl.

Synonyms
- Myrtus kameruniana (Engl.) Kuntze; Eugenia hankeana H.J.P.Winkl.

Species of flowering plant

Eugenia kameruniana is a species of plant in the family Myrtaceae. It is endemic to Cameroon. Its natural habitat is subtropical or tropical dry forests. It is threatened by habitat loss.
