= Eugenia sripadaense =

Conservation status
- Endangered (IUCN 2.3)

Scientific classification
- Kingdom: Plantae
- Clade: Tracheophytes
- Clade: Angiosperms
- Clade: Eudicots
- Clade: Rosids
- Order: Myrtales
- Family: Myrtaceae
- Genus: Eugenia
- Species: E. sripadaense

Binomial name
- Eugenia sripadaense Kosterm.

Species of flowering plant

Eugenia sripadaense is a species of flowering plant in the family Myrtaceae. It is a shrub or tree endemic to Sri Lanka.
