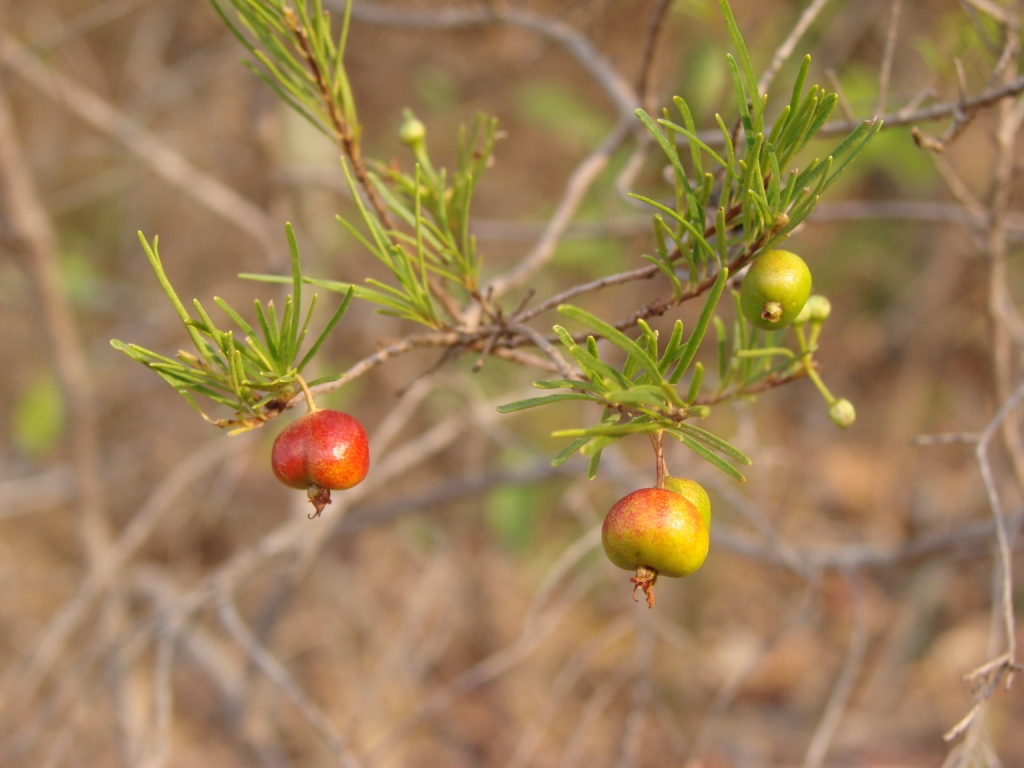

Conservation status
- Least Concern (IUCN 3.1)

Scientific classification
- Kingdom: Plantae
- Clade: Tracheophytes
- Clade: Angiosperms
- Clade: Eudicots
- Clade: Rosids
- Order: Myrtales
- Family: Myrtaceae
- Genus: Eugenia
- Species: E. angustissima

Binomial name
- Eugenia angustissima O.Berg (1859)

= Eugenia angustissima =

Species of plant

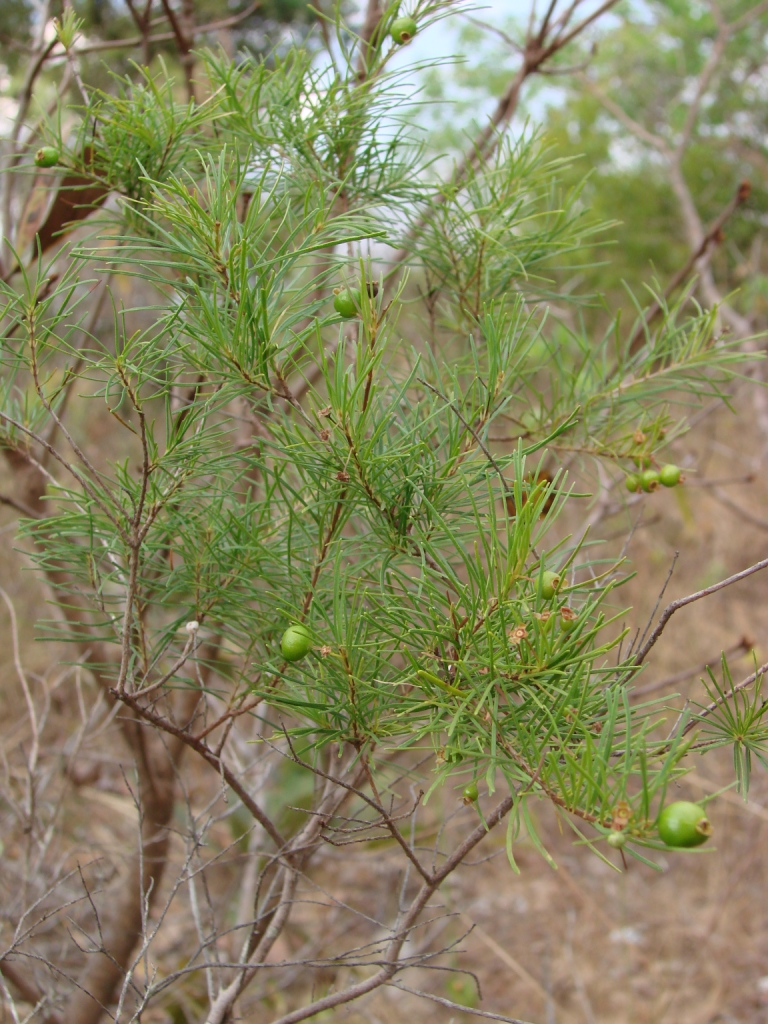
Eugenia angustissima plant with immature fruits

Eugenia angustissima, also known as very fine leafed cherry, cerejinha de folhas finíssimas, cereja de folhas finíssimas, guamirim folha de agulha, is a flowering shrub in the family Myrtaceae.

== Distribution ==
Eugenia angustissima is native to Bolivia, Paraguay and Brazil, mainly in the Cerrado and Caatinga regions, including but not exclusive to the states of Bahia, Goiás, São Paulo, Minas Gerais, Tocantins, Mato Grosso and Mato Grosso do Sul.
