= Eugenia amplifolia =

Conservation status
- Near Threatened (IUCN 2.3)

Scientific classification
- Kingdom: Plantae
- Clade: Tracheophytes
- Clade: Angiosperms
- Clade: Eudicots
- Clade: Rosids
- Order: Myrtales
- Family: Myrtaceae
- Genus: Eugenia
- Species: E. amplifolia

Binomial name
- Eugenia amplifolia Urb.

Species of flowering plant

Eugenia amplifolia is a species of flowering plant in the family Myrtaceae. It is a shrub or tree endemic to Jamaica. It grows on forested hillsides on limestone substrates.

The species was described by Ignatz Urban in 1908.
