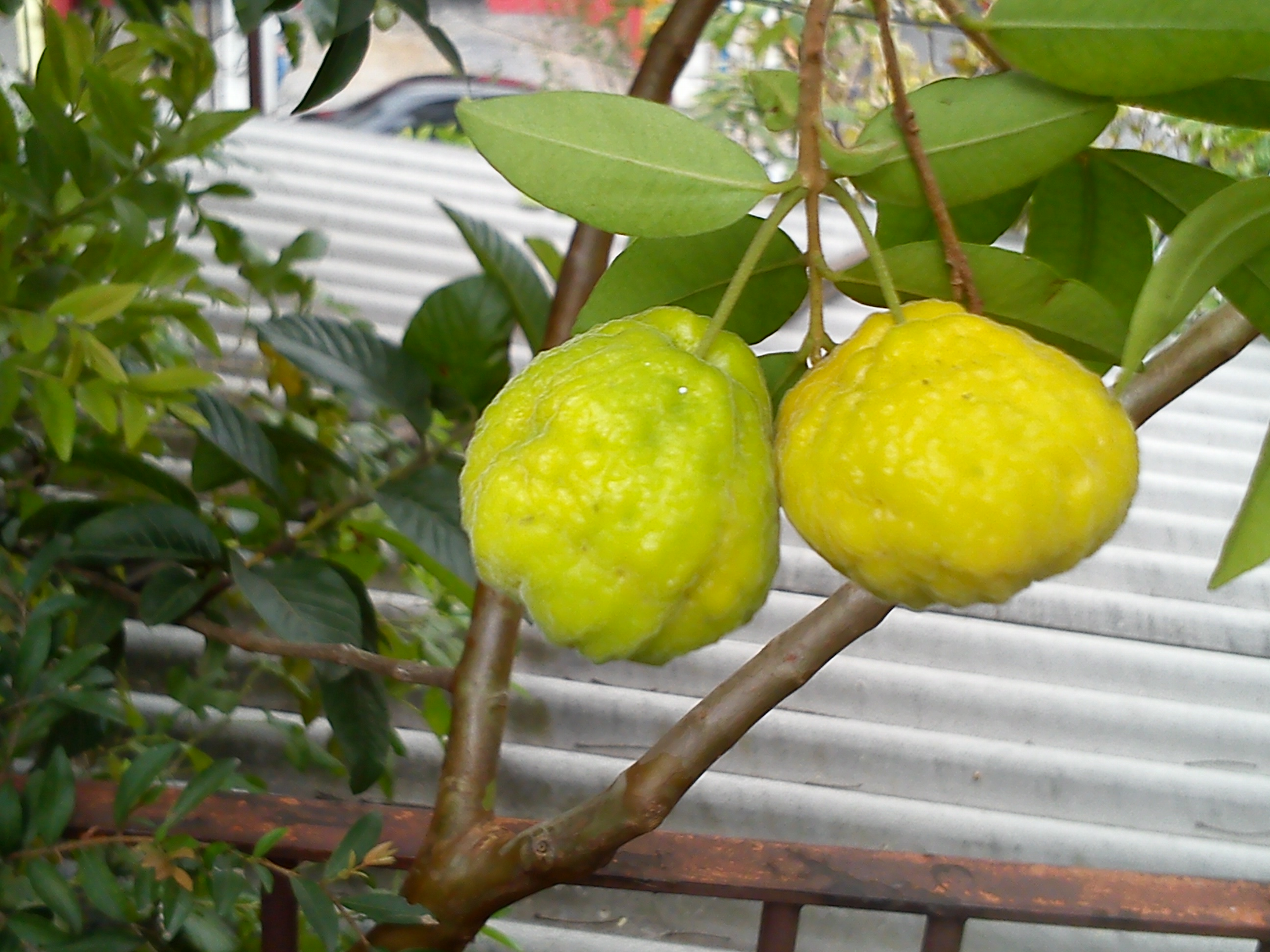

Conservation status
- Least Concern (IUCN 3.1)

Scientific classification
- Kingdom: Plantae
- Clade: Tracheophytes
- Clade: Angiosperms
- Clade: Eudicots
- Clade: Rosids
- Order: Myrtales
- Family: Myrtaceae
- Genus: Eugenia
- Species: E. pyriformis

Binomial name
- Eugenia pyriformis Cambess.

Synonyms
- List: Eugenia albotomentosa Cambess.; Eugenia albotomentosa var. goyazensis Cambess.; Eugenia albotomentosa var. urussangensis O.Berg; Eugenia conceptionis (Kuntze) K.Schum.; Eugenia dumicola Barb.Rodr.; Eugenia hassleriana Barb.Rodr.; Eugenia phlebotomonides Kiaersk.; Eugenia pyriformis var. argentea Mattos & D.Legrand; Eugenia pyriformis f. ponhi D.Legrand; Eugenia pyriformis var. uvalha (Cambess.) D.Legrand; Eugenia turbinata O.Berg; Eugenia uvalha Cambess.; Eugenia vauthiereana O.Berg; Eugenia viminalis O.Berg; Luma turbinata (O.Berg) Herter; Marlierea rosea Barb.Rodr.; Marlierea ternata Barb.Rodr.; Myrciaria dumicola (Barb.Rodr.) Chodat & Hassl.; Myrtus conceptionis Kuntze; Myrtus pyriformis (Cambess.) Parodi; Pseudomyrcianthes pyriformis (Cambess.) Kausel; Stenocalyx lanceolatus O.Berg

= Eugenia pyriformis =

Species of tree

Eugenia pyriformis is a species of flowering plant of the family Myrtaceae. It is a tree native to central and southern Brazil, Bolivia, Paraguay, and northeastern Argentina. It reaches 6 to 13 metres (20 to 43 ft) in height and 30 to 50 centimetres (0.98 to 1.64 ft) in trunk diameter. In Brazil it occurs primarily in the states of Paraná, Rio Grande do Sul, Santa Catarina and São Paulo.

== Cultivation ==
It may grow at elevations of between 300 and 1,500 metres (980 and 4,920 ft). It requires a well drained, preferably slightly acid soil.

== Fruit ==
Eugenia pyriformis flowers between the months of August and December, and produces fruit between September and January. The yellow fruit of the plant is called uvalha and is edible. Some environmentalists have recommended use of the plant for projects of reforestation in Brazil, especially in degraded areas and permanent nature preserves. The plant is also popular for ornamental or domestic purposes.
