= Eugenia rottleriana =

Conservation status
- Vulnerable (IUCN 2.3)

Scientific classification
- Kingdom: Plantae
- Clade: Tracheophytes
- Clade: Angiosperms
- Clade: Eudicots
- Clade: Rosids
- Order: Myrtales
- Family: Myrtaceae
- Genus: Eugenia
- Species: E. rottleriana

Binomial name
- Eugenia rottleriana Wight & Arn.

Species of flowering plant

Eugenia rottleriana is a species of plant in the family Myrtaceae. It is endemic to the southern Western Ghats of Kerala and Tamil Nadu states in southern India, where it grows in submontane evergreen forest.
