= Eugenia uxpanapensis =

Conservation status
- Endangered (IUCN 2.3)

Scientific classification
- Kingdom: Plantae
- Clade: Tracheophytes
- Clade: Angiosperms
- Clade: Eudicots
- Clade: Rosids
- Order: Myrtales
- Family: Myrtaceae
- Genus: Eugenia
- Species: E. uxpanapensis

Binomial name
- Eugenia uxpanapensis P.E. Sanchez & L.M. Ortega

Species of tree

Eugenia uxpanapensis is a species of plant in the family Myrtaceae. It is endemic to the Uxpanapa region of Veracruz state in eastern Mexico.
