= Eugenia abbreviata =

Conservation status
- Endangered (IUCN 2.3)

Scientific classification
- Kingdom: Plantae
- Clade: Tracheophytes
- Clade: Angiosperms
- Clade: Eudicots
- Clade: Rosids
- Order: Myrtales
- Family: Myrtaceae
- Genus: Eugenia
- Species: E. abbreviata

Binomial name
- Eugenia abbreviata Urb.

Species of flowering plant

Eugenia abbreviata is a species of plant in the family Myrtaceae. It is a shrub endemic to Jamaica.
