= Eugenia heterochroa =

Conservation status
- Vulnerable (IUCN 2.3)

Scientific classification
- Kingdom: Plantae
- Clade: Tracheophytes
- Clade: Angiosperms
- Clade: Eudicots
- Clade: Rosids
- Order: Myrtales
- Family: Myrtaceae
- Genus: Eugenia
- Species: E. heterochroa

Binomial name
- Eugenia heterochroa Urb.

Species of flowering plant

Eugenia heterochroa is a species of flowering plant in the family Myrtaceae. It is a shrub endemic to south-central Jamaica. It is known only from Clarendon Parish, where it grows on forested rocky limestone hilltops at about 760 metres elevation.
