= Jacques Cambessèdes =

French botanist

Jacques Cambessèdes (26 August 1799 – 19 October 1863) was a French botanist born in Montpellier.

In March – June 1825, prompted by suggestions of Jaques Étienne Gay and Alexander von Humboldt, Cambessèdes performed investigations involving flora of the Balearic Islands. From this expedition he published the informal Excursions dans les îles Baléares (1826) and the first floristic inventory of the Balearics, Enumeratio plantarum quas in insulis Balearibus collegit (1827).

In 1851, he married the botanical illustrator Marie Eulalie Ledoux, widow of Alire Raffeneau Delile, known as Mme. Eulalie Delile.

He has several botanical species named after him, including Paeonia cambessedesii, a peony native to Mallorca.
