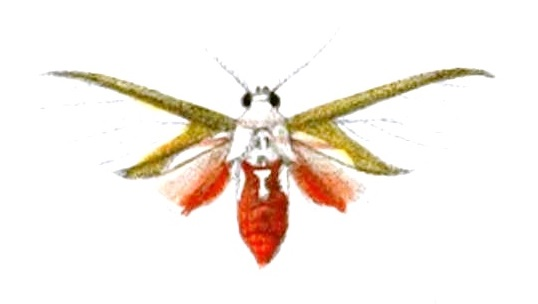
- Eupseudosoma larissa

Scientific classification
- Kingdom: Animalia
- Phylum: Arthropoda
- Class: Insecta
- Order: Lepidoptera
- Superfamily: Noctuoidea
- Family: Erebidae
- Subfamily: Arctiinae
- Subtribe: Phaegopterina
- Genus: Eupseudosoma; Grote, 1865

Type species
- Charidea nivea Herrich-Schäffer, [1855]

= Eupseudosoma =

Genus of moths

Eupseudosoma is a genus of moths in the family Erebidae. The genus was erected by Augustus Radcliffe Grote in 1865. The best known and most widespread species is Eupseudosoma involutum, the snowy eupseudosoma, a bright white moth which is found from the southern United States right down to the south of South America. There are a few other species found across the Americas.

== Species ==
- Eupseudosoma aberrans Schaus, 1905

Recorded food plants include Diospyros, Eucalyptus, Eugenia and Psidium

- Eupseudosoma agramma Hampson, 1901
- Eupseudosoma grandis Rothschild, 1909
- Eupseudosoma involutum Sepp, 1855 – snowy eupseudosoma

Recorded food plants include Diospyros, Eucalyptus, Eugenia and Psidium

- Eupseudosoma larissa (Druce, 1890)

== Former species ==
- Eupseudosoma bifasciata (Cramer, [1779])
- Eupseudosoma eurygania (Druce, 1897)
