= E. grandis =

E. grandis may refer to:

- Edithcolea grandis, a succulent plant species distributed throughout Ethiopia, Somalia, Kenya, Tanzania, Uganda, Yemen and Socotra Island
- Eucalyptus grandis, the flooded gum or rose gum, a tall tree species found in New South Wales and Queensland in Australia
- Eupseudosoma grandis, a moth species in the genus Eupseudosoma
- Euroscaptor grandis, the greater Chinese mole, a mammal species found in China and Vietnam
- Exoprosopa grandis, a fly species in the genus Exoprosopa
- Exorista grandis, a fly species in the genus Exorista

== Synonyms ==
- Elaeocarpus grandis, a synonym for Elaeocarpus angustifolius, the blue marble tree, blue fig or blue quandong, a flowering plant species found in New-Caledonia, Queensland and New South Wales
- Echimys grandis, a synonym for Toromys grandis, the giant tree rat or white-faced tree rat, a spiny rat species found in Brazil

== See also ==
- Grandis (disambiguation)
