= Guava =

Tropical fruit

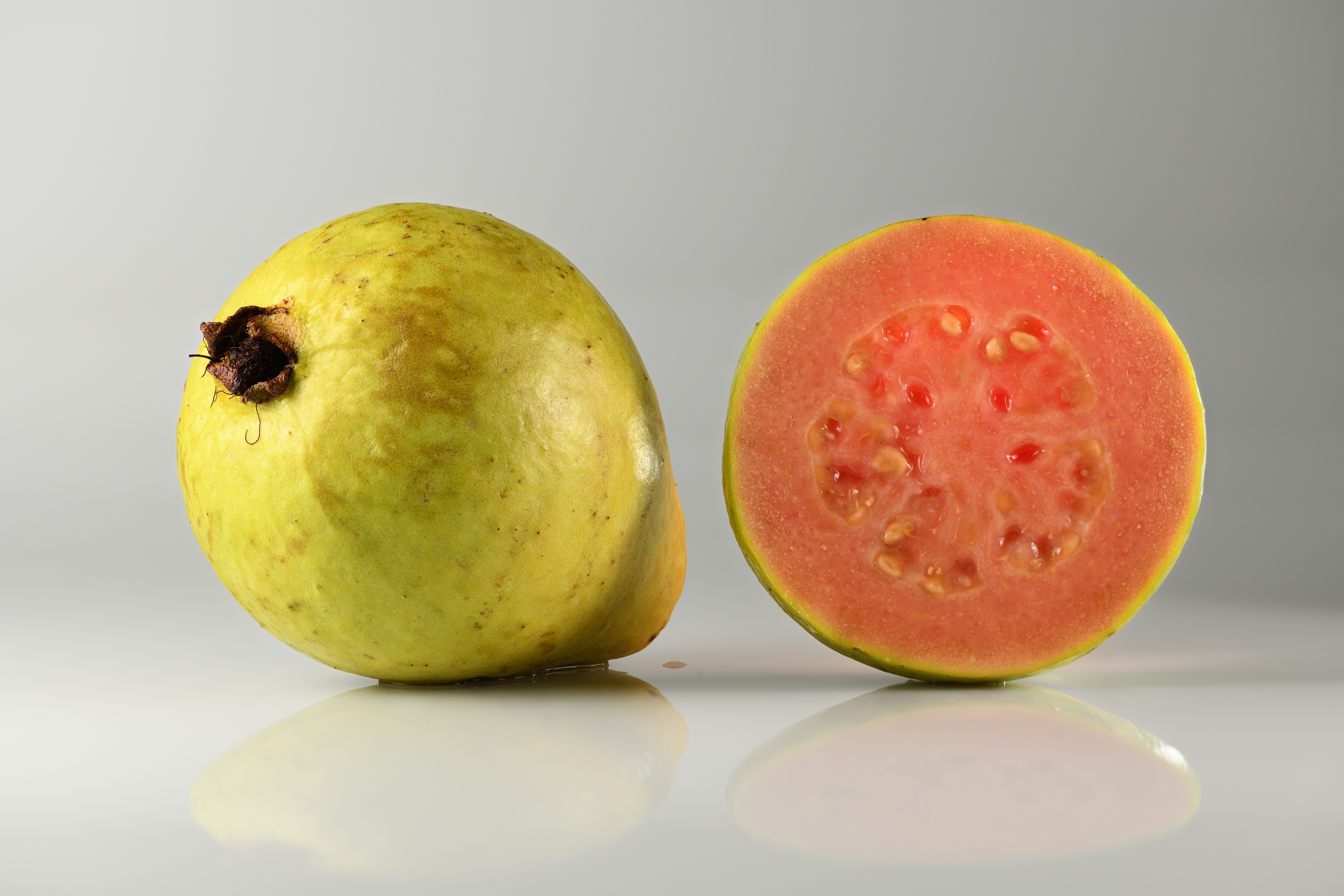
Guava with slice

Guava (/ˈɡwɑːvə/ GWAH-və), also known as the 'guava-pear' in various regions, is a common tropical fruit cultivated in many tropical and subtropical regions. The common guava Psidium guajava (lemon guava, apple guava) is a small tree in the myrtle family (Myrtaceae), native to Mexico, Central America, the Caribbean and northern South America. Botanically, guavas are berries.

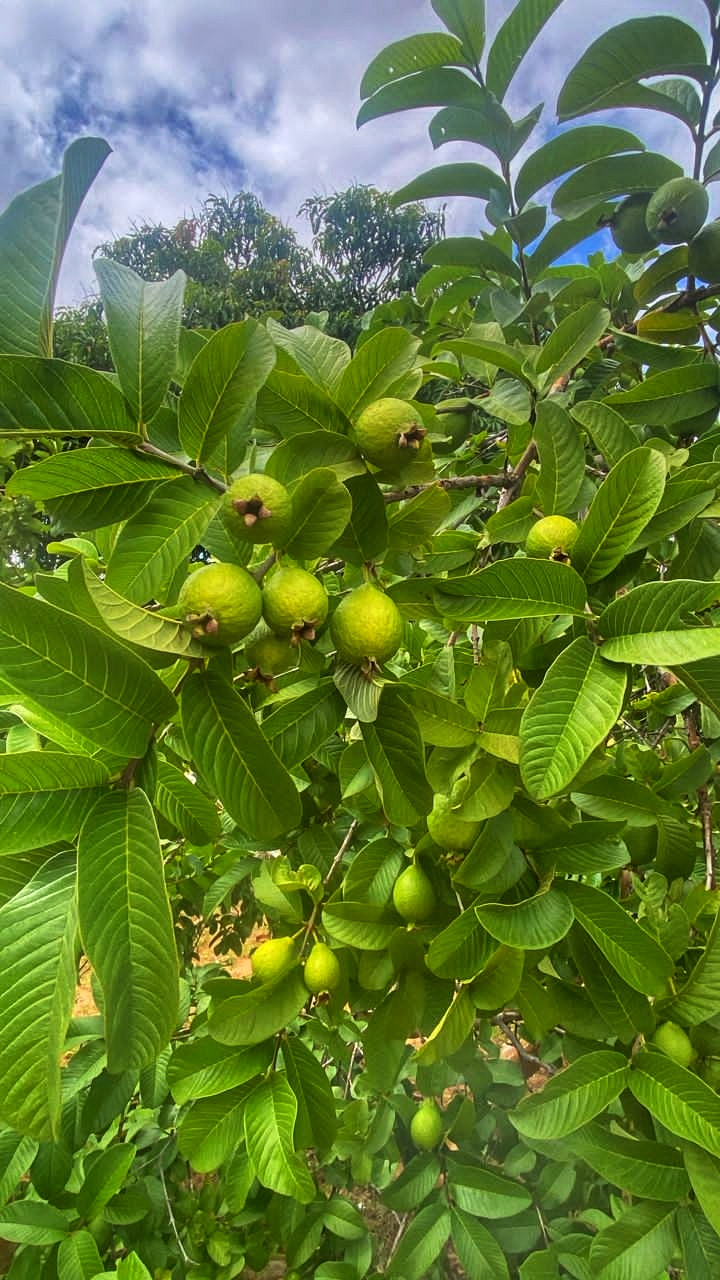
Guava fruit tree

The name guava is also given to some other species in the genus Psidium, such as strawberry guava (Psidium cattleyanum) and to the pineapple guava, Feijoa sellowiana. In 2024, the world production of guavas (data combined with mangos and mangosteens) was 62 million tonnes, led by India having 45% of the total.

== Etymology ==
The term guava appears to have been in use since the mid-16th century. The name is derived from Taíno, a language of the Arawaks, as guayabo for guava tree via the Spanish for guayaba. It has been adapted in many European and Asian languages, having a similar form.

== Origin and distribution ==
Guavas originated from an area thought to extend from Mexico, Central America or northern South America throughout the Caribbean region. Archaeological sites in Peru yielded evidence of guava cultivation as early as 2500 BC.

Guava was adopted as a crop in subtropical and tropical Asia, parts of the United States (Florida and Hawaii), tropical Africa, and Oceania. Guavas were introduced to Florida in the 19th century and are grown there as far north as Sarasota, Chipley, Waldo and Fort Pierce. However, they are a primary host of the Caribbean fruit fly and must be protected against infestation in areas of Florida where this pest is present.

Guavas are cultivated in several tropical and subtropical countries. Several species are grown commercially; apple guava and its cultivars are those most commonly traded internationally. Guavas also grow in southwestern Europe, specifically the Costa del Sol on Málaga (Spain) and Greece where guavas have been commercially grown since the middle of the 20th century and they proliferate as cultivars. Mature trees of most species are fairly cold-hardy and can survive temperatures slightly colder than −4 °C (25 °F) for short periods of time, but younger plants will likely freeze to the ground.

Guavas are of interest to home growers in subtropical areas such as India, as one of the few tropical fruits that can grow to fruiting size in pots indoors. When grown from seed, guava trees can bear fruit in two years, and can continue to do so for forty years.

== Types ==
The most frequently eaten species, and the one often simply referred to as "the guava", is the apple guava (Psidium guajava). Guavas are typical Myrtoideae, with tough dark heavy leaves that are opposite, simple, elliptic to ovate, and 5–15 centimetres (2–6 in) long. The flowers are white, with five petals and numerous stamens. The fruits are many-seeded berries.

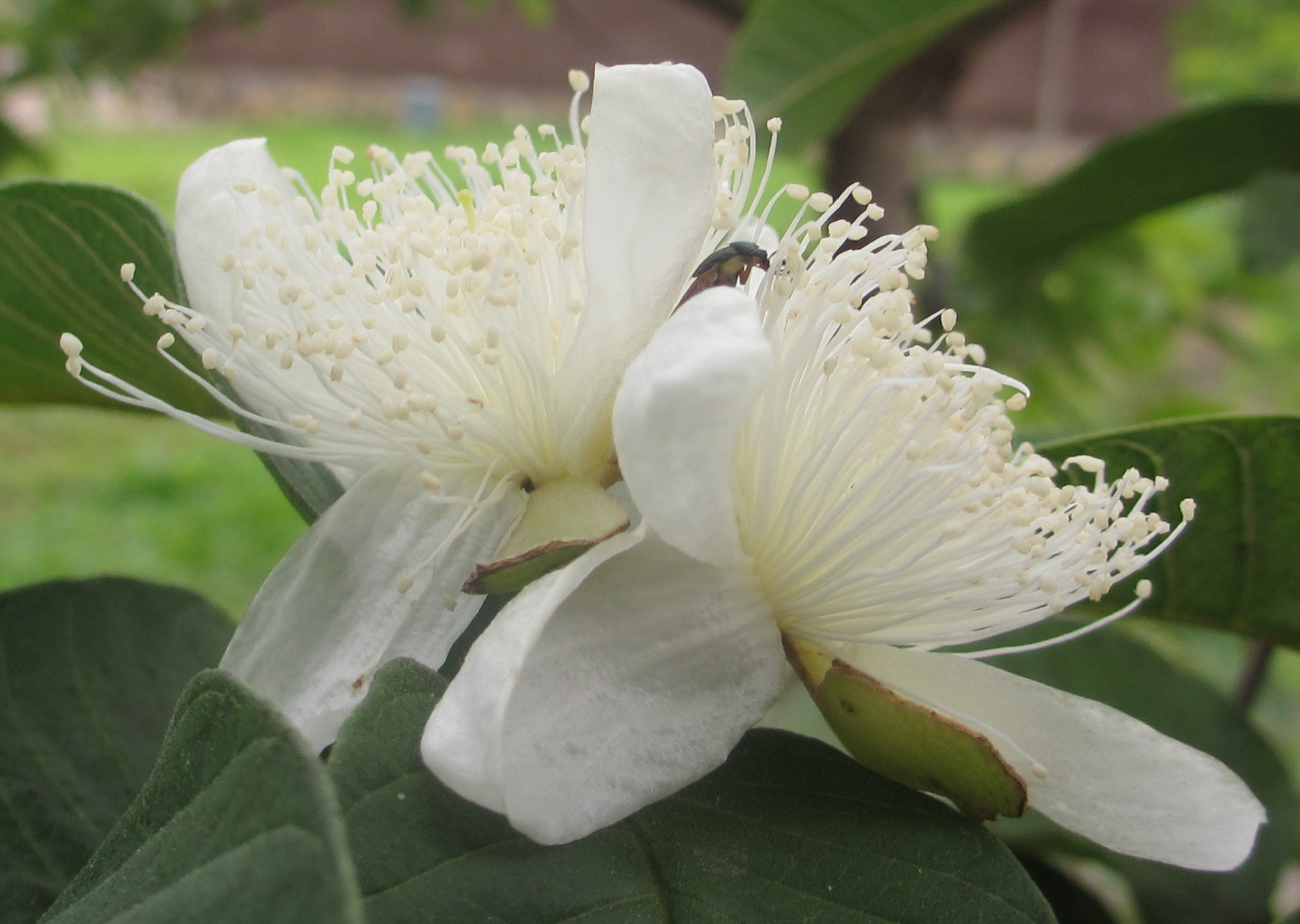
Apple guava flower

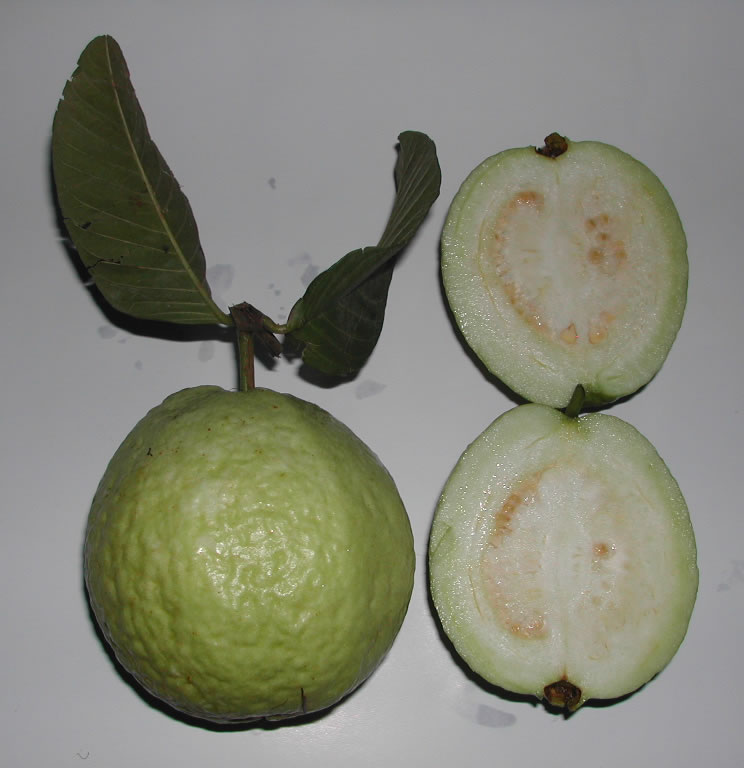
White guava

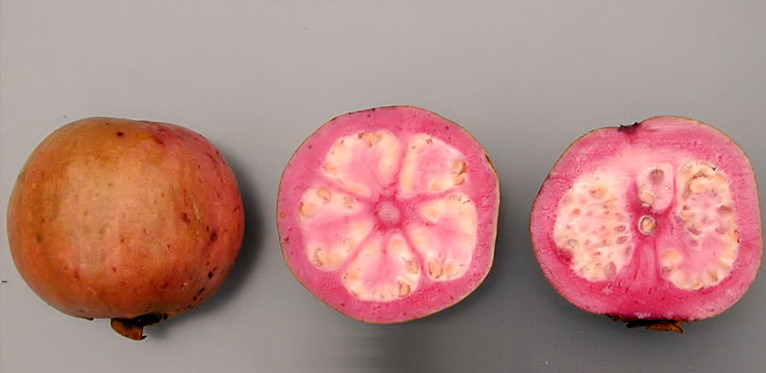
'Thai maroon' guava, a red apple guava cultivar

== Ecology ==
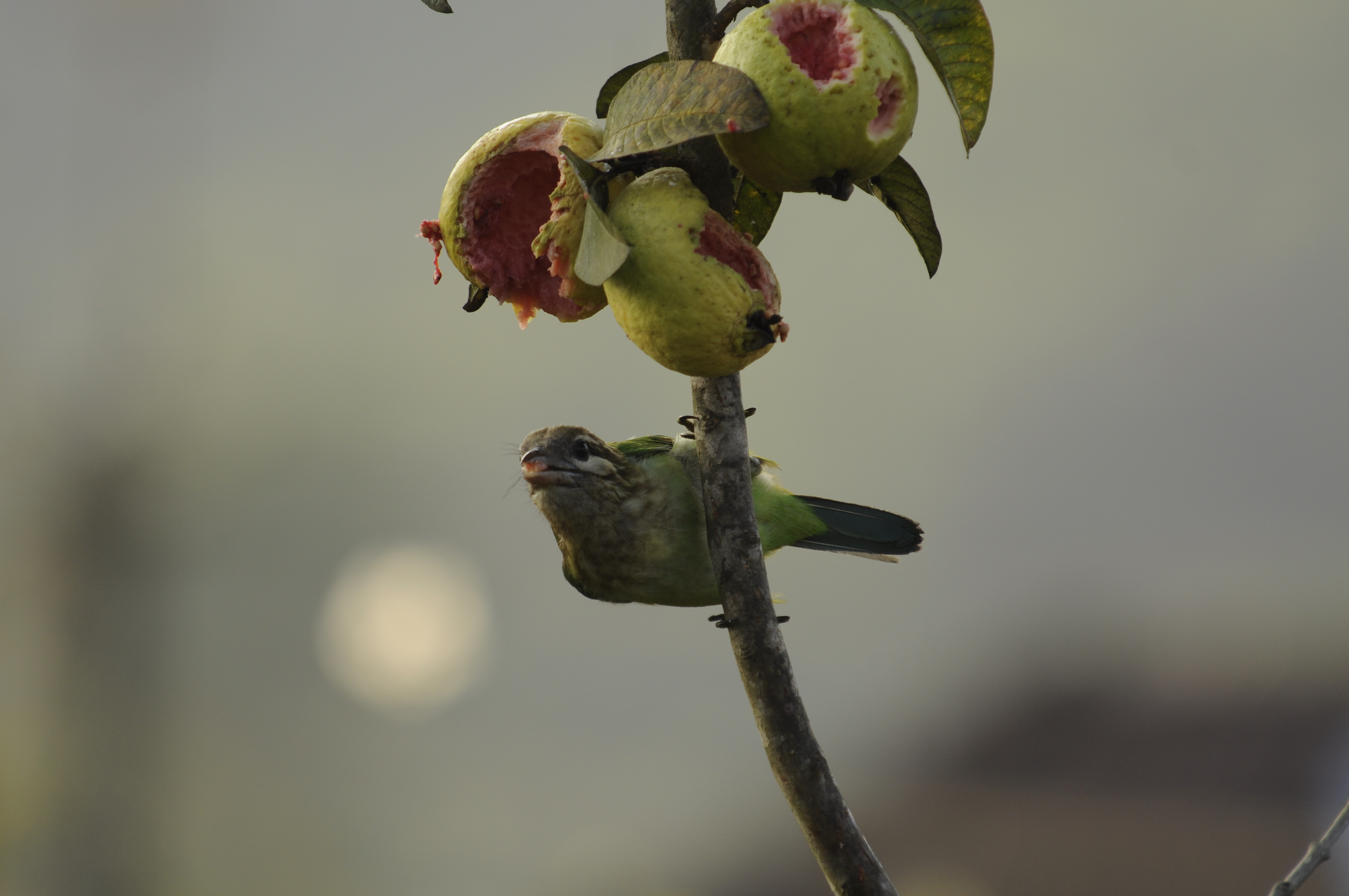
White-cheeked barbet eating guava

Psidium species are eaten by the caterpillars of some Lepidoptera, mainly moths like the Ello Sphinx (Erinnyis ello), Eupseudosoma aberrans, E. involutum, and Hypercompe icasia. Mites, like Pronematus pruni and Tydeus munsteri, are known to be crop pests of the apple guava (P. guajava) and perhaps other species. The bacterium Erwinia psidii causes rot diseases of the apple guava.

The fruit is cultivated and favored by humans, and many other animals such as birds consume it, readily dispersing the seeds in their droppings. In Hawaii, strawberry guava (P. littorale) has become an aggressive invasive species threatening extinction to more than 100 other plant species. By contrast, several guava species have become rare due to habitat destruction and at least one (Jamaican guava, P. dumetorum) is already extinct.

Guava wood is used for meat smoking in Hawaii, and is used at barbecue competitions across the United States. In Cuba and Mexico, the leaves are used in barbecues.

== Fruit ==
Guava fruits, usually 4 to 12 centimetres (1 1/2 to 4 1/2 in) long, are round or oval depending on the species. They have a pronounced and typical fragrance, similar to lemon rind but less sharp. The outer skin may be rough, often with a bitter taste, or soft and sweet. Varying between species, the skin can be any thickness, is usually green before maturity, but may be yellow, maroon, or green when ripe. The pulp inside may be sweet or sour and off-white ("white" guavas) to deep pink ("red" guavas). The seeds in the central pulp vary in number and hardness, depending on species.

Guava* production 2024, millions of tonnes
| India | 27.8 |
| Indonesia | 4.1 |
| China | 4.1 |
| Mexico | 2.6 |
| Brazil | 2.4 |
| Pakistan | 2.1 |
| World | 62.2 |
*includes mangoes and mangosteens. Source: FAOSTAT of the United Nations

== Production ==
In 2024, world production of guavas was 62 million tonnes, led by India with 45% of the total (table; mangoes and mangosteens included). Secondary producers were Indonesia and China.

== Uses ==
Guavas, common
Nutritional value per 100 g (3.5 oz)
- Energy: 285 kJ (68 kcal)
- Carbohydrates: 14.32 g
- Sugars: 8.92 g
- Dietary fiber: 5.4 g
- Fat: 0.5 g
- Protein: 2.55 g
Vitamins and minerals
| Vitamins | Quantity %DV^{†} |
| Vitamin A equiv. beta-Carotene | 3% 31 μg 3% 374 μg |
| Thiamine (B1) | 6% 0.067 mg |
| Riboflavin (B2) | 3% 0.04 mg |
| Niacin (B3) | 7% 1.084 mg |
| Pantothenic acid (B5) | 9% 0.451 mg |
| Vitamin B6 | 6% 0.11 mg |
| Folate (B9) | 12% 49 μg |
| Vitamin C | 254% 228.3 mg |
| Vitamin K | 2% 2.2 μg |
| Minerals | Quantity %DV^{†} |
| Calcium | 1% 18 mg |
| Iron | 1% 0.26 mg |
| Magnesium | 5% 22 mg |
| Manganese | 4% 0.1 mg |
| Phosphorus | 3% 40 mg |
| Potassium | 14% 417 mg |
| Sodium | 0% 2 mg |
| Zinc | 2% 0.23 mg |
- Other constituents: Quantity
- Water: 81 g
- Lycopene: 5200 µg
- Link to USDA Database entry
- ^{†}Percentages estimated using US recommendations for adults, except for potassium, which is estimated based on expert recommendation from the National Academies.

=== Culinary ===
In Mexico and other Latin American countries, the beverage agua fresca is often made with guava. The entire fruit is a key ingredient in punch, and the juice is often used in culinary sauces (hot or cold), ales, candies, dried snacks, fruit bars, and desserts, or dipped in chamoy. Pulque de guayaba ("guayaba" is Spanish for guava) is a common alcoholic beverage in these regions.

In many countries, guava is eaten raw, typically cut into quarters or eaten like an apple; it is also eaten with a pinch of salt and pepper, cayenne powder or a mix of spices (masala). In the Philippines, ripe guava is used in cooking sinigang. Guava is a snack in Cuba as pastelitos de guayaba; and in Taiwan, sold on many street corners and night markets during hot weather, accompanied by packets of dried plum powder mixed with sugar and salt for dipping. In east Asia, guava is commonly eaten with sweet and sour dried plum powder mixtures. Guava juice is consumed in many countries. The fruit is also often included in fruit salads.

Because of its high level of pectin, guavas are extensively used to make candies, preserves, jellies, jams, and marmalades (such as Brazilian goiabada and Colombian and Venezuelan bocadillo), and as a marmalade jam served on toast.

Red guavas can be used as the base of salted products such as sauces, substituting for tomatoes, especially to minimize the acidity. A drink may be made from an infusion of guava fruits and leaves, which in Brazil is called chá-de-goiabeira, i.e., "tea" of guava tree leaves.

== Nutrition ==
A raw common guava is 81% water, 14% carbohydrates, 3% protein, and 0.5% fat (table). In a reference amount of 100 grams (3.5 oz), raw guava supplies 285 kilojoules (68 kilocalories) of food energy and is a rich source of dietary fiber and vitamin C (254% of the Daily Value, DV), with moderate levels of folate (12% DV) and potassium (14% DV, table). Raw guava contains lycopene (table).

== Phytochemicals ==
Guava leaves contain both carotenoids and polyphenols, such as (+)-gallocatechin and leucocyanidin. As some of these phytochemicals produce the fruit skin and flesh color, guavas that are red-orange tend to have more polyphenol and carotenoid content than yellow-green ones.

=== Seed oil ===
Guava seed oil may be used for culinary or cosmetics products. It is rich in linoleic acid.

== Folk medicine ==
Since the 1950s, guavas – particularly the leaves – have been studied for their constituents, potential biological properties and history in folk medicine.

== Parasites ==
Guavas are one of the most common hosts for fruit flies like A. suspensa, which lay their eggs in overripe or spoiled guavas. The larvae of these flies then consume the fruit until they can proceed into the pupa stage. This parasitism has led to millions in economic losses for nations in Central America.

Fungal pathogens, Neopestalotiopsis and Pestalotiopsis species are causal agents of guava scab in Colombia.

== Propagation ==
Air layering is an effective method for propagating guava plant. It allows for the production of new plants while maintaining the parent plant's characteristics. This technique involves selecting a healthy branch making a small incision on the branch, and applying rooting hormone to encourage root development. The branch is then wrapped in moist peat moss and covered with plastic to help retain moisture. After several weeks, roots will form, and then a new plant can be severed from the parent and transplanted into soil. This method is particularly beneficial for guava due to its high success rate and ability to produce fruit-bearing plants quickly.

== Gallery ==
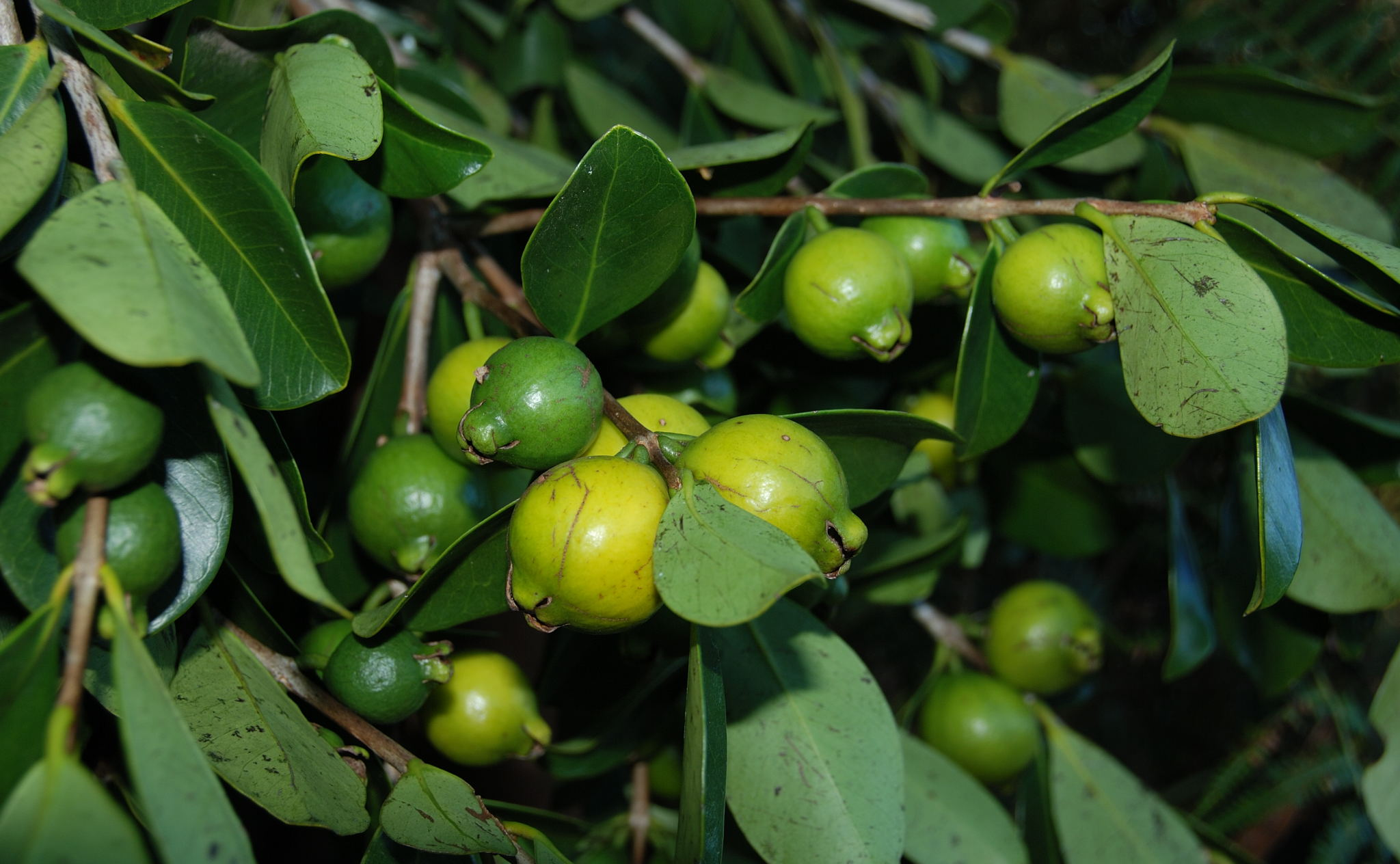
Yellow-fruited cherry guava, (sometimes called lemon guava) Psidium littorale var. littorale

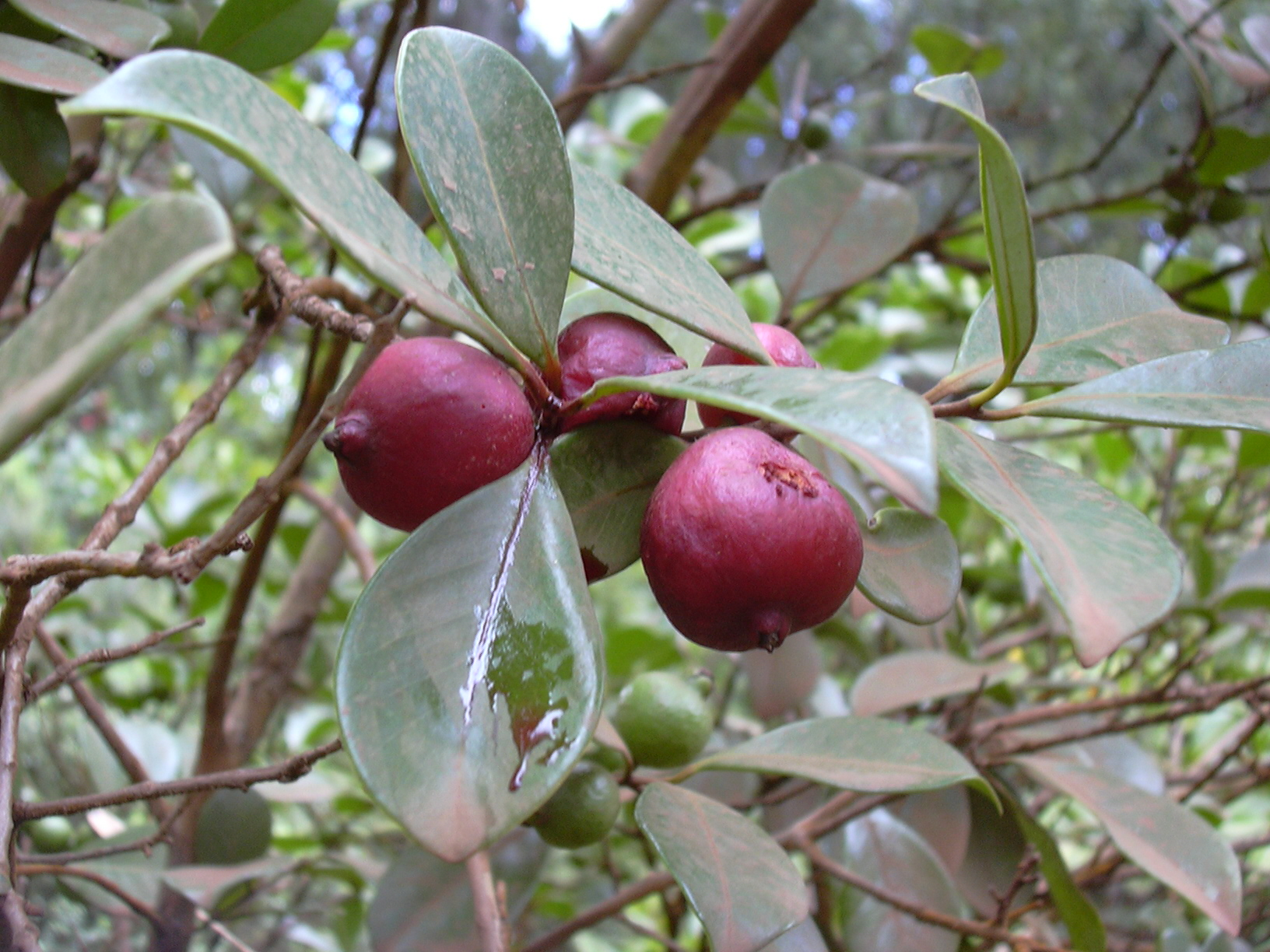
Strawberry guava, Psidium littorale var. cattleyanum

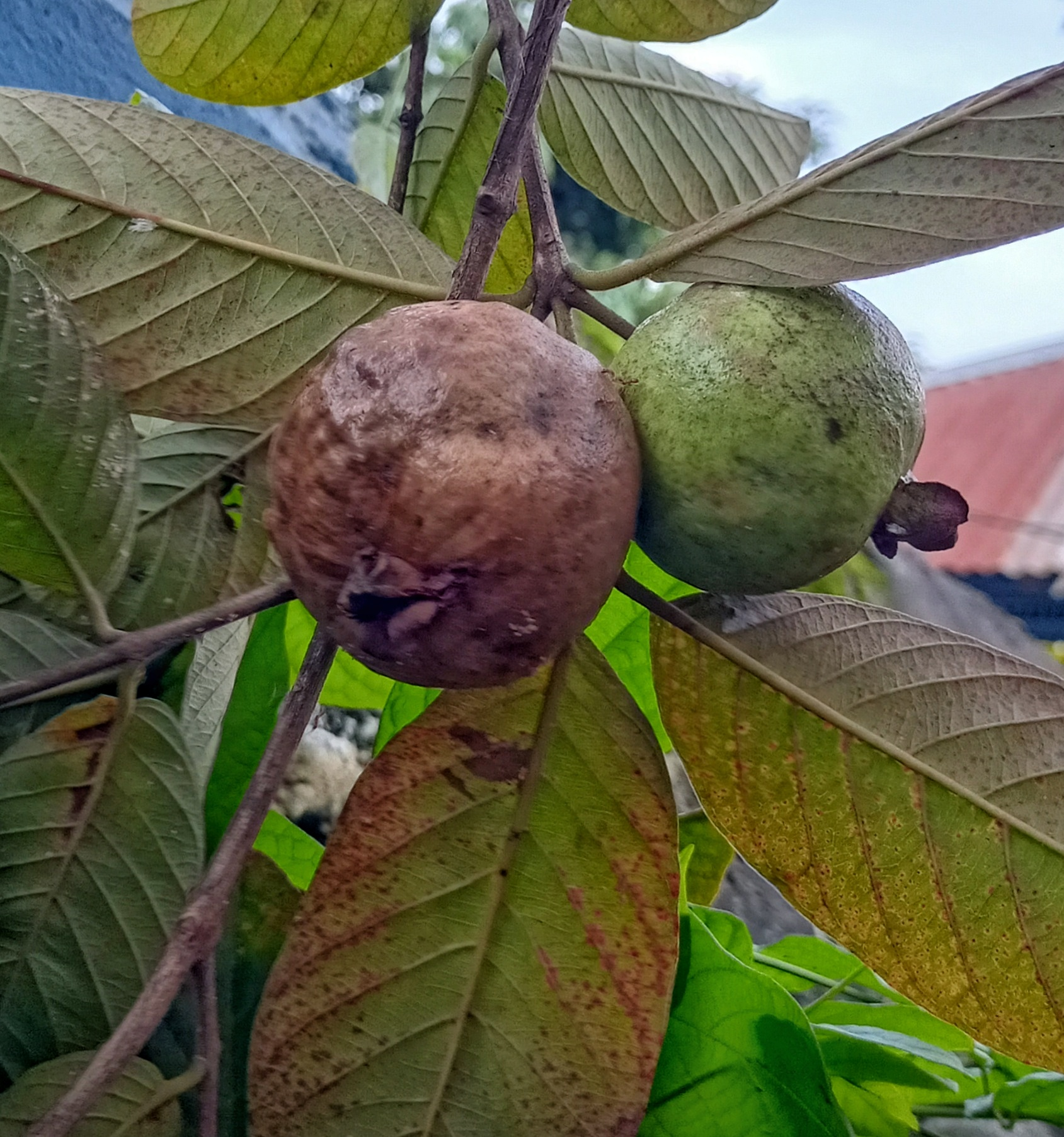
A rotten guava

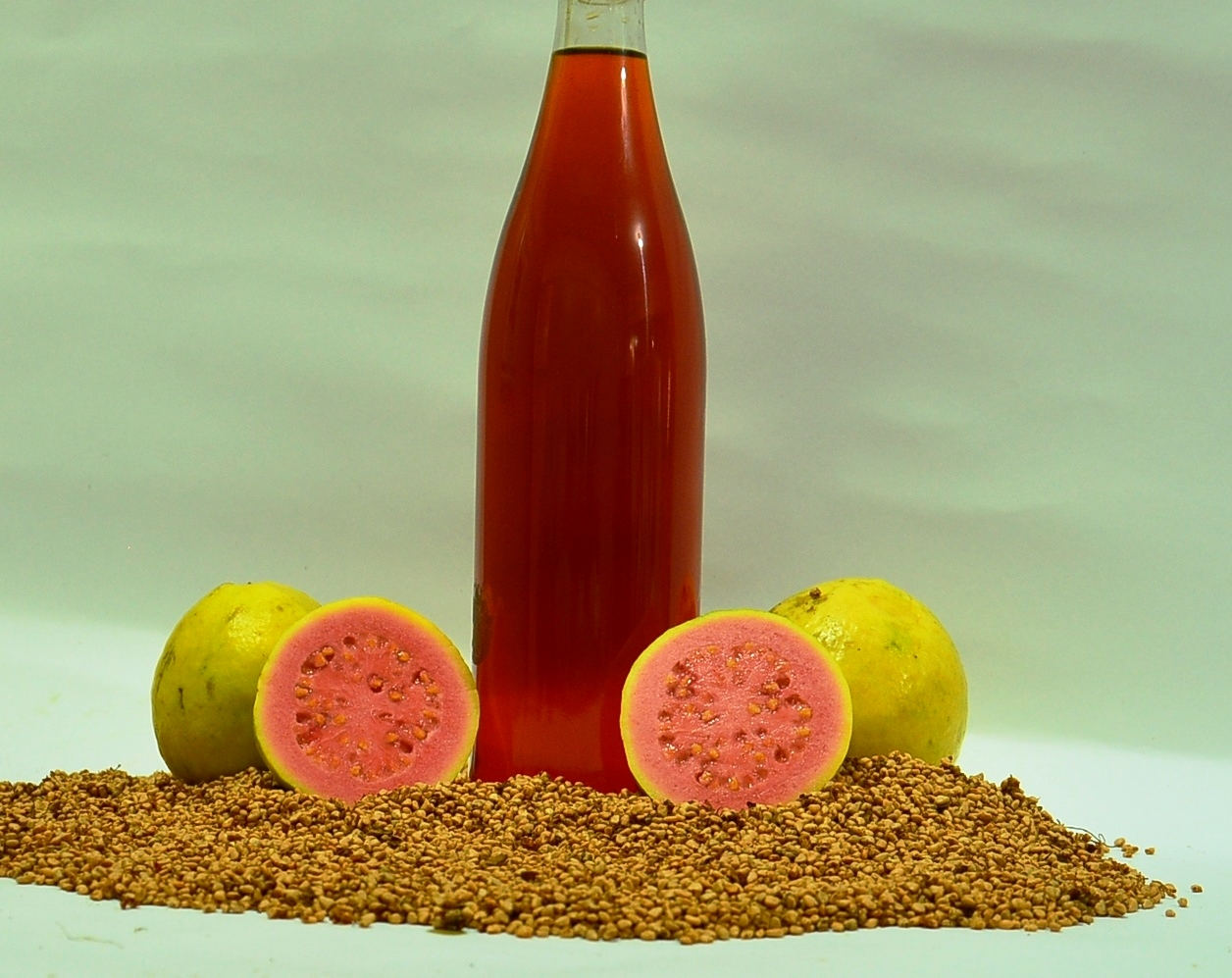
Guava seed oil

== See also ==
- Myrteae, the tribe containing guava and closely related plants with fleshy fruit.
