= Pitomba =

Pitomba may be either of two kinds of fruit tree native to South America:

- Eugenia luschnathiana, a flowering plant in the family Myrtaceae
- Talisia esculenta, a medium-sized tree native to the Amazon Basin
