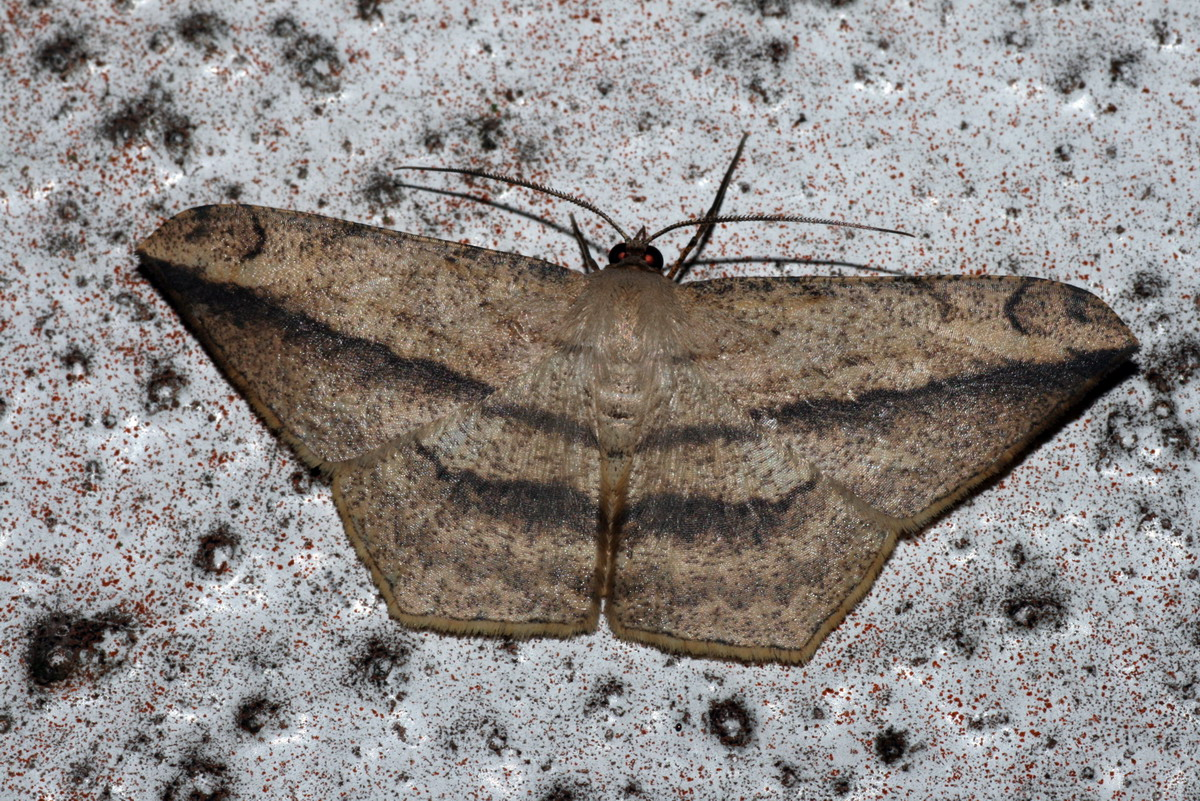

Scientific classification
- Kingdom: Animalia
- Phylum: Arthropoda
- Class: Insecta
- Order: Lepidoptera
- Family: Geometridae
- Genus: Probithia
- Species: P. exclusa

Binomial name
- Probithia exclusa (Walker, 1860)

Synonyms
- Hemerophila exclusa Walker, 1860; Hemerophila praetereuns Walker, 1860; Psamatodes frenata Felder & Rogenhofer, 1875; Bithia lignaria Walker, 1862

= Probithia exclusa =

Species of moth

Probithia exclusa is a moth of the family Geometridae. It is found in the north-eastern Himalaya, Sri Lanka, the Philippines, Sulawesi and Sundaland.

== Description ==
Its wingspan is about 40–46 mm. Both sexes colored. Forewings with a dark lunule on the costa at the postmedial series of specks.=, which is then very oblique and continued on hindwing as an antemedial line. Hindwings with the series of specks medial instead of postmedial. Outer margin of hindwings angled at vein 4 and non-crenulate. Ventral side ochreous, with the markings prominent, rufous, and with waved postmedial and submarginal bands.

Larvae have been reared on Eugenia species.

== Subspecies ==
- Probithia exclusa exclusa (north-eastern Himalaya, Philippines, Sulawesi)
- Probithia exclusa lignaria (Sundaland)
