= Eugenia laevicaulis =

Conservation status
- Least Concern (IUCN 2.3)

Scientific classification
- Kingdom: Plantae
- Clade: Tracheophytes
- Clade: Angiosperms
- Clade: Eudicots
- Clade: Rosids
- Order: Myrtales
- Family: Myrtaceae
- Genus: Eugenia
- Species: E. laevicaulis

Binomial name
- Eugenia laevicaulis Duthie

Species of tree

Eugenia laevicaulis is a species of plant in the family Myrtaceae. It is a tree endemic to Peninsular Malaysia.
