= Eugenia cordifoliolata =

Conservation status
- Vulnerable (IUCN 2.3)

Scientific classification
- Kingdom: Plantae
- Clade: Tracheophytes
- Clade: Angiosperms
- Clade: Eudicots
- Clade: Rosids
- Order: Myrtales
- Family: Myrtaceae
- Genus: Eugenia
- Species: E. cordifoliolata

Binomial name
- Eugenia cordifoliolata Ridley

Species of tree

Eugenia cordifoliolata is a species of plant in the family Myrtaceae. It is a tree endemic to Peninsular Malaysia. It is threatened by habitat loss.
