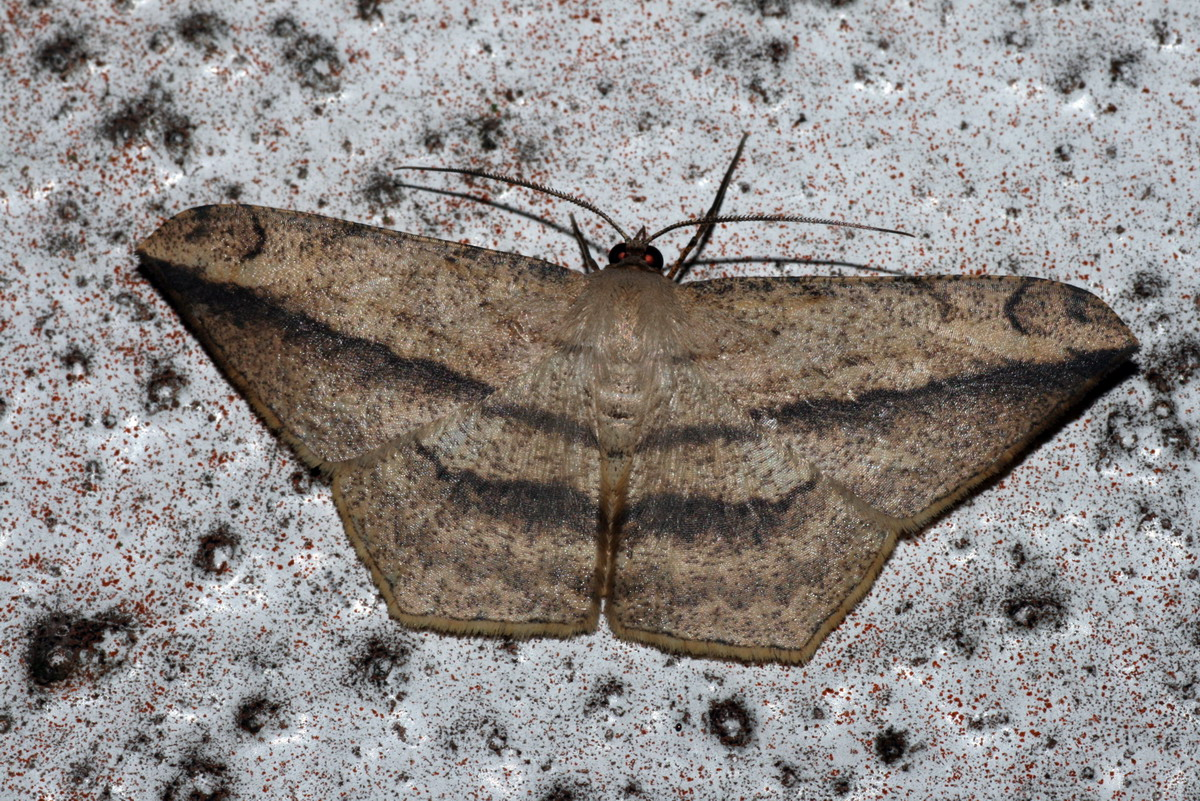
- Probithia exclusa

Scientific classification
- Kingdom: Animalia
- Phylum: Arthropoda
- Clade: Pancrustacea
- Class: Insecta
- Order: Lepidoptera
- Family: Geometridae
- Genus: Probithia

= Probithia =

Genus of moths

Probithia is a genus of moths in the family Geometridae.

== Species ==
- Probithia exclusa (Walker, 1860) north-eastern Himalayas, Philippines, Sulawesi
- Probithia imprimata (Walker, 1861) Borneo, Peninsular Malaysia, Sumatra
- Probithia obstataria (Walker, 1861) Australia
- Probithia perichila (Prout, 1929) Australia, Sulawesi
