= Neidalia irrorata =

Scientific classification
- Domain: Eukaryota
- Kingdom: Animalia
- Phylum: Arthropoda
- Class: Insecta
- Order: Lepidoptera
- Superfamily: Noctuoidea
- Family: Erebidae
- Subfamily: Arctiinae
- Genus: Neidalia
- Species: N. irrorata

Binomial name
- Neidalia irrorata Rothschild, 1917

Species of moth

Neidalia irrorata is a moth of the family Erebidae first described by Walter Rothschild in 1917. It is found in Peru.
