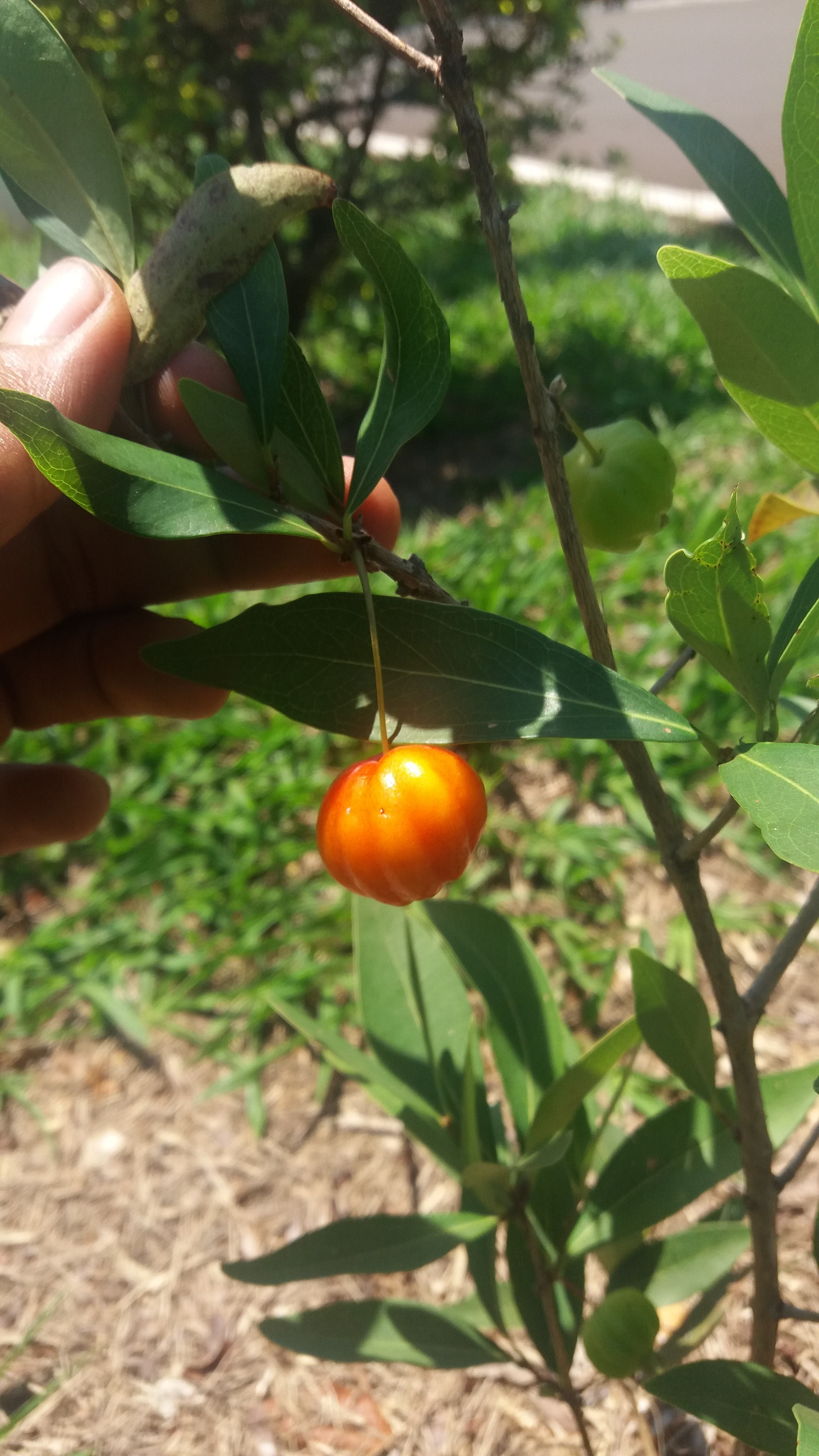

Scientific classification
- Kingdom: Plantae
- Clade: Embryophytes
- Clade: Tracheophytes
- Clade: Spermatophytes
- Clade: Angiosperms
- Clade: Eudicots
- Clade: Rosids
- Order: Myrtales
- Family: Myrtaceae
- Genus: Eugenia
- Species: E. pitanga

Binomial name
- Eugenia pitanga (O.Berg) Nied.

Synonyms
- Eugenia camporum Morong; Eugenia dolichophylla Kiaersk.; Eugenia montigena Barb.Rodr.; Eugenia pitanga var. camporum (Morong) Mattos; Eugenia pitanga var. venosa Mattos; Luma pitanga (O.Berg) Herter; Myrtus pitanga (O.Berg) Kuntze; Myrtus pitanga var. angustifolia Kuntze; Myrtus pitanga f. fasciculata Kuntze; Myrtus pitanga f. subsolitaria Kuntze; Stenocalyx pitanga O.Berg; Stenocalyx pitanga var. nana Mattos

= Eugenia pitanga =

Species of plant in the myrtle family

Eugenia pitanga, commonly known as pitanga do cerrado or savanna pitanga, is a species of plant in the family Myrtaceae. It is found in the savannahs and grasslands of Argentina, Paraguay, and Brazil. It is a deciduous shrub that grows up to 2 metres (6 ft 7 in) tall, has rhizomatous rootstock allowing it to form dense thickets, and produces red, edible fruit, 15–25 mm (0.59–0.98 in) in diameter.
