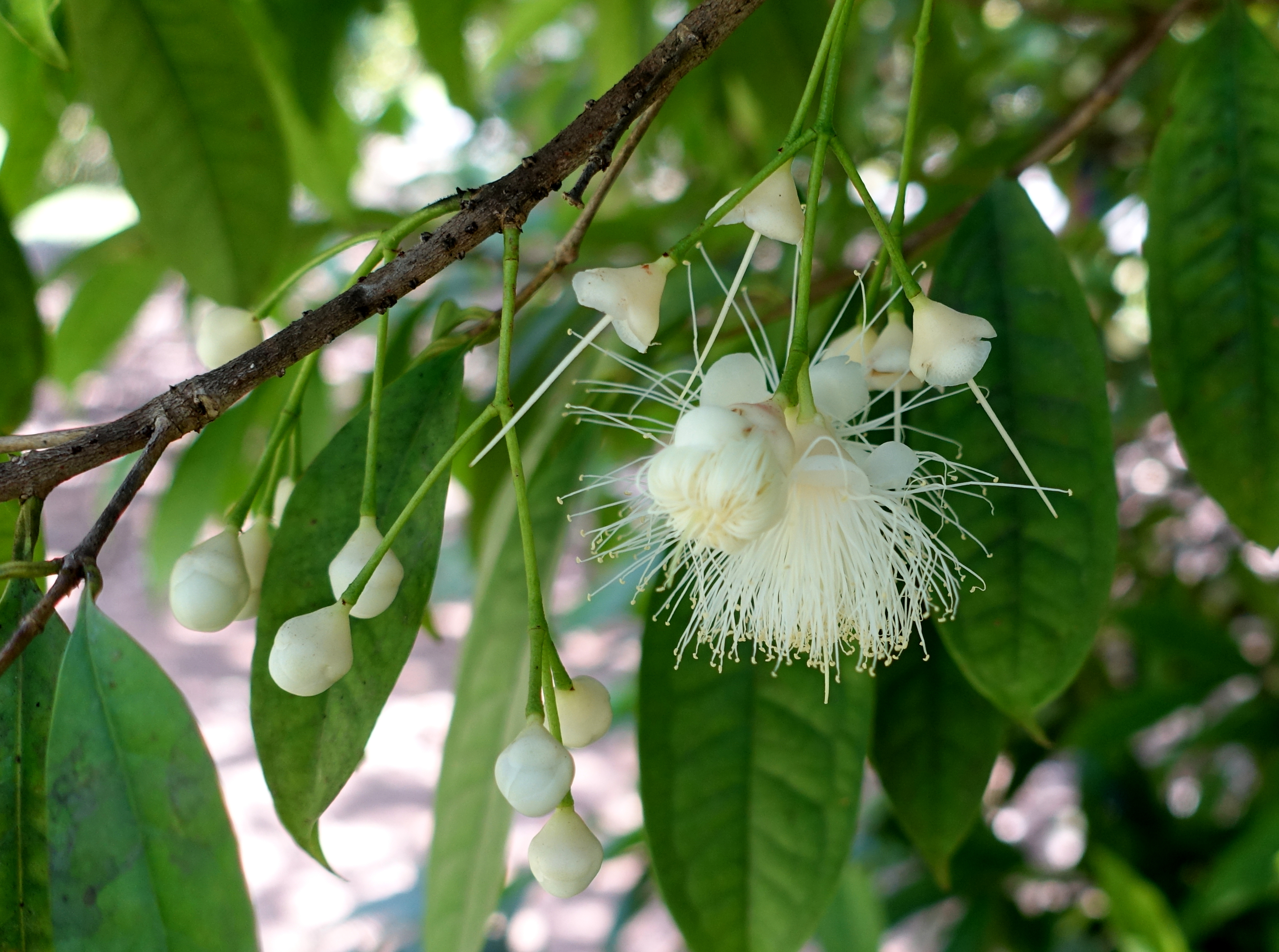

Conservation status
- Least Concern (IUCN 3.1)

Scientific classification
- Kingdom: Plantae
- Clade: Tracheophytes
- Clade: Angiosperms
- Clade: Eudicots
- Clade: Rosids
- Order: Myrtales
- Family: Myrtaceae
- Genus: Eugenia
- Species: E. victoriana

Binomial name
- Eugenia victoriana Cuatrec.

= Eugenia victoriana =

Species of tree

Eugenia victoriana is a small South American fruit tree of the genus Eugenia. Its common names include guayabilla and sundrop. It is endemic to Colombia.

Eugenia victoriana has the largest fruit of all known Eugenia species. The tree first flowers in its third or fourth year. The fruits are orange-colored, and have sour flesh and two to four large seeds.

The species was described by José Cuatrecasas in 1970.

== See also ==
- Chicha, a South American drink sometimes prepared with guayabilla fruit
