= Probithia obstataria =

Scientific classification
- Kingdom: Animalia
- Phylum: Arthropoda
- Clade: Pancrustacea
- Class: Insecta
- Order: Lepidoptera
- Family: Geometridae
- Genus: Probithia
- Species: P. obstataria

Binomial name
- Probithia obstataria (Walker, 1861)

Synonyms
- Anisodes obstataria Walker, 1861; Macaria obstataria Walker, 1861; Nadagarodes turpis Warren, 1897

Species of moth

Probithia obstataria is a moth of the family Geometridae first described by Francis Walker in 1861. It is found in Sri Lanka and Australia.

Antennae of male weakly bipectinate (comb like on both sides). Irregular and oblique postmedial of the forewing diffuse grey. Discal spots found in medial fasciae of both wings.
