= Eugenia subterminalis =

Conservation status
- Least Concern (IUCN 3.1)

Scientific classification
- Kingdom: Plantae
- Clade: Tracheophytes
- Clade: Angiosperms
- Clade: Eudicots
- Clade: Rosids
- Order: Myrtales
- Family: Myrtaceae
- Genus: Eugenia
- Species: E. subterminalis

Binomial name
- Eugenia subterminalis DC.

Synonyms
- Synonymy: Calycorectes belemii Mattos; Calycorectes legrandii Mattos; Calycorectes paraguayensis Mattos; Calycorectes psidiiflorus (O.Berg) Sobral; Calycorectes psidiiflorus var. legrandii (Mattos) Mattos; Calycorectes psidiiflorus var. schultzianus (Mattos) Mattos; Calycorectes psidiiflorus var. triflorus Mattos; Calycorectes riedelianus O.Berg; Calycorectes schultzianus Mattos; Calycorectes striatulus Mattos; Eugenia belemii (Mattos) Mattos; Eugenia psidiiflora O.Berg; Eugenia psidiiflora var. riedelinana (O.Berg) Mattos; Eugenia psidiiflora var. schultziana (Mattos) Mattos; Eugenia psidiiflora var. triflora (Mattos) Mattos; Psidium pirayuense Barb.Rodr.; Psidium tobatyense Barb.Rodr.; Stenocalyx rufescens Kausel

Species of plant in the myrtle family

Eugenia subterminalis, commonly known as cambuí pitanga, cereja do mato verdadeira, pitanga lisa de sombra, pitanga preta, and cambuízão vermelho do rio Paranapanema, is a species of plant in the family Myrtaceae. It is endemic to araucária forest in eastern and southern Brazil, Paraguay, and northeastern Argentina. The plant is a semi-deciduous shrub that grows to between 2 and 4 metres (6.6 and 13.1 ft) tall, and produces egg shaped fruit between 15 and 25 mm (0.59 and 0.98 in) tall, and 18 and 20 mm (0.71 and 0.79 in) wide.

The IUCN Red List assesses the species as Least Concern under the synonym Eugenia psidiiflora.
