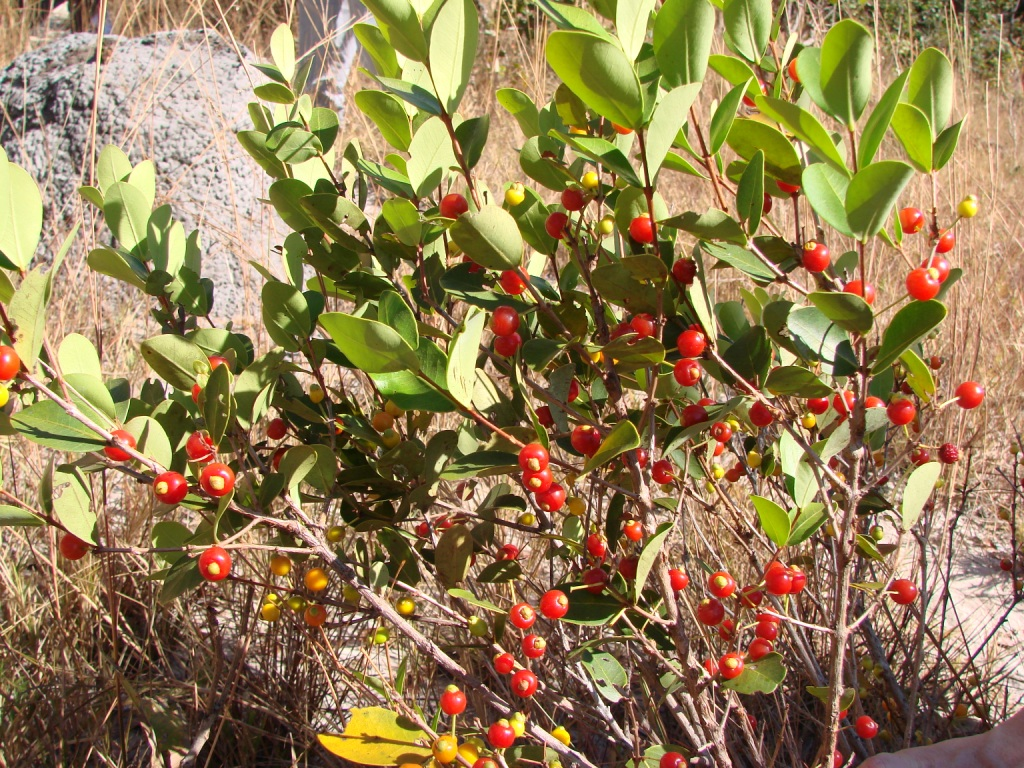

Scientific classification
- Kingdom: Plantae
- Clade: Tracheophytes
- Clade: Angiosperms
- Clade: Eudicots
- Clade: Rosids
- Order: Myrtales
- Family: Myrtaceae
- Genus: Eugenia
- Species: E. punicifolia

Binomial name
- Eugenia punicifolia (Kunth) DC. 1828

= Eugenia punicifolia =

Species of plant

Eugenia punicifolia is a species of plant in the family Myrtaceae. It is found in Bolivia, Argentina, Brazil, Colombia, Cuba, French Guiana, Guyana, Paraguay, Peru, Suriname, and Venezuela.

== Description ==
It is a strongly-branched shrub or a small tree that grows predominantly in the wet tropical biome. Eugenia punicifolia is among the most common and widely distributed Myrtaceae species in South America, found across various habitats in both Cuba and South America.

It can reach up to 8 meters in height. The leaves are elliptic or obovoid measuring 2–10 cm by 1–6.5 cm. The species produces white fragrant flowers from June to March. The fruits are edible with glossy skin and scarlet red color. The fruits have a sweet but slightly astringent flavor.

== Uses ==
The fruits are consumed fresh or used to make juices, ice creams, and jellies. The leaves and bark are used in traditional medicine to treat wounds, diabetes, and fevers. Research has demonstrated that the plant possesses anti-inflammatory, gastroprotective, pain-relieving, blood sugar-lowering, blood pressure-reducing, antioxidant, and antifungal properties.
