= Eugenia umtamvunensis =

Conservation status
- Endangered (IUCN 3.1)

Scientific classification
- Kingdom: Plantae
- Clade: Tracheophytes
- Clade: Angiosperms
- Clade: Eudicots
- Clade: Rosids
- Order: Myrtales
- Family: Myrtaceae
- Genus: Eugenia
- Species: E. umtamvunensis

Binomial name
- Eugenia umtamvunensis A.E.van Wyk

Species of flowering plant

Eugenia umtamvunensis is a species of flowering plant in the family Myrtaceae. It is a shrub or tree native to the Cape Provinces and KwaZulu-Natal in South Africa. It is threatened by habitat loss.
