= Neidalia villacresi =

Scientific classification
- Domain: Eukaryota
- Kingdom: Animalia
- Phylum: Arthropoda
- Class: Insecta
- Order: Lepidoptera
- Superfamily: Noctuoidea
- Family: Erebidae
- Subfamily: Arctiinae
- Genus: Neidalia
- Species: N. villacresi

Binomial name
- Neidalia villacresi (Dognin, 1894)

Synonyms
- Idalus villacresi Dognin, 1894

Species of moth

Neidalia villacresi is a moth of the family Erebidae first described by Paul Dognin in 1894. It is found in Ecuador.
