= Neidalia cerdai =

Scientific classification
- Kingdom: Animalia
- Phylum: Arthropoda
- Class: Insecta
- Order: Lepidoptera
- Superfamily: Noctuoidea
- Family: Erebidae
- Subfamily: Arctiinae
- Genus: Neidalia
- Species: N. cerdai

Binomial name
- Neidalia cerdai Toulgoët, 1997

Species of moth

Neidalia cerdai is a moth of the family Erebidae first described by Hervé de Toulgoët in 1997. It is found in French Guiana.
