= Eugenia lamprophylla =

Conservation status
- Vulnerable (IUCN 2.3)

Scientific classification
- Kingdom: Plantae
- Clade: Tracheophytes
- Clade: Angiosperms
- Clade: Eudicots
- Clade: Rosids
- Order: Myrtales
- Family: Myrtaceae
- Genus: Eugenia
- Species: E. lamprophylla

Binomial name
- Eugenia lamprophylla Urb.

Species of flowering plant

Eugenia lamprophylla is a species of flowering plant in the family Myrtaceae. It is a tree endemic to Jamaica. It grows in woodland on rocky hillsides at the base of limestone cliffs.

The species was described by Ignatz Urban in 1912.
