= Eugenia tenuipedunculata =

Conservation status
- Vulnerable (IUCN 3.1)

Scientific classification
- Kingdom: Plantae
- Clade: Tracheophytes
- Clade: Angiosperms
- Clade: Eudicots
- Clade: Rosids
- Order: Myrtales
- Family: Myrtaceae
- Genus: Eugenia
- Species: E. tenuipedunculata

Binomial name
- Eugenia tenuipedunculata Kiaersk.

Synonyms
- Calycorectes australis D.Legrand; Calycorectes australis var. impressovenosus D.Legrand; Calycorectes duarteanus D.Legrand; Calycorectes pirataquinensis Mattos; Eugenia brevistyla D.Legrand; Eugenia falkenbergiana Mattos; Eugenia imaruiensis D.Legrand; Eugenia neoaustralis Sobral; Eugenia neoaustralis var. impressovenosa (D.Legrand) Mattos; Eugenia pirataquinensis (Mattos) Mattos

Species of flowering plant

Eugenia tenuipedunculata is a species of flowering plant in the family Myrtaceae. It is a tree native to eastern and southern Brazil. It grows up to 12 metres tall in moist Atlantic Forest and in gallery forest in the Cerrado savanna.
