= Eugenia truncata =

Conservation status
- Near Threatened (IUCN 3.1)

Scientific classification
- Kingdom: Plantae
- Clade: Tracheophytes
- Clade: Angiosperms
- Clade: Eudicots
- Clade: Rosids
- Order: Myrtales
- Family: Myrtaceae
- Genus: Eugenia
- Species: E. truncata

Binomial name
- Eugenia truncata O.Berg

Synonyms
- Eugenia oreinoma O.Berg; Eugenia guanacastensis Standl.

Species of flowering plant

Eugenia truncata is a species of flowering plant in the family Myrtaceae. It is a shrub or tree native to Costa Rica and Panama.
