= Neidalia =

Scientific classification
- Kingdom: Animalia
- Phylum: Arthropoda
- Class: Insecta
- Order: Lepidoptera
- Superfamily: Noctuoidea
- Family: Erebidae
- Subfamily: Arctiinae
- Subtribe: Phaegopterina
- Genus: Neidalia; Hampson, 1901

Genus of moths

Neidalia is a genus of moths in the family Erebidae. The genus was erected by George Hampson in 1901.

== Species ==
- Neidalia bifasciata (Cramer, [1779])
- Neidalia cerdai Toulgoët, 1997
- Neidalia dulcicula Schaus, 1929
- Neidalia dognini
- Neidalia eurygania (Druce, 1897)
- Neidalia irrorata Rothschild, 1917
- Neidalia ockendeni
- Neidalia orientalis
- Neidalia villacresi
