= Neidalia dulcicula =

Scientific classification
- Domain: Eukaryota
- Kingdom: Animalia
- Phylum: Arthropoda
- Class: Insecta
- Order: Lepidoptera
- Superfamily: Noctuoidea
- Family: Erebidae
- Subfamily: Arctiinae
- Genus: Neidalia
- Species: N. dulcicula

Binomial name
- Neidalia dulcicula Schaus, 1929

Species of moth

Neidalia dulcicula is a moth of the family Erebidae first described by William Schaus in 1929. It is found in Brazil.
