= Eugenia azeda =

Conservation status
- Near Threatened (IUCN 3.1)

Scientific classification
- Kingdom: Plantae
- Clade: Tracheophytes
- Clade: Angiosperms
- Clade: Eudicots
- Clade: Rosids
- Order: Myrtales
- Family: Myrtaceae
- Genus: Eugenia
- Species: E. azeda

Binomial name
- Eugenia azeda Sobral

Species of plant in the myrtle family

Eugenia azeda is a species of flowering plant in the family Myrtaceae. It is a tree endemic to the state of Rio Grande do Norte in northeastern Brazil, and was first described in 2010. The tree grows to between 2 and 9 metres (6.6 and 29.5 ft) tall, and produces edible yellow fruit that are 30 mm (1.2 in) in diameter.
