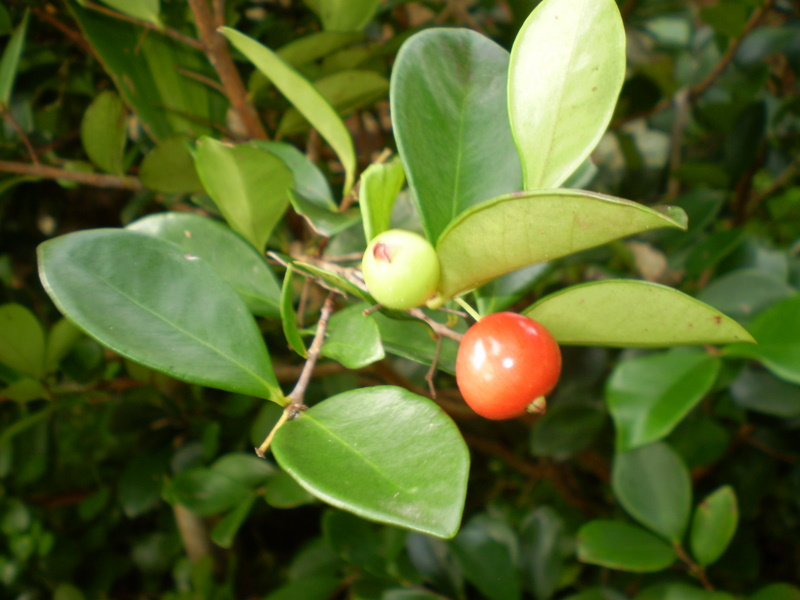

Conservation status
- Least Concern (IUCN 3.1)

Scientific classification
- Kingdom: Plantae
- Clade: Tracheophytes
- Clade: Angiosperms
- Clade: Eudicots
- Clade: Rosids
- Order: Myrtales
- Family: Myrtaceae
- Genus: Eugenia
- Species: E. reinwardtiana

Binomial name
- Eugenia reinwardtiana (Blume) DC.

Synonyms
- 16 Synonyms: Jambosa maritima Miq.; Jossinia reinwardtiana (Blume) Blume; Myrtus reinwardtiana Blume; Eugenia carissoides F.Muell.; Eugenia costenoblei Merr.; Eugenia hypospodia F.Muell.; Eugenia kangeanensis Valeton; Eugenia koolauensis var. glabra O.Deg.; Eugenia macrohila C.T.White & W.D.Francis; Eugenia rariflora Benth.; Eugenia rariflora var. parvifolia Hillebr.; Eugenia reinwardtiana f. lutea H.St.John; Eugenia waianensis O.Deg.; Jossinia costenoblei (Merr.) Diels; Jossinia desmantha Diels; Jossinia tahitensis Nadeaud

= Eugenia reinwardtiana =

Species of flowering plant

Eugenia reinwardtiana is a shrub to small tree in the family Myrtaceae. Native to tropical forests in Indonesia, the Australian state of Queensland, and many Pacific Islands, its common names include Cedar Bay cherry, beach cherry, Australian beach cherry, mountain stopper, nīoi (Hawaiian), and a'abang (Chamorro). They are typically 2 to 6 m (6.6 to 19.7 ft) in height.

The tree is particularly common around the Cedar Bay National Park in northern Australia and the edible fruit was especially popular with the hippies who lived there in the 1970s.

The fruits are green at first, then ripen to a bright orange-red colour with a sweet taste and soft flesh.

== Uses ==
The tree is cultivated to a limited extent for its edible sweetish fruit that is often eaten out-of-hand, used to flavour drinks and candies, or as a preserve. The fruit is a source of antioxidants.

The tree is well-suited to amenity horticulture in the tropics, and is grown in the median strips in Cairns. It is readily propagated from fresh seed.

This species is susceptible to myrtle rust (Austropuccinia psidii).
