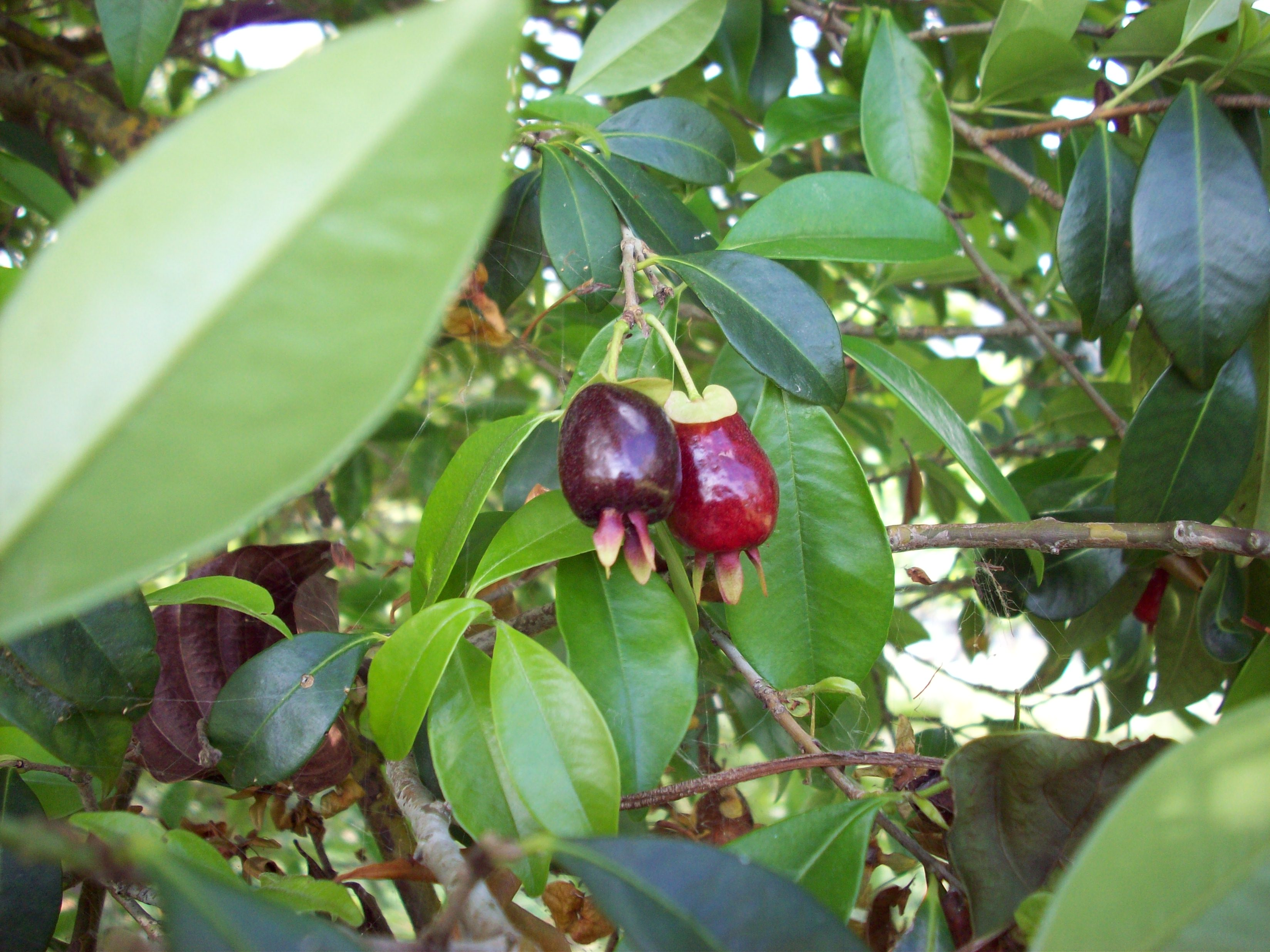

Conservation status
- Least Concern (IUCN 3.1)

Scientific classification
- Kingdom: Plantae
- Clade: Tracheophytes
- Clade: Angiosperms
- Clade: Eudicots
- Clade: Rosids
- Order: Myrtales
- Family: Myrtaceae
- Genus: Eugenia
- Species: E. involucrata

Binomial name
- Eugenia involucrata DC. (1828)

Synonyms
- List: Eugenia aemilii Barb. Rodr.; Eugenia aggregata (Vell.) Kiaersk. nom. illeg.; Eugenia bracteata Vell. nom. illeg.; Eugenia calycina Cambess; Eugenia laevigata (O.Berg) D.Legrand nom. illeg.; Eugenia minutifolia (Mattos & D.Legrand) Mattos; Eugenia pallescens Kiaersk.; Eugenia paraguayensis Barb. Rodr.; Eugenia stricta (O.Berg) Kiaersk. nom. illeg.; Eugenia strictissima Govaerts; Myrtus aggregata Vell.; Phyllocalyx cerasiflorus O.Berg nom. illeg.; Phyllocalyx involucratus (DC.) O.Berg; Phyllocalyx laevigatus O.Berg; Phyllocalyx strictus O.Berg; Stenocalyx involucratus (DC.) Kausel

= Eugenia involucrata =

Species of tree

Eugenia involucrata, the Cherry of the Rio Grande, is an evergreen shrub native to Brazil which bears small fruits that are dark red to purple in color and have a sweet cherry-like flavor. They are hardy to 20 °F (−7 °C) when mature, though younger plants should be protected from frosts.

== Range and habitat ==
Eugenia involucrata is native to Brazil (northeastern, southern, southeastern, and west-central), northeastern Argentina, Bolivia, Paraguay, and Uruguay.

It lives in a range of habitats, including savanna, grassland, forests (humid and dry), and inland rocky areas such as cliffs and mountain peaks.

== Cultural practices ==
Cherries of the Rio Grande are easy to grow, requiring relatively little maintenance for the growth of healthy, productive plants. Fruit size and quality depends to a large extent on proper nourishment and an adequate water supply at the time of fruit development. When first planted, they need a complete fertilizer in a 1-1-1 ratio, such as 6-6-6, that also contains magnesium. Start with no more than 1/4 pound at monthly or bi-monthly intervals, increasing the rates commensurate with growth. If iron deficiency in calcareous soils is a problem, this element should be applied as Sequestrene 138, injected or drenched into the soil when needed. Nutritional sprays to supply other minor elements should also be applied as needed. After the tree has matured, a fertilizer such as 8-3-9 with 5% MgO is more appropriate. The plants should be supplied with adequate water at all times but especially during bloom and fruit development. The cherry of the Rio Grande has fairly good drought tolerance. The cherry of the Rio Grande requires very little pruning to make an attractive tree and it is seldom pruned to make a hedge.

== Blooming habits ==
In Florida, the cherry of the Rio Grande starts blooming in the first part of March. The flowering season lasts a few months, occasionally until May. The flowers are white.

== Fruiting habits ==
The fruit ripens on the bush three weeks after the blossom. It is red to deep purple about 1 in (25 mm) diameter with a sweet cherry taste. The fruit can also be used for jelly, jam or juice.

== Propagation ==
This species is generally propagated by seeds. Seeds usually germinate in less than a month, but can take 5 years to produce. The better selections can be veneer grafted, or reproduced by cuttings, although grafting has a low success rate.
