= Eugenia fulva =

Conservation status
- Vulnerable (IUCN 2.3)

Scientific classification
- Kingdom: Plantae
- Clade: Tracheophytes
- Clade: Angiosperms
- Clade: Eudicots
- Clade: Rosids
- Order: Myrtales
- Family: Myrtaceae
- Genus: Eugenia
- Species: E. fulva

Binomial name
- Eugenia fulva Thwaites

Synonyms
- Eugenia floccifera Thwaites

Species of flowering plant

Eugenia fulva is a species of plant in the family Myrtaceae. It is a shrub or tree endemic to Sri Lanka.

The species was described by George Henry Kendrick Thwaites in 1859.
