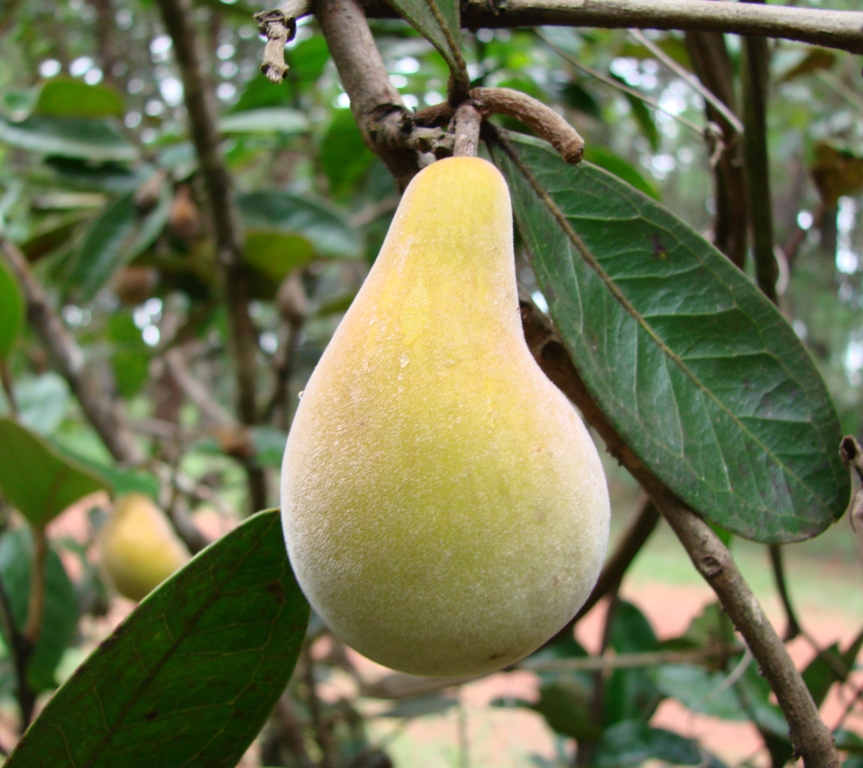

Conservation status
- Least Concern (IUCN 3.1)

Scientific classification
- Kingdom: Plantae
- Clade: Tracheophytes
- Clade: Angiosperms
- Clade: Eudicots
- Clade: Rosids
- Order: Myrtales
- Family: Myrtaceae
- Genus: Eugenia
- Species: E. klotzschiana

Binomial name
- Eugenia klotzschiana O.Berg (1857)

Synonyms
- Eugenia klotzschiana var. glabrata O.Berg

= Eugenia klotzschiana =

Species of flowering plant

Eugenia klotzschiana, or cerrado pear, is a species of plant in the family Myrtaceae. It is a shrub or tree native to Bolivia and central Brazil. It produces edible fruit.
