= Eugenia ekmanii =

Conservation status
- Endangered (IUCN 3.1)

Scientific classification
- Kingdom: Plantae
- Clade: Tracheophytes
- Clade: Angiosperms
- Clade: Eudicots
- Clade: Rosids
- Order: Myrtales
- Family: Myrtaceae
- Genus: Eugenia
- Species: E. ekmanii

Binomial name
- Eugenia ekmanii (Urb.) Flickinger

Synonyms
- Calyptranthes ekmanii Urb.; Calyptrogenia ekmanii (Urb.) Burret

Species of flowering plant

Eugenia ekmanii is a species of flowering plant in the family Myrtaceae. It is a shrub or tree native to the Massif de la Hotte in southeastern Haiti and to northeastern Jamaica. It grows in montane tropical moist forest from 800 to 1,200 metres elevation. In the Massif de la Hotte it grows in lower montane rain forest with average annual rainfall of 1,400 to 2,400 mm. In Jamaica it grows in elfin woodlands in the John Crow Mountains on soils derived from limestone, laterite and likely serpentine, at approximately 800 metres elevation with annual rainfall averaging 2,400 to 2,600 mm. Eastern Jamaica's lower montane rain forests on limestone are high in species diversity and endemic flora and fauna species.

The species is threatened by habitat loss, and the IUCN Red List assesses it as endangered.
