= Neidalia orientalis =

Scientific classification
- Domain: Eukaryota
- Kingdom: Animalia
- Phylum: Arthropoda
- Class: Insecta
- Order: Lepidoptera
- Superfamily: Noctuoidea
- Family: Erebidae
- Subfamily: Arctiinae
- Genus: Neidalia
- Species: N. orientalis

Binomial name
- Neidalia orientalis Rothschild, 1933

Species of insect

Neidalia orientalis is a moth of the family Erebidae first described by Walter Rothschild. It was described in 1933, and is found in Brazil.
