= Eupseudosoma agramma =

Scientific classification
- Kingdom: Animalia
- Phylum: Arthropoda
- Class: Insecta
- Order: Lepidoptera
- Superfamily: Noctuoidea
- Family: Erebidae
- Subfamily: Arctiinae
- Genus: Eupseudosoma
- Species: E. agramma

Binomial name
- Eupseudosoma agramma Hampson, 1901

Species of moth

Eupseudosoma agramma is a moth of the family Erebidae first described by George Hampson in 1901. It is found in Mexico.
