= Neidalia dognini =

Scientific classification
- Domain: Eukaryota
- Kingdom: Animalia
- Phylum: Arthropoda
- Class: Insecta
- Order: Lepidoptera
- Superfamily: Noctuoidea
- Family: Erebidae
- Subfamily: Arctiinae
- Genus: Neidalia
- Species: N. dognini

Binomial name
- Neidalia dognini Rothschild, 1909

Species of moth

Neidalia dognini is a moth of the family Erebidae first described by Walter Rothschild in 1909. It is found in French Guiana, Peru, Costa Rica and Hispaniola.
