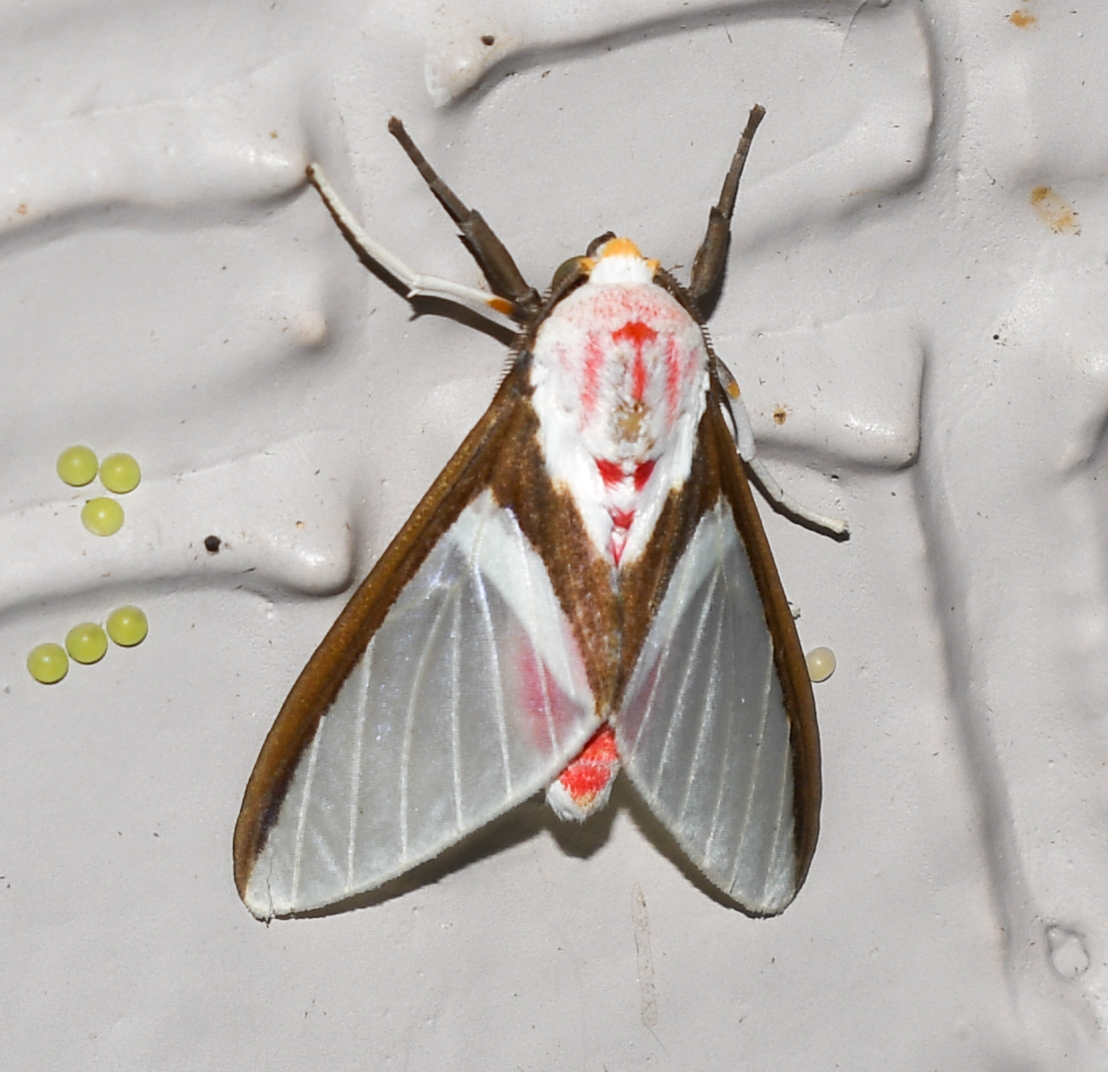

Scientific classification
- Domain: Eukaryota
- Kingdom: Animalia
- Phylum: Arthropoda
- Class: Insecta
- Order: Lepidoptera
- Superfamily: Noctuoidea
- Family: Erebidae
- Subfamily: Arctiinae
- Genus: Eupseudosoma
- Species: E. larissa

Binomial name
- Eupseudosoma larissa (H. Druce, 1890)

Synonyms
- Idalus larissa H. Druce, 1890; Automolis larissa

= Eupseudosoma larissa =

Species of moth

Eupseudosoma larissa is a moth of the family Erebidae first described by Herbert Druce in 1890. It is found in the Amazon region.

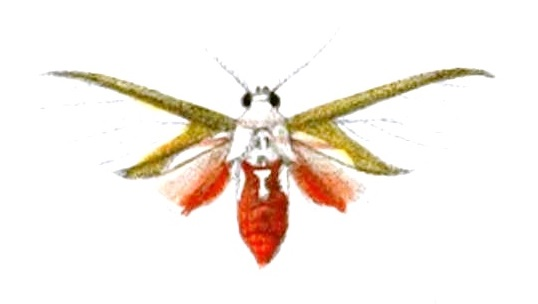
Illustration
