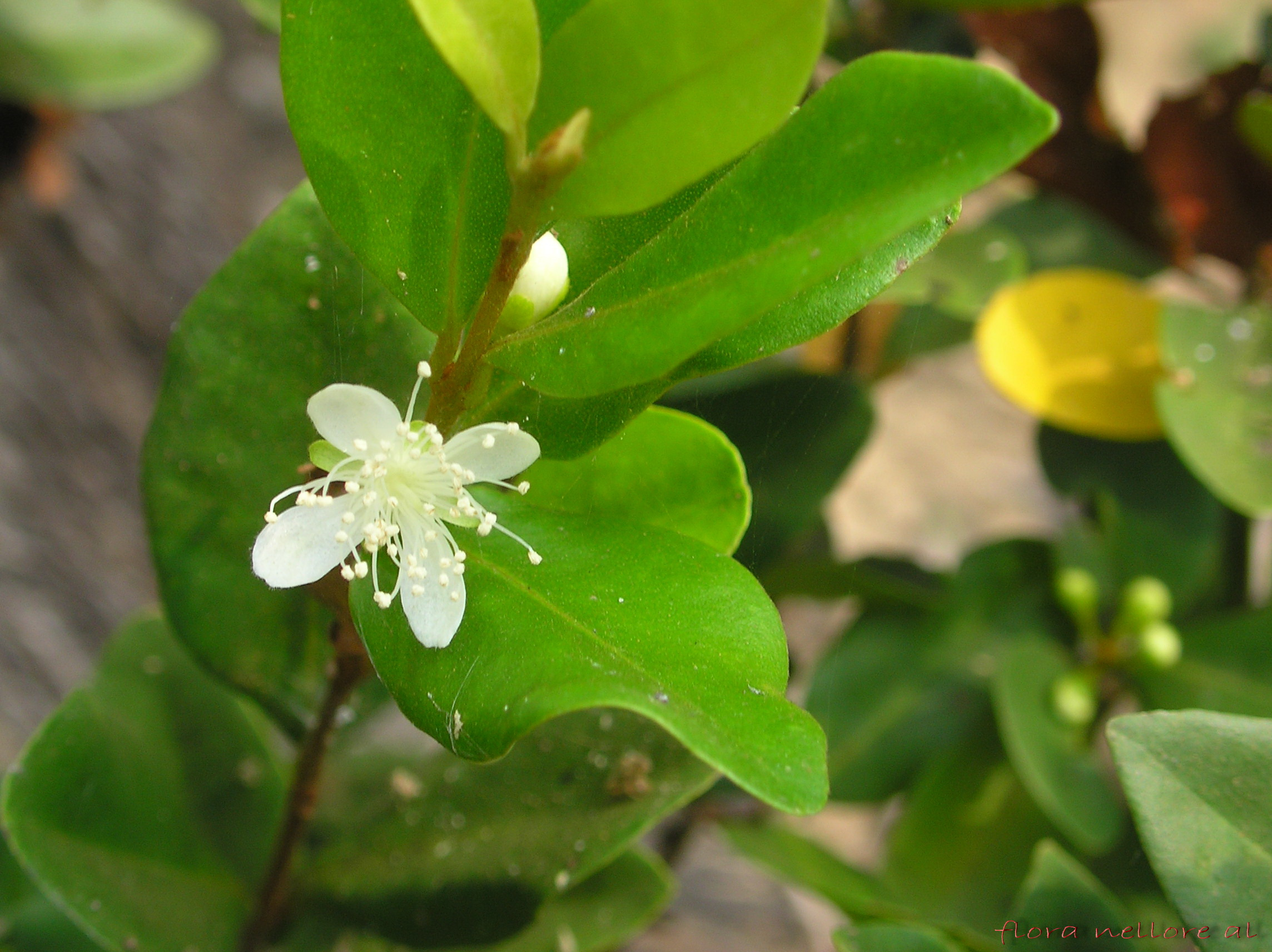
- Flower

Scientific classification
- Kingdom: Plantae
- Clade: Tracheophytes
- Clade: Angiosperms
- Clade: Eudicots
- Clade: Rosids
- Order: Myrtales
- Family: Myrtaceae
- Genus: Eugenia
- Species: E. roxburghii

Binomial name
- Eugenia roxburghii DC.

Synonyms
- List: Eugenia bracteata (Willd.) Raeusch. ex DC. [Illegitimate]; Eugenia bracteata var. fasciculata (Wall. ex Blume) Duthie; Eugenia bracteata var. roxburghii (DC.) Duthie; Eugenia fasciculata Wall. ex Blume; Eugenia heynei Rathakr. & N.C.Nair A; Eugenia macrosepala Duthie; Eugenia rothii Panigrahi [Illegitimate]; Eugenia rothii var. fasciculata (Duthie) H.B.Naithani; Eugenia willdenowii Wight [Illegitimate]; Eugenia zeylanica Roxb. [Illegitimate]; Myrtus bracteata Willd.; Myrtus coromandelina J.König ex Roxb. [Invalid]; Myrtus heynei Spreng. [Illegitimate]; Myrtus latifolia B.Heyne ex Roth; Myrtus littoralis Roxb. ex Wight & Arn.; Myrtus quadripartita Royen ex Blume; Myrtus ruscifolia Willd.; Syzygium bracteatum (Willd.) Raizada; Syzygium latifolium Blanco [Illegitimate]; Syzygium ruscifolium (Willd.) Santapau & Wagh

= Eugenia roxburghii =

Species of flowering plant

Eugenia roxburghii (commonly known as Roxburgh's Cherry) is a species of plant in the family Myrtaceae which is native to India and Sri Lanka. It is a 5 metres (16 ft) tall tree with round, rough, brown branches. Leaves are shiny green in color which are oppositely arranged. Flowers are white in color and have four-petals. Fruit is a deep orange-colored berry. Flowering starts on March and ends with late April.
