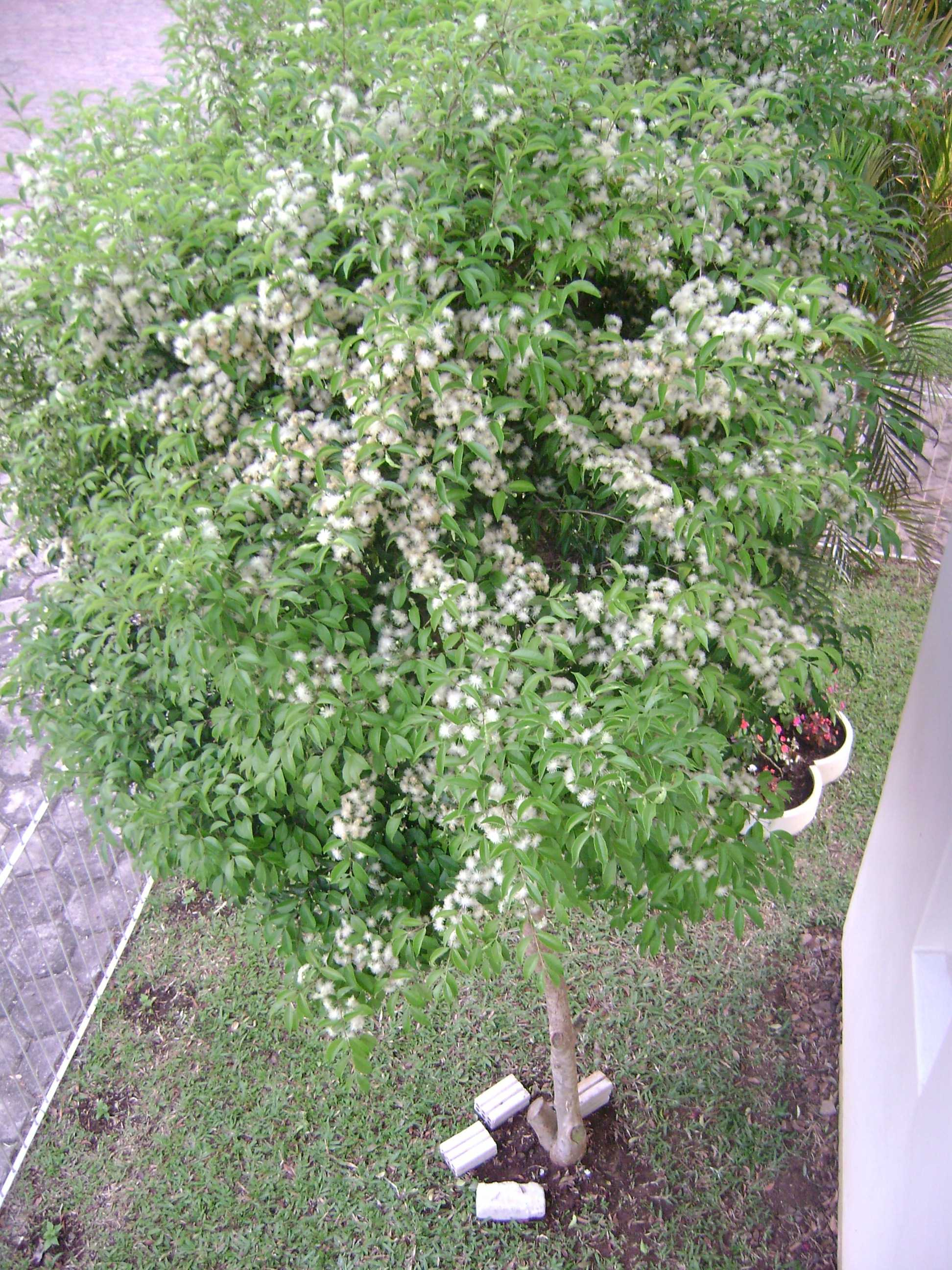
- Eugenia uruguayensis

Conservation status
- Least Concern (IUCN 3.1)

Scientific classification
- Kingdom: Plantae
- Clade: Tracheophytes
- Clade: Angiosperms
- Clade: Eudicots
- Clade: Rosids
- Order: Myrtales
- Family: Myrtaceae
- Genus: Eugenia
- Species: E. uruguayensis

Binomial name
- Eugenia uruguayensis Cambess.

Synonyms
- List: Eugenia batucaryensis O.Berg; Eugenia calycosema O.Berg; Eugenia guabiju O.Berg; Eugenia maschalantha O.Berg; Eugenia opaca O.Berg, nom. illeg.; Eugenia opaca var. brasiliensis O.Berg; Eugenia opaca var. montevideensis O.Berg; Eugenia uruguayensis var. opaca (O.Berg) D.Legrand; Luma calycosema (O.Berg) Herter; Luma opaca (O.Berg) Herter; Luma uruguayensis (Cambess.) Herter

= Eugenia uruguayensis =

Species of flowering plant

Eugenia uruguayensis is a species of flowering plant in the family Myrtaceae. It is a tree native to central and southern Brazil, northeastern Argentina, Paraguay, and Uruguay.
