= Eugenia fernandopoana =

Conservation status
- Vulnerable (IUCN 3.1)

Scientific classification
- Kingdom: Plantae
- Clade: Tracheophytes
- Clade: Angiosperms
- Clade: Eudicots
- Clade: Rosids
- Order: Myrtales
- Family: Myrtaceae
- Genus: Eugenia
- Species: E. fernandopoana

Binomial name
- Eugenia fernandopoana Engl. & Brehmer

Species of flowering plant

Eugenia fernandopoana is a species of flowering plant in the family Myrtaceae. It is a shrub or tree native to Côte d'Ivoire in West Africa and Bioko, Cameroon, Republic of the Congo, and Gabon in west-central Africa. Its natural habitat tropical moist lowland forests. It is threatened by habitat loss.
