= Eugenia mabaeoides =

Conservation status
- Endangered (IUCN 3.1)

Scientific classification
- Kingdom: Plantae
- Clade: Tracheophytes
- Clade: Angiosperms
- Clade: Eudicots
- Clade: Rosids
- Order: Myrtales
- Family: Myrtaceae
- Genus: Eugenia
- Species: E. mabaeoides

Binomial name
- Eugenia mabaeoides Wight.

Species of flowering plant

Eugenia mabaeoides is a species of plant in the Myrtaceae. It is found only in Sri Lanka.
