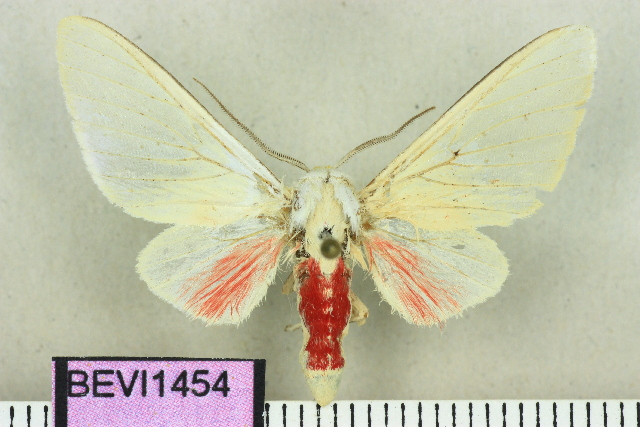

Scientific classification
- Domain: Eukaryota
- Kingdom: Animalia
- Phylum: Arthropoda
- Class: Insecta
- Order: Lepidoptera
- Superfamily: Noctuoidea
- Family: Erebidae
- Subfamily: Arctiinae
- Genus: Eupseudosoma
- Species: E. involutum

Binomial name
- Eupseudosoma involutum (Sepp, [1855])

Synonyms
- Phalaena involuta Sepp, [1855]; Charidea nivea Herrich-Schäffer, [1855]; Eupseudosoma niveum Grote, [1866]; Eupseudosoma floridum Grote, 1882; Euchaetes immaculata Graef, 1887; Eupseudosoma ab. flavida Dognin, 1911; Eupseudosoma involuta (Sepp, [1855])

= Eupseudosoma involutum =

Snowy eupseudosoma

Species of moth

Eupseudosoma involutum, the snowy eupseudosoma, is a moth of the family Erebidae. The species was first described by Sepp in 1855. It is found from the southern United States (Florida) to Argentina, as well as on the Antilles.

The wingspan is about 33 mm.

The larvae feed on Psidium guineense, Eugenia and Eucalyptus species.
