= Neidalia eurygania =

Scientific classification
- Domain: Eukaryota
- Kingdom: Animalia
- Phylum: Arthropoda
- Class: Insecta
- Order: Lepidoptera
- Superfamily: Noctuoidea
- Family: Erebidae
- Subfamily: Arctiinae
- Genus: Neidalia
- Species: N. eurygania

Binomial name
- Neidalia eurygania (H. Druce, 1897)

Synonyms
- Eupseudosoma eurygania (H. Druce, 1897); Halysidota eurygania H. Druce, 1897

Species of moth

Neidalia eurygania is a moth of the family Erebidae first described by Herbert Druce in 1897. It is found in Panama.
