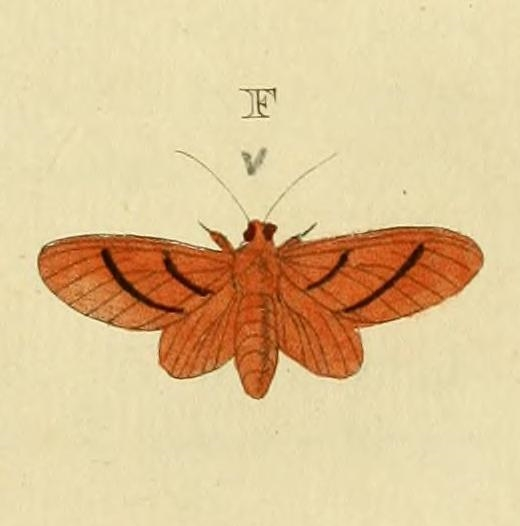

Scientific classification
- Domain: Eukaryota
- Kingdom: Animalia
- Phylum: Arthropoda
- Class: Insecta
- Order: Lepidoptera
- Superfamily: Noctuoidea
- Family: Erebidae
- Subfamily: Arctiinae
- Genus: Neidalia
- Species: N. bifasciata

Binomial name
- Neidalia bifasciata (Cramer, 1779)

Synonyms
- Eupseudosoma bifasciata (Cramer, 1779); Phalaena bifasciata (Cramer, 1779)

= Neidalia bifasciata =

Species of moth

Neidalia bifasciata is a moth of the family Erebidae first described by Pieter Cramer in 1779. It is found in Suriname.
