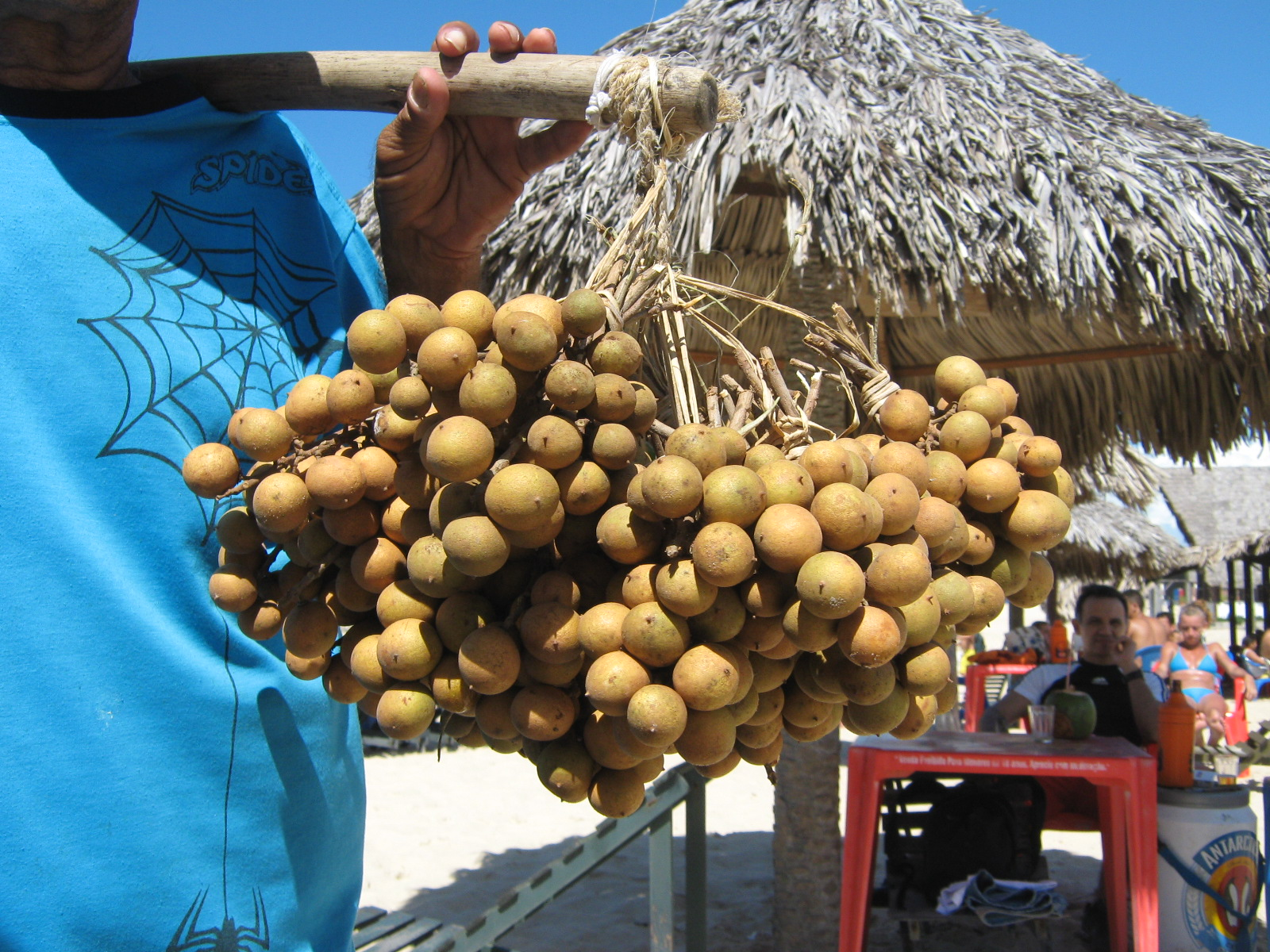

Scientific classification
- Kingdom: Plantae
- Clade: Tracheophytes
- Clade: Angiosperms
- Clade: Eudicots
- Clade: Rosids
- Order: Sapindales
- Family: Sapindaceae
- Genus: Talisia
- Species: T. esculenta

Binomial name
- Talisia esculenta Radlk.

= Talisia esculenta =

Species of plant

Talisia esculenta is a medium-sized tree native to the Amazon Basin, and is found in Brazil, Colombia, Peru, Paraguay and Bolivia.

The tree and fruit are called pitomba in English, Portuguese and Spanish, olho-de-boi, pitomba-rana and pitomba-de-macaco in Portuguese, pitoulier comestible in French, cotopalo in Spanish and karajá bola in Guarani. Pitomba is also used as the name for Eugenia luschnathiana.

== Description ==
Talisia esculenta can grow to a height of 9–20 m (30–66 ft), with a trunk up to 45 cm (18 in) diameter. The leaves are arranged alternately, pinnately compound, with 5–11 leaflets, the leaflets 5–12 cm (2.0–4.7 in) long and 2–5 cm (0.8–2 in) broad.

The flowers are produced in a panicle 10–15 cm (4–6 in) long, the individual flowers small and white. The fruit is round to ellipsoid in shape, 1.5–4 cm (0.6–2 in) in diameter. Beneath the outer peel is the white, translucent, sweet-sour pulp with one or two large, elongated seeds.

== Uses ==
The fruit is eaten fresh and used to make juice. The sap is used as a fish poison.

== See also ==
- Longan, a visually similar fruit from Asia
