= Eupseudosoma aberrans =

Scientific classification
- Domain: Eukaryota
- Kingdom: Animalia
- Phylum: Arthropoda
- Class: Insecta
- Order: Lepidoptera
- Superfamily: Noctuoidea
- Family: Erebidae
- Subfamily: Arctiinae
- Genus: Eupseudosoma
- Species: E. aberrans

Binomial name
- Eupseudosoma aberrans Schaus, 1905

Species of moth

Eupseudosoma aberrans is a moth of the family Erebidae first described by William Schaus in 1905. It is found in Mexico.
