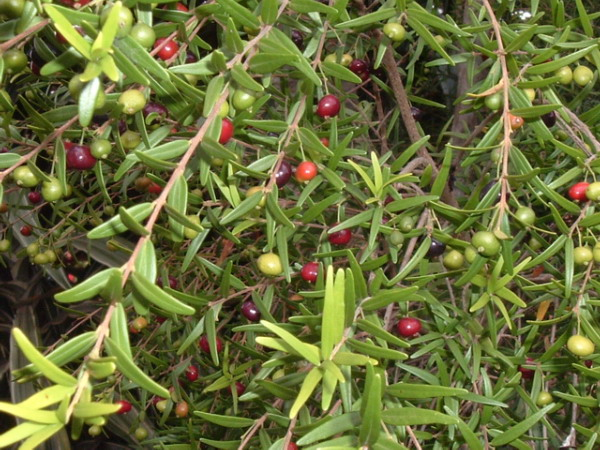
- Eugenia sprengelii

Scientific classification
- Kingdom: Plantae
- Clade: Tracheophytes
- Clade: Angiosperms
- Clade: Eudicots
- Clade: Rosids
- Order: Myrtales
- Family: Myrtaceae
- Subfamily: Myrtoideae
- Tribe: Myrteae
- Genus: Eugenia; P.Micheli ex L.

Type species
- Eugenia uniflora L.

Species
- Over 1,100; see list of Eugenia species

Synonyms
- List: Calomyrtus Blume nom. inval.; Calophylloides Smeathman ex DC.; Calyptrogenia Burret; Catinga Aubl.; Chloromyrtus Pierre; Emurtia Raf.; Epleienda Raf.; Eplejenda Post & Kuntze; Greggia Gaertn. nom. illeg.; Hexachlamys O.Berg; Hottea Urb.; Jossinia Comm. ex DC.; Meteoromyrtus Gamble; Monimiastrum J.Guého & A.J.Scott; Myrcialeucus Rojas; Myrtopsis O.Hoffm.; Olynthia Lindl.; Stenocalyx O.Berg; Stereocaryum Burret

= Eugenia =

Genus of flowering plants in the myrtle family

Eugenia is a genus of flowering plants in the myrtle family Myrtaceae. It has a worldwide, although highly uneven, distribution in tropical and subtropical regions. The bulk of the approximately 1,100 species occur in the New World tropics, especially in the northern Andes, the Caribbean, and the Atlantic Forest. Other centers of diversity include New Caledonia and Madagascar. Many species in the Old World have received a new classification into the genus Syzygium.

All species are woody evergreen trees and shrubs. Several are grown as ornamental plants for their attractive glossy foliage, and a few produce edible fruit that are eaten fresh or used in jams and jellies.

== Taxonomy ==
The genus was named in honor of Prince Eugene of Savoy.

Many species new to science have been and are in the process of being described from these regions. For example, 37 new species of Eugenia have been described from Mesoamerica in the past few years. At least 20 new species are currently being described from New Caledonia, and approximately the same number of species new to science may occur in Madagascar. Despite the enormous ecological importance of the myrtle family in Australia (e.g. Eucalyptus, Corymbia, Angophora, Melaleuca, Callistemon, Rhodamnia, Gossia), only one species of Eugenia, E. reinwardtiana, occurs on that continent. The genus also is represented in Africa south of the Sahara, but it is relatively species-poor on that continent. In the past some botanists included the morphologically similar Old World genus Syzygium in Eugenia, but research by Rudolf Schmid in the early 1970s convinced most botanists that the genera are easily separable. Research by van Wyk and colleagues in South Africa suggests the genus may comprise at least two major lineages, recognizable by anatomical and other features.

Molecular phylogenetic studies have changed the historical circumscription of the genus. Many species formerly placed in Eugenia have been moved to Syzygium. Two others have been reassigned to Pimenta. The Caribbean genera Hottea, Calyptrogenia and Pseudanamomis were shown to be embedded in Eugenia. The monotypic Indian genus Meteoromyrtus was also found to be part of Eugenia.

=== Species ===
Selected species include:

- Eugenia angustissima O.Berg – needle-leaf cherry
- Eugenia azeda M.Sobral – feijoa pitanga
- Eugenia brasiliensis Lam. – grumichama (Brazil)
- Eugenia calycina Cambess. - savannah cherry
- Eugenia candolleana – rainforest plum
- Eugenia capensis – dune myrtle, Eastern Cape myrtle (South Africa)
- Eugenia cerasiflora Miq.
- Eugenia cereja D.Legrand – mountain cherry
- Eugenia copacabanensis – Copacabana Beach pitanga (Atlantic Coast restingas in the state of Rio de Janeiro, Brazil)
- Eugenia coronata
- Eugenia dysenterica DC. a.k.a. Stenocalyx dysentericus O.Berg
- Eugenia earthiana (Costa Rica)
- Eugenia ekmanii
- Eugenia fernandopoana
- Eugenia florida – rainforest cherry, guamirim cereja
- Eugenia foetida
- Eugenia fulva
- Eugenia involucrata – cherry of the Rio Grande
- Eugenia klotzschiana O.Berg – cerrado pear
- Eugenia koolauensis O.Deg – Koʻolau eugenia, nioi (Islands of Molokaʻi and Oʻahu in Hawaii)
- Eugenia lamprophylla
- Eugenia luschnathiana Klotzsch & O.Berg – Bahia pitomba (Bahia, Brazil), not to be confused with Talisia esculenta
- Eugenia mabaeoides Wight.
- Eugenia neomyrtifolia
- Eugenia orbiculata
- Eugenia palumbis – agatelang
- Eugenia petrikensis
- Eugenia pitanga (O.Berg ex Mart.) Kiaersk. – pitanga-peba, creeping pitanga
- Eugenia punicifolia (Kunth) DC.
- Eugenia pyriformis Brazil – uvaia, uvalha
- Eugenia pruniformis Brazil – azeitoninha-da-praia (little beach olive)
- Eugenia reinwardtiana (Blume) DC. – mountain stopper, Cedar Bay cherry, beach cherry (Queensland in Australia, Indonesia, Pacific Islands)
- Eugenia repanda – pitanga-jambo
- Eugenia roxburghii DC.
- Eugenia selloi – pitanga-tuba, pitangola
- Eugenia sellowiana – field uvaia, field perinha, sweet uvainha
- Eugenia singampattiana Beddome
- Eugenia speciosa – ibaijuba, bush orange
- Eugenia stipitata McVaugh – arazá-boi (Amazon rainforest)
- Eugenia subterminalis – bush cherry, smooth pitanga of the shade
- Eugenia sulcata – pitanga-preta
- Eugenia tenuipedunculata D.Legrand (Brazil)
- Eugenia truncata
- Eugenia umtamvunensis (South Africa)
- Eugenia uniflora L. – Suriname cherry, pitanga (Neotropics)
- Eugenia uruguayensis Cambess.
- Eugenia victoriana – guayabilla (northern South America)

== Ecology ==
Eugenia species are sometimes used as food plants by the larvae of hepialid moths of the genera Aenetus (including A. splendens) and Endoclita (including E. damor and E. malabaricus). Aenetus species burrow horizontally into the trunk then vertically down. Other Lepidoptera larvae which feed on Eugenia include Eupseudosoma aberrans and the snowy eupseudosoma.
