= Cereus yungasensis =

Scientific classification
- Kingdom: Plantae
- Clade: Tracheophytes
- Clade: Angiosperms
- Clade: Eudicots
- Order: Caryophyllales
- Family: Cactaceae
- Subfamily: Cactoideae
- Genus: Cereus
- Species: C. yungasensis

Binomial name
- Cereus yungasensis A.Fuentes & Quispe

Species of flowering plant

Cereus yungasensis is a species of plant in the family Cactaceae.

== Description ==
Cereus yungasensis is noted to be closely related to Cereus trigonodendron. Cereus yungasensis is a tall growing (up to 40 ft tall), tree-like cactus with long stems. Unlike other Cereus, Cereus yungasensis commonly has 3 ribs, though the range is 3-4. Fruits are ellipsoid, scaleless and greenish to yellow. Cereus yungasensis can be reliably differentiated form Cereus trigonodendron via size of stem and number of ribs. Cereus yungasensis is typically less robust and has less ribs.

== Taxonomy ==
Cereus yungasensis was once thought to be the Bolivian population cereus trigonodendron. The Bolivian population was based on a singular specimen collected of dubious origin. Now it is widely believed that the specimen was an individual of Cereus yungasensis. Some sources also say Cereus yungasensis is a synonym of Pterocereus gaumeri, but it's likely a mistake
