= Cereus haitiensis =

Cereus haitiensis may refer to:

- Cereus haitiensis (K.Schum.) Schelle – a synonym of Selenicereus grandiflorus subsp. grandiflorus
- Cereus haitiensis A.R.Franck & Peguero – a synonym of Cereus serruliflorus
