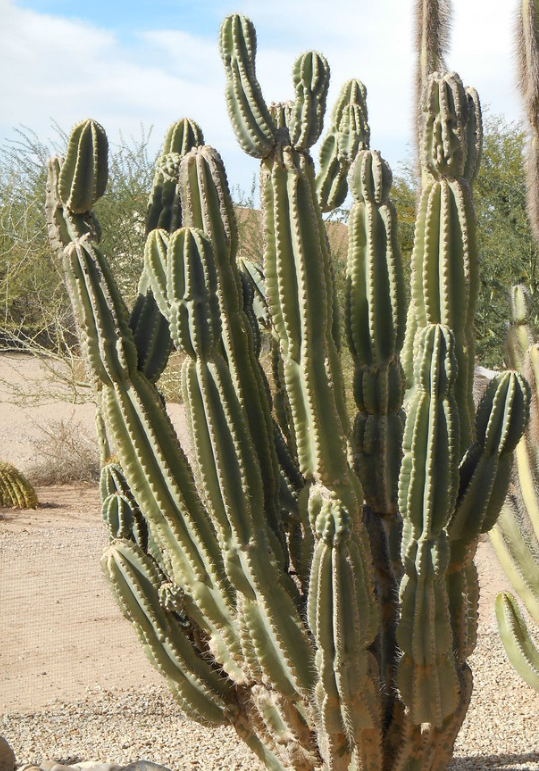

Scientific classification
- Kingdom: Plantae
- Clade: Tracheophytes
- Clade: Angiosperms
- Clade: Eudicots
- Order: Caryophyllales
- Family: Cactaceae
- Subfamily: Cactoideae
- Genus: Cereus
- Species: C. lamprospermus

Binomial name
- Cereus lamprospermus K.Schum.

Synonyms
- Cereus colosseus (F.Ritter) Guiggi; Cereus grandicostatus Werderm.; Piptanthocereus colosseus F.Ritter; Piptanthocereus lamprospermus (K.Schum.) F.Ritter

= Cereus lamprospermus =

Species of plant in the cactus family

Cereus lamprospermus is a species of cactus in the subfamily Cactoideae, native to Bolivia and Paraguay. C. lamprospermus subsp. colosseus reaches 50 ft (15 m), while C. lamprospermus subsp. lamprospermus only reaches 30 ft (9 m).

== Subtaxa ==
The following subspecies are accepted:

- Cereus lamprospermus subsp. colosseus (F.Ritter) P.J.Braun & Esteves – Bolivia
- Cereus lamprospermus subsp. lamprospermus – Bolivia, Paraguay
