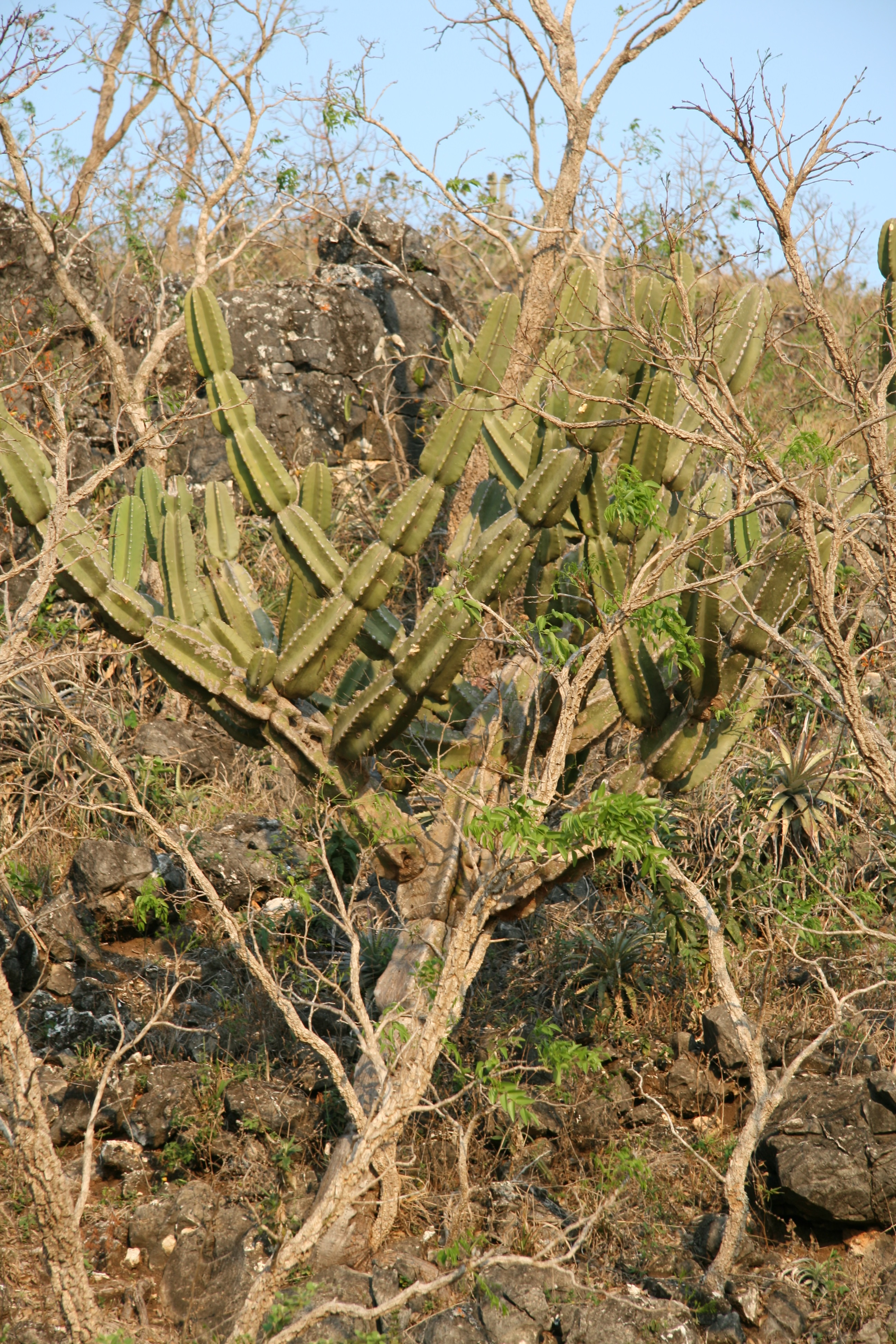

Conservation status
- Least Concern (IUCN 2.3)

Scientific classification
- Kingdom: Plantae
- Clade: Tracheophytes
- Clade: Angiosperms
- Clade: Eudicots
- Order: Caryophyllales
- Family: Cactaceae
- Subfamily: Cactoideae
- Genus: Cereus
- Species: C. lanosus

Binomial name
- Cereus lanosus (F. Ritter) P.J. Braun 1988

= Cereus lanosus =

Species of cactus

Cereus lanosus or is a species of columnar cactus found in Central, Cordillera, Concepción, and Paraguarí departments of Paraguay. The plant is found growing in rocky hills at elevations of 250 and 300 meters.

== Description ==
Cereus lanosus grows as a shrub with richly branched, semi-decumbent shoots and can reach heights of growth of up to 1.5 meters. The long, cylindrical, blue-green shoots have a diameter of 5 to 7 centimeters. There are five to seven ribs that are up to 2.5 centimeters high. The circular areoles on it are covered with long white wool. The resulting 10 to 14 straight, needle-like thorns are orange and have a reddish base. They 4 to 10 millimeters long. It has white flowers and reproduces by seeds or cuttings.

== Distribution ==
Cereus lanosus is distributed in the Brazilian state of Mato Grosso do Sul and in Paraguay in the Cordillera Department.

== Taxonomy ==
The first description as Piptanthocereus lanosus was published in 1979 by Friedrich Ritter. Pierre Josef Braun placed the species in the genus Cereus in 1988.

The species is classified as Least Concern (LC) in the IUCN Red List of Threatened Species.
