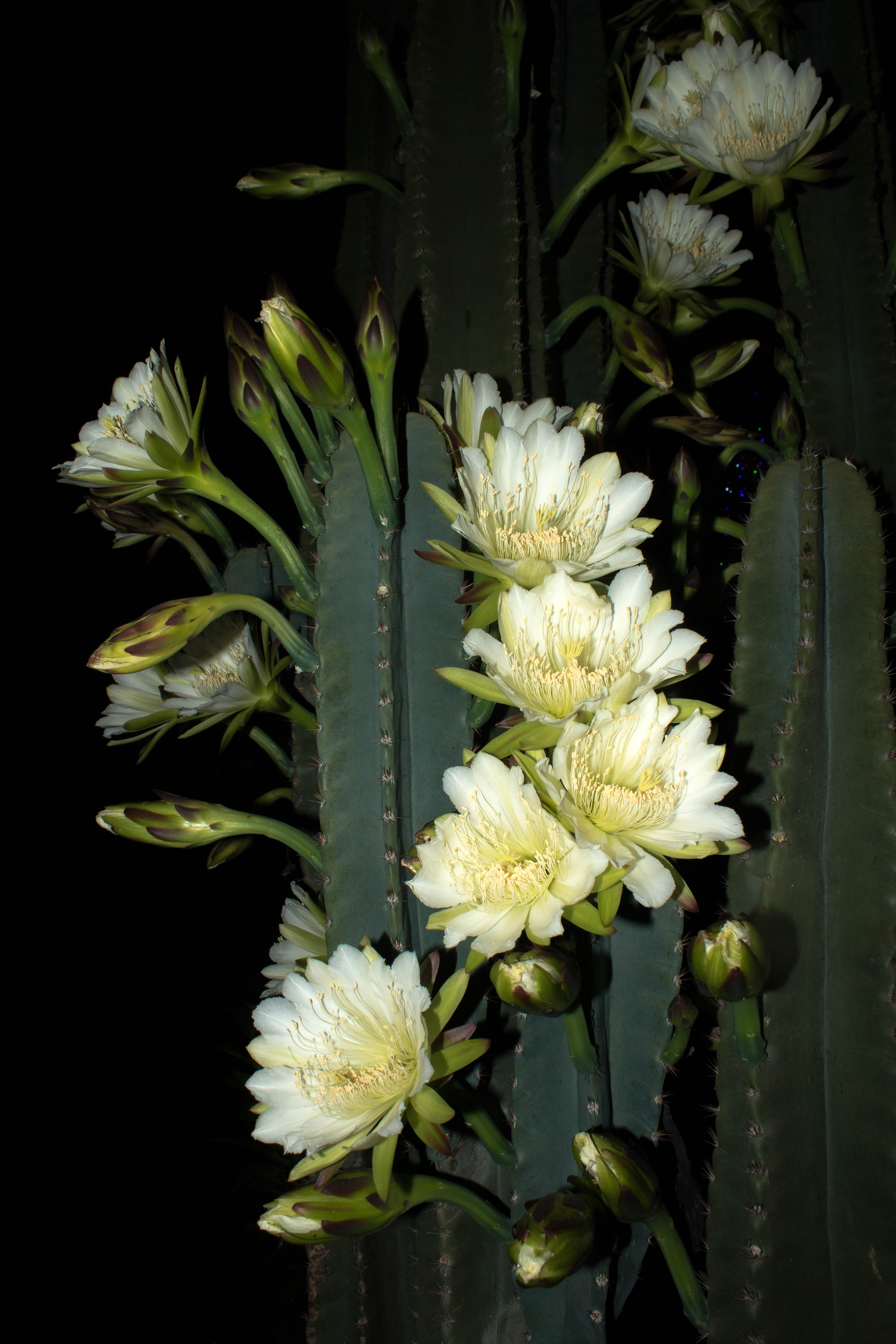

Conservation status
- Vulnerable (IUCN 2.3)

Scientific classification
- Kingdom: Plantae
- Clade: Tracheophytes
- Clade: Angiosperms
- Clade: Eudicots
- Order: Caryophyllales
- Family: Cactaceae
- Subfamily: Cactoideae
- Genus: Cereus
- Species: C. vargasianus

Binomial name
- Cereus vargasianus Cárdenas 1951

= Cereus vargasianus =

Species of cactus

Cereus vargasianus is a species of columnar cactus found in Peru.

== Description ==
Cereus vargasianus grows tree-shaped, is often branched and reaches heights of 7 to 8 meters. A short trunk is formed. The cylindrical, glaucous green shoots are divided into segments up to 50 cm (20 in) long. There are four to five squashed, wavy ribs that are up to two inches high. The gray areoles on it are elongated. The nine to ten spread, strong thorns are brownish. They cannot always be differentiated into central and radial spines. The three to four central spines are 7 to 15 mm (0.28 to 0.59 in) long. The radial spines reach a length of up to 1 cm (0.39 in).

The white flowers are 8 to 10 inches long. The up to 8 cm (3.1 in) long yellow fruits are ellipsoid and contain a white pulp.

== Distribution ==
Cereus vargasianus is distributed in the Department of Cusco of Peru.

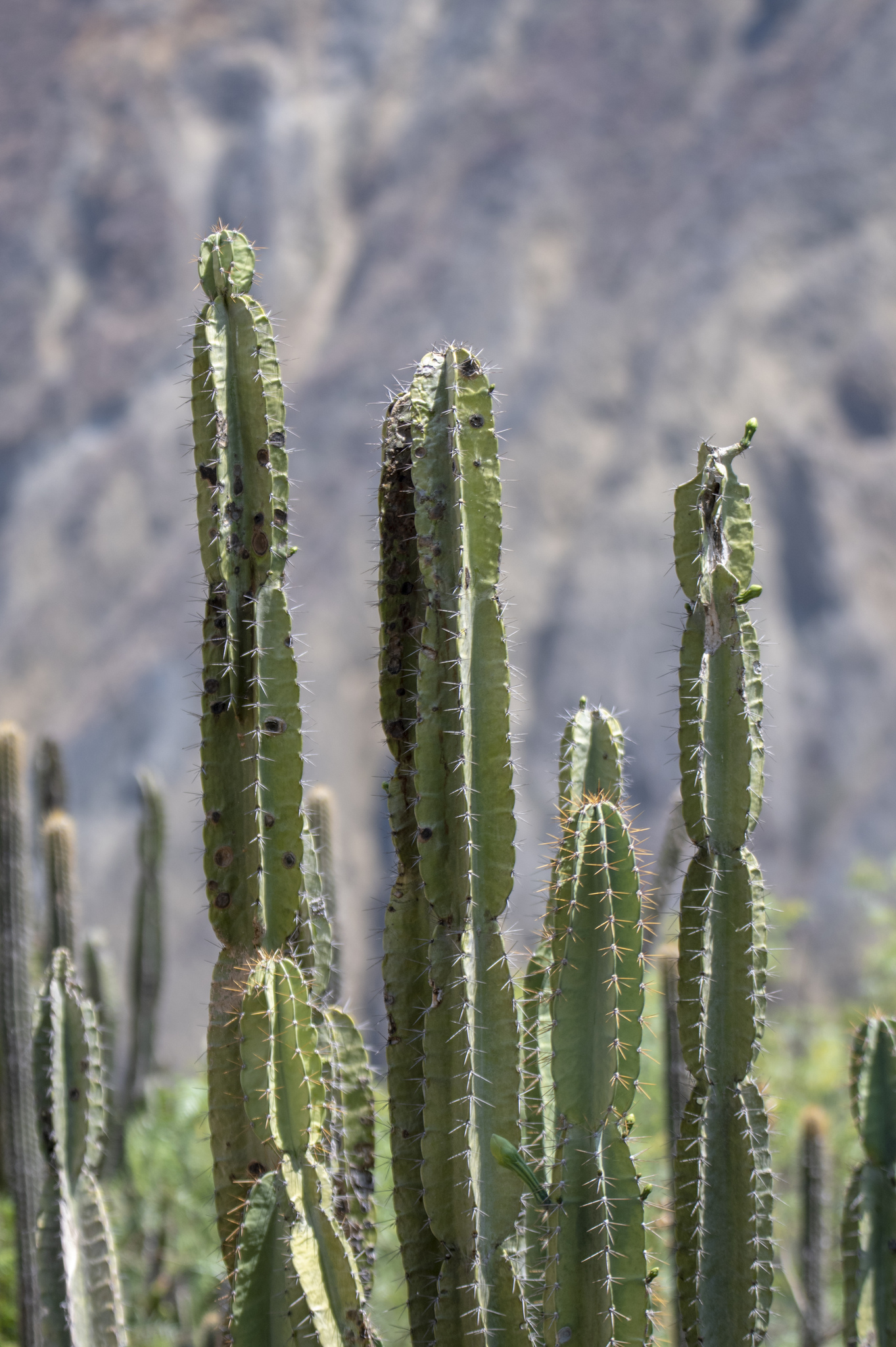
Plant growing in habitat in Hacienda Matara, Peru

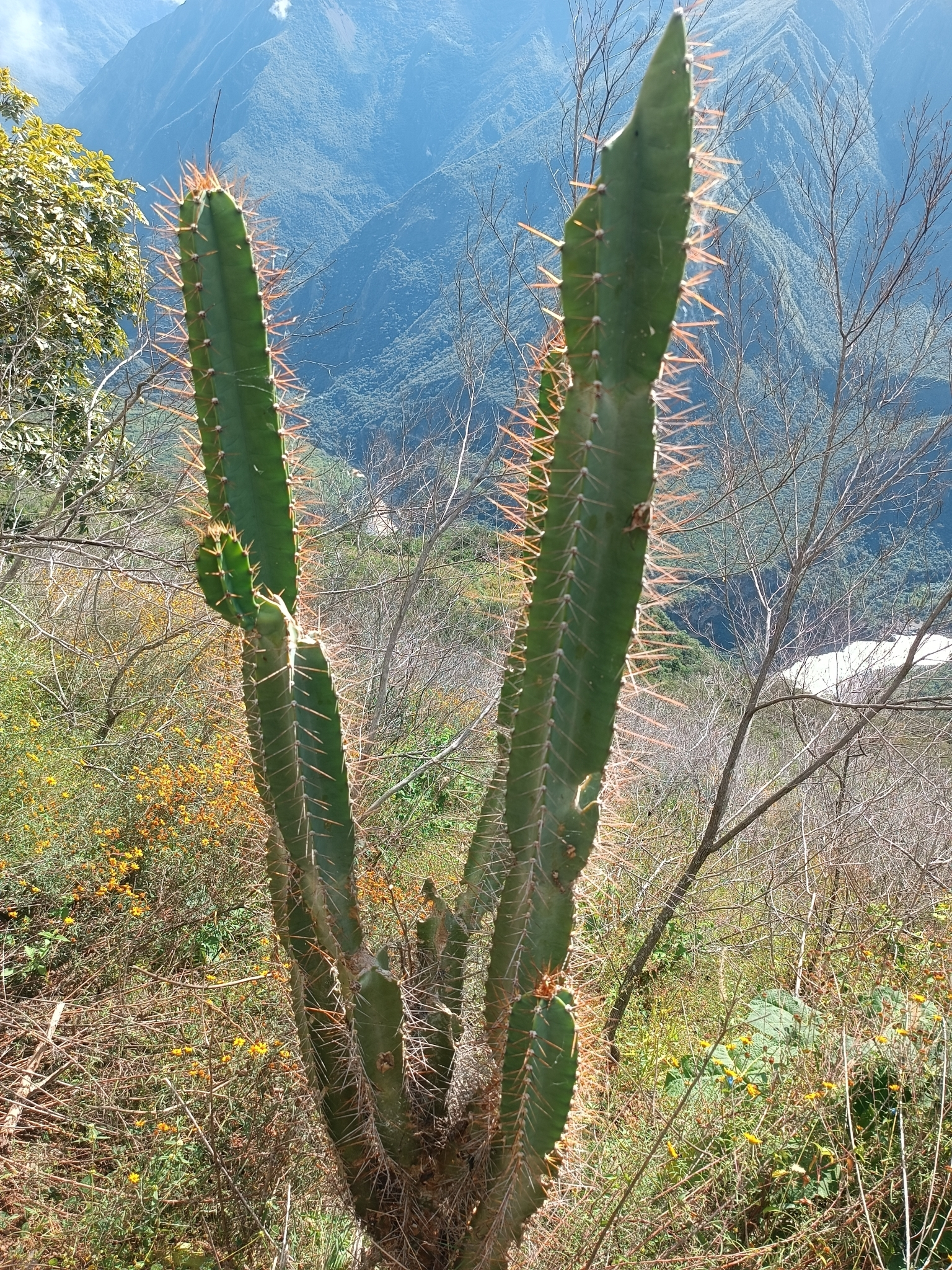
Plant growing in Ayacucho, Peru

== Taxonomy ==
The first description was published in 1951 by Martín Cárdenas who named the plant in honor of Julio César Vargas Calderón.
