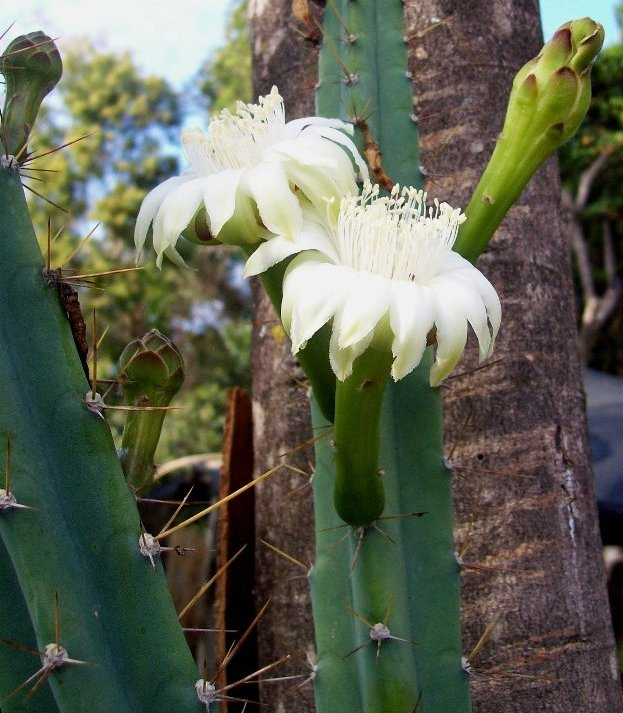

Conservation status
- Least Concern (IUCN 3.1)

Scientific classification
- Kingdom: Plantae
- Clade: Tracheophytes
- Clade: Angiosperms
- Clade: Eudicots
- Order: Caryophyllales
- Family: Cactaceae
- Subfamily: Cactoideae
- Genus: Cereus
- Species: C. phatnospermus

Binomial name
- Cereus phatnospermus K.Schum.

Synonyms
- Cereus adelmarii (Rizzini & A.Mattos) P.J.Braun; Cereus kroenleinii N.P.Taylor; Cereus phatnospermus subsp. adelmarii (Rizzini & A.Mattos) P.J.Braun & Esteves; Cereus phatnospermus subsp. kroenleinii (N.P.Taylor) P.J.Braun & Esteves; Monvillea adelmari Rizzini & A.Mattos; Monvillea kroenleinii R.Kiesling; Monvillea phatnosperma (K.Schum.) Britton & Rose; Monvillea phatnosperma subsp. adelmarii (Rizzini & A.Mattos) Lodé; Monvillea phatnosperma var. arenasii Oakley & R.Kiesling; Monvillea phatnosperma subsp. kroenleinii (N.P.Taylor) Lodé

= Cereus phatnospermus =

Species of cactus

Cereus phatnospermus, synonym Cereus kroenleinii, is a species of columnar cactus found in Brazil, Bolivia, and Paraguay.

== Description ==
Cereus phatnospermus grows shrubby with creeping or ascending shoots. The long, cylindrical, dark green, strongly glaucid shoots are initially square in cross-section and later almost circular. They are 1 to 4 meters long and have a diameter of up to 2.5 centimeters. There are four, rarely five, ribs present, which are clearly divided into bumps. The circular areoles on it have long, woolly hair. The otherwise separate areoles flow together in the area of the shoot tip. The very thin, needle-like prickly spines are dark brown with a yellow base. The single central spine is 2 to 3 centimeters long. The five radial spines are up to 1.5 centimeters long. The lowest radial spine is the shortest.

The white flowers are 9 to 10 centimeters long. Their bracts have pink tips. The egg-shaped, ruby-red fruits are tinged with purple and are up to 3.7 centimeters long.

== Distribution ==
Cereus kroenleinii is distributed in Brazil in Mato Grosso do Sul, Paraguay, in eastern Bolivia and in northern Argentina.

== Taxonomy ==
The first description was published in 1994 by Roberto Kiesling. However, it was invalid because no holotype was specified. This was made up for a year later by Nigel Paul Taylor. Other nomenclatural synonyms are Cereus kroeneinii (R.Kiesling) P.J.Braun & Esteves(1995), Cereus phatnospermus subsp. kroenleinii (N.P.Taylor) P.J.Braun & Esteves (1997) and Monvillea phatnosperma subsp. kroenleinii (N.P.Taylor) Lodé (2013).

== Gallery ==
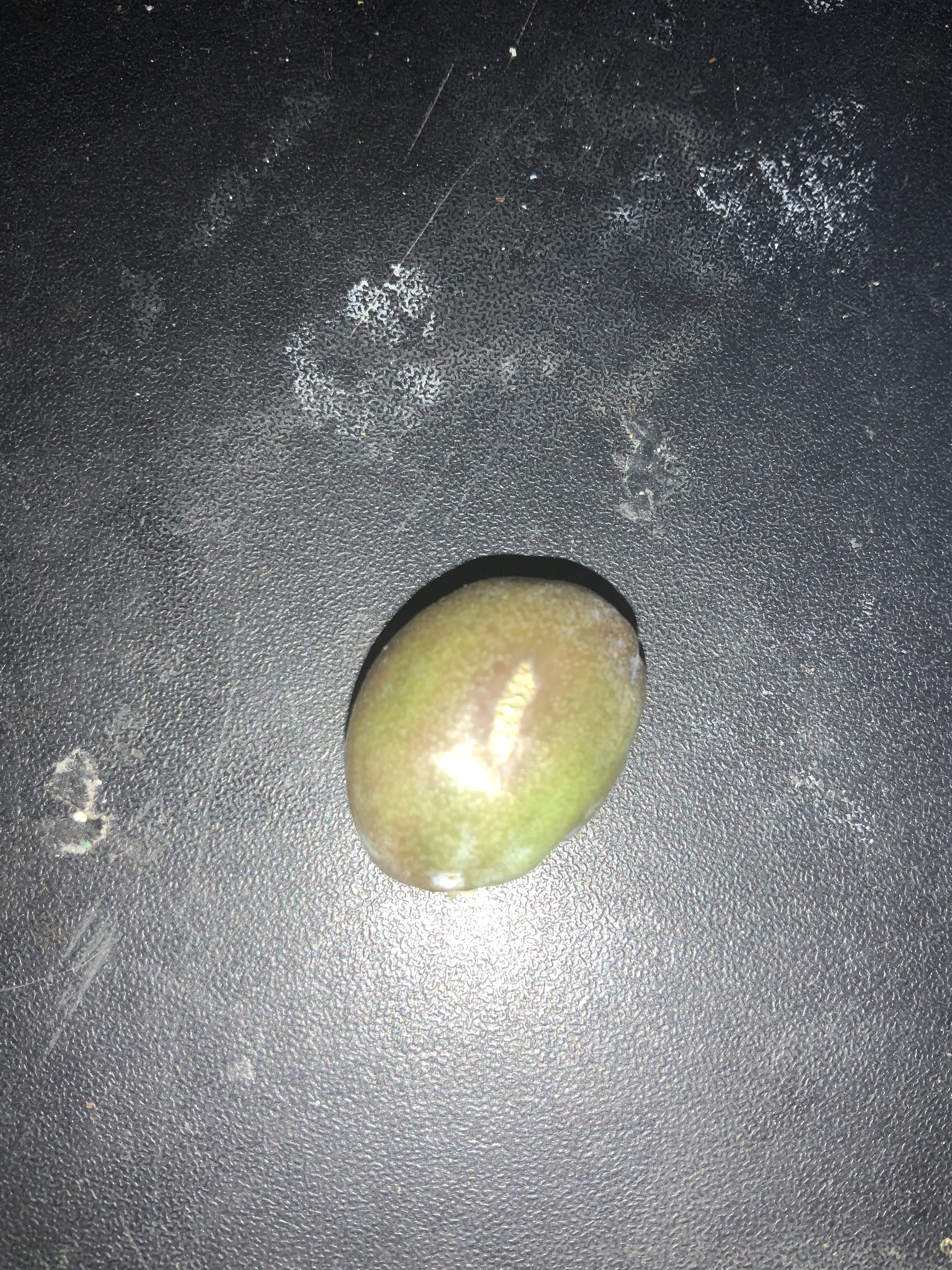
Cereus phatnospermus fruit

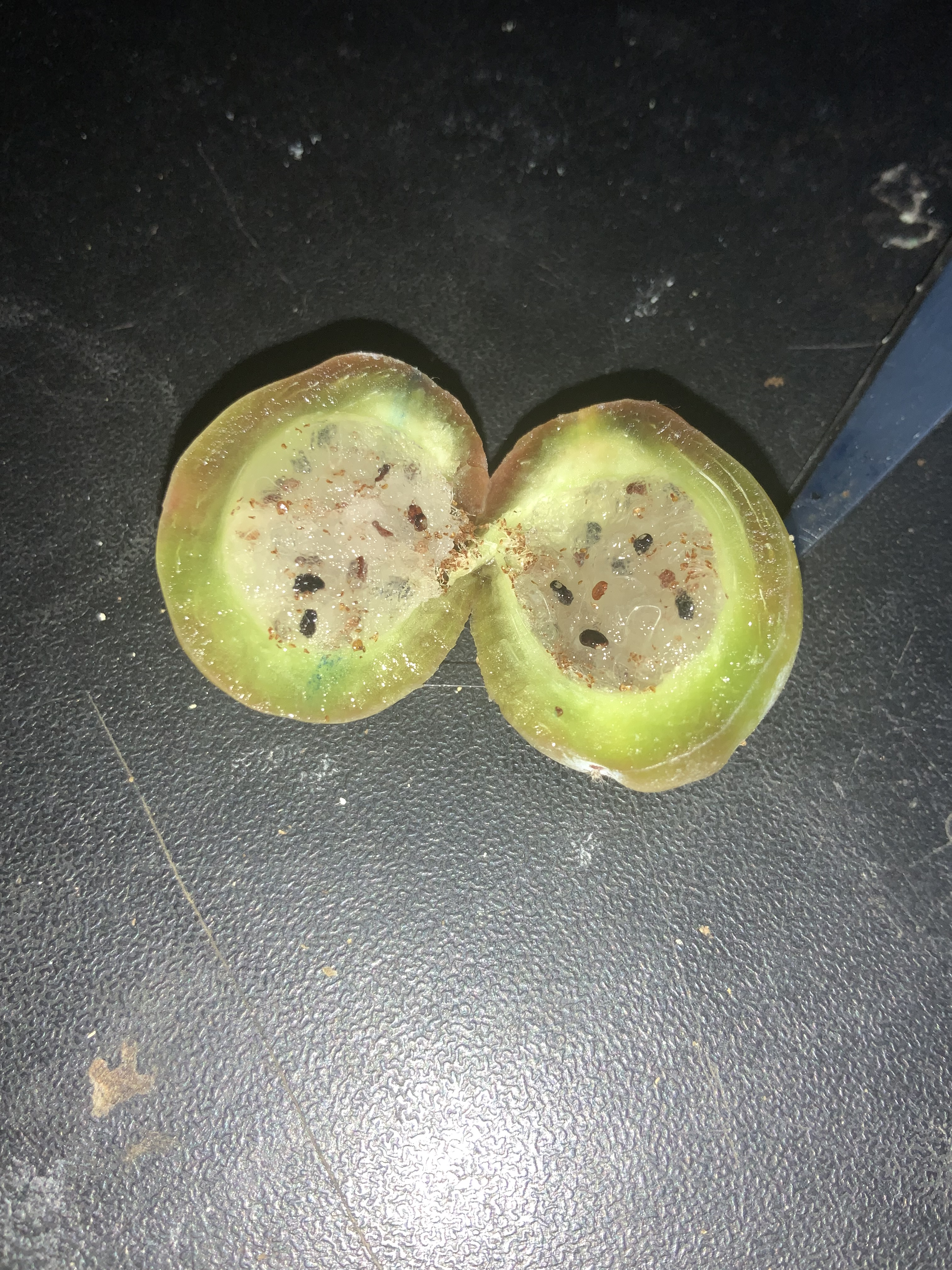
Cereus phatnospermus fruit cut open

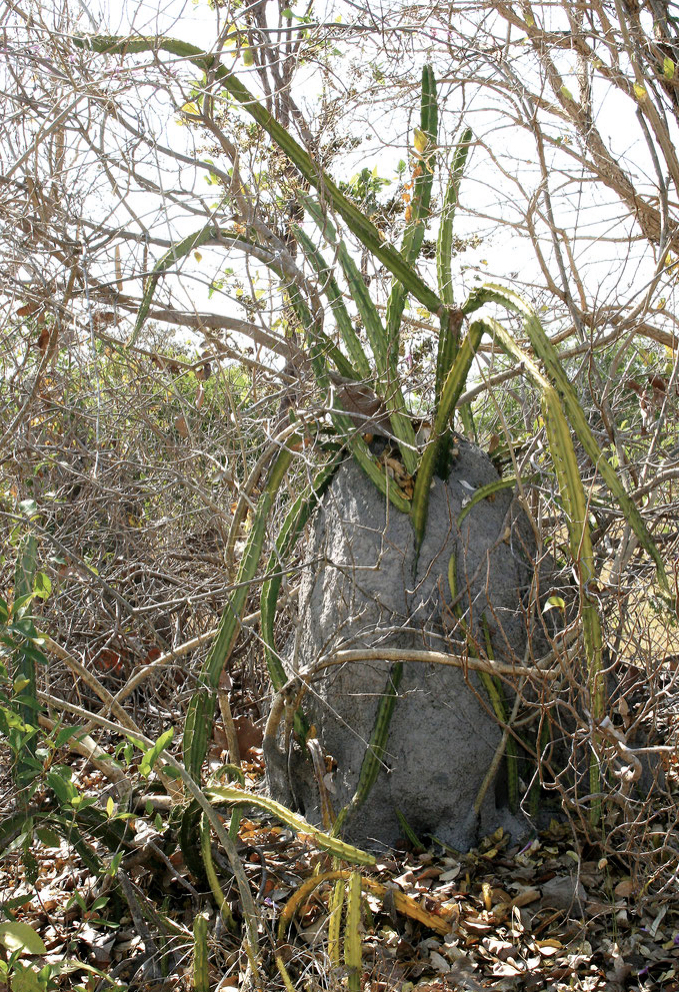
Cereus phatnospermus in habitat

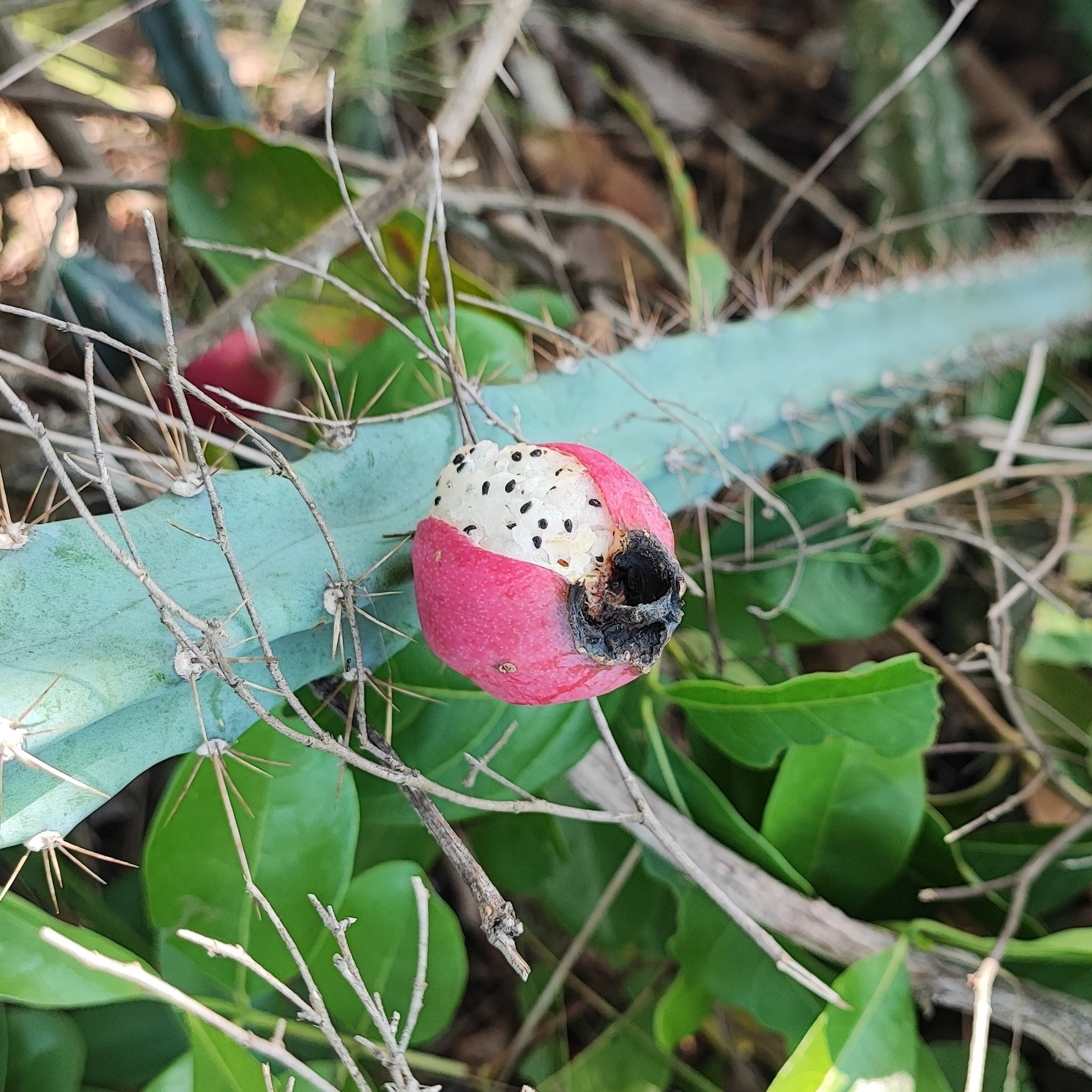
Ripened fruit of Cereus phatnospermus

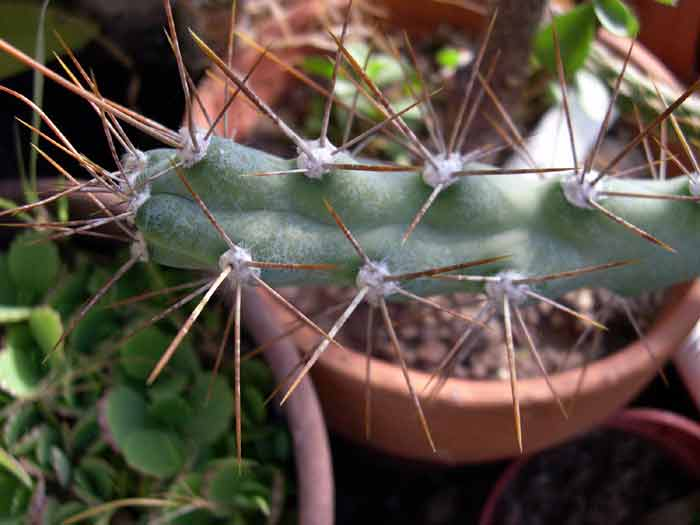
