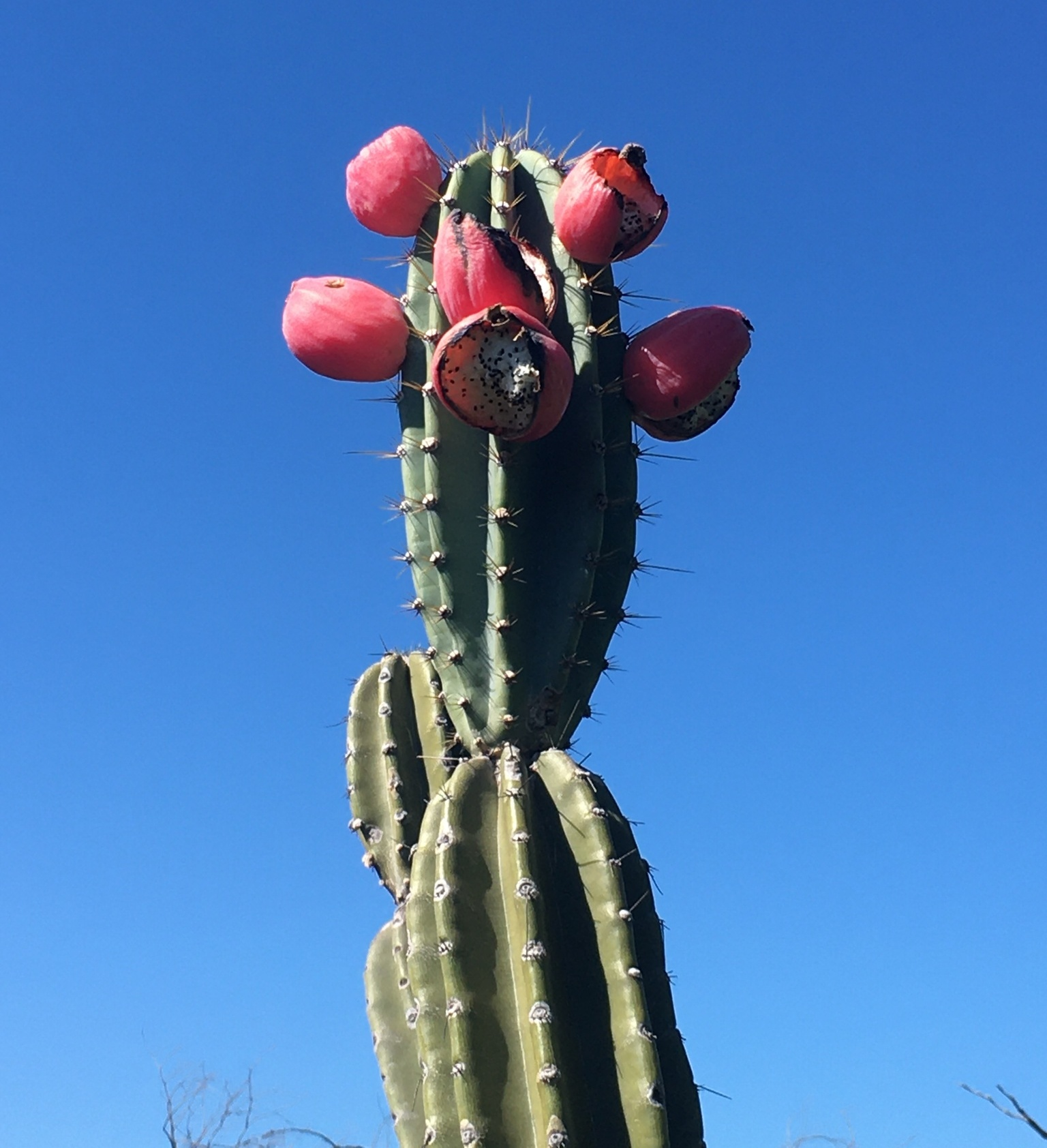

Conservation status
- Least Concern (IUCN 3.1)

Scientific classification
- Kingdom: Plantae
- Clade: Tracheophytes
- Clade: Angiosperms
- Clade: Eudicots
- Order: Caryophyllales
- Family: Cactaceae
- Subfamily: Cactoideae
- Genus: Cereus
- Species: C. bicolor

Binomial name
- Cereus bicolor Rizzini & A.Mattos

= Cereus bicolor =

Species of flowering plant

Cereus bicolor is a species of plant in the genus Cereus.

== Description ==
Cereus bicolor is a species of cactus native to west central Brazil; the plant grows in the seasonally dry tropical areas. This shrubby cactus can grow up to 3 metres (9.8 ft) tall with bluish-green stems. These stems grow up to 1 metre (3 ft 3 in) tall, and 15 cm (5.9 in) in diameter. Like all cacti, Cereus bicolor has areoles. The areoles bear 3-5 central spines and 6-8 radial spines. Sweet-scented white nocturnal flowers emerge from the areoles. The flowers grow up to 17 cm (6.7 in). Reddish fruits are spherical to egg-shaped, revealing their edible flesh.
