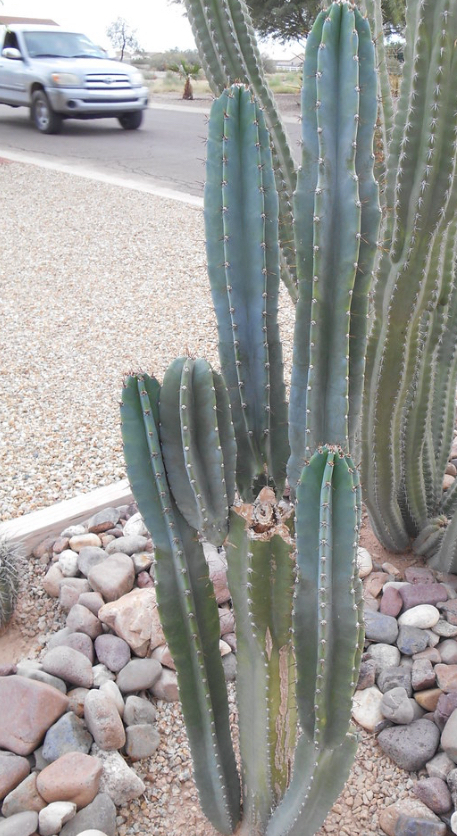

Scientific classification
- Kingdom: Plantae
- Clade: Tracheophytes
- Clade: Angiosperms
- Clade: Eudicots
- Order: Caryophyllales
- Family: Cactaceae
- Subfamily: Cactoideae
- Genus: Cereus
- Species: C. pachyrrhizus

Binomial name
- Cereus pachyrrhizus K.Schum.

Synonyms
- Piptanthocereus pachyrrhizus (K.Schum.) F.Ritter

= Cereus pachyrrhizus =

Species of cactus

Cereus pachyrrhizus (sometimes spelled pachyrhizus) is a species of plant in the genus Cereus.

== Description ==
Cereus pachyrrhizus is a tree-like cactus, growing up to 3–5 metres (9.8–16.4 ft) tall with large, thickened, tuberous roots. The stems are cylindrical, yellowish-green to yellowish-brown in color, around 10 cm (4 in) wide and usually have 6 ribs. The stem also have 1.3 cm (1/2 in) areoles, each bearing 10-13 spines. The flowers are white and showy.The fruits are ellipsoid in shape and measure up to 5 cm in length.

== Distribution ==
Cereus pachyrrhizus is native to the seasonally dry deserts of Paraguay.

== Taxonomy ==
The first description was published in 1903 by Karl Moritz Schumann who named it after its thick swollen roots.
