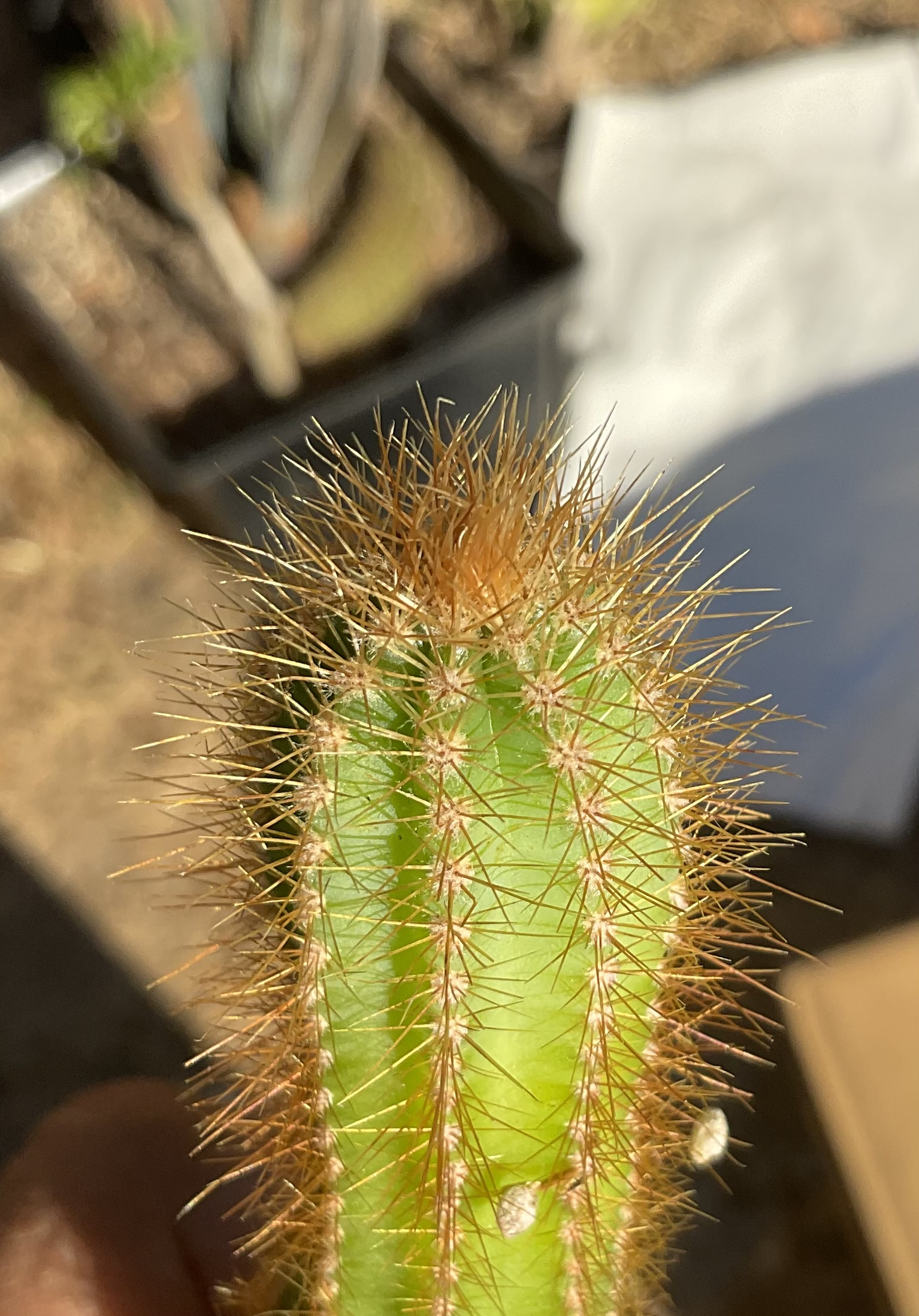

Scientific classification
- Kingdom: Plantae
- Clade: Embryophytes
- Clade: Tracheophytes
- Clade: Angiosperms
- Clade: Eudicots
- Order: Caryophyllales
- Family: Cactaceae
- Subfamily: Cactoideae
- Genus: Cereus
- Species: C. gerardi

Binomial name
- Cereus gerardi N.P.Taylor

Synonyms
- Cereus hexagonus subsp. gerardi (N.P.Taylor) Guiggi

= Cereus gerardi =

Species of flowering plant

Cereus gerardi is a species of Cereus native to the state Tocantins in Brazil.

== Description ==
Cereus gerardi has erect stems up to 3 meters talks; The stems are greenish-blue and have many ribs. 2-3 Central spines are seen and 5-9 are counted for radial spines. Central spines are yellow in color. These cactus clusters at the base, forming a bushy mass of long stems. The tubular flowers are cream colored. Fruits are circular to egg shaped, splitting open when ripe.

== Distribution ==
Cereus gerardi is found near the town of Pugmil in the Brazilian state of Tocantins
