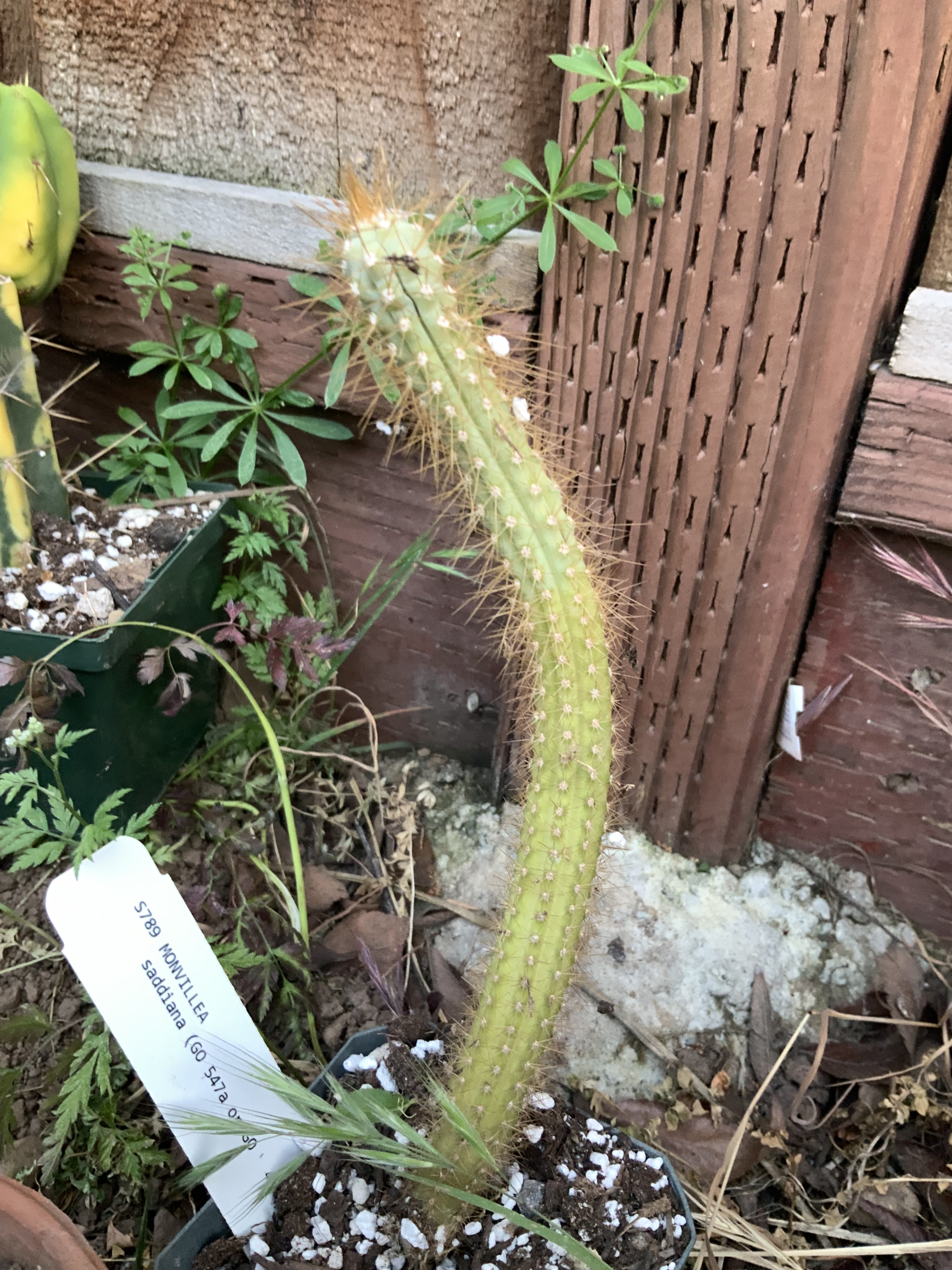

Conservation status
- Critically Endangered (IUCN 3.1)

Scientific classification
- Kingdom: Plantae
- Clade: Tracheophytes
- Clade: Angiosperms
- Clade: Eudicots
- Order: Caryophyllales
- Family: Cactaceae
- Subfamily: Cactoideae
- Genus: Cereus
- Species: C. saddianus

Binomial name
- Cereus saddianus (Rizzini & A.Mattos) P.J.Braun

Synonyms
- Monvillea saddiana Rizzini & A.Mattos

= Cereus saddianus =

Species of cactus

Cereus saddianus is a species of cactus native to the seasonally dry areas of Brazil.

== Description ==
Cereus saddianus is a tall, tree-like, semi-decumbent cactus reaching up to 20 ft. Stems are grey, and reach up to 2.5 inches in diameter. Each stems has 8 or 9 wavy ribbed. Areoles have whitish wool and long spines. There is one central spine (around 1 inch) and 6-7 radial spines (around 0.5 inch) per areole. Flowers are white, growing up to 3.2 inches long. Fruits are pinkish, and 2 inches by 1.2 inches.

== Distribution ==
Cereus saddianus is endemic to seasonally dry tropical Mato Grosso

== Taxonomy ==
Cereus saddianus was first described by Rizzini & A.Mattos in the journal Revista Brasil in 1985. The plant was described as Monvillea saddiana. In 1988, the genus Monvillea was moved to cereus. Currently, the name Cereus saddianus is accepted.

== Etymology ==
The genus name Cereus means candle in latin. The epithet saddianus refers to Nagib Saddi (fl. 1984), a Brazilian botanist researching plant taxonomy, at the Federal University of Mato Grosso.
