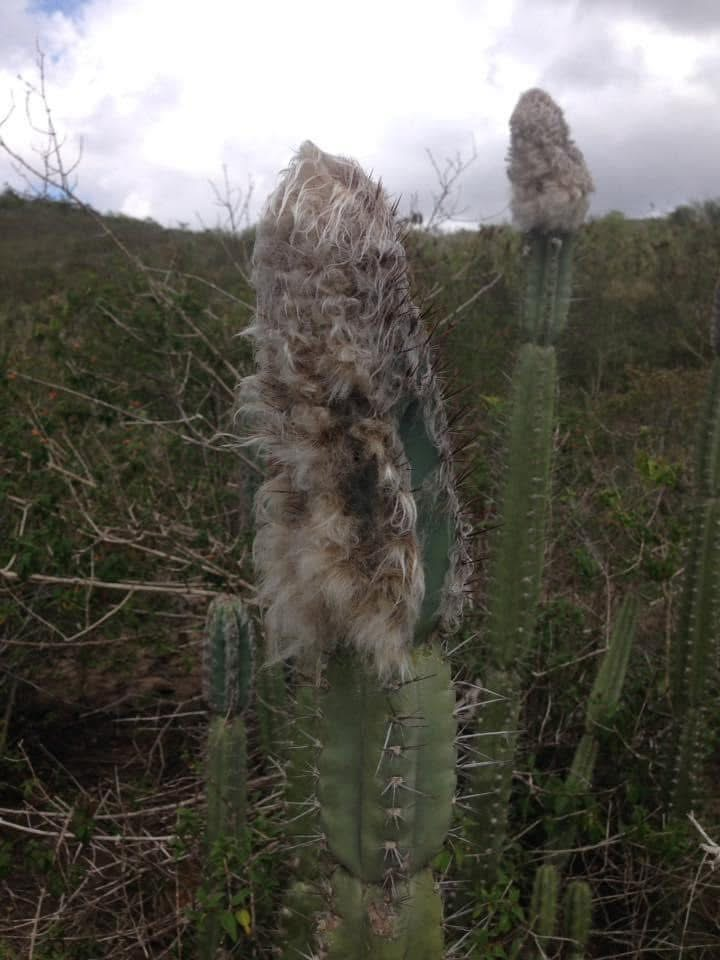

Conservation status
- Near Threatened (IUCN 3.1)

Scientific classification
- Kingdom: Plantae
- Clade: Tracheophytes
- Clade: Angiosperms
- Clade: Eudicots
- Order: Caryophyllales
- Family: Cactaceae
- Subfamily: Cactoideae
- Genus: Cereus
- Species: C. mortensenii

Binomial name
- Cereus mortensenii (Croizat) D.R.Hunt & N.P.Taylor

Synonyms
- Pseudopilosocereus mortensenii; Pilosocereus mortensenii; Pilosocereus gruberi

= Cereus mortensenii =

Species of cactus

Cereus mortensenii is a species of plant found in seasonally dry areas of Venezuela. It is the only Cereus species that develops a cephalium.

== Description ==
Cereus mortensenii is a species of treelike cactus that is very branched and reaches heights of up to 8 metres (26 ft). The stems are hexagonal and although initially bluish, as they age, they become blue-greenish. They have a diameter of up to 8 centimetres (3.1 in) and have up to nine ribs.

The wooly areoles have 1 to 2 strong central spines of yellowish to gray color and reach a length of 3 to 4 cm. There are also 5 to 7 thin and pointed marginal spines of brown to gray and measure 1 to 1.5 cm long. Mature plants form a thick pseudocephalium

The flowers are creamy white and nocturnal. They measure up to 6 cm long and up to 3.5 cm in diameter. The fruits are spherical and depressed, and are characterized by having adhered flowering remains.

== Taxonomy ==
This plant is sometimes placed in the genus Pilosocereus because of its cephalium.

== Etymology ==
This plant is named for Russell H. Mortensen who helped with the discovery and collection of this species
