= Cereus lepidotus =

Conservation status
- Data Deficient (IUCN 3.1)

Scientific classification
- Kingdom: Plantae
- Clade: Tracheophytes
- Clade: Angiosperms
- Clade: Eudicots
- Order: Caryophyllales
- Family: Cactaceae
- Subfamily: Cactoideae
- Genus: Cereus
- Species: C. lepidotus

Binomial name
- Cereus lepidotus Salm-Dyck

Synonyms
- Piptanthocereus lepidotus (Salm-Dyck) Backeb.

Species of cactus

Cereus lepidotus in Ecuador

Cereus lepidotus (syn. Piptanthocereus lepidotus) is a species of flowering plant in the genus Cereus. This species is native to the seasonally dry area of Trinidad and Tobago and Colombia.

== Description ==
Cereus lepidotus is an arborescent, poorly known species of cacti. It is possibly synonymous with Cereus repandus.

Salm-Dyck says, "caule elato robustissimo glaucescenti-læteviride serius indumento lepidoto obducto", "stem high, very robust, somewhat glaucous to bright green, later covered with a scaly indumentum"

== Taxonomy ==
Cereus lepidotus was first described by Salm-Dyck in 1850. The epithet lepidotus refers to the scaly indumentum on the older stems of this plant.
