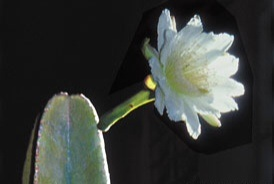
- Cereus pierre-braunianus

Scientific classification
- Kingdom: Plantae
- Clade: Tracheophytes
- Clade: Angiosperms
- Clade: Eudicots
- Order: Caryophyllales
- Family: Cactaceae
- Subfamily: Cactoideae
- Tribe: Cereeae
- Subtribe: Cereinae
- Genus: Cereus; Mill.

Type species
- Cereus hexagonus

Synonyms
- Cirinosum Neck. nom. illeg., opus utique oppr.; Estevesia P.J.Braun; Piptanthocereus (A.Berger) Riccob.; Praepilosocereus Guiggi; Subpilocereus Backeb.; Mirabella F. Ritter

= Cereus (plant) =

Genus of cacti

Cereus (/ˈsɪəriəs/ "serious") is a genus of cacti (family Cactaceae) including around 33 species of large columnar cacti from South America. The name is derived from Greek (κηρός) and Latin words meaning "wax", "torch" or "candle". Cereus was one of the first cactus genera to be described; the circumscription varies depending on the authority. The term "cereus" is also sometimes used for a ceroid cactus, any cactus with a very elongated body, including columnar growth cacti and epiphytic cacti.

== Description ==
Cereus are shrubby or treelike, often attaining great heights (C. hexagonus, C. lamprospermus, C. trigonodendron, C. ingens up to 15 metres or 49 feet). Most stems are angled or distinctly ribbed, ribs 3–14 centimetres (1 1/4–5 1/2 inches) long, usually well developed and have large areoles, usually bearing spines. Cephalium is not present; C. mortensenii develops pseudocephalium. The flowers are large, funnelform, 9–30 cm (3 1/2–11 3/4 in) long, usually white, sometimes pink, purple, rarely cream, yellow, greenish, and open at night. The fruits are globose to ovoid to oblong, 3–13 cm (1 1/4–5 in) long, fleshy, naked, usually red but sometimes yellow, pulp white, pink or red. The seeds are large, curved ovoid, glossy black.

== Taxonomy ==
The name Cereus originates in a book by Tabernaemontanus published in 1625 and refers to the candle-like form of species C. hexagonus. It was described by Philip Miller in 1754, and included all known cacti with very elongated bodies.

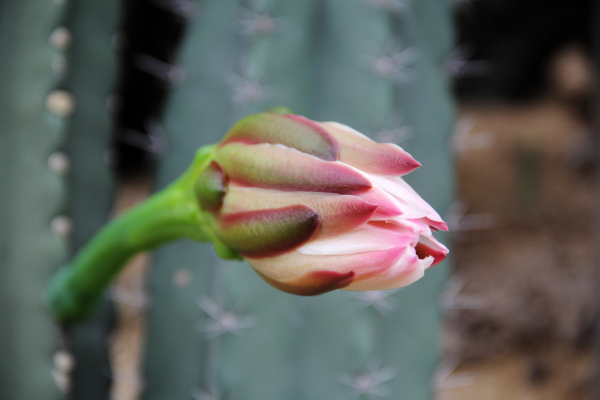
Flower of Cereus fernambucensis (syn. Cereus neotetragonus)

Ludwig Pfeiffer in 1838 distinguished Cephalocereus (type Cephalocereus senilis); the name is derived from the Greek κεφᾶλή (cephalē; 'head') thus headed cereus, referring to the hairy pseudocephalium. Charles Lemaire described Pilocereus in 1839, now renamed as Pilosocereus. The name Pilocereus is derived from the Greek πῖλος (pilos), felted, hairy, thus hairy cereus, similar to the Latin pilosus, from which the name Pilosocereus was derived. Echinocereus (type Echinocereus viridiflorus) was described in 1848 by George Engelmann; the name is derived from the Greek ἐχῖνος (echinos; 'hedgehog' or 'sea urchin').

Nathaniel Lord Britton and Joseph Nelson Rose (1919–1923) as well as Alwin Berger (1929) continued to divide Cereus into many genera. The 33 or so species that remain in the Cereus group are largely plants that have not been moved out of the genus rather than plants that have been included because they fit the description of Cereus. This inclusion-by-lack-of-exclusion makes for a very messy and unsatisfactory grouping.

Some sources include the genus Mirabella Cereus as a subgenus, C. subg. Mirabella.

=== Species ===
As of April 2025, Plants of the World Online accepted the following species:

| Subgenus | Image | Scientific name | Distribution |
|---|---|---|---|
| Mirabella | | Cereus albicaulis (Britton & Rose) Luetzelb. | North-east Brazil |
| Mirabella | | Cereus alex-bragae (P.J.Braun & Esteves) M.Köhler | Goiás, Brazil |
| Mirabella | | Cereus mirabella N.P.Taylor | Brazil |
| Oblongicarpi | | Cereus fricii Backeb. | Colombia, Venezuela |
| Oblongicarpi | | Cereus horrispinus Backeb. | Colombia, Venezuela |
| Oblongicarpi | | Cereus mortensenii (Croizat) D.R.Hunt & N.P.Taylor | Venezuela |
| Oblongicarpi | | Cereus repandus (L.) Mill. | Aruba, Colombia, Venezuela, Venezuela |
| Oblongicarpi | | Cereus serruliflorus Haw. | Haiti |
| Ebneria | | Cereus aethiops Haw. | Argentina to Uruguay |
| Ebneria | | Cereus phatnospermus K.Schum. | Argentina, Bolivia, Brazil, Paraguay |
| Ebneria | | Cereus saddianus (Rizzini & A.Mattos) P.J.Braun | Mato Grosso, Brazil |
| Ebneria | | Cereus spegazzinii F.A.C.Weber | Argentina, Bolivia, Brazil, Paraguay |
| Cereus | | Cereus bicolor Rizzini & A.Mattos | Brazil |
| Cereus | | Cereus fernambucensis Lem. | Brazil |
| Cereus | | Cereus forbesii C.F.Först. | Argentina, Bolivia, Paraguay |
| Cereus | | Cereus gerardi N.P.Taylor | Tocantins, Brazil |
| Cereus | | Cereus hexagonus (L.) Mill. | Brazil, French Guiana, Guyana, Suriname, Venezuela |
| Cereus | | Cereus hildmannianus K.Schum. | Argentina, Bolivia, Brazil, Paraguay, Uruguay |
| Cereus | | Cereus ingens N.P.Taylor & M.Machado | Bahia, Minas Gerais |
| Cereus | | Cereus insularis Hemsl. | Brazil (Pernambuco) |
| Cereus | | Cereus jamacaru DC. | Brazil |
| Cereus | | Cereus lamprospermus K.Schum. | Bolivia, Paraguay |
| Cereus | | Cereus lanosus (F.Ritter) P.J.Braun | Brazil, Paraguay |
| Cereus | | Cereus lepidotus Salm-Dyck | Colombia, Trinidad-Tobago, Venezuela |
| Cereus | | Cereus pachyrrhizus K.Schum. | Paraguay |
| Cereus | | Cereus pierre-braunianus Esteves | Brazil (NE Goiás) |
| Cereus | | Cereus stenogonus K.Schum. | Argentina, Bolivia, Brazil, Paraguay |
| Cereus | | Cereus trigonodendron K.Schum. ex Vaupel | Bolivia, Brazil, Peru |
| Cereus | | Cereus vargasianus Cárdenas | Peru |
| Cereus | | Cereus yungasensis A.Fuentes & Quispe | Bolivia |

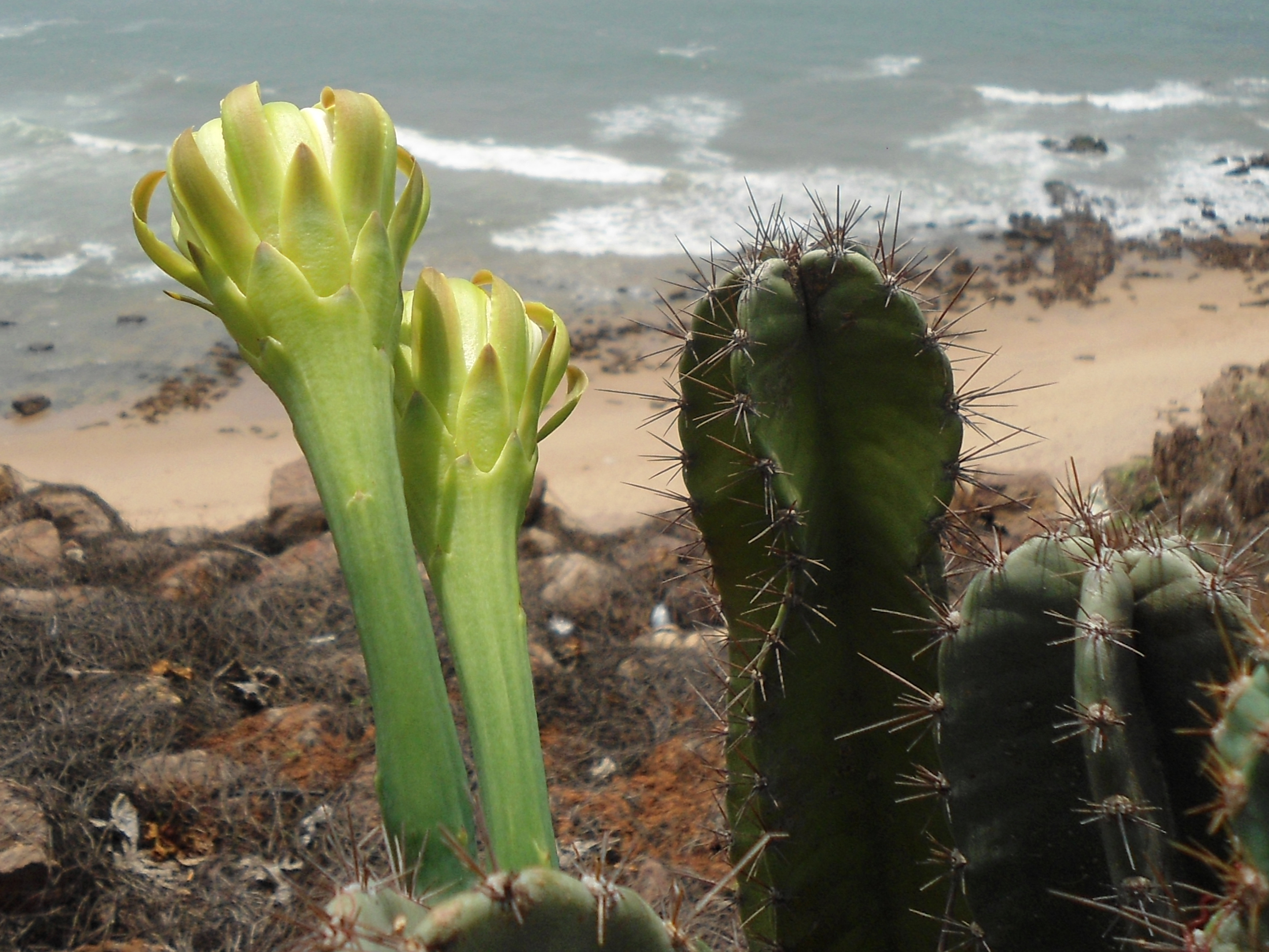
Cereus hexagonus at Tenneti Park in Visakhapatnam

=== Synonyms ===
Species that have formerly been accepted include:

- Cereus adelmarii, syn. of Cereus phatnospermus
- Cereus argentinensis, syn. of Cereus stenogonus
- Cereus braunii, syn. of Cereus trigonodendron
- Cereus cochabambensis, syn. of Cereus forbesii
- Cereus comarapanus, syn. of Cereus forbesii
- Cereus hankeanus, syn. of Cereus forbesii
- Cereus huilunchu, syn. of Cereus forbesii
- Cereus kroenleinii, syn. of Cereus phatnospermus
- Cereus roseiflorus, syn. of Cereus stenogonus
- Cereus tacuaralensis, syn. of Cereus stenogonus

== Distribution ==
The range includes Brazil, northern Argentina, Paraguay, Uruguay, and Bolivia; more rarely it can be found in Peru, Colombia, Guyana, Suriname, and Venezuela. Certain species are also invasive in South Africa

== Uses ==
The fruits and stems of C. repandus are edible, as is the fruit of many species in the genus; some perhaps have a laxative effect. The wood has been used in making furniture and for firewood, and sliced stems have been used as a soap substitute. The stems can be broken open for their pulp, a source of water. The plant is also cultivated as a living fence.

== Gallery ==
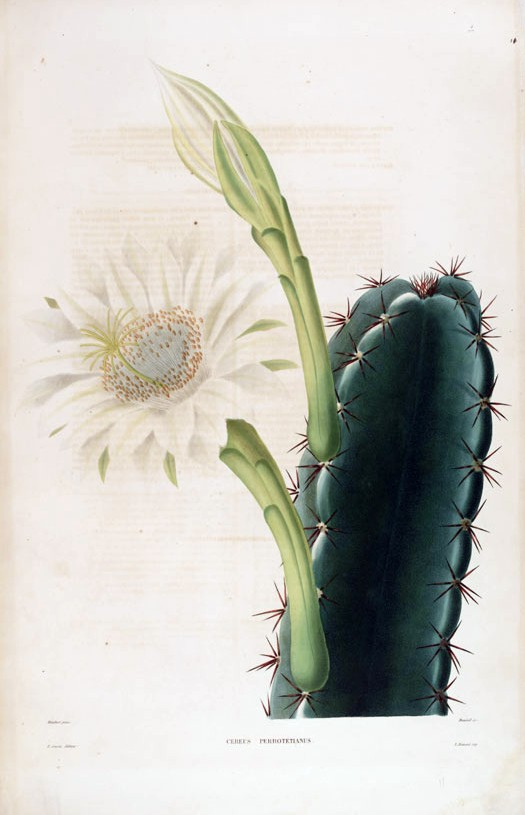
Charles Lemaire, Iconographie descriptive des cactées, 1841 – 7.

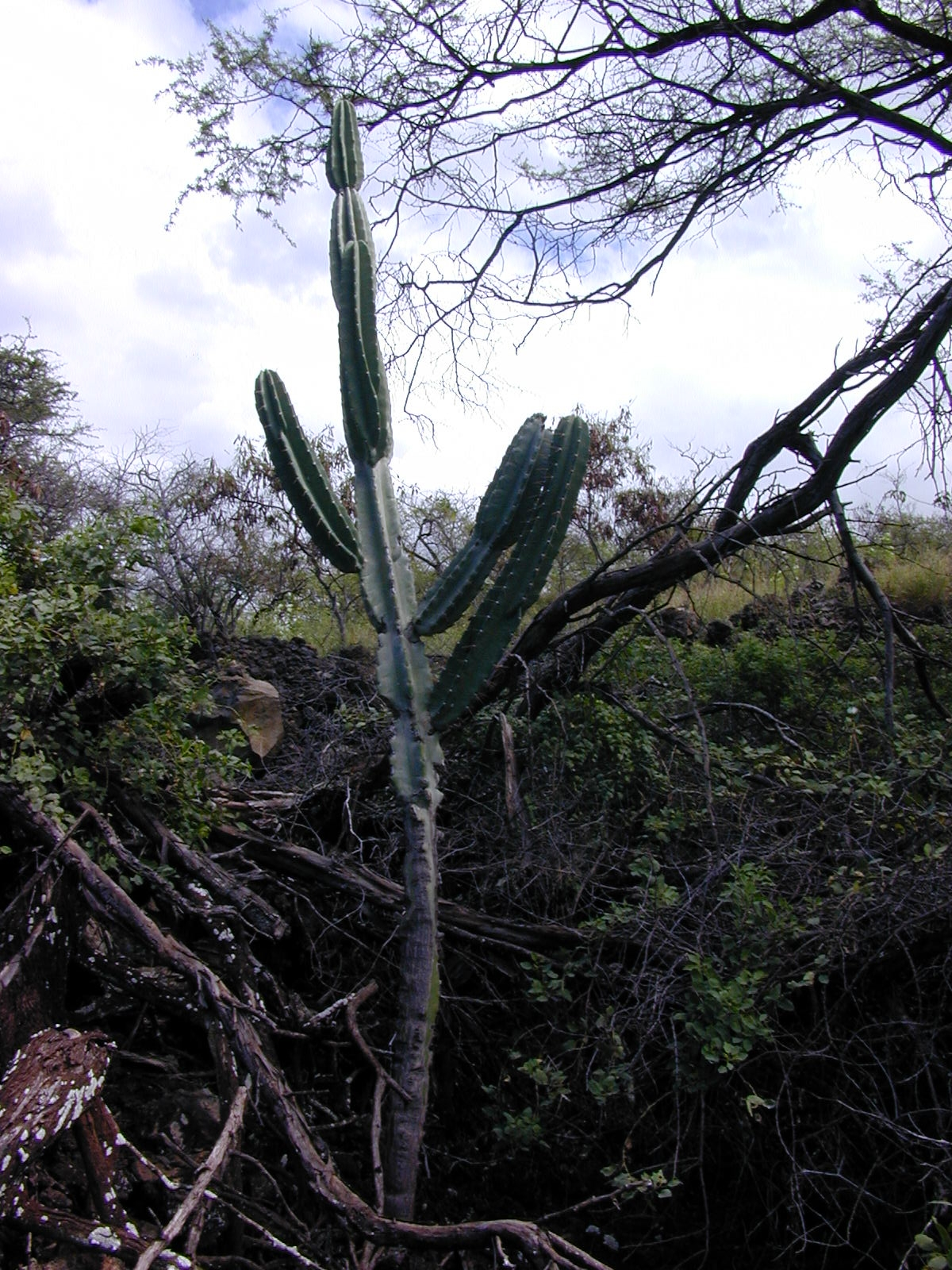
Cereus hildmannianus subsp. uruguayanus in shrub formation, Uruguay

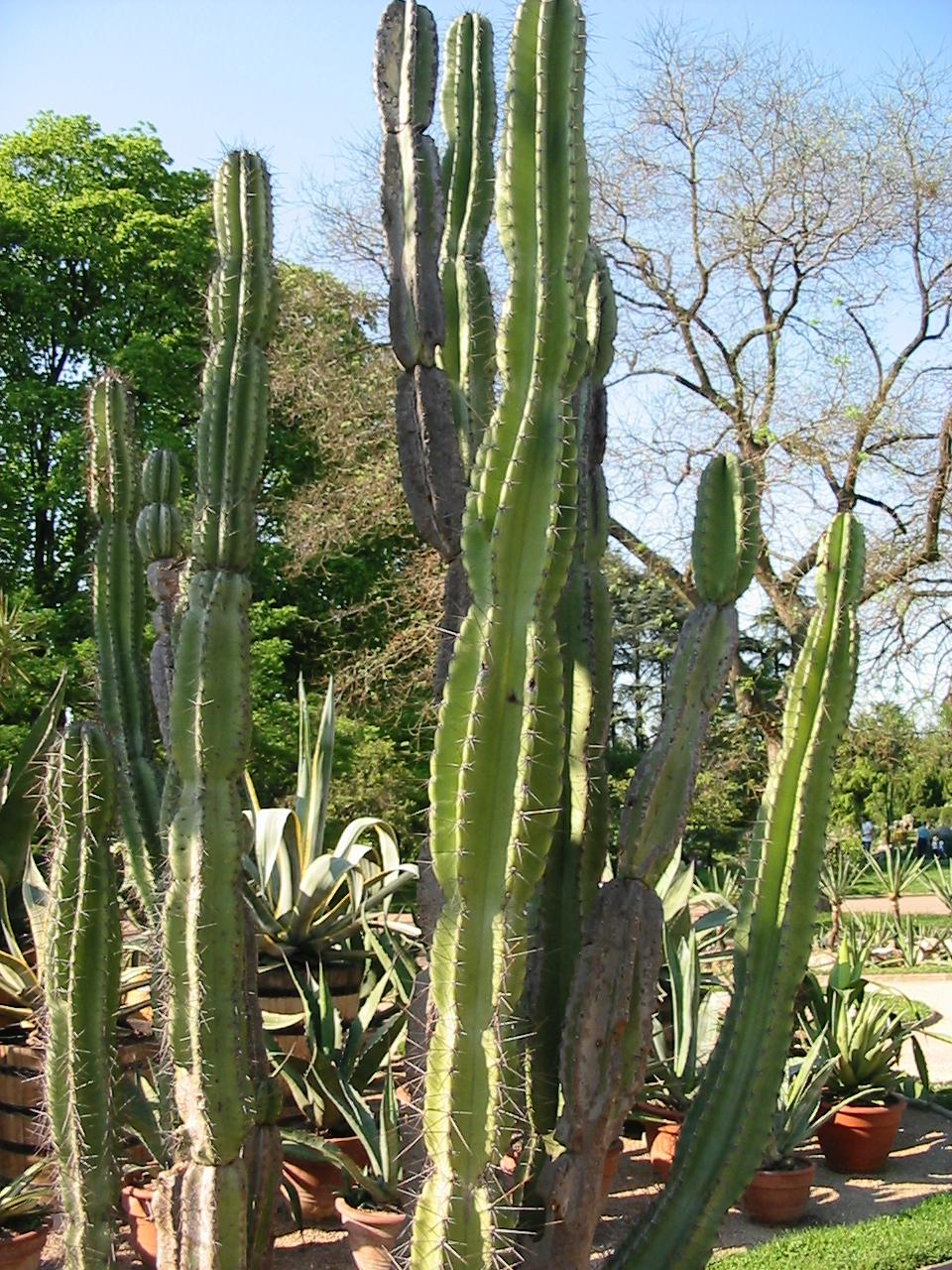
High plants of Cereus jamacaru

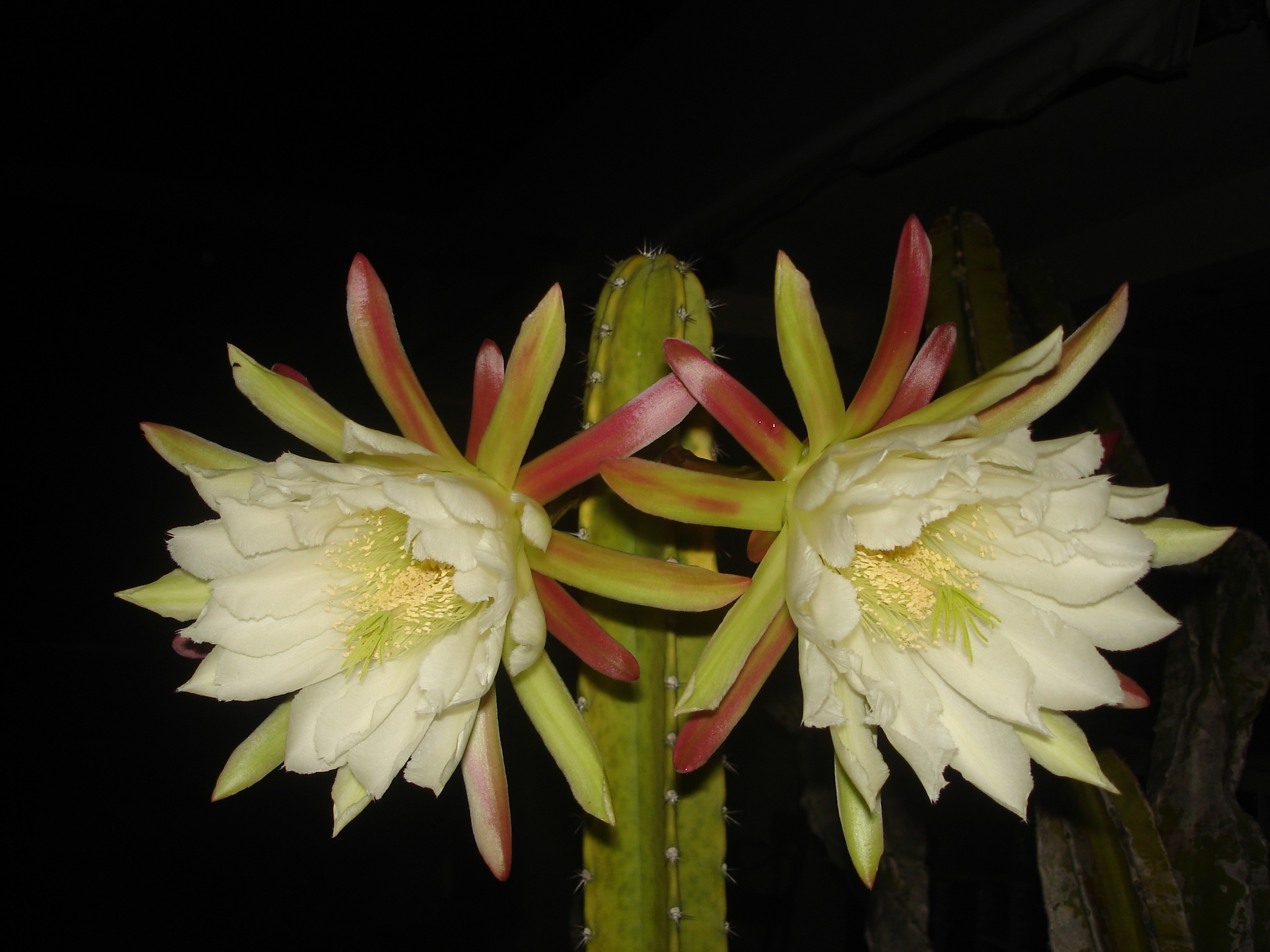
Nocturnal flowers of Cereus jamacaru

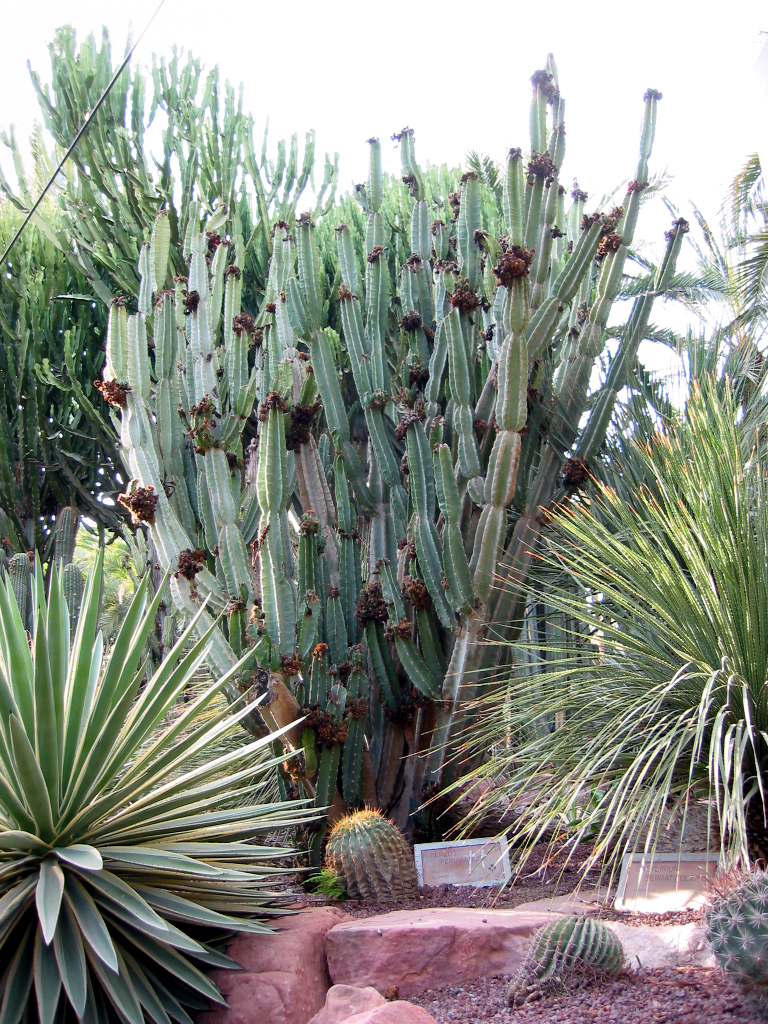
Stems are segmented annually

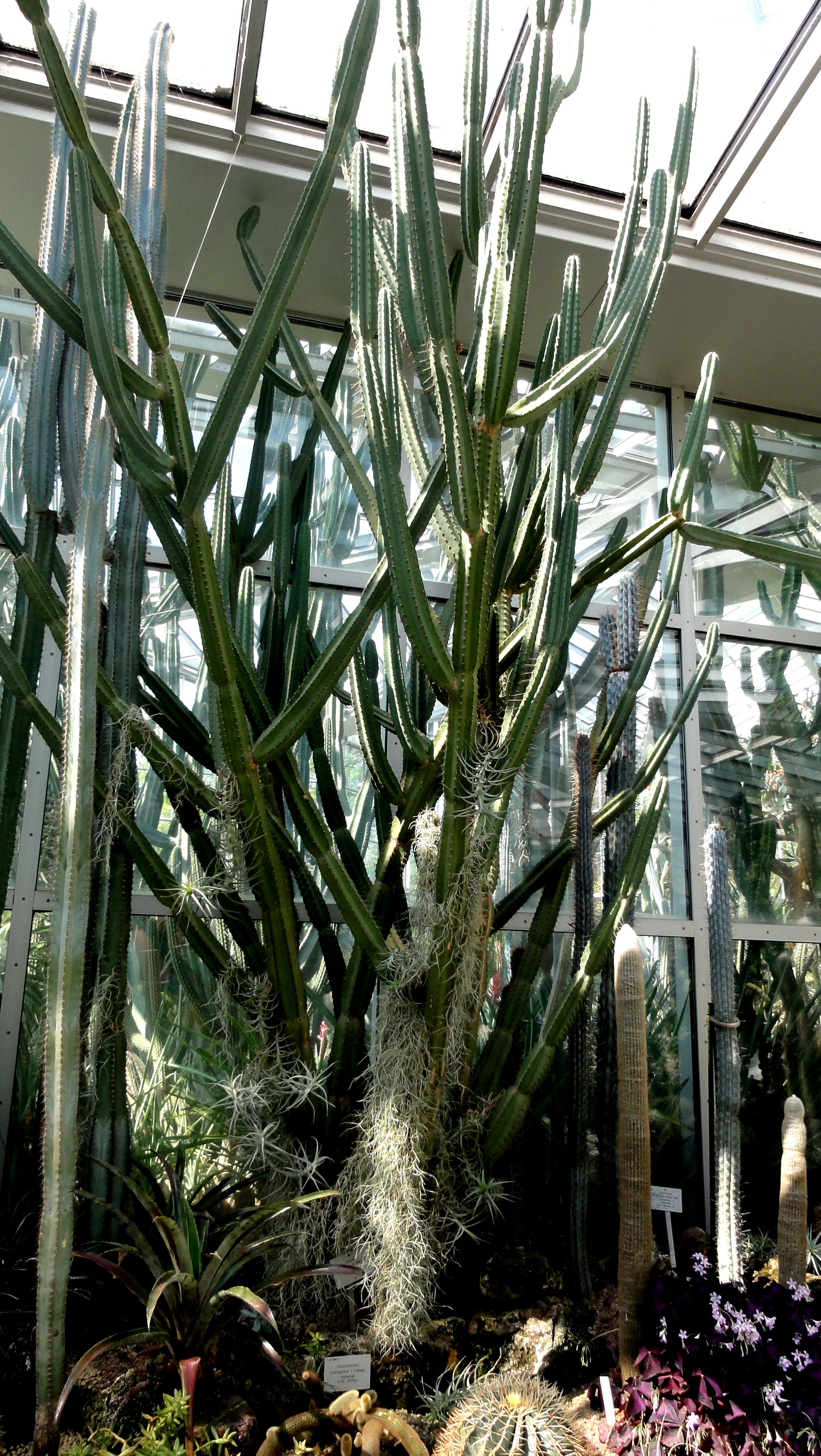
Cereus forbesii

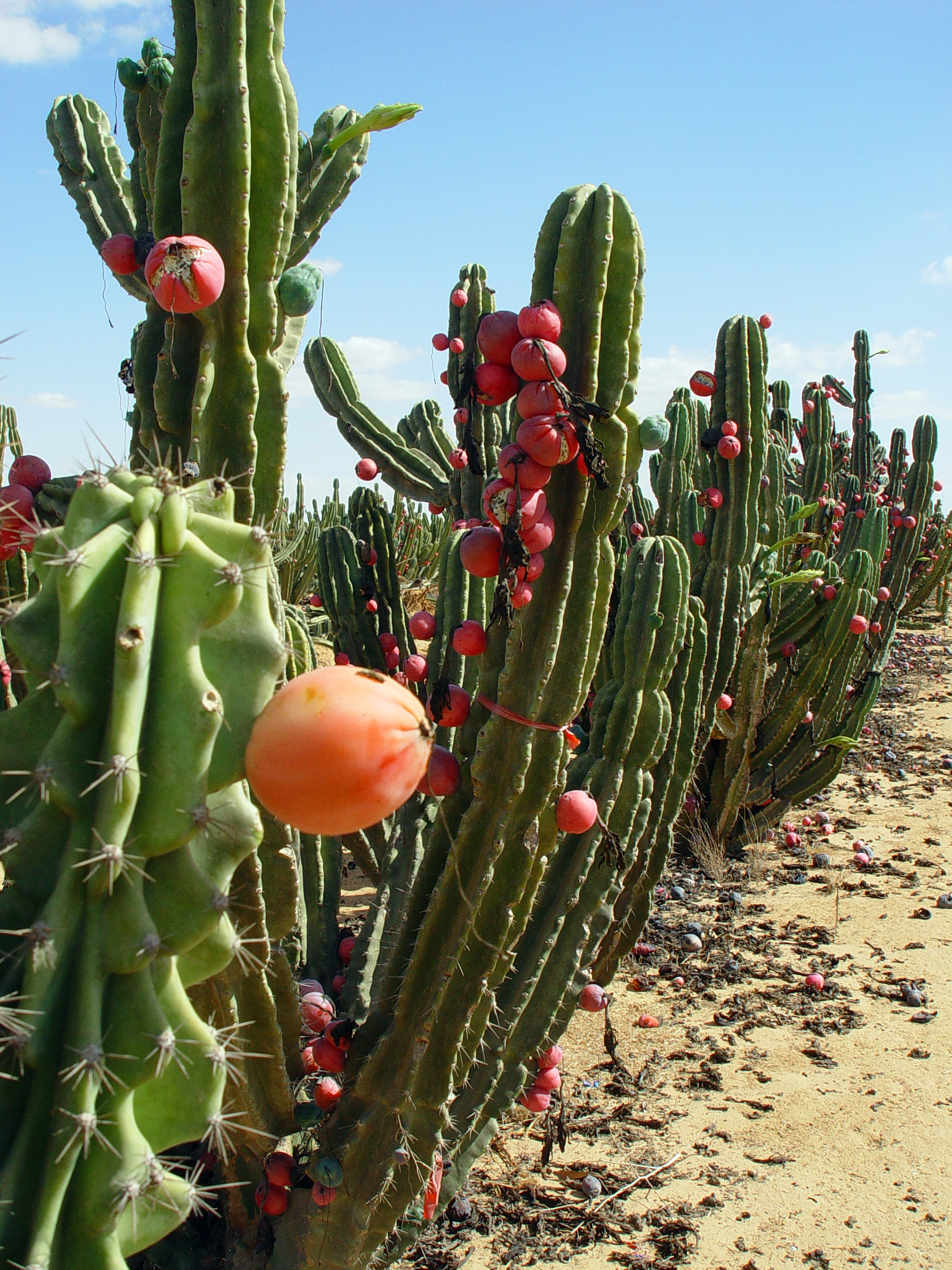
Fruits in cultivation

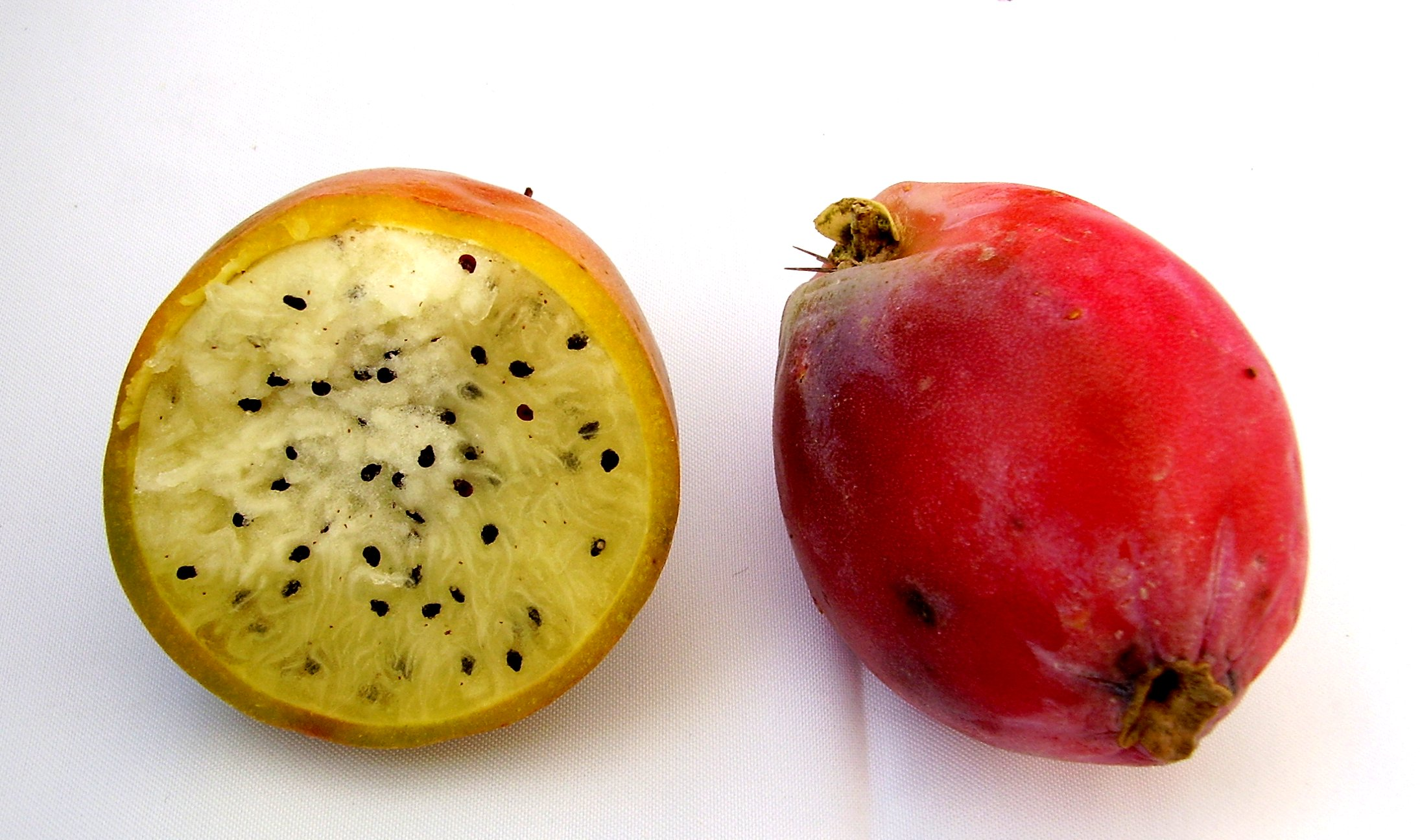
Edible fruits of Cereus repandus

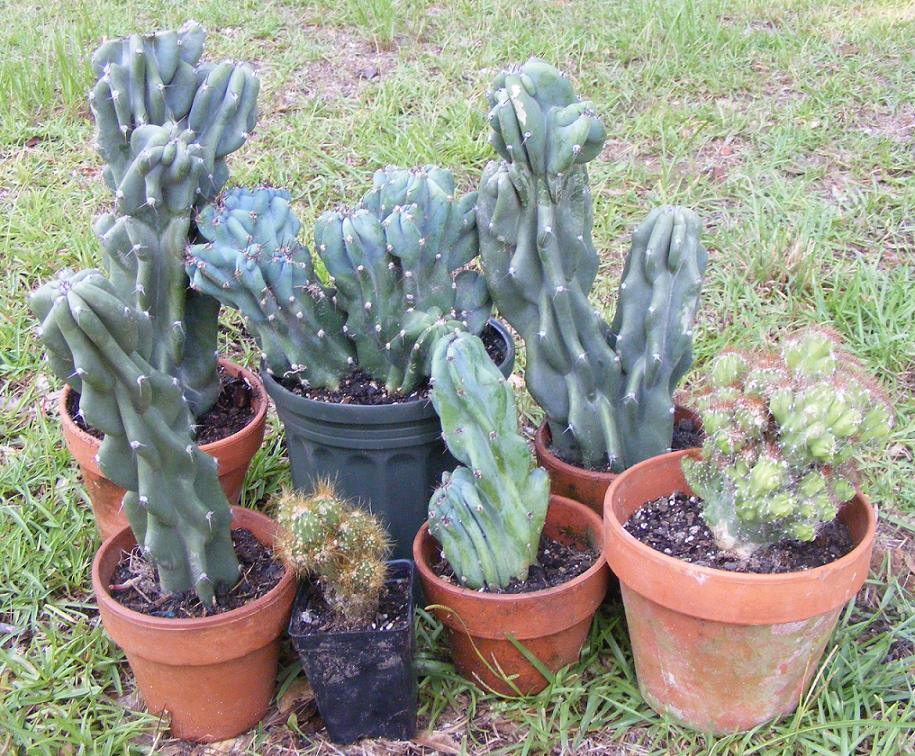
Different monstrose forms

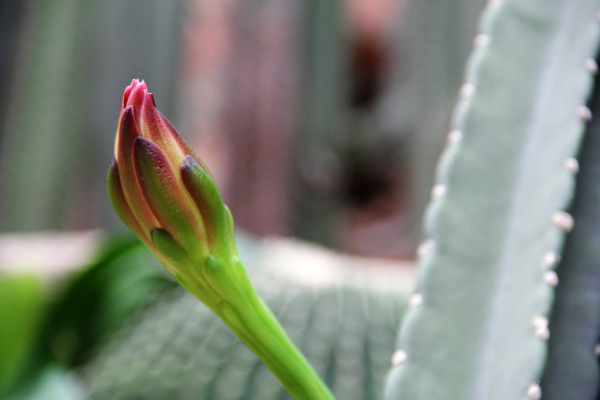
Flower bud of Cereus fernambucensis subsp. fernambucensis
