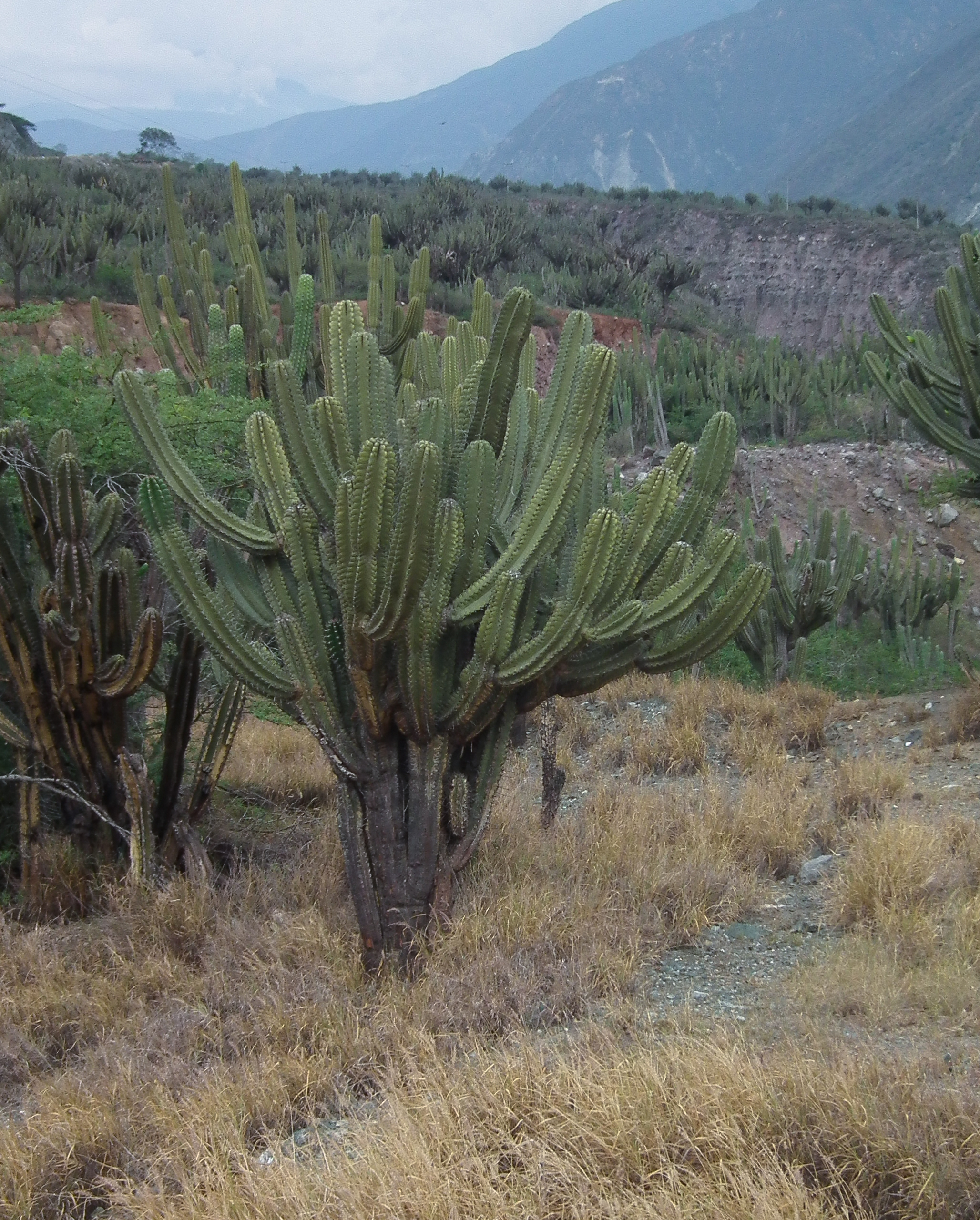

Conservation status
- Vulnerable (IUCN 3.1)

Scientific classification
- Kingdom: Plantae
- Clade: Tracheophytes
- Clade: Angiosperms
- Clade: Eudicots
- Order: Caryophyllales
- Family: Cactaceae
- Subfamily: Cactoideae
- Genus: Cereus
- Species: C. fricii

Binomial name
- Cereus fricii Backeb. 1930

= Cereus fricii =

Species of cactus

Cereus fricii is a species of Cereus from Venezuela.

== Description ==
Cereus fricii grows like a tree, is richly branched and reaches heights of growth of up to 8 meters. A trunk that is up to 2 meters high and has a diameter of 50 centimeters is formed. The almost upright, cylindrical shoots are dark green. There are four to six distinctly notched ribs folded horizontally. The large areoles on it are 1 to 2 centimeters apart and are covered with white wool. The three sub-central spines are dark brown and turn gray over time. One of them faces downwards, the rest stand more or less upright. The about seven radial spines are brown.

The cream-colored flowers are up to 9 centimeters long. The fruits, which are up to 6 centimeters long, are salmon-colored.

== Distribution ==
Cereus fricii is distributed in northern Venezuela.

== Taxonomy ==
The plant was first description was published in 1930 by Curt Backeberg. Nomenclatural synonyms are Cephalocereus fricii (Backeb.) Borg (1951) and Subpilocereus fricii (Backeb.) Guiggi (2010).

In the IUCN Red List of Threatened Species, the species is classified as "Vulnerable (VU)".
