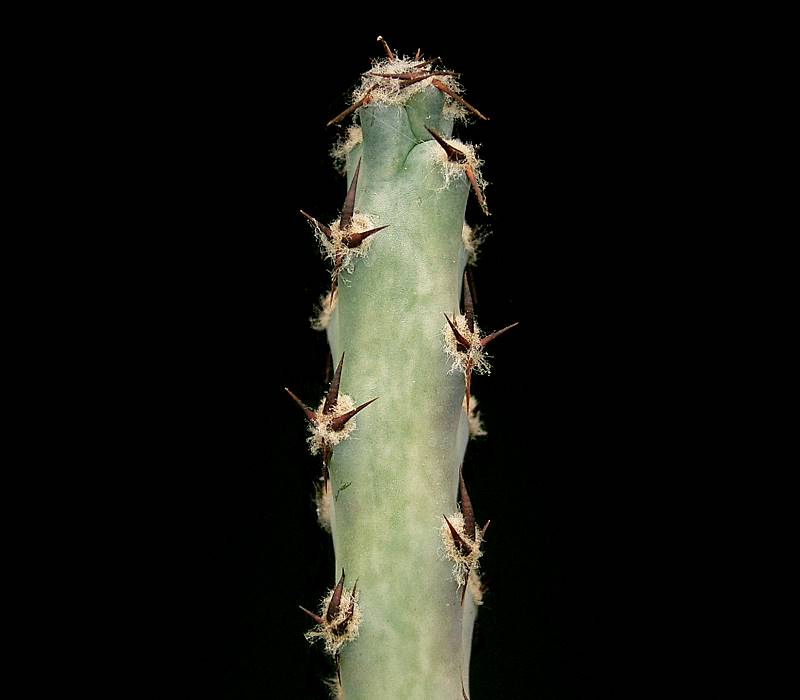

Conservation status
- Least Concern (IUCN 2.3)

Scientific classification
- Kingdom: Plantae
- Clade: Tracheophytes
- Clade: Angiosperms
- Clade: Eudicots
- Order: Caryophyllales
- Family: Cactaceae
- Subfamily: Cactoideae
- Genus: Cereus
- Species: C. spegazzinii

Binomial name
- Cereus spegazzinii F.A.C. Weber 1899

Synonyms
- Piptanthocereus spegazzinii; Monvillea spegazzinii; Cereus anisitsii; Monvillea anisitsii; Cereus lindenzweigianus; Monvillea lindenzweigiana; Piptanthocereus lindenzweigianus; Cereus ridleii; Monvillea ebenacantha

= Cereus spegazzinii =

Species of cactus

Cereus spegazzinii is a species of cactus found in Argentina, Bolivia, Brazil and Paraguay.

== Description ==
Cereus spegazzinii is a cactus that grows and branches abundantly. It is erect, sloping or almost creeping, with many cylindrical stems, of blue-green color often of glossy marble color. They grow up to 2 m in length and have a diameter of up to 6.5 cm. It has three to five ribs with very wide areoles. The first with two to three spines, and later with six blackish spines, and up to 1.5 cm in length. The flowers are white are 10 to 13 cm long and have a diameter of 7 to 9 cm. The fruits are pink ellipsoids.

== Distribution ==
Cereus spegazzinii is distributed in Brazil in Mato Grosso do Sul, in Paraguay, in Bolivia and in northern Argentina at altitudes of up to 1400 meters.

The plant was first described and published in 1899 by Frédéric Albert Constantin Weber. Nomenclature synonyms are Piptanthocereus spegazzinii (F.A.C.Weber) Riccob. (1909) and Monvillea spegazzinii (F.A.C.Weber) Britton & Rose (1920).

The species is classified as Least Concern (LC) in the IUCN Red List of Threatened Species.
