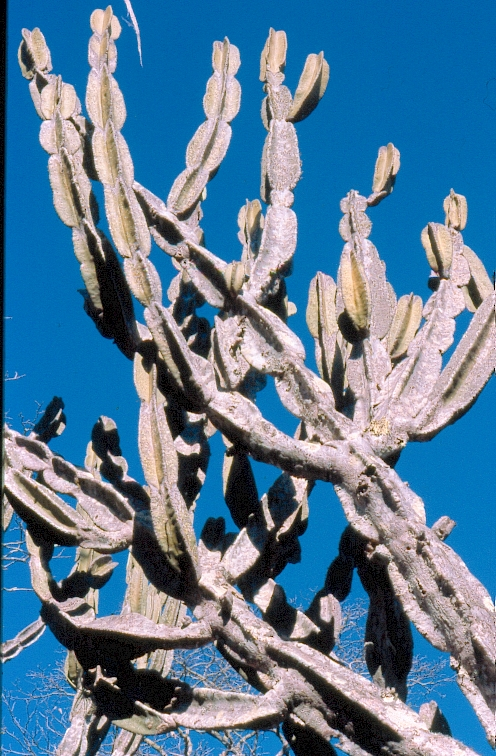

Conservation status
- Vulnerable (IUCN 2.3)

Scientific classification
- Kingdom: Plantae
- Clade: Tracheophytes
- Clade: Angiosperms
- Clade: Eudicots
- Order: Caryophyllales
- Family: Cactaceae
- Subfamily: Cactoideae
- Genus: Cereus
- Species: C. pierre-braunianus

Binomial name
- Cereus pierre-braunianus Esteves 2003

= Cereus pierre-braunianus =

Species of columnar cactus

Cereus pierre-braunianus is a species of columnar cactus found in northeastern Goiás in Brazil.

== Description ==
Cereus pierre-braunianus grows like a tree, has candelabra-like branches and reaches heights of growth of up to 7 metres (23 ft). A heavily woody trunk of up to 38 centimetres (15 in) in diameter is formed. The straight or arching, segmented, green to greyish-green shoots later become light grey and blotchy. The segments are 40 to 75 cm (16 to 30 in) long and have a diameter of up to 24 cm (9.4 in). There are four to six angular ribs that are up to 7.2 cm (2.8 in) high. The areoles on it are somewhat felty. The spines of the vegetative shoots are grey to dark grey with a black tip. The seven to nine central spines here reach a length of up to 2.3 cm (0.91 in), the seven to ten radial spines of only up to 1.3 cm (0.51 in). The thorns are missing in the flowering part of the shoot or there are one to three, which are up to 6 mm long.

The barely opening white flowers are 14 to 15.5 cm (5.5 to 6.1 in) long and have a diameter of up to 7 cm (2.8 in). Their pericarpel and flower tube are green. The spherical, thick-walled fruits are green, sometimes brownish. They are bald and have a diameter of up to 9.3 cm (3.7 in). The fibrous, sticky flesh is greenish white.

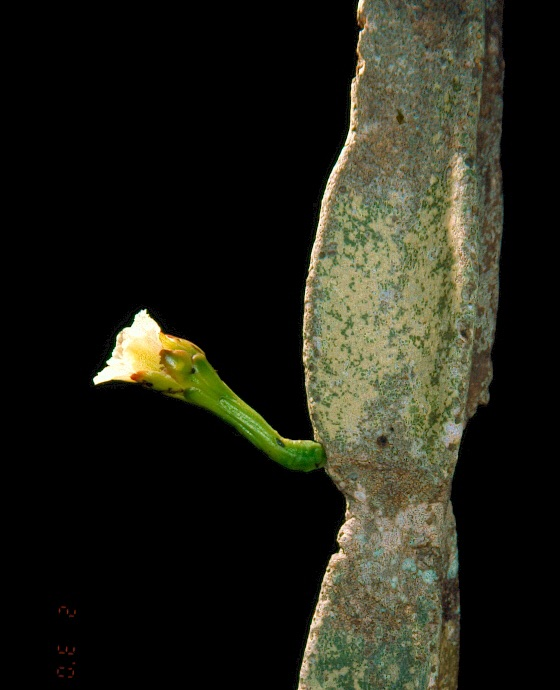
Cereus pierre-braunianus thornless shoot tip with flower

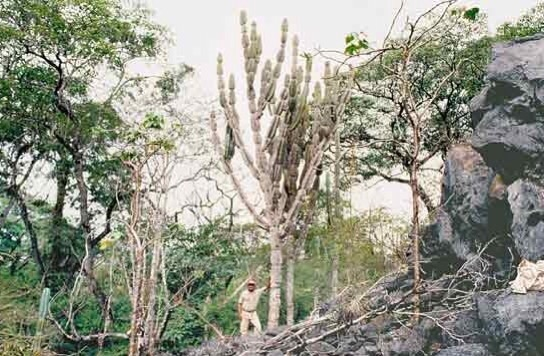
Cereus pierre-braunianus at the type location

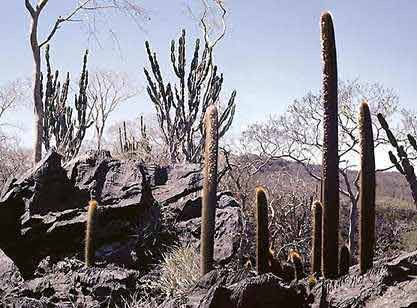
Cereus pierre-braunianus at the type location together with Micranthocereus estevesii in the foreground

== Distribution ==
Cereus pierre-braunianus is distributed on limestone rocks in the Brazilian state of Goiás.

== Taxonomy ==
The first description was published in 2003 by Eddie Esteves Pereira.

In the IUCN Red List of Threatened Species, the species is classified as "Vulnerable".
