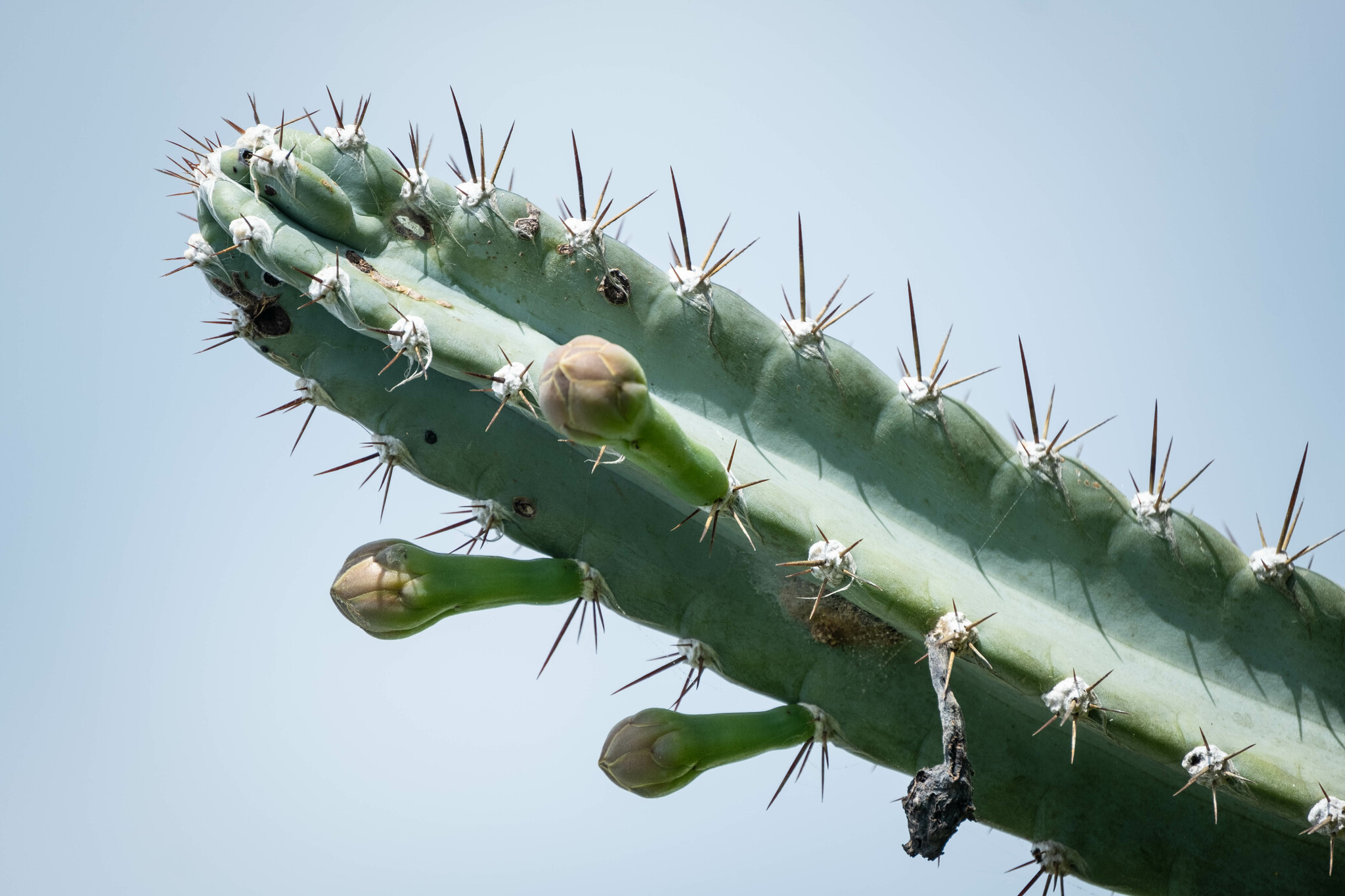

Conservation status
- Near Threatened (IUCN 3.1)

Scientific classification
- Kingdom: Plantae
- Clade: Tracheophytes
- Clade: Angiosperms
- Clade: Eudicots
- Order: Caryophyllales
- Family: Cactaceae
- Subfamily: Cactoideae
- Genus: Cereus
- Species: C. horrispinus

Binomial name
- Cereus horrispinus Backeb.

Synonyms
- Pilocereus horrispinus (Backeb.) Backeb.; Subpilocereus fricii subsp. horrispinus (Backeb.) Guiggi; Subpilocereus horrispinus (Backeb.) Backeb.; Pilocereus wagenaarii Croizat; Subpilocereus ottonis Backeb.; Subpilocereus wagenaarii (Croizat) Backeb.

= Cereus horrispinus =

Species of flowering plant

Cereus horrispinus is a species of cactus in the genus Cereus.

== Description ==
Cereus horrispinus is a species of Cereus native to Colombia and Venezuela; This plant grows in the seasonally dry tropical areas. It is semi-decumbent cactus can grow up to 5 meters tall with bluish-green stems. These stems grow up to 1 meter tall, and 5cm inches in diameter. The areoles of this species bear grey spines. From the areoles, sweet-scented nocturnal flowers emerge. Its flowers grow up to 17cm, its greenish fruits are spherical to egg-shaped, revealing their edible flesh.

== Gallery ==
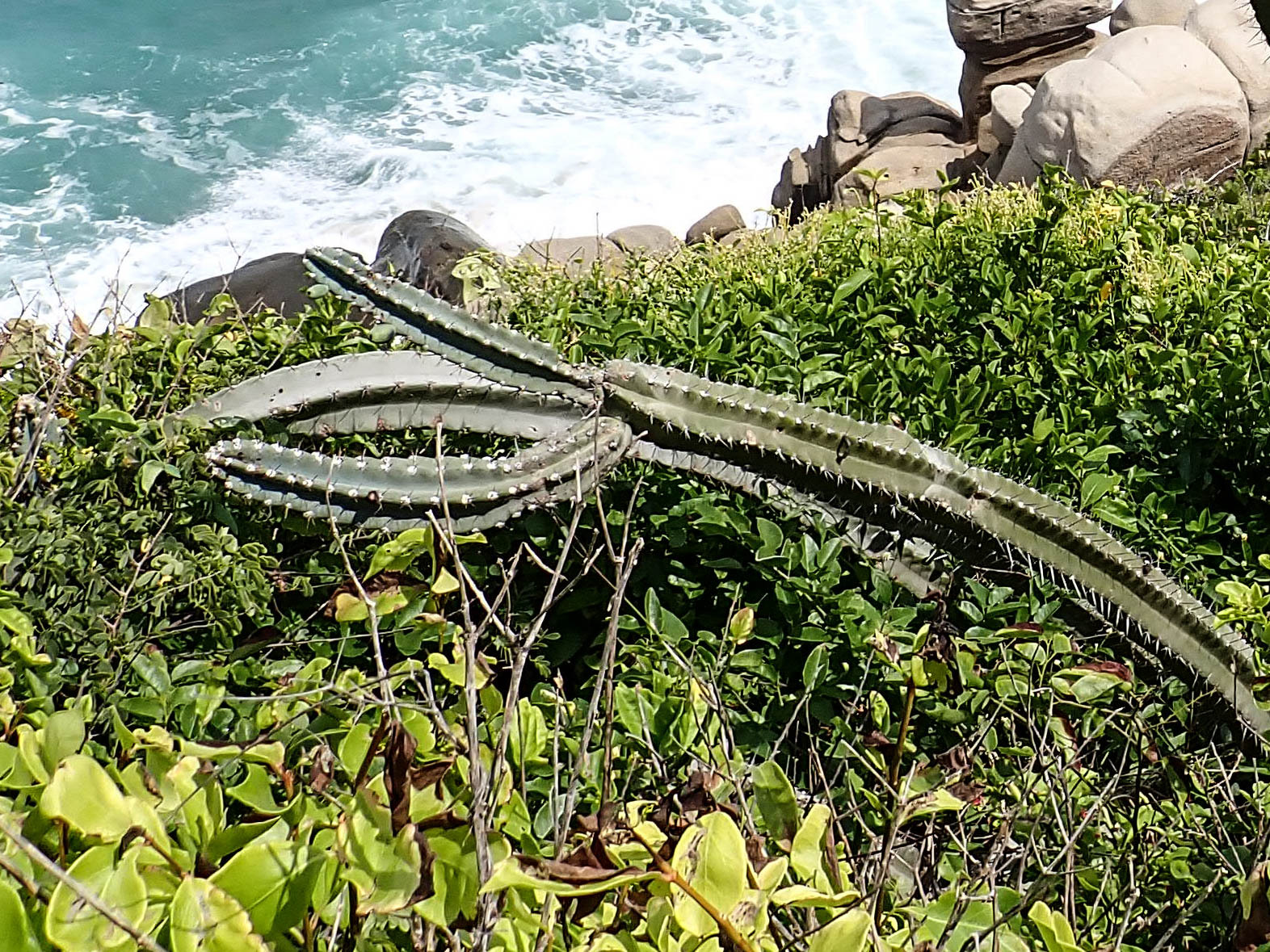
Cereus horrispinus in habitat

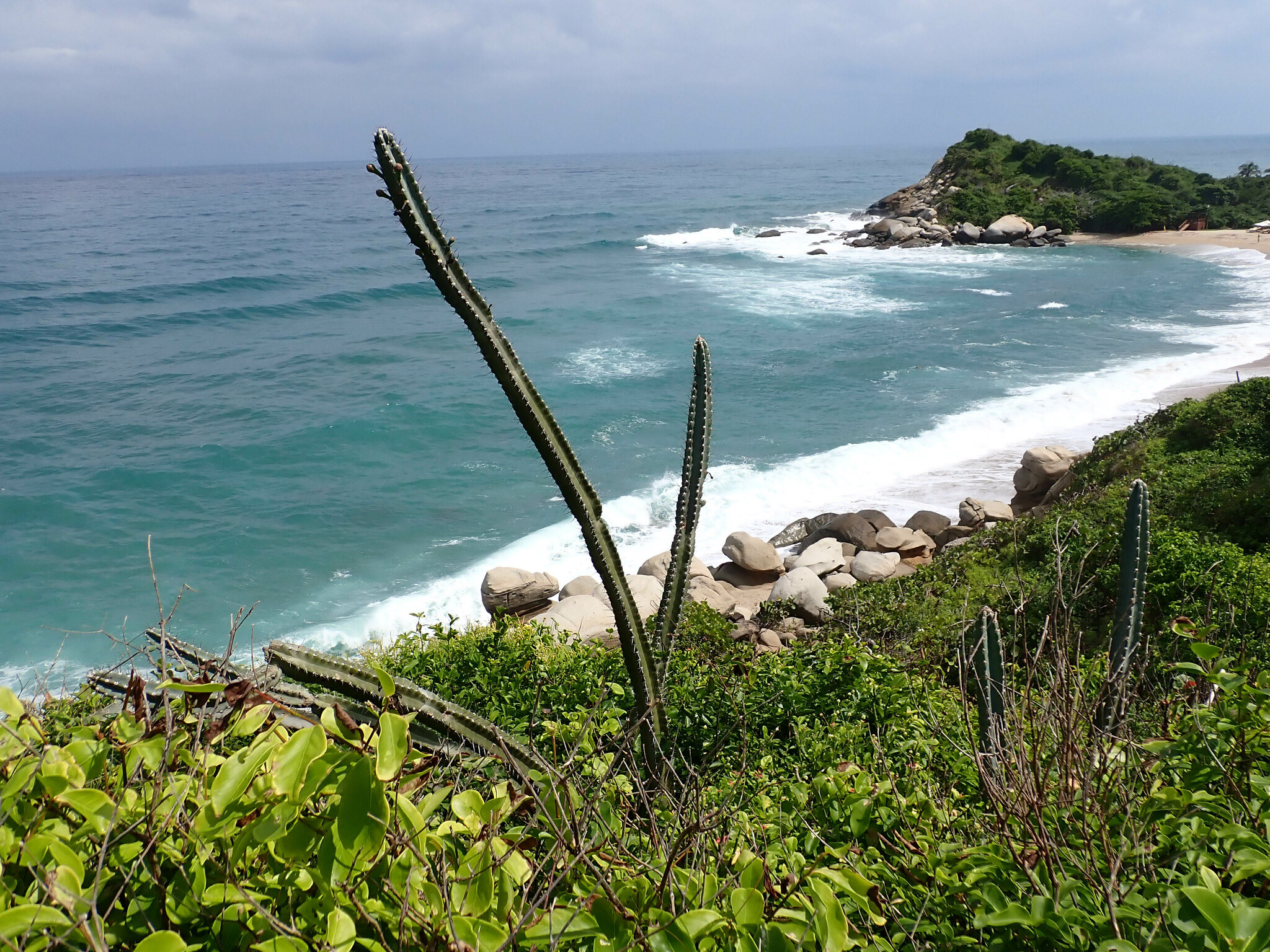
Cereus horrispinus in habitat
