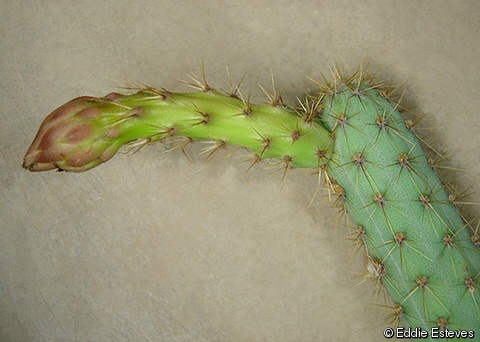

Scientific classification
- Kingdom: Plantae
- Clade: Tracheophytes
- Clade: Angiosperms
- Clade: Eudicots
- Order: Caryophyllales
- Family: Cactaceae
- Subfamily: Cactoideae
- Genus: Cereus
- Species: C. alex-bragae

Binomial name
- Cereus alex-bragae (P.J.Braun & Esteves) M.Köhler

Synonyms
- Estevesia alex-bragae P.J.Braun & Esteves; Mirabella alex-bragae (P.J.Braun & Esteves) Guiggi

= Cereus alex-bragae =

Species of cactus

Cereus alex-bragae (syn. Mirabella alex-bragae) is a species of flowering plant in the genus Cereus. This species is native to the seasonally dry area of Goiás, Brazil.

== Description ==
Cereus alex-bragae is a succulent tree native to the seasonally dry areas of Goias. It grows up to 4 feet (1.2 m) tall in nature. The flowers are white and tubular, emitting a strong fragrance, and the fruit are yellowish, globose, and with edible pulp.

== Taxonomy ==
Cereus alex-bragae was first described in 2009 by Pierre Braun and Eddie Esteves as Estevesia alex-bragae. Then in 2024, Estevesia was found to be synonymous with Cereus, as a result, Estevesia alex-bragae was transferred to Cereus.

== Gallery ==
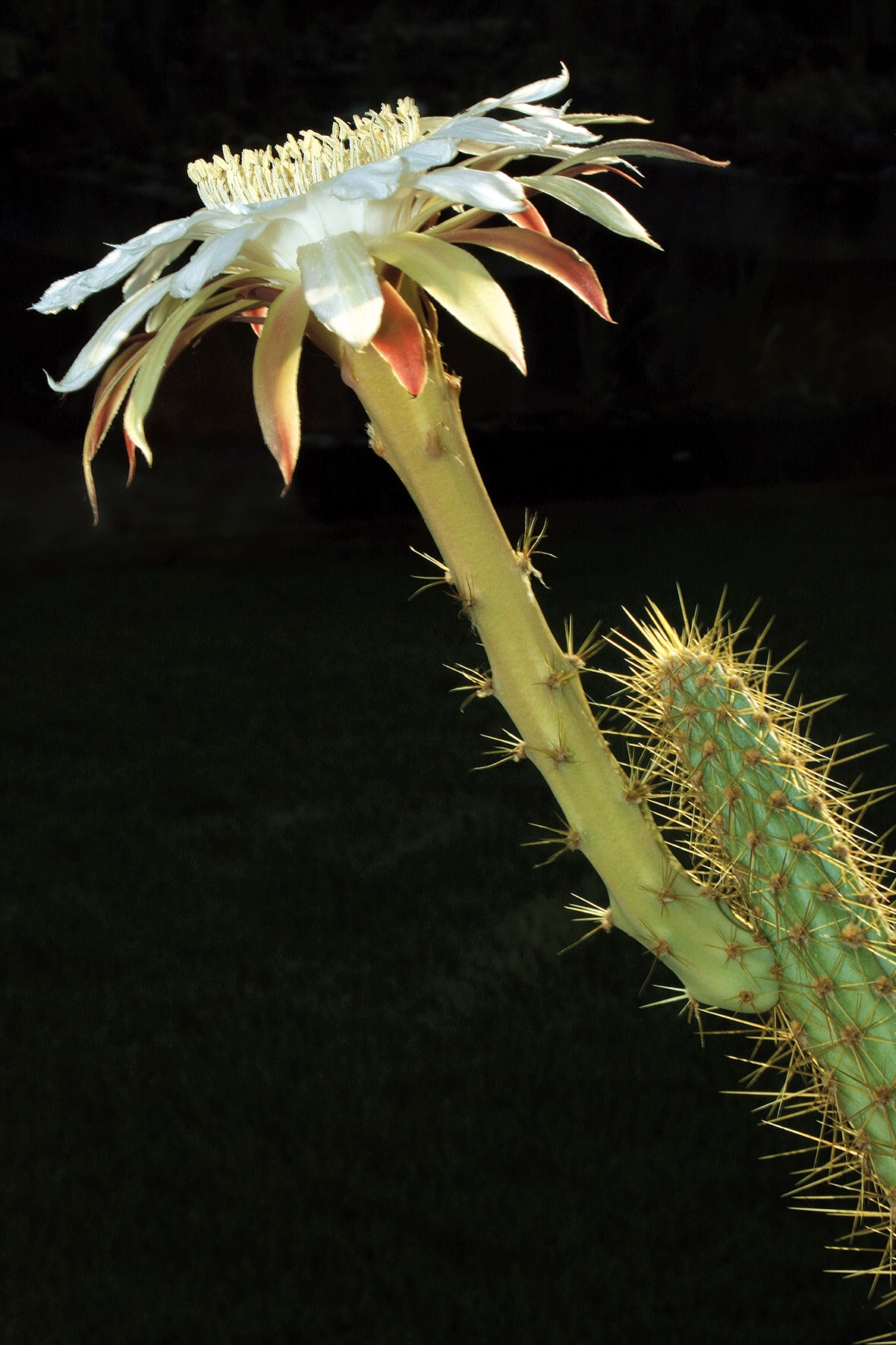
Flower

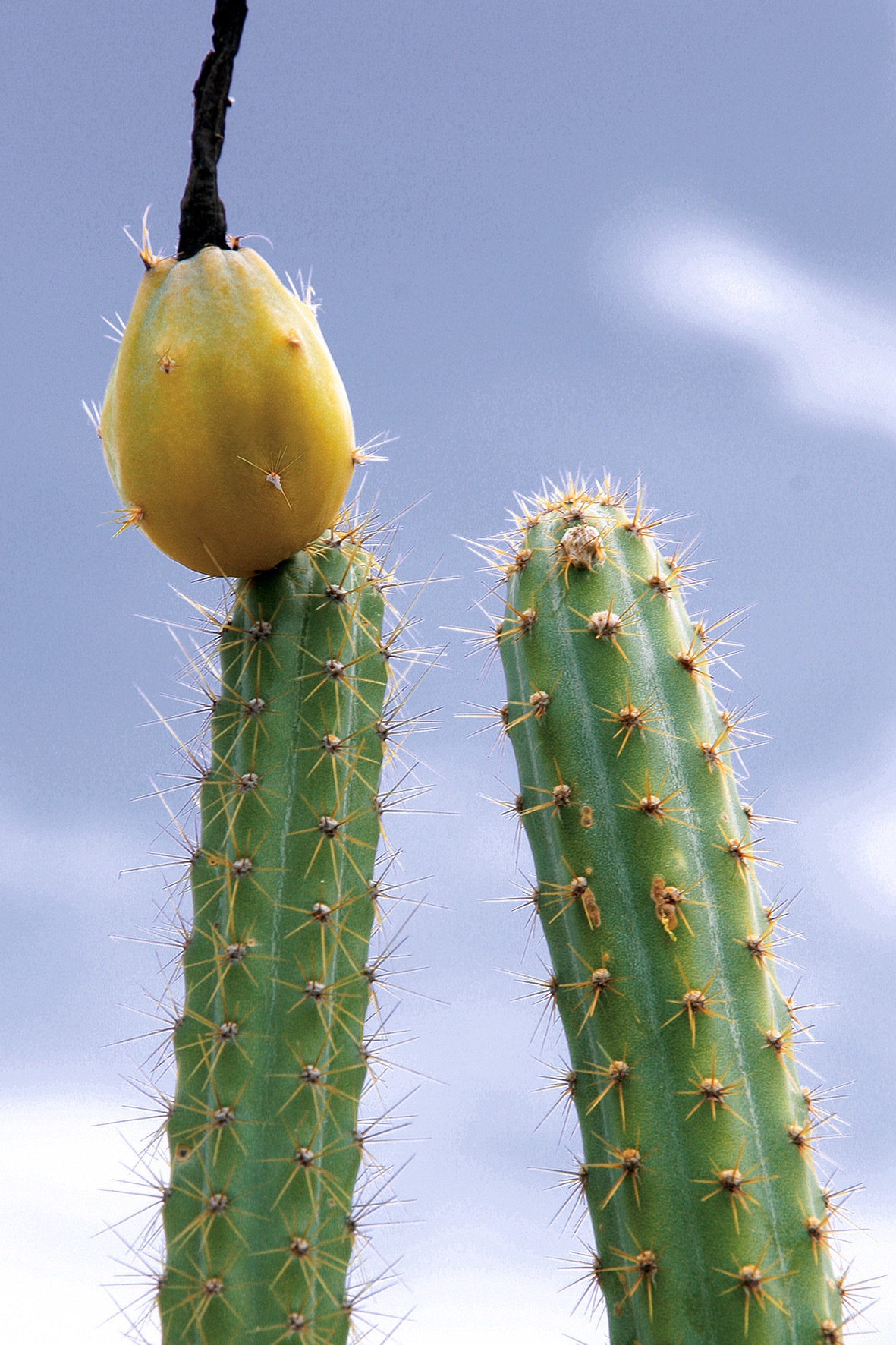
Fruit

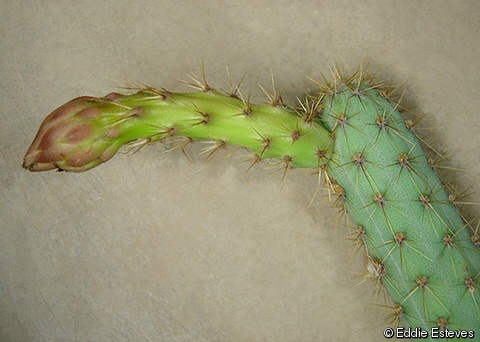
Flower bud
