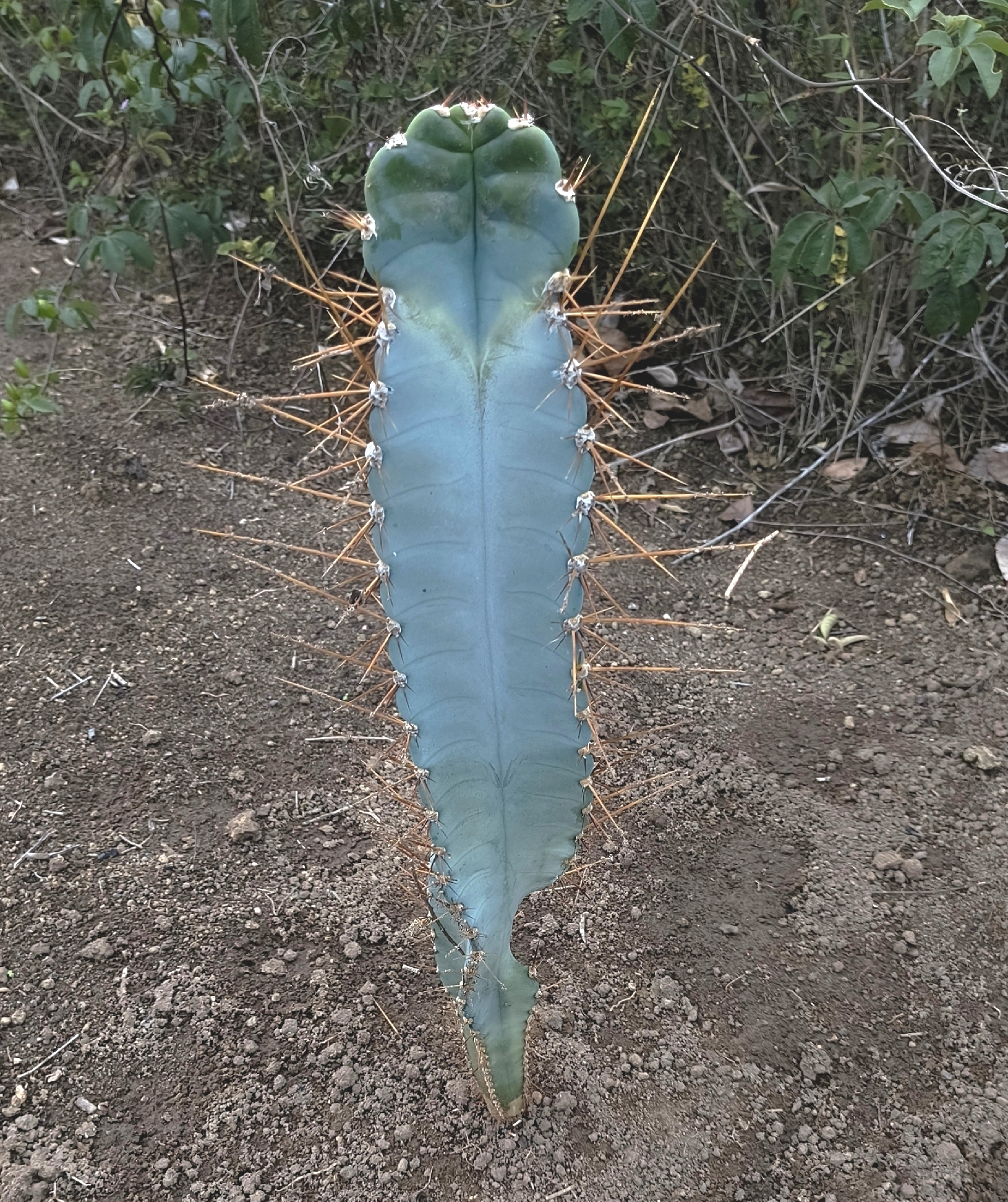

Scientific classification
- Kingdom: Plantae
- Clade: Embryophytes
- Clade: Tracheophytes
- Clade: Spermatophytes
- Clade: Angiosperms
- Clade: Eudicots
- Order: Caryophyllales
- Family: Cactaceae
- Subfamily: Cactoideae
- Genus: Cereus
- Species: C. ingens

Binomial name
- Cereus ingens N.P.Taylor & M.Machado

= Cereus ingens =

Species of plant

Cereus ingens is a species of plant native to the Brazilian states of Bahia and Minas Gerais. It is commonly referred to as Mandacaru-da-mata.

== Description ==
Cereus ingens is one of the largest in the genus Cereus, growing to upwards of 15 meters. Cereus ingens is comparable to Cereus jamacaru, though the plants are more robust and have fewer ribs. Young plants are a glaucous blue, and often spiral. Flowers and fruit are also considerably larger than any other species in the genus.

== Dispersal ==
Unlike other species of Cereus, the fruits fall to the ground and are dispersed by rats, rather than birds.

== Phylogeny ==
In 2023, a study shown that Cereus ingens is closely related to Cereus fernambucensis.

- Cereus ingens
- - Cereus fernambucensis
  - Cereus insularis

== Etymology ==
The epithet "ingens" refers to the large stature of the species compared to other members of Cereus.
