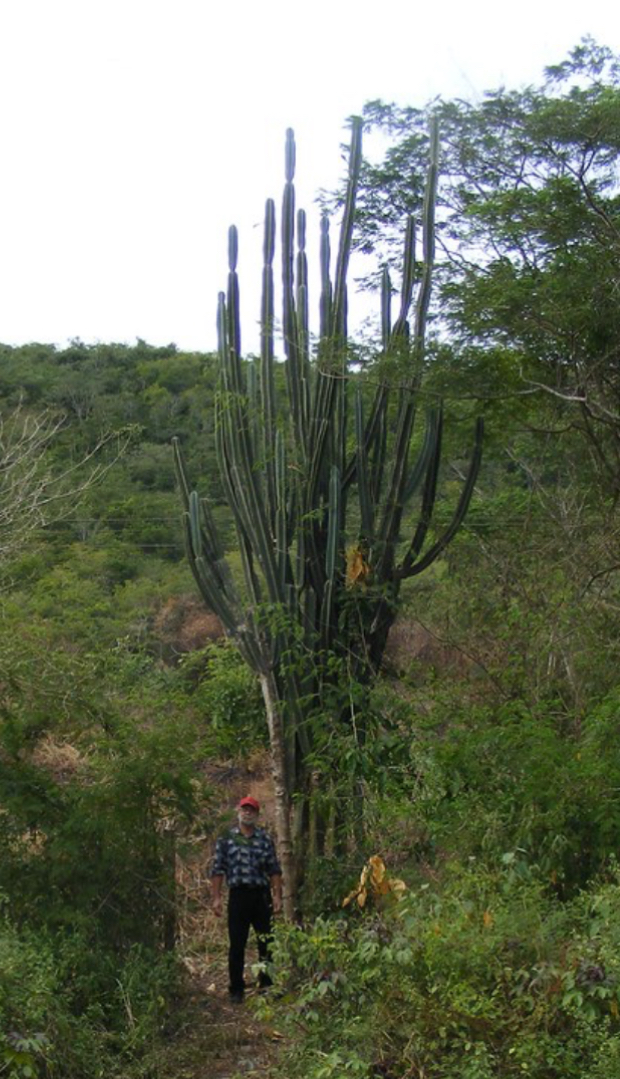

Scientific classification
- Kingdom: Plantae
- Clade: Tracheophytes
- Clade: Angiosperms
- Clade: Eudicots
- Order: Caryophyllales
- Family: Cactaceae
- Subfamily: Cactoideae
- Genus: Cereus
- Species: C. trigonodendron

Binomial name
- Cereus trigonodendron K.Schum. ex Ule

Synonyms
- Cereus braunii Cárdenas

= Cereus trigonodendron =

Species of flowering plant

Cereus trigonodendron, synonym Cereus braunii, is a species of flowering plant in the family Cactaceae, native to Bolivia, North Brazil and Peru. It was first described in 1908 by Ernst Heinrich Georg Ule who attributed the name to Karl Moritz Schumann. Ule described Cereus trigonodendron as a striking triangular columnar cactus, up to 15 m tall, with large purple flowers at the top.
