= Cereus serruliflorus =

Conservation status
- Endangered (IUCN 3.1)

Scientific classification
- Kingdom: Plantae
- Clade: Tracheophytes
- Clade: Angiosperms
- Clade: Eudicots
- Order: Caryophyllales
- Family: Cactaceae
- Subfamily: Cactoideae
- Tribe: Cereeae
- Subtribe: Cereinae
- Genus: Cereus
- Species: C. serruliflorus

Binomial name
- Cereus serruliflorus Haw.

Synonyms
- Cereus ayisyen M.H.J.van der Meer; Cereus haitiensis A.R.Franck & Peguero, nom. illeg.; Serrulatocereus haitiensis B.P.R.Chéron, nom. superfl.; Serrulatocereus serruliflorus (Haw.) Guggi; Harrisia serruliflora (Haw.) Lourteig

Species of cactus

Cereus serruliflorus, synonym Serrulatocereus serruliflorus, is a species of cactus endemic to northwestern and central Haiti.

== Description ==
Cereus serruliflorus grows tree-like with sparse to richly branched, upright shoots and reaches heights of up to 4 meters. The cylindrical, green stems are slender with 10-15 ribs have a diameter of 3-4.5 centimeters. The areoles are round and 3-4 mm wide with up to 20 spines. Spines are 3.5 -7 cm long and straw color. The slightly pink flowers are 3 centimeters long and 6-8 mm wide. The egg-shaped fruits are yellow gree, up to 9-11 centimeters long, and 3.5-6 cm wide. They contain a gray to white pulp with black seeds.

== Taxonomy ==
The species was first described in 1830 as Cereus serruliflorus by Adrian Hardy Haworth. In 2018, Alessandro Guiggi established the genus Serrulatocereus, transferring C. serruliflorus to it as Serrulatocereus serruliflorus. Independently, in 2017, what was considered to be a different species was described as Cereus haitiensis. However, this was an illegitimate name as it had already been used for another species. Accordingly, in 2019, the name Cereus ayisyen was published as a replacement for C. haitiensis. The specific epithet ayisyen means "Haitian" in Haitian Creole. As of January 2026, Cereus serruliflorus is considered the correct name by Plants of the World Online, with C. ayisyen being a synonym.

== Distribution ==
Plants are found growing on limestone hills of northwestern and central Haiti.
