= Mirabelle (disambiguation) =

Mirabelle most often refers to a type of small, yellow prune.

Mirabelle may also refer to:

- Mirabelle (name), feminine given name
- Mirabelle (Breda restaurant) - Dutch restaurant
- Mirabelle (London restaurant) - English restaurant

== See also ==
- Mirabel (disambiguation)
