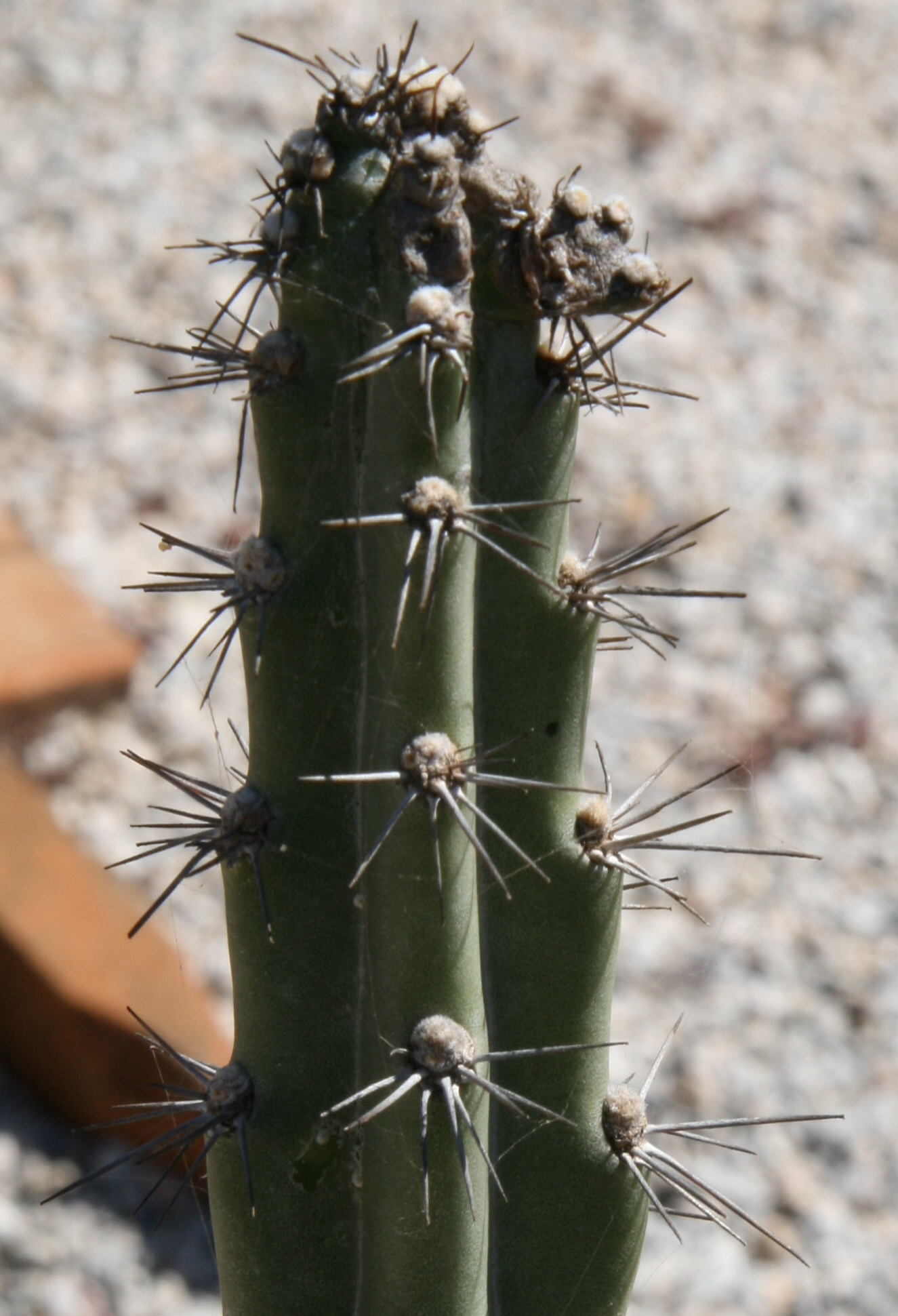
- Mirabella estevesii

Scientific classification
- Kingdom: Plantae
- Clade: Tracheophytes
- Clade: Angiosperms
- Clade: Eudicots
- Order: Caryophyllales
- Family: Cactaceae
- Subfamily: Cactoideae
- Genus: Mirabella; F.Ritter

Type species
- Mirabella albicaulis

Species
- See text.

Synonyms
- Cereus subg. Mirabella (F.Ritter) N.P.Taylor

= Mirabella (plant) =

Genus of cacti

Mirabella is a former genus of flowering plant in the family Cactaceae, native to Brazil. The genus was erected by Friedrich Ritter in 1979. It has been reclassified as the subgenus Mirabella of the genus Cereus. This taxonomic change is accepted by the Plants of the World Online.

== Former species ==
| Image | Name | Distribution |
|---|---|---|
| | Mirabella albicaulis (Britton & Rose) F.Ritter | Northeast and Southeast Brazil. |
| | Mirabella alex-bragae (P.J.Braun & Esteves) Guiggi | Goias |
| | Mirabella estevesii (P.J.Braun) Guiggi | Minas Gerais, Brazil. |
| | Mirabella minensis F.Ritter | Brazil. |
