= Timeline of Breda =

The following is a timeline of the history of the municipality of Breda, Netherlands.

== Prior to 20th century ==
- 1252 – Breda granted city status.
- 1267 – Begijnhof (Breda) founded.
- 1321 – Tuesday market begins.
- 1330 – Building of the city wall started.
- 1350 – Breda Castle built.
- 1351 – Polanen Castle besieged.
- 1394 – Polanen Castle demolished.
- 1410 – Grote Kerk (Breda) begun.
- 1534 – Fortification of the city began.
- 1536 – "Poor relief" established.
- 1547 – Grote Kerk finished.
- 1566 – Iconoclasm by Protestants.
- 1575 – Spanish-Dutch Breda peace conference held in city.
- 1581 – Capture of Breda by Spanish troops.
- 1590 – 4 March: Capture of Breda (1590) by Maurice, Prince of Orange and Dutch-English forces.
- 1624 – 28 August: Siege of Breda begins.
- 1625 – 5 June: Siege of Breda ends; Spanish in power.
- 1637
  - 21 July: Siege of Breda by Dutch forces begins.
  - 10 October: Siege of Breda ends; Breda taken by Dutch forces of Frederick Henry, Prince of Orange.
  - Grote Kerk (church) becomes Protestant.
- 1648 – Breda becomes part of Holland per Treaty of Westphalia.
- 1650 – 1 May: English-Scottish treaty signed in Breda.
- 1660 – April: Charles II of England proclaims the Declaration of Breda while passing through town.
- 1667 – 31 July: Anglo-Dutch treaty signed in Breda.
- 1696 – Breda Castle built by William, prince of Orange.
- 1746/48 – British-French bilateral negotiations at the Congress of Breda.
- 1768 – Breda Town Hall remodeled.
- 1793 – Siege of Breda; French in power.
- 1813 – Siege of Breda; French military ousted.
- 1817 – Breda coat of arms adopted.
- 1828 – Royal Military Academy established.
- 1837 – St. Anthony of Padua Cathedral built.
- 1845 – Synagogue built on Schoolstraat.
- 1853 – Roman Catholic Diocese of Breda established.
- 1855 – Breda railway station opens.
- 1863 – Breda–Eindhoven railway begins operating.
- 1870 – City directory begins publication.
- 1883 – Ginnekensche Tramweg Maatschappij tram begins operating.
- 1886 – Breda courthouse and Koepelgevangenis (prison) built.
- 1890 – Breda-Oudenbosch tram line begins operating.
- 1893 – Breda Haagpoort-Breda SS tram line in operation.
- 1894 – Population: 24,397.
- 1900 – Population: 26,296.

== 20th century ==
- 1901 – Tram Breda-Mastbosch begins operating.
- 1907 – Eppo Paul van Lanschot becomes mayor.
- 1912 – NAC Breda football club founded.
- 1919
  - Population: 30,044.
  - Willem van Sonsbeeck becomes mayor.
- 1920 – Gemeentetram Breda (tram) begins operating.
- 1921 – NAC Breda wins its first Dutch football championship.
- 1940 – German occupation during World War II begins.
- 1942 – Ginneken and Princenhage become part of Breda.

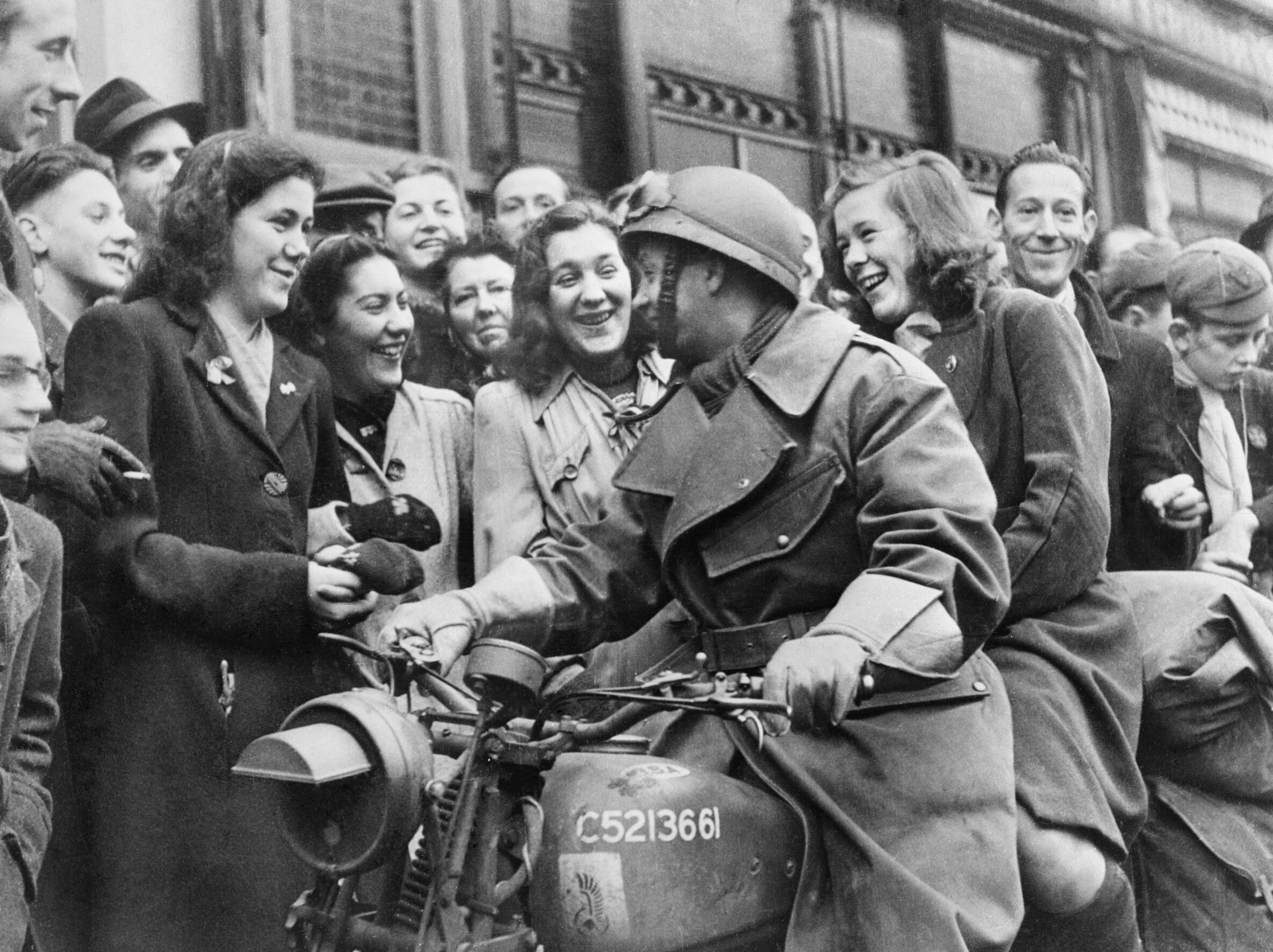
Polish soldiers welcomed by the residents of Breda following the liberation, 1944

- 1944
  - City liberated by the 1st Polish Armoured Division of General Stanisław Maczek.
  - De Stem newspaper begins publication.
- 1952 – Breda flag design adopted.
- 1953 – Our Lady of Perpetual Help Church, Breda built.
- 1955 – Mirabelle (Breda restaurant) in business.
- 1963 – Polish cemetery in Breda established in Princenhage.
- 1966 – Breda University of Applied Sciences established
- 1975 – Breda railway station rebuilt.
- 1981 – Generaal Maczek Museum established.
- 1990 – Ed Nijpels becomes mayor.
- 1991 – Sister city partnership signed between Breda and Wrocław, Poland.
- 1995 – Chassé Theater built.
- 1996
  - Rat Verlegh Stadion opened.
  - Chris Rutten becomes mayor.
- 1998 – BN DeStem newspaper in publication.
- 2000 – Population: 160,650.

== 21st century ==
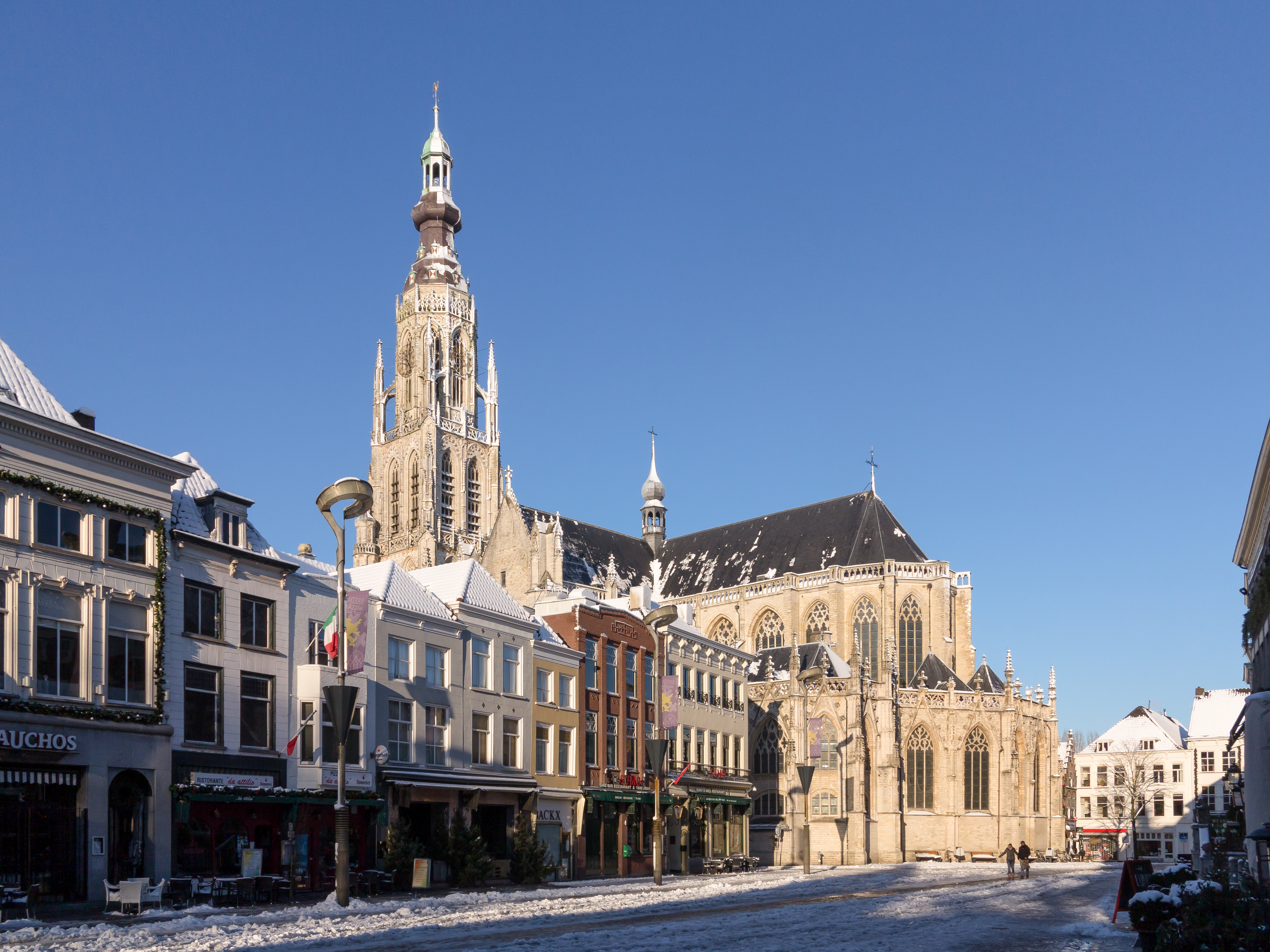
Grote Markt and Grote Kerk in 2014

- 2001
  - City joins regional BrabantStad group.
  - Moooi in business.
- 2004 – Peter van der Velden becomes mayor.
- 2007 – Redhead Day begins.
- 2014 – Population: 179,665.
- 2015 – Paul Depla becomes mayor.

== See also ==
- Breda history
- History of Breda
- List of mayors of Breda
- List of rijksmonuments in Breda
- Timelines of other municipalities in the Netherlands: Amsterdam, Delft, Eindhoven, Groningen, Haarlem, The Hague, 's-Hertogenbosch, Leiden, Maastricht, Nijmegen, Rotterdam, Utrecht

== Bibliography ==
in English

- Thomas Nugent (1749), "Breda", The Grand Tour, vol. 1: Netherlands, London: S. Birt, hdl:2027/mdp.39015030762598
- Abraham Rees (1819), "Breda", The Cyclopaedia, London: Longman, Hurst, Rees, Orme & Brown, hdl:2027/uc2.ark:/13960/t4vh5t74q
- "Breda". Galignani's Traveller's Guide through Holland and Belgium (4th ed.). Paris: A. and W. Galignani. 1822. hdl:2027/njp.32101073846667.
- William Henry Overall, ed. (1870). "Breda". Dictionary of Chronology. London: William Tegg. hdl:2027/uc2.ark:/13960/t9m32q949.
- "Breda", Handbook for Travellers in Holland and Belgium (20th ed.), London: John Murray, 1881, hdl:2027/hvd.hn2ha2
- "Breda". Chambers's Encyclopaedia. London. 1901. hdl:2027/uc2.ark:/13960/t81j9pj6k.
- "Breda", Holland: its Rail, Tram, and Waterways (3rd ed.), London: A. and C. Black, 1908
- "Breda", Belgium and Holland (15th ed.), Leipzig: Karl Baedeker, 1910, hdl:2027/uc1.b3129294
- "Breda" . Encyclopædia Britannica. Vol. 4 (11th ed.). 1910. p. 486.
- Benjamin Vincent (1910), "Breda", Haydn's Dictionary of Dates (25th ed.), London: Ward, Lock & Co., hdl:2027/uc2.ark:/13960/t41r6xh8t

in Dutch

- Thomas Ernst van Goor (1744), Beschryving der stadt en lande van Breda (in Dutch), Hague: Jacobus van den Kieboom, OCLC 19063210, OL 6970701M
- Abraham Jacob van der Aa (1840). "Breda". Aardrijkskundig woordenboek der Nederlanden [Geographical dictionary of the Netherlands] (in Dutch). Vol. 2. Gorinchem: Jacobus Noorduyn. hdl:2027/mdp.39015039363968 – via HathiTrust.
- Henri Zondervan, ed. (1915), "Breda", Winkler Prins' Geillustreerde Encyclopaedie (in Dutch), vol. 4 (4th ed.), Amsterdam: Uitgevers-Maatschappy „Elsevier“, hdl:2027/mdp.39015068310153
- G. van Herwijnen, ed. (1978). "Noord-Brabant: Breda". Bibliografie van de stedengeschiedenis van Nederland [Bibliography of Urban History in the Netherlands] (in Dutch). Brill. pp. 279+. ISBN 90-04-05700-5.
