= Mirabel =

Mirabel, Mirabelle or Mirabell may refer to:

- Mirabel (name), a female given name

== Places ==
=== Austria ===
- Mirabell Palace, in Salzburg

=== Canada ===
- Mirabel, Quebec, a city northwest of Montreal
- Mirabel station, a railway station in Mirabel, Quebec
- Montréal–Mirabel International Airport in Quebec
- Mirabel (federal electoral district), a federal constituency in Quebec
- Mirabel (provincial electoral district), a provincial constituency in Quebec
- Mirabel (territory equivalent to a regional county municipality), a statistical area in Quebec, also a census division

=== France ===
- Mirabel, Ardèche, a commune in the Ardèche department
- Mirabel, Tarn-et-Garonne, a commune in the Tarn-et-Garonne department
- Mirabel-aux-Baronnies, a commune in the Drôme department
- Mirabel-et-Blacons, a commune in the Drôme department
- Saint-Jean-Mirabel, a commune in the Lot department

=== Israel ===
- Mirabel (castle), a Crusader castle now part of Migdal Afek national park

=== Spain ===
- Mirabel, Spain, a municipality in the province of Cáceres and autonomous community of Extremadura

=== United States ===
- Mirabel, California, a former settlement

== Other uses ==
- HydroSerre Mirabel, a Canadian hydroponic produce company
- Mir@bel, a French online database of journals and magazines
- Mirabell: Books of Number, a volume of poetry by James Merrill, published in 1978

== See also ==
- Maribel (disambiguation)
- Mirabal
- Mirabelle (disambiguation)
- Mirabella (disambiguation)
- Mirabello (disambiguation)
