= Mirabel (name) =

- Pronunciation: /ˈmɪrəbɛl/
- Gender: Female

Origin
- Language: Latin
- Origin: mirabilis
- Meaning: wondrous
- Region of origin: Europe

Other names
- Alternative spelling: Mirabelle, Mirabell
- Derivative: Mirabella
- Related names: Maribel, Marabel, Maribella

Mirabel is a female name stemming from the Latin word mirabilis, meaning "wondrous" or "of wondrous beauty". It was used as both a male and female name in the Middle Ages, but is now almost exclusively female.

== Variations ==
- Mirabelle
- Milabel
- Mirabell
- Mirabella
- Mirabela
- Mira
- Myrabel
- Beli

== People ==
- Mirabel Osler (1925-2016), English writer and garden designer
- Mirabelle Thovex (born 1991), French snowboarder

== Fictional characters ==
- Mirabell, male protagonist in William Congreve's 1700 play The Way of the World
- Mirabelle Buttersfield, role played by Claire Danes in Shopgirl
- Mirabel Cotton, a character in Lucy Maud Montgomery's 1909 novel Anne of Avonlea
- Mirabelle Haywood, a.k.a. Aiko Seno, a character from the Japanese anime television series Ojamajo Doremi
- Mama Mirabelle, the protagonist of the animated series Mama Mirabelle's Home Movies
- Mirabella, a pirate NPC of renowned beauty and potential wife from the video game King's Bounty: The Legend
- Mirabel, the final and immortal incarnation of Fate from Erin Morgenstern's 2019 novel "The Starless Sea"
- Mirabel Madrigal, the main protagonist in the 2021 animated Disney film Encanto
- Mirabelle, one of the main characters from the 2023 video game In Stars and Time

== Places ==
- Mirabel (castle)
- Mirabel - Ville du Québec, Canada

== See also ==
- Maribel (disambiguation)
- Mirabella (disambiguation)
- Mirabello (disambiguation)
