= Mirabella (disambiguation) =

Mirabella was a women's magazine published from 1989 to 2000.

Mirabella may also refer to:

== Geography ==
- Mirabella Eclano, an Italian municipality in the Province of Avellino
- Mirabella Imbaccari, an Italian municipality in the Province of Catania
- Mirabella Fortress (Peovica), a Croatian fortress located above town of Omiš
- Mirabella Portland, a residential tower in Portland, Oregon
- Gulf of Mirabella, a Greek gulf of the island of Crete
- Passo di Mirabella, an Italian civil parish of the municipality of Mirabella Eclano (AV)

== People ==
- Erin Mirabella (b. 1978), American cyclist
- Grace Mirabella (1929–2021), American journalist
- Michele Mirabella (b. 1943), Italian TV and radio presenter
- Paul Mirabella (b. 1954), American baseball player
- Roberto Mirabella (b. 1966), Argentine politician
- Sophie Mirabella (b. 1968), Australian politician
- Vincenzo Mirabella (1570–1624), Italian archaeologist, historian and architect

== Television ==
- Mirabella (TV series), a 2014 Philippine drama

== Other ==
- Mirabella V, a sloop rigged super yacht
- Mirabella (plant), a genus of cactus
  - Mirabella minensis, a cactus species
- Mirabella (planthopper), an insect genus in the Delphacini
- Stigmella mirabella, a moth species found in the Amur and Primorye regions of Russia

== See also ==
- Mirabelle plum, a fruit of the Mirabelle prune tree
- Mirabel (disambiguation)
- Mirabello (disambiguation)
