= Mirabal =

Mirabal is a surname. Notable people with the surname include:

- The Mirabal sisters, natives of the Dominican Republic who opposed the dictatorship of Rafael Leónidas Trujillo
- Robert Mirabal, Pueblo musician and Native American flute player
- Jesús Mirabal, former Cuban decathlete
- Rafita Mirabal (born 1997), Mexican bullfighter
- Manuel "Guajiro" Mirabal, Cuban trumpeter

== See also ==
- Hermanas Mirabal Province, a province of the Dominican Republic
- Mirabel
