= Tommaso Vincidor =

Italian painter (1493–1536)

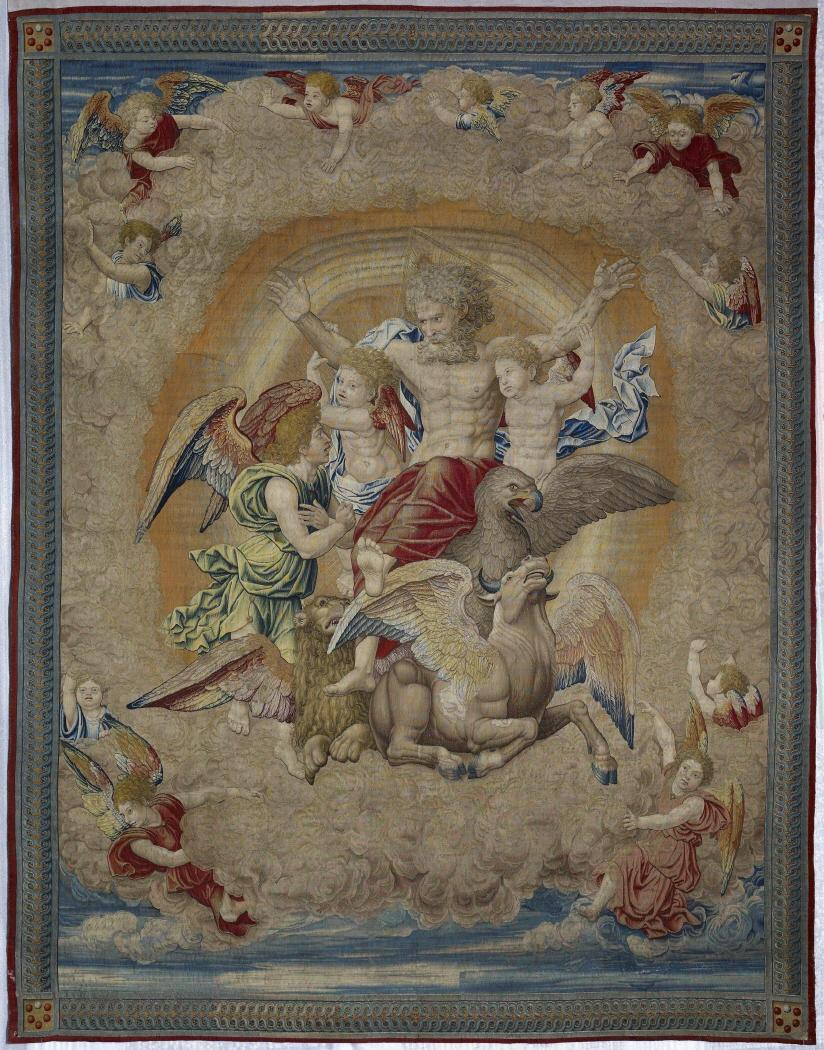
Pieter van Aelst's workshop, Brussels. Cartoon by Tommaso Vincidor based on a Raphael Sanzio design.

Tommaso di Andrea Vincidor (1493 – 1536) was an Italian Renaissance painter and architect who trained with Raphael and spent most of his career in the Netherlands. He was also called Tommaso Vincitore, Tommaso da Bologna and Thomas Polonier (by Dürer).

He was born in Bologna, and became the pupil of Raphael, whom he helped in the execution of the Raphael Cartoons. Vincidor is further said to have been one of the pupils of Raphael who carried out the frescoes in the Vatican Loggia under his direction. On Raphael's death in 1520 he traveled to Flanders. At Antwerp he formed a friendship with Albrecht Dürer (1521); the German master painted his portrait, and refers to him in his Journal under the name of Thomas Polonier. Later details of the life of Tommaso are vague and scanty. He entered the service of Henry of Nassau at Breda, and was employed in reconstructive and decorative work at the Castle there, and died at Breda, in the Netherlands, in 1536.

== Work of Tommaso Vincidor ==
In the Dutch province North Brabant, in the city Breda, a Brabantine Gothic Church has been built. The Large Church or Church of Our Lady, exhibits arch paintings of Tommaso Vincidor. The arch paintings are part of the Prince Chapel, a chapel of the ancestors of the Dutch royal family.
