= Mirabello =

Mirabello may refer to:

== Places ==
Greece

- Mirabello Bay, a bay in Lasithi, Crete
- Mirabello Province, a former province in Lasithi, Crete

Italy

- Mirabello Castle
- Mirabello, Emilia–Romagna, a frazione of the comune of Terre del Reno, in the Province of Ferrara
- Mirabello Monferrato, a comune in the Province of Alessandria, Piedmont
- Mirabello Sannitico, a comune in the Province of Campobasso, Molise
- Mirabello, a frazione of the comune di Pavia: see Battle of Pavia and Mirabello Castle

== People ==
- Mirabello Cavalori (1520–1572) Italian painter
- Lisa Mirabello, American medical geneticist
- Simon de Mirabello (approx. 1280-1346), Flemish banker, and intermediary regent of Flanders (1340-1345)

== See also ==
- Italian destroyer Carlo Mirabello
- Mirabel
- Mirabella
- Mirabelle
