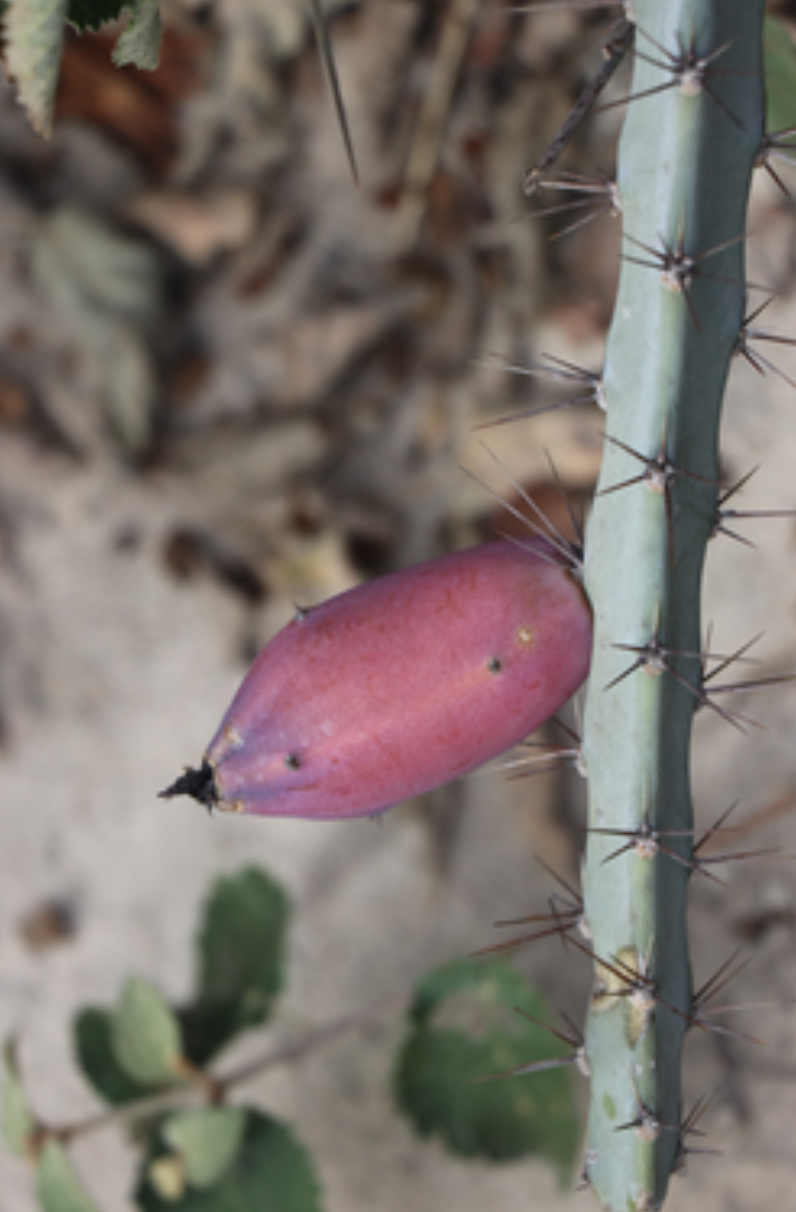
- Fruit

Conservation status
- Least Concern (IUCN 3.1)

Scientific classification
- Kingdom: Plantae
- Clade: Tracheophytes
- Clade: Angiosperms
- Clade: Eudicots
- Order: Caryophyllales
- Family: Cactaceae
- Subfamily: Cactoideae
- Genus: Cereus
- Species: C. albicaulis

Binomial name
- Cereus albicaulis (Britton & Rose) F.Ritter

Synonyms
- Acanthocereus albicaulis Britton & Rose; Mirabella albicaulis (Britton & Rose) Luetzelb.; Monvillea albicaulis (Britton & Rose) R.Kiesling

= Cereus albicaulis =

Species of flowering plant

Cereus albicaulis, is a species of flowering plant in the family Cactaceae, native to Northeast and Southeast Brazil. It was first described by Britton and Rose in 1920 as Acanthocereus albicaulis.

== Description ==
Cereus albicaulis grows as a shrub, with only slightly branched, initially upright, later overhanging and spreading to climbing shoots. The elongated, bluish-white, four-edged shoots have a diameter of 1 to 3 centimeters. There are four sharp-edged, only slightly wavy ribs. The small areoles are brown. The two to six unequal, needle-like spines are brown, swollen at their base and up to 2 centimeters long.

The flowers are white, the elongated, somewhat angular fruits are greyish-purple.

== Distribution ==
Cereus albicaulis is distributed in the Brazilian state of Bahia.

== Taxonomy ==
=== Subspecies ===
There are two recognized subspecies

Image	Name	Distribution
	Cereus albicaulis subsp. albicaulis	Brazil
	Cereus albicaulis subsp. estevesii (F.Ritter) N.P.Taylor & Zappi	Brazil (Minas Gerais)

The first description as Acanthocereus albicaulis was published in 1920 by Nathaniel Lord Britton and Joseph Nelson Rose.

In the IUCN Red List of Threatened Species, the species is listed as "Least Concern (LC)"
