= Grote Kerk (Breda) =

Church building in Breda, the Netherlands

Grote kerk Grote of Onze-Lieve-Vrouwekerk
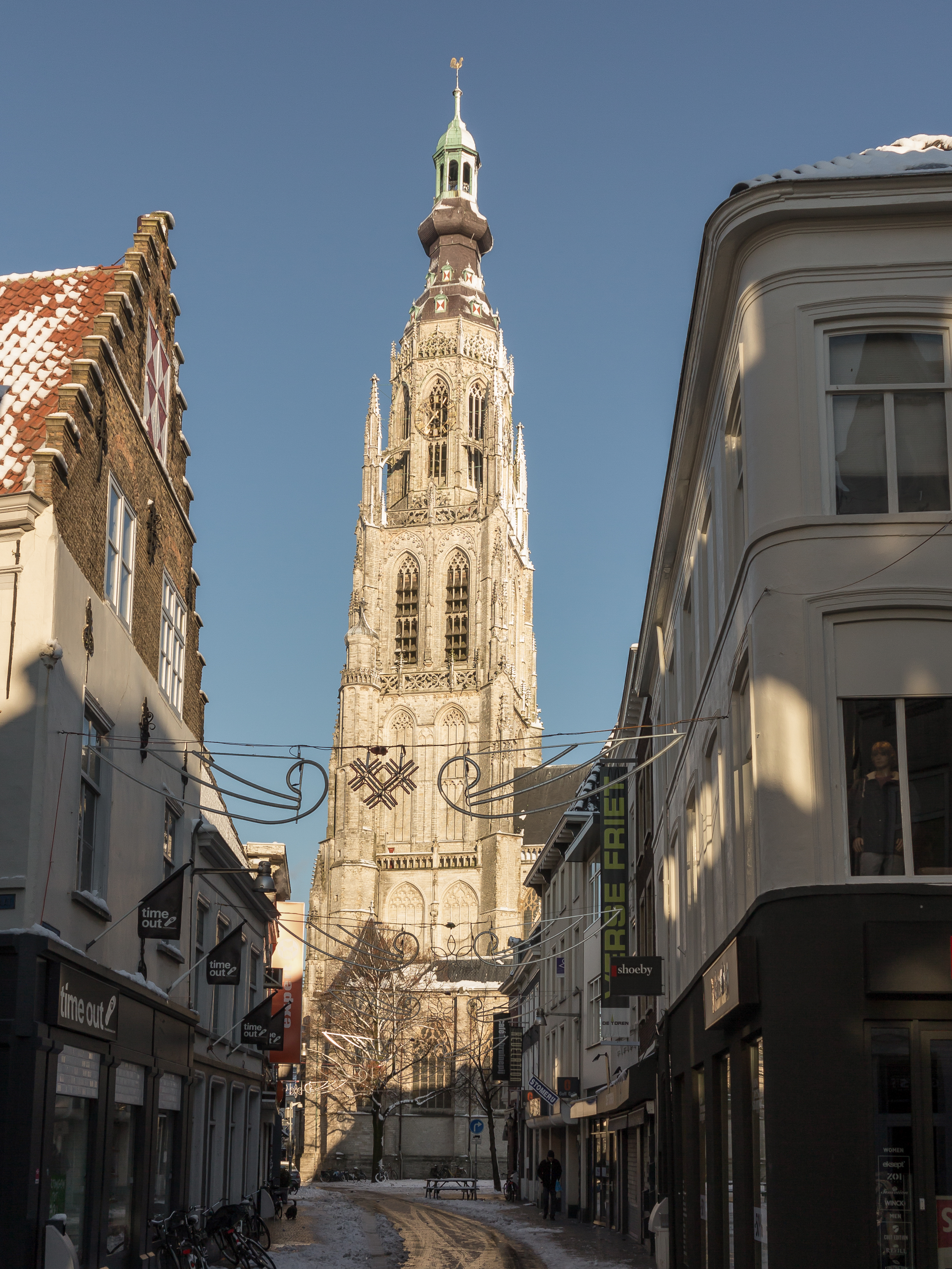
- "Onze Lieve Vrouwekerk"
- Grote kerk Grote of Onze-Lieve-Vrouwekerk
- 51.5890°N 4.7750°E
- Location: Breda, Netherlands
- Denomination: Protestant
- Previous denomination: Roman Catholic

Architecture
- Architectural type: Church
- Style: Gothic
- Groundbreaking: 1410
- Completed: 1547

Specifications
- Height: 97 m (318.24 ft)

The Grote Kerk or Onze-Lieve-Vrouwekerk (Church of Our Lady) is a Reformed Protestant church, being the most important monument and a landmark of Breda. The church is built in the Brabantine Gothic style. The tower of the church is 97 meters tall. The plan is in the shape of a Latin Cross.

== History ==
The first notice of a stone church in Breda is from 1269. In 1410, the construction of the church started with the choir. In 1468, the church was ready but in 1457 the old tower collapsed and between 1468 and 1509 the current tower was built. They continued building until 1547 when the church was finished in its current shape.

In 1566, the Reformation took place and the church was no longer Catholic. In 1637, the church became Protestant.

The tower spire burned in 1694 and the current spire was built in 1702. From 1843 onwards many restorations took place, the last big restoration took place from 1993 until 1998.

The organ in the Grote Kerk of Breda is one of the largest organs in the Netherlands and its history goes back to the 16th century. At that time, the organ only possessed 16 stops. After being displaced several times, the organ arrived at its present location in the church in 1712. After restoration of the church between 1904 and 1956, a new organ was ordered from D.A. Flentrop in Zaandam. In 1969, the new organ was inaugurated.

Nowadays the church also serves as an event hall. Throughout the year there are hundreds of different events being held at the church. With room for 1000 people and in the center of the city, this is an ideal event location. Some of the events are annually recurring and some are just held once. As an example, in 2019 there was a foodtruck festival held inside the church and also a lot of fairs.

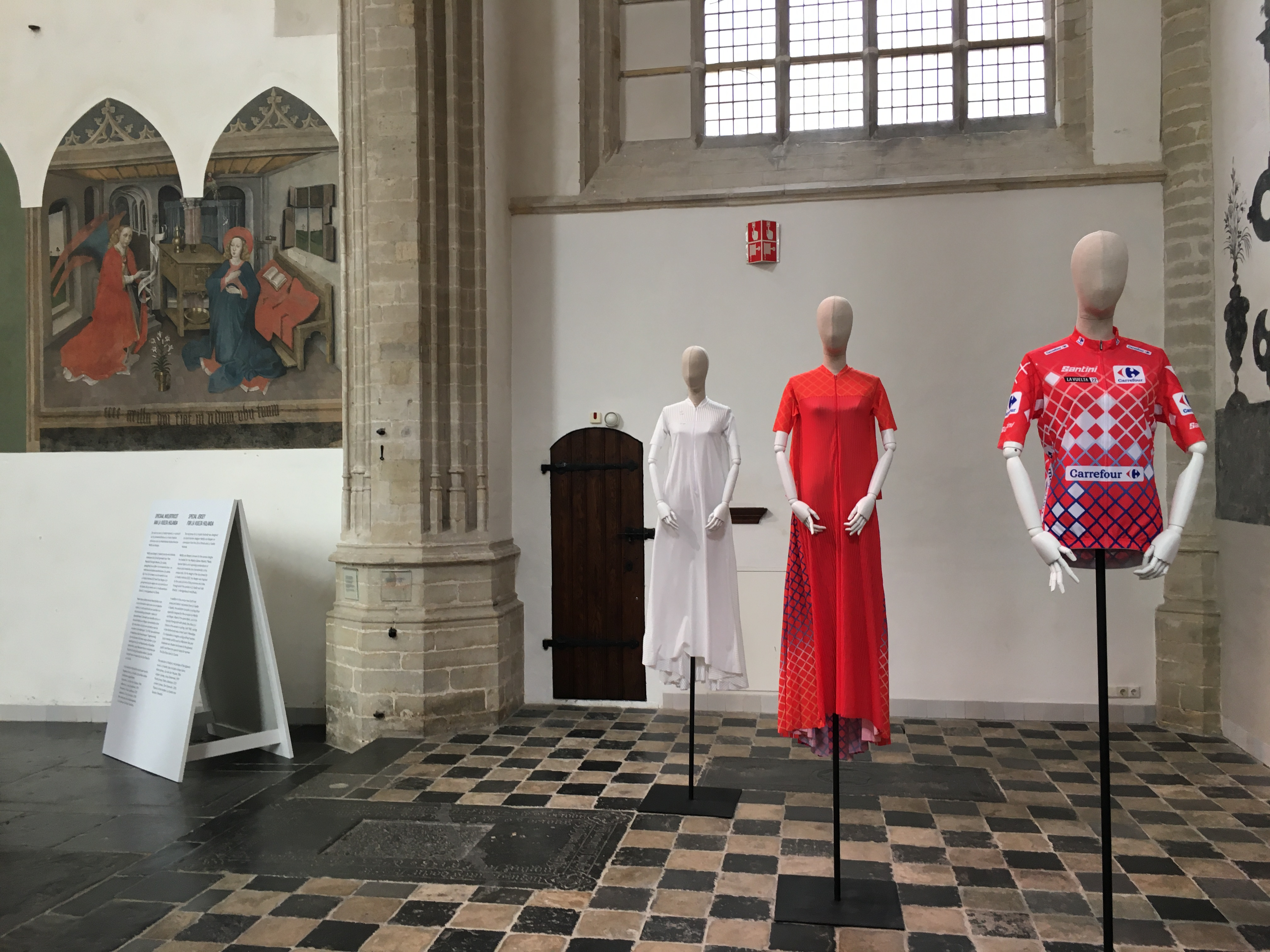
Installation of fashion work on female cyclist inside of Henk Theuns exhibition: Passion and Cycling, in Breda, 2022

=== Mummified cat ===
In 1906 a 15th-century mummified cat was discovered in the inside the walls of the church. The cat is believed to have been deliberately sealed into the church's structure as a foundation sacrifice; a ritual believed to protect buildings from evil spirits. In 2025, the cat was officially named Polleke and returned to public display in the church.

== Prince chapel ==
The Prinsenkapel (Prince chapel) north of the choir is the old mausoleum of the van Nassau-Breda dynasty, ancestors of the Dutch royal family, the House of Orange-Nassau. The chapel was built from 1520 until 1525 on orders of the Lord of Breda, Henry III of Nassau-Breda. Seventeen family members are buried in the chapel.

Among them;

- Engelbert II of Nassau, count of Nassau, lord of Breda etc. great uncle of René of Chalon.
- Henry III of Nassau-Breda, count of Nassau, lord of Breda etc. nephew of Engelbert II of Nassau.
- René of Chalon, first Dutch Prince of Orange, cousin of William the Silent.
  - Also his daughter Maria, who died in the cradle.
- Anna van Egmont, Princess consort of Orange, first wife of William the Silent.
  - also their youngest daughter Maria, who died at the age of 1 year.

William the Silent intended to be buried in the chapel, but Breda was at that time occupied by the Spanish. He and most of his descendants were buried in the mausoleum in the New Church in Delft.

=== Vault paintings ===
A special part of the chapel are the vault paintings from 1533. The frescos are made by the Italian painter Tommaso di Andrea Vincidor (a student of Raphael).

=== Restoration ===
The restoration of the chapel took five years. In 2003 the chapel was reopened to the public. The vault paintings were completely restored, all adaptations from later periods were removed and the original painting restored.

== Gallery ==
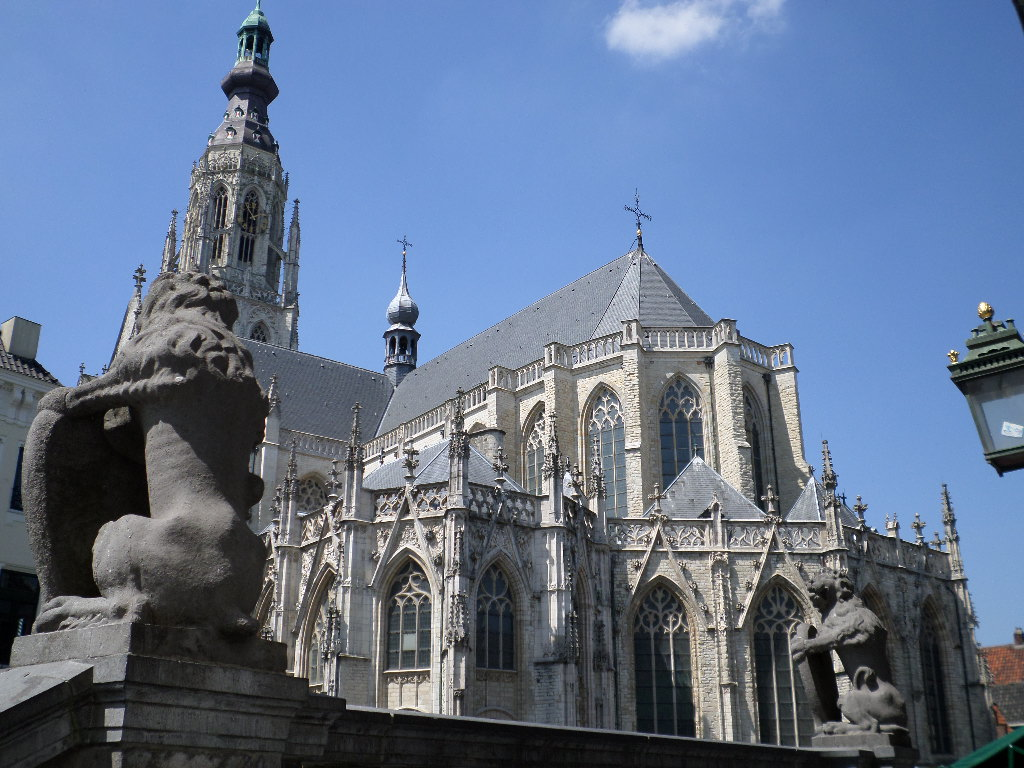

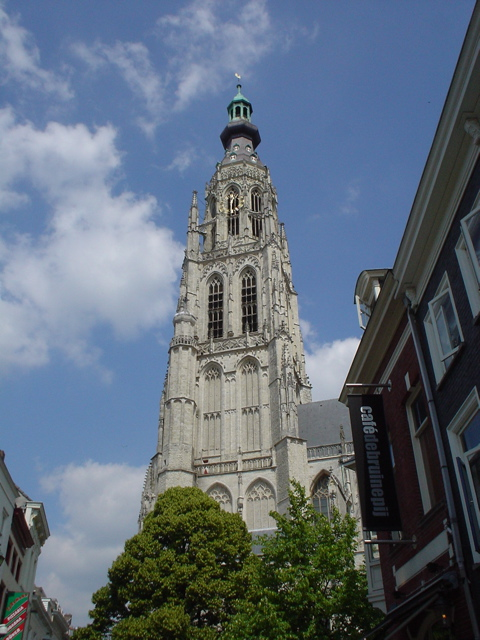

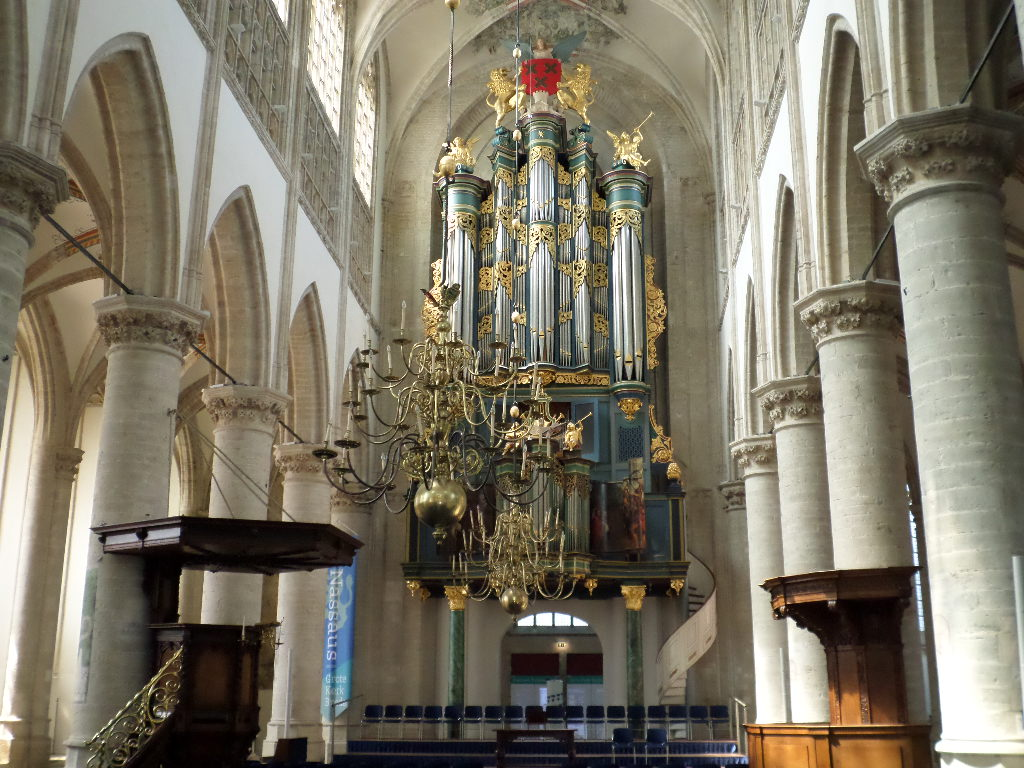

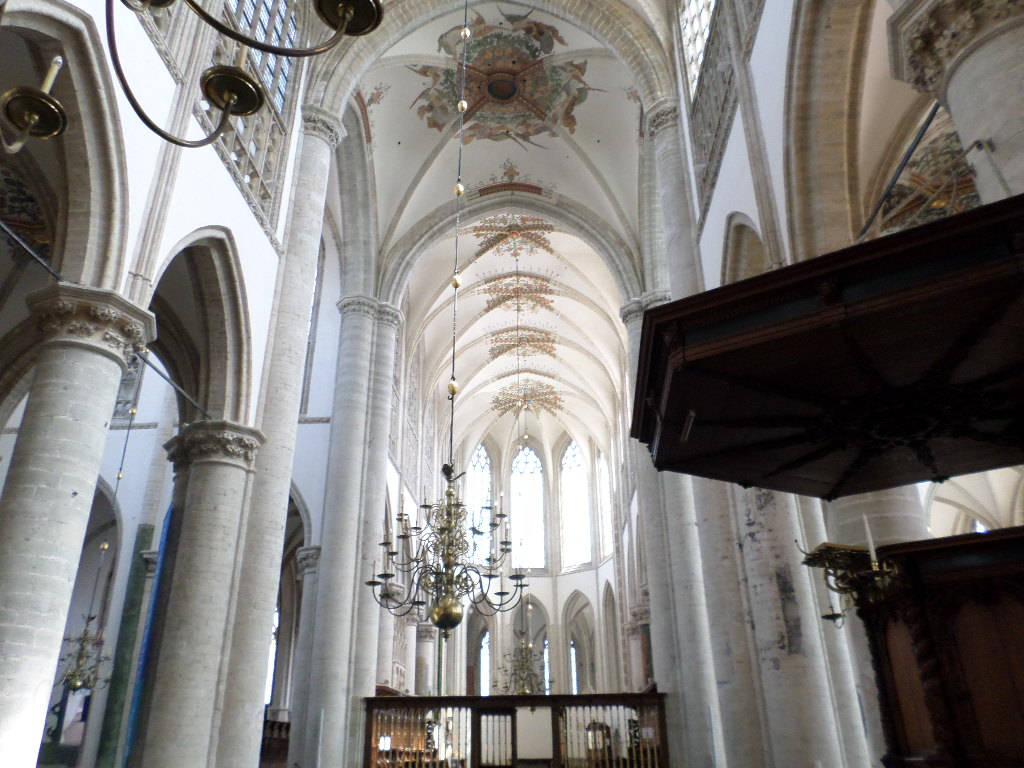

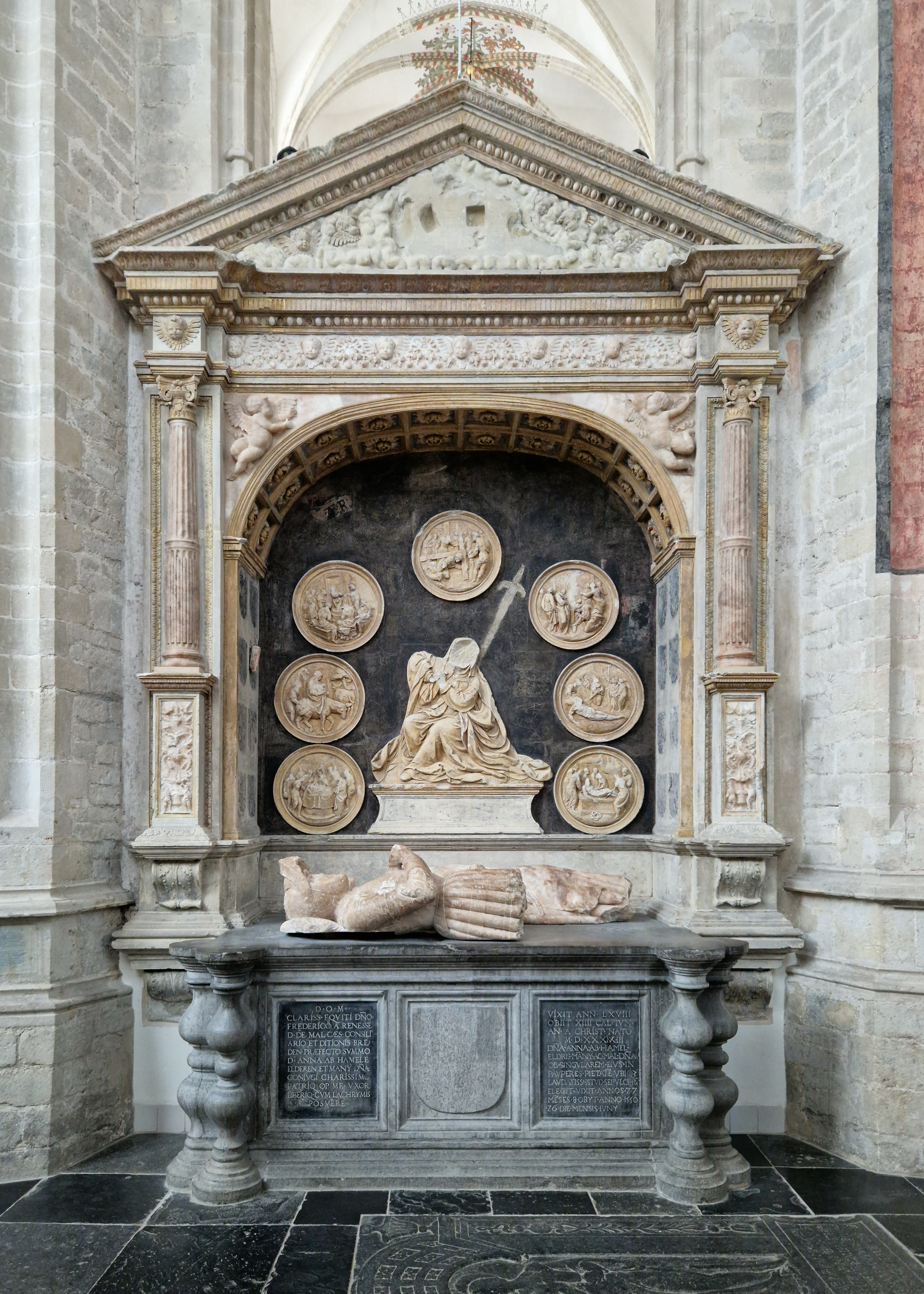

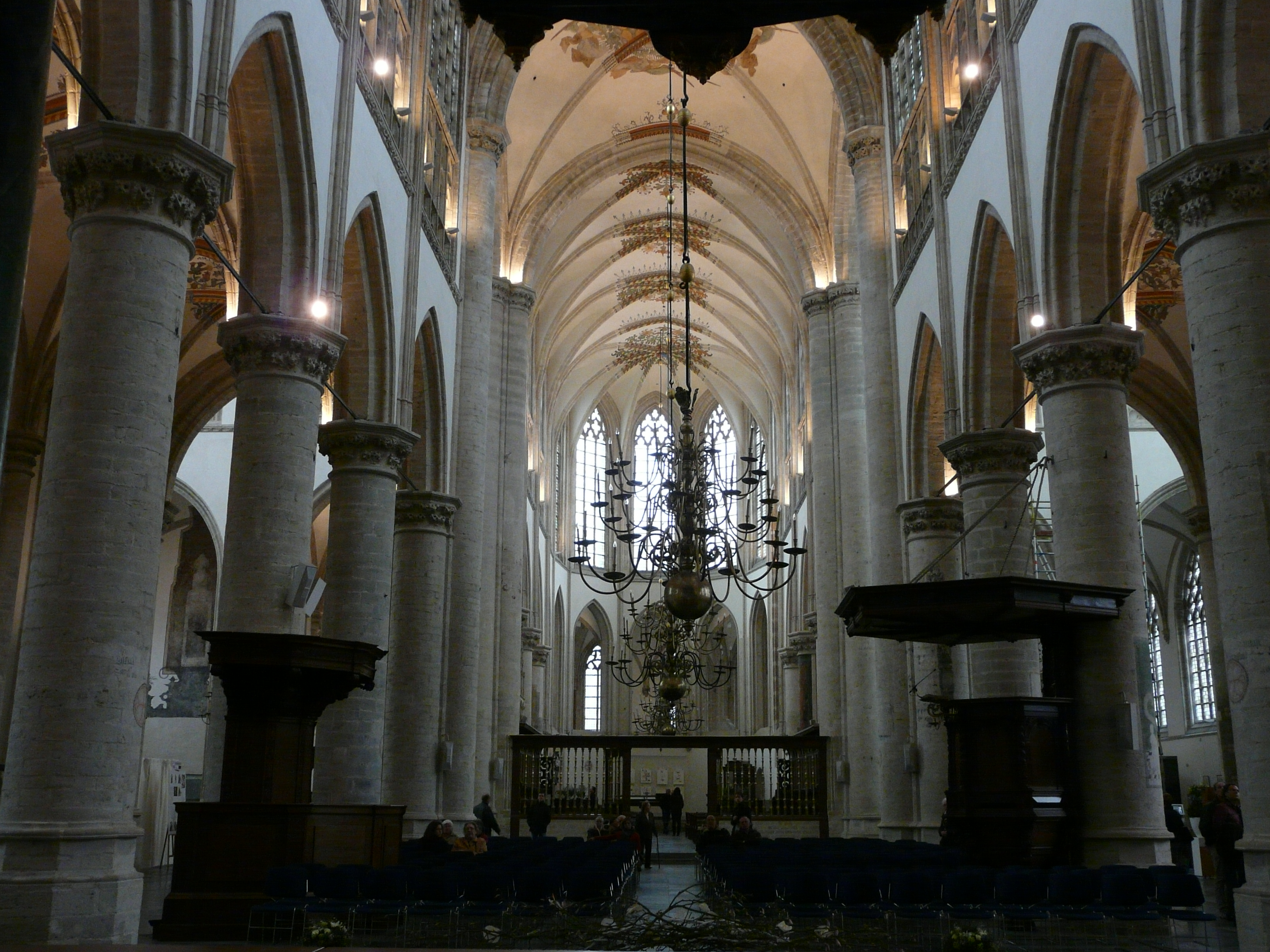

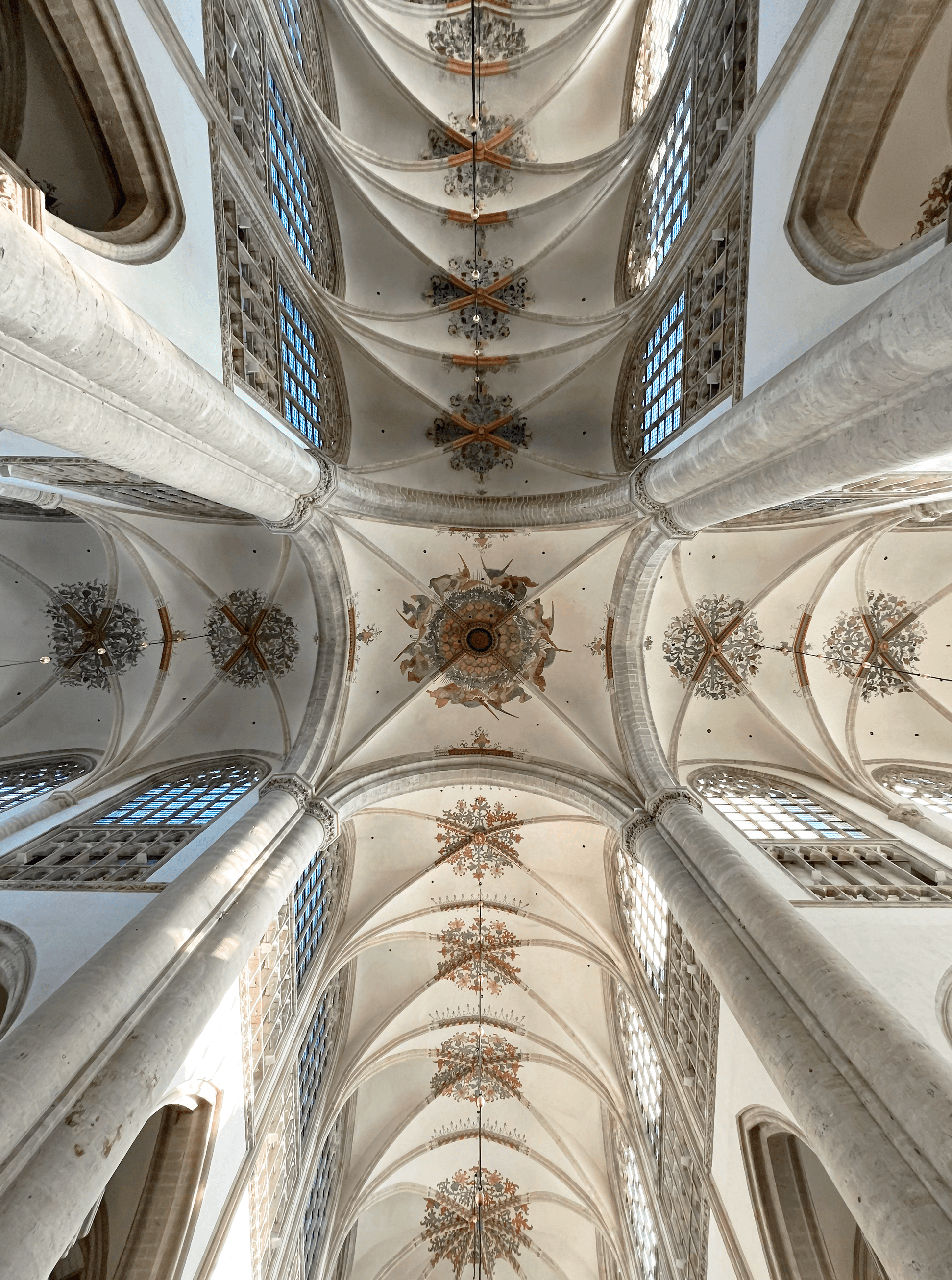

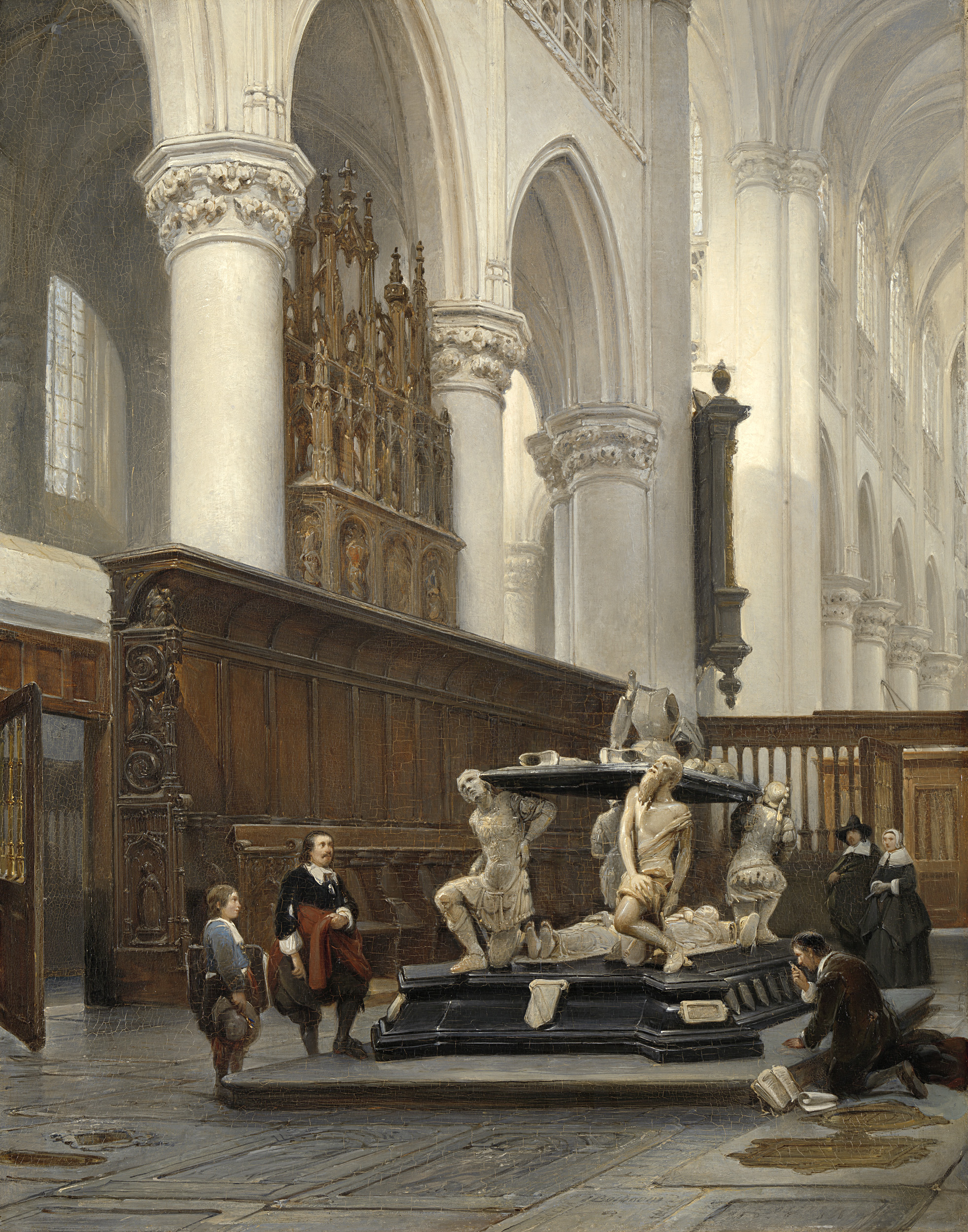

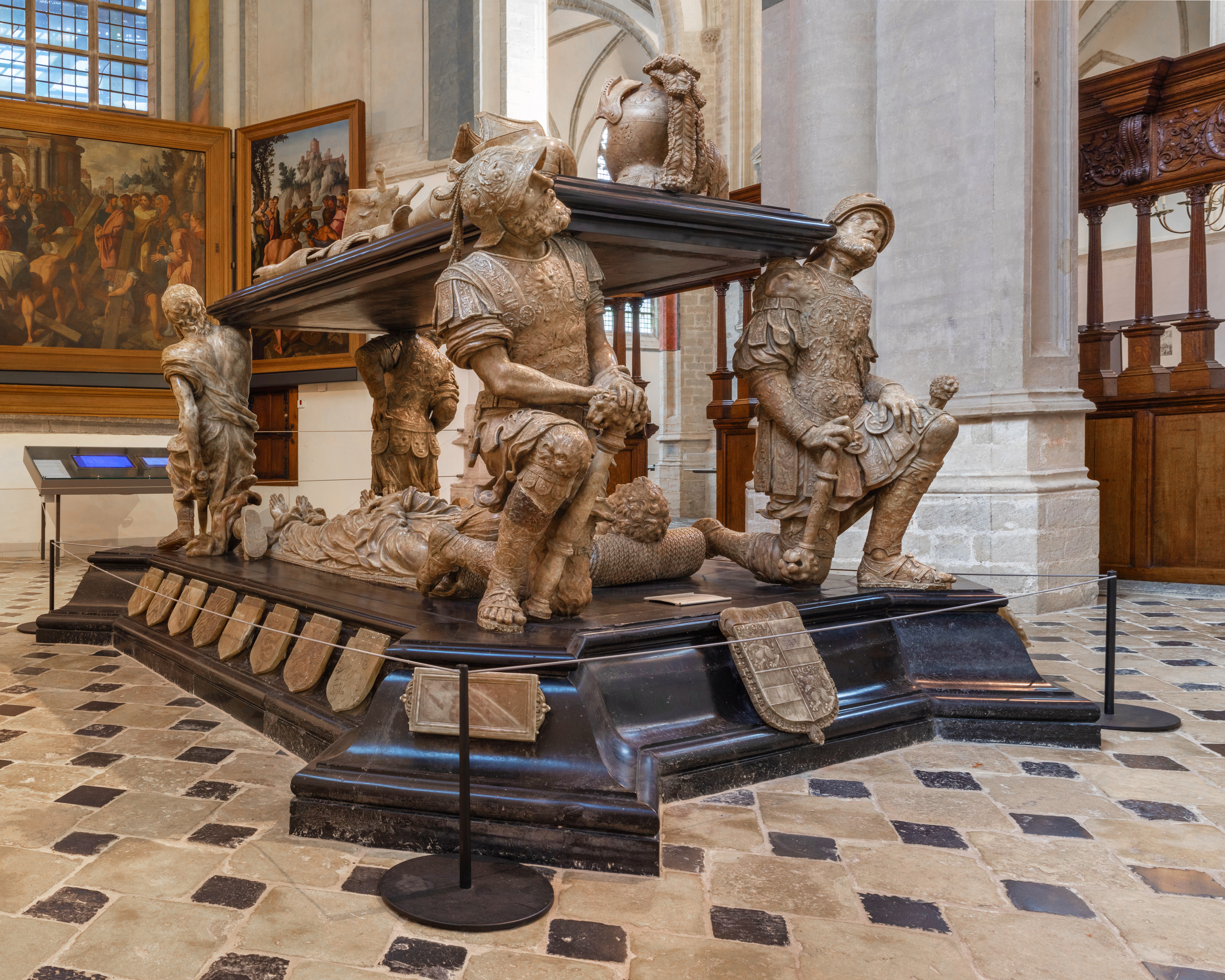

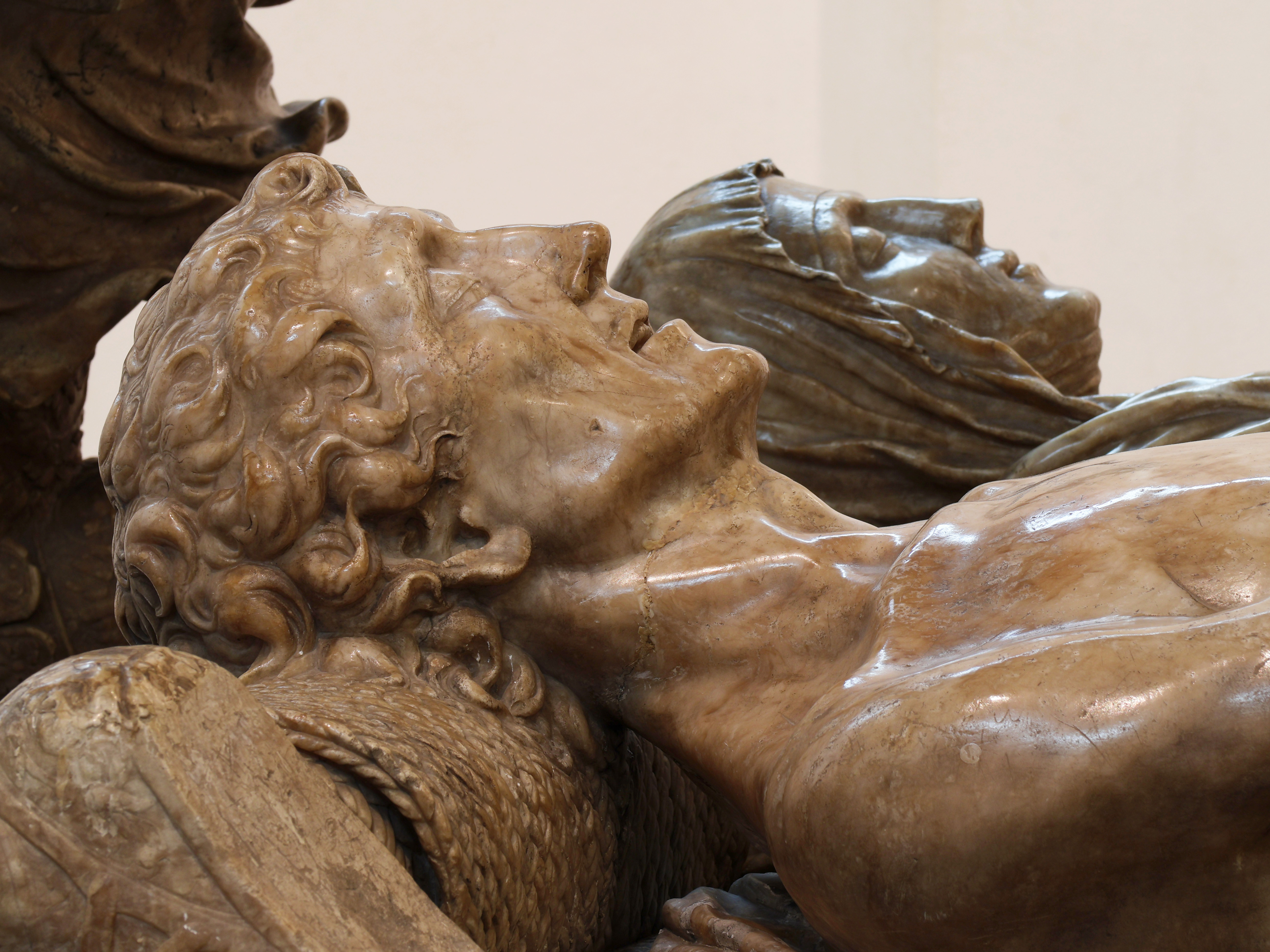

== See also ==
- List of tallest structures built before the 20th century
