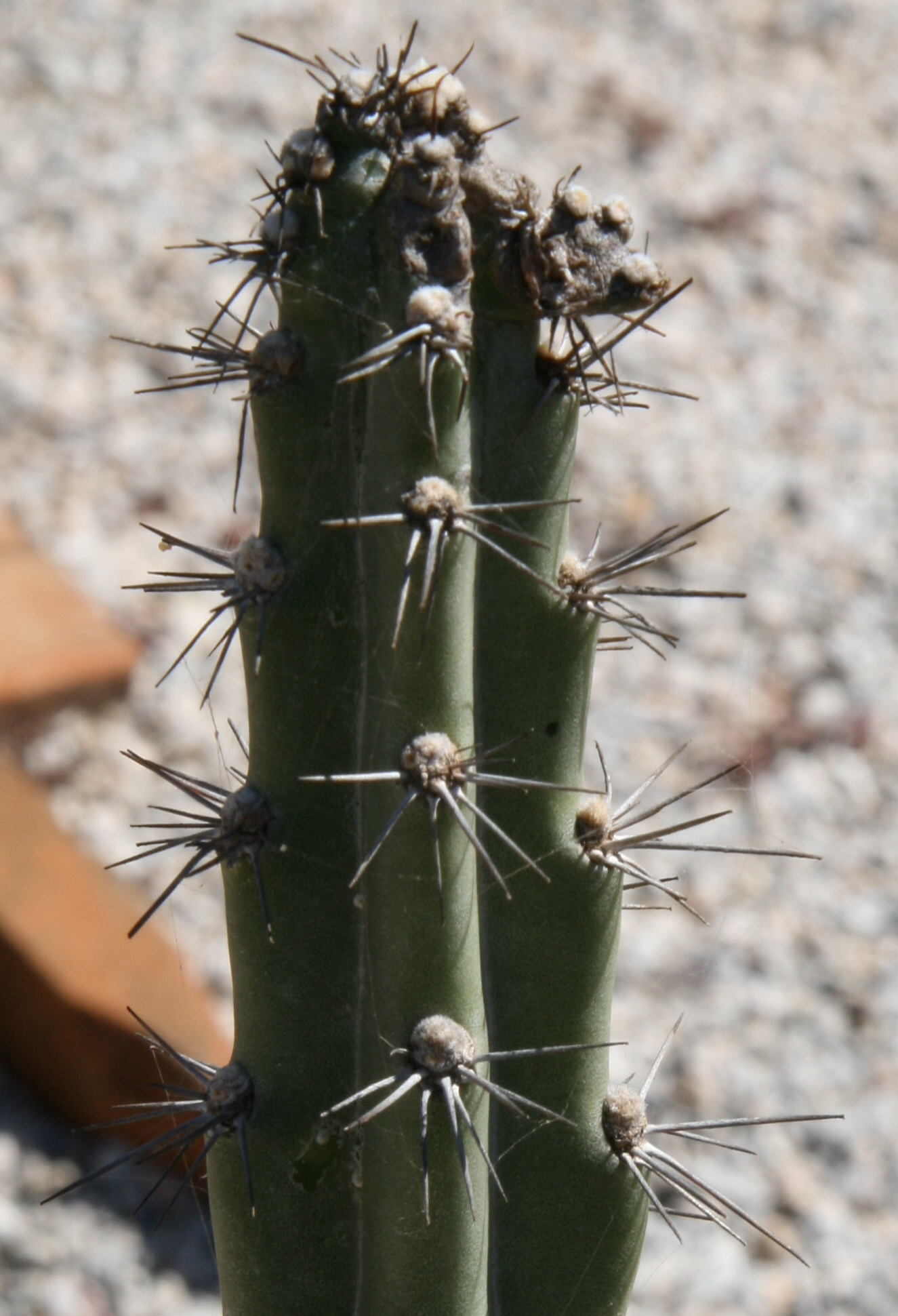

Conservation status
- Critically endangered, possibly extinct in the wild (IUCN 3.1)

Scientific classification
- Kingdom: Plantae
- Clade: Tracheophytes
- Clade: Angiosperms
- Clade: Eudicots
- Order: Caryophyllales
- Family: Cactaceae
- Subfamily: Cactoideae
- Genus: Cereus
- Species: C. albicaulis
- Subspecies: C. a. subsp. estevesii

Trinomial name
- Cereus albicaulis subsp. estevesii (P.J.Braun) N.P.Taylor

Synonyms
- Mirabella estevesii; Monvillea estevesii; Cereus estevesii

= Cereus albicaulis subsp. estevesii =

Species of cactus

Cereus ablicaulis subsp. estevesii, is a species of columnar cactus found in Minas Gerais, Brazil. The first description was published in 2004 by Pierre Josef Braun as Cereus estevesii.

== Description ==
Cereus abicaulis subsp. estevesii grows shrubby to tree-like, branches 1 to 1.2 meters above the base and reaches heights of growth of up to 2.8 meters. A woody trunk is formed. The initially more or less upright, later spread to hanging shoots are up to 5 meters long and have a diameter of 4.3 to 6.5 centimeters. Young shoots are glaucous, later turning greenish gray or green. There are five to six distinct, notched ribs up to 1.3 centimeters high. The felted areoles on it are 2 to 5.3 centimeters apart. The central spine, which can also be missing, reaches a length of up to 2.6 centimeters. The nine to twelve radial spines projecting unequally are initially maroon with a yellowish tip, become dark brownish gray with age and are 3 to 12 millimeters (rarely up to 20 millimeters) long.

The slender, funnel-shaped to pedicel-shaped, white flowers are 16.5 to 17.5 centimeters long and have a diameter of up to 12.5 centimeters. Her bare flower tube is green. Nothing is known about the fruits and seeds. It was formerly believed that Cereus estevesii is closely related to Cereus saddianus.

== Distribution ==
Cereus albicaulis subsp. estevesii is found in the north of the Brazilian state of Minas Gerais on sandy soil at elevations of about 400 meters.
