= Maribel (disambiguation) =

Maribel is a given name.

Maribel may also refer to:

- Maribel, Wisconsin, a place in the United States
- Maribel (TV series), a 1989 Venezuelan telenovela
