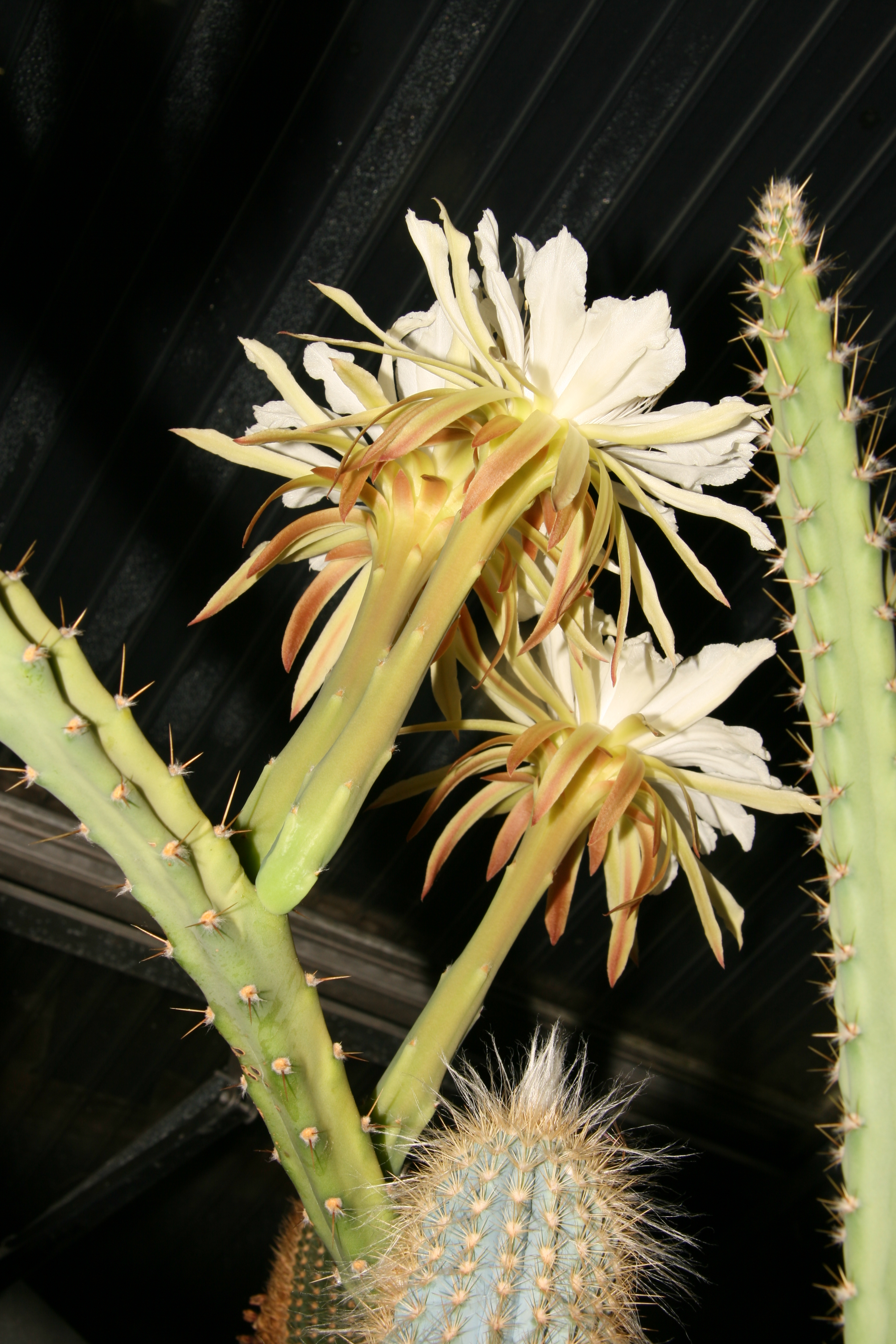

Conservation status
- Endangered (IUCN 3.1)

Scientific classification
- Kingdom: Plantae
- Clade: Tracheophytes
- Clade: Angiosperms
- Clade: Eudicots
- Order: Caryophyllales
- Family: Cactaceae
- Subfamily: Cactoideae
- Genus: Cereus
- Species: C. mirabella

Binomial name
- Cereus mirabella N.P.Taylor

Synonyms
- Mirabella minensis F.Ritter; Monvillea minensis (F.Ritter) R.Kiesling

= Cereus mirabella =

Species of cactus

Cereus mirabella, synonym Mirabella minensis, is a species of plant in the family Cactaceae. It is endemic to Brazil. Its natural habitat is dry savanna. It is threatened by habitat loss.

== Description ==
Cereus mirabella grows as a shrub with sprawling and numerously branched, blue-green shoots that later turn grey-green. The shoots have a diameter of 2 to 3 centimeters. There are 3 to 5 wavy and sometimes barely defined ribs. The circular areoles are covered with short to long, white or brown wool. The 3 to 6 needle-like and spreading yellow thorns are reddish brown at their base. They are up to 2.5 centimeters long.

The white flowers are 10 to 15 centimeters long. The egg-shaped, greenish fruits are up to 3.5 centimeters long.

== Distribution ==
Cereus mirabella is found in the Brazilian state of Minas Gerais in the Caatinga scrub on sandy soil.

== Taxonomy ==
The first description as Mirabella minensis was in 1979 by Friedrich Ritter. After the transfer to the genus Cereus, it was not possible to keep the species name because it was already in use (today Cipocereus minensis). Therefore, a replacement name was necessary, which was assigned in 1991 by Nigel Paul Taylor.
