= Mirabelle (Breda restaurant) =

Coordinates: 51°33′58.63″N 4°44′40.24″E

- Interactive map of Mirabelle

Restaurant information
- Established: abt. 1930
- Closed: 2012
- Food type: French
- Location: Dr. Batenburglaan 76, Breda, 4837 BR, Netherlands
- Seating capacity: 40

Mirabelle is a defunct restaurant located in the Mirabella Estate in Breda, in the Netherlands. It was a fine dining restaurant that was awarded one Michelin star in 1959 and retained that rating until 1967.

In recent years the restaurant came into hot water. Mostly depending on business guest, it went bankrupt in April 2009. The restaurant was bought by Trudi Splinter and reopened in January 2010. Instead of reaching the culinary top, as was their aim, the restaurant closed down in June 2012, due to bankruptcy of owner "Santé Group".

== See also ==
- List of Michelin starred restaurants in the Netherlands
